= Arts of Kerala =

Cultural aspect of Kerala

Position of Kerala in India

Beginning of Kolkali by the Hindus of Malabar. This art form includes styles like 'Vandhanakali,' 'Vattakol,' 'Thettikol,' 'Thaduthukali,' and 'Irunnukali.' Due to political reasons, it is not included in the Kerala School Kalolsavam.

The Indian state Kerala is well known for its diverse forms of performing arts. The various communities in Kerala contribute to its rich and colourful culture. The most important traditional art forms of Kerala are Kathakali, Kalaripayattu, Mayilpeeli Thookkam, Koodiyattam, Theyyam, Mohiniyattam, Thullal, Padayani, Pulikali, Thiruvathirakali, Chakyarkoothu, Chavittunadakam, etc.

== Performing arts of Kerala ==
=== Kerala Hindu Arts ===
Kakkarissi Nadakam - A folk art form popular in Southern Kerala

- Ayyappan Vilakku
- Shastham Paatu
- Kathakali
- Chakyar Koothu
- Nangiar Koothu
- Mohiniyattam
- Thirayattam
- Padayani
- Mayilpeeli Thookkam
- Thiyyattu
- Koodiyattam
- Kerala Natanam
- Panchavadyam
- Thullal
- Tholpavakoothu
- Ottamthullal
- Garudan Thookkam
- Kolam Thullal
- Kakkarissi Nadakam
- Poorakkali
- Mudiyett
- Kummattikali
- Kuthiyottam
- Thiriyuzhichil
- Kalaripayattu
- Mangalamkali
- Marathukali
- Malayikuthu
- Mukkanchathan
- Charadupinnikkali
- Kothammuriyattam
- Sopanam
- Thacholikali
- Sarpam Thullal
- Pulluvan Paattu
- Poothan and Thira
- Yakshagana in Kasaragod
- Kanyarkali in northern Palakkad district
- Purattu Nadakam in Palakkad district
- Pavakoothu
- Kaalakali
- Thiruvathira
- Krishnanattam
- Koodiyattam
- Vadyakala
- Villadicham pattu
- Thottam pattu
- Kuthiyottam
- Theyyam
- Onapottan
- Pettathullal
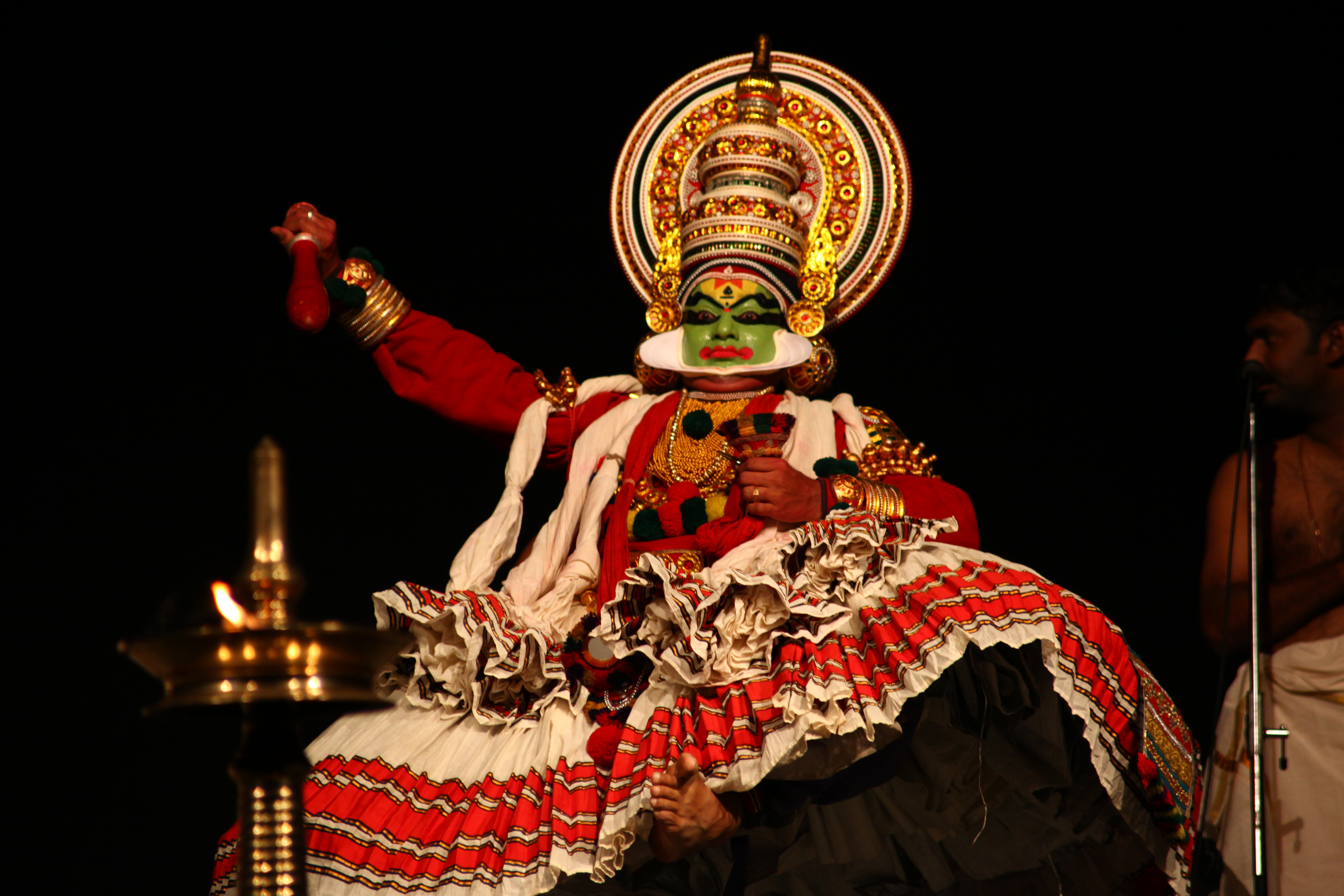
Kathakali

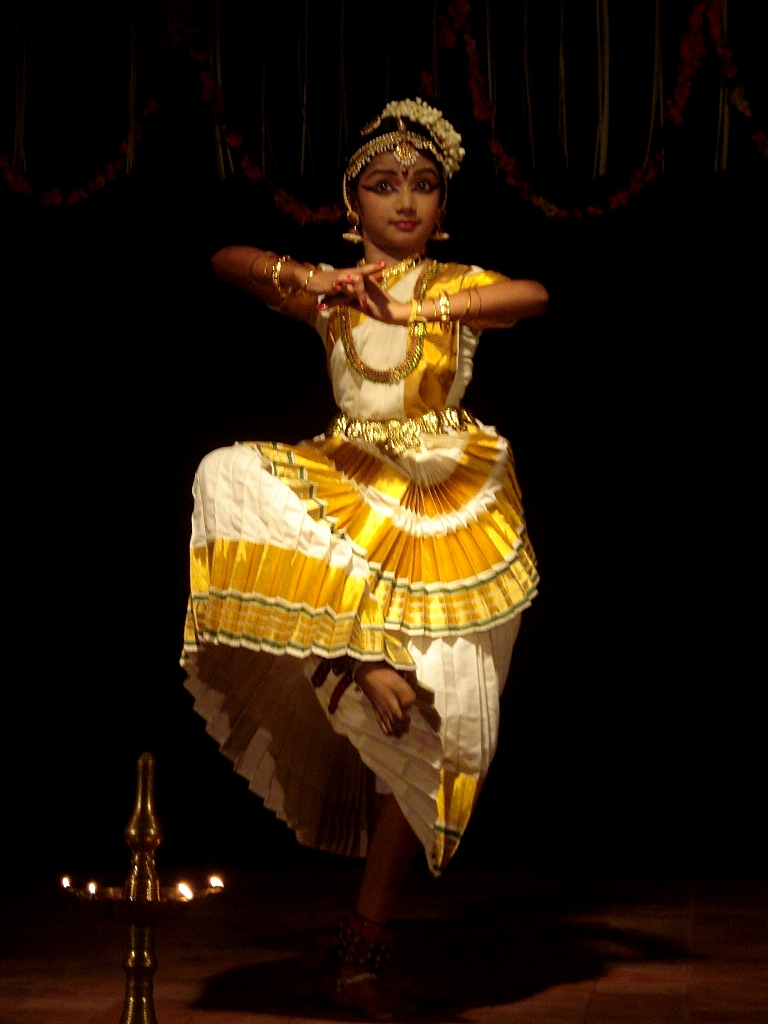
Mohiniyattam

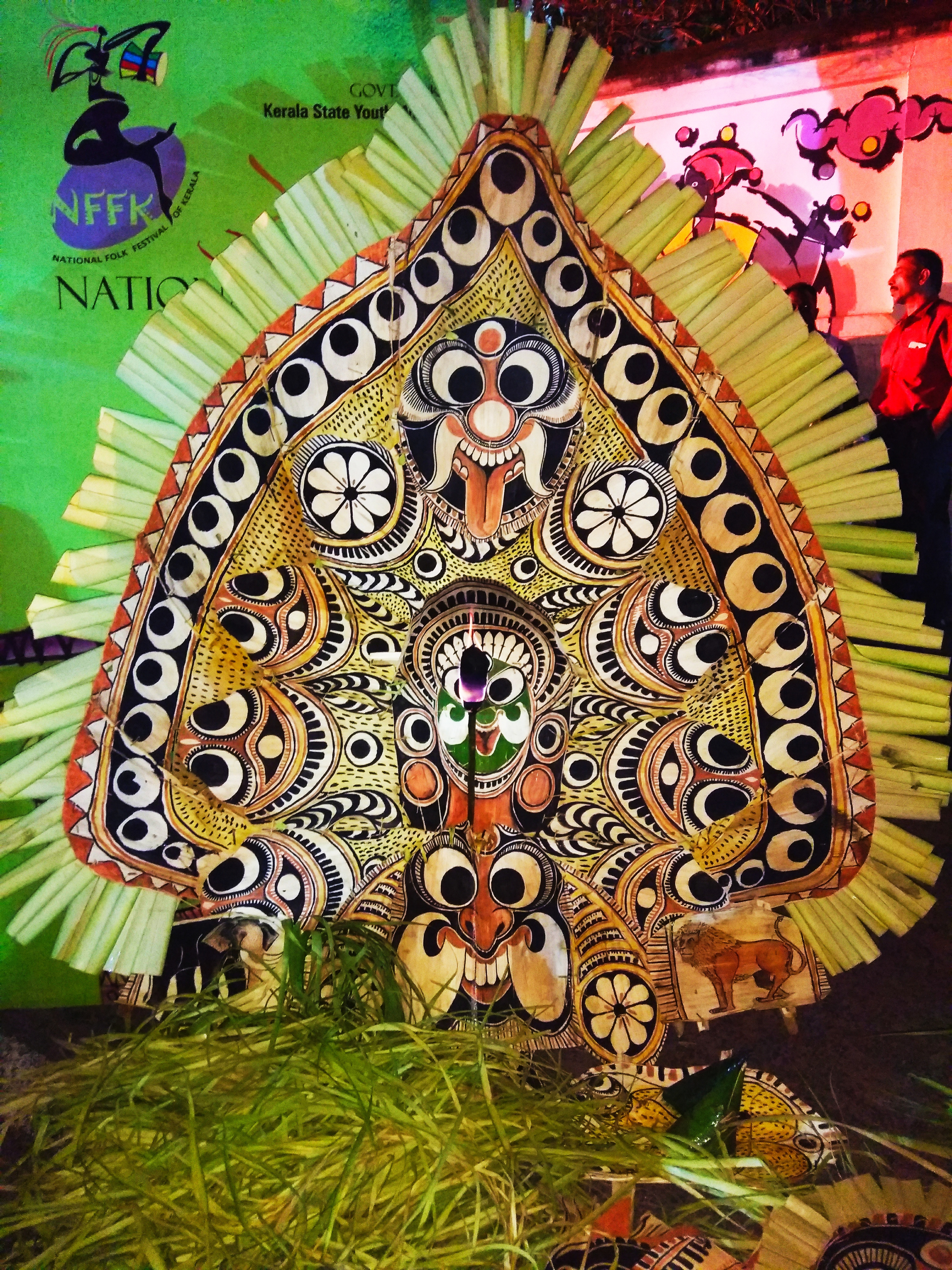
Padayani

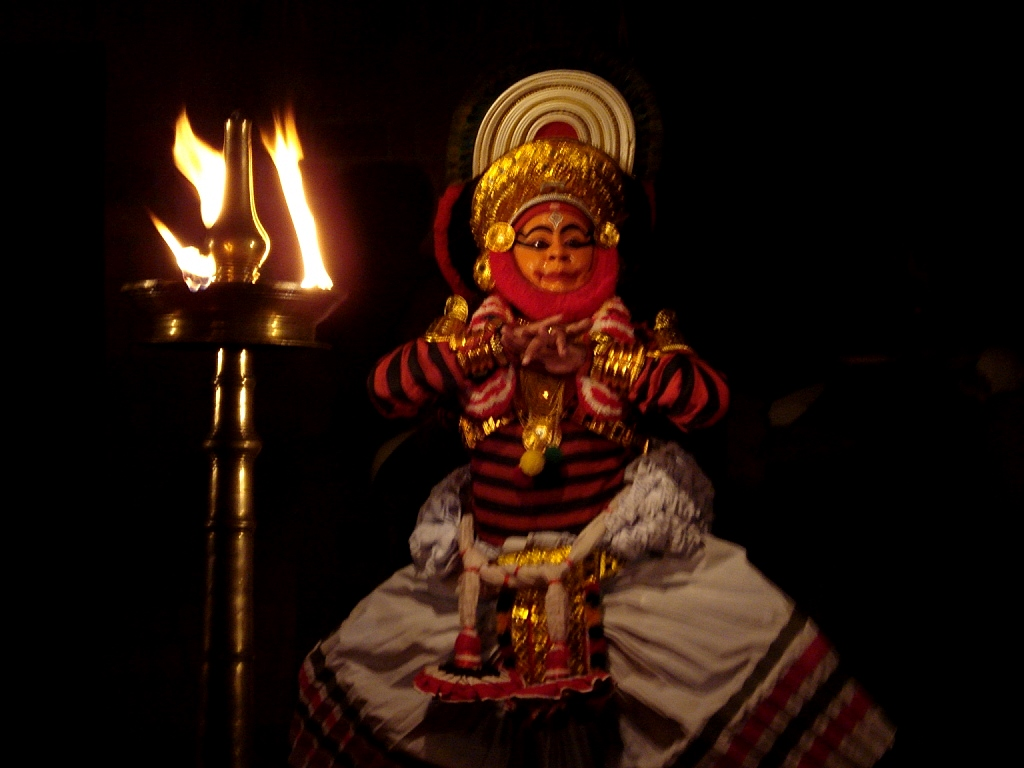
Koodiyattam

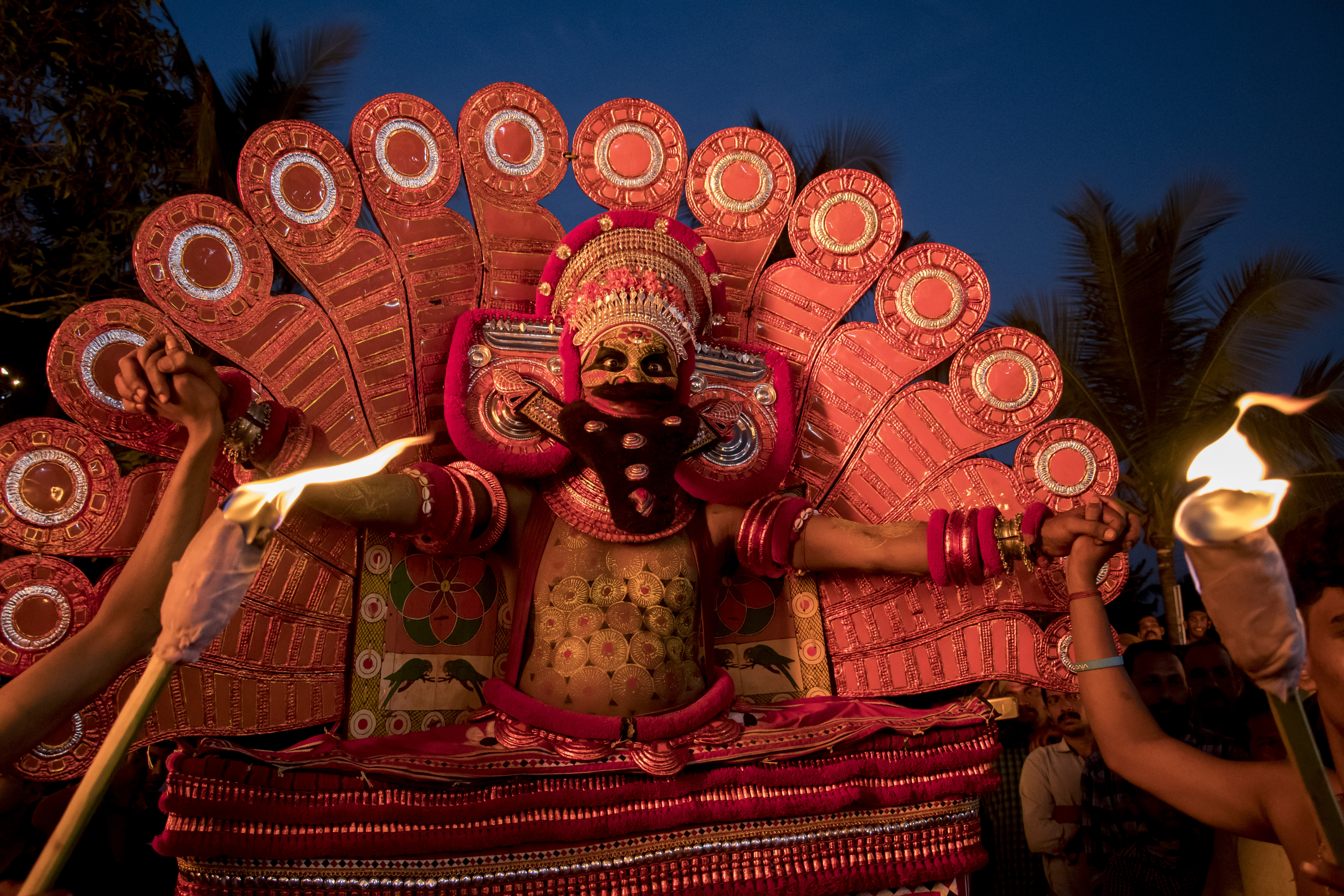
Theyyam

=== Kerala Muslim arts ===
- Oppana
- Mappila Paattu
- Kolkali
- Duff Muttu
- Arabana muttu
- Muttum Viliyum
- Vattappattu

=== Kerala Christian arts ===
Margamkali being performed during a Syro-Malabar Nasrani wedding.

- Margam Kali
- Chavittu Nadakam
- Parichamuttukali
- Slama Carol
- Othiyattam
- Ayanippattu
- Poovirukkam

=== Others ===
- Kadhaprasangam
- Nadodi Nrittham
- Puli Kali

== Fine arts of Kerala ==
- Murals of Kerala

== Arts promotion bodies ==
- Kerala Kalamandalam
- Kerala Lalitakala Academy
- Kerala Sangeetha Nadaka Academy, Thrissur
- Kerala Folklore Academy
- Guru Gopinath Nadana Gramam

== See also ==
- Culture of Kerala
- Music of Kerala
- Triumvirate poets of modern Malayalam
