= Mudiyettu =

South Indian traditional ritual theatre and semi-classical/folk dance drama

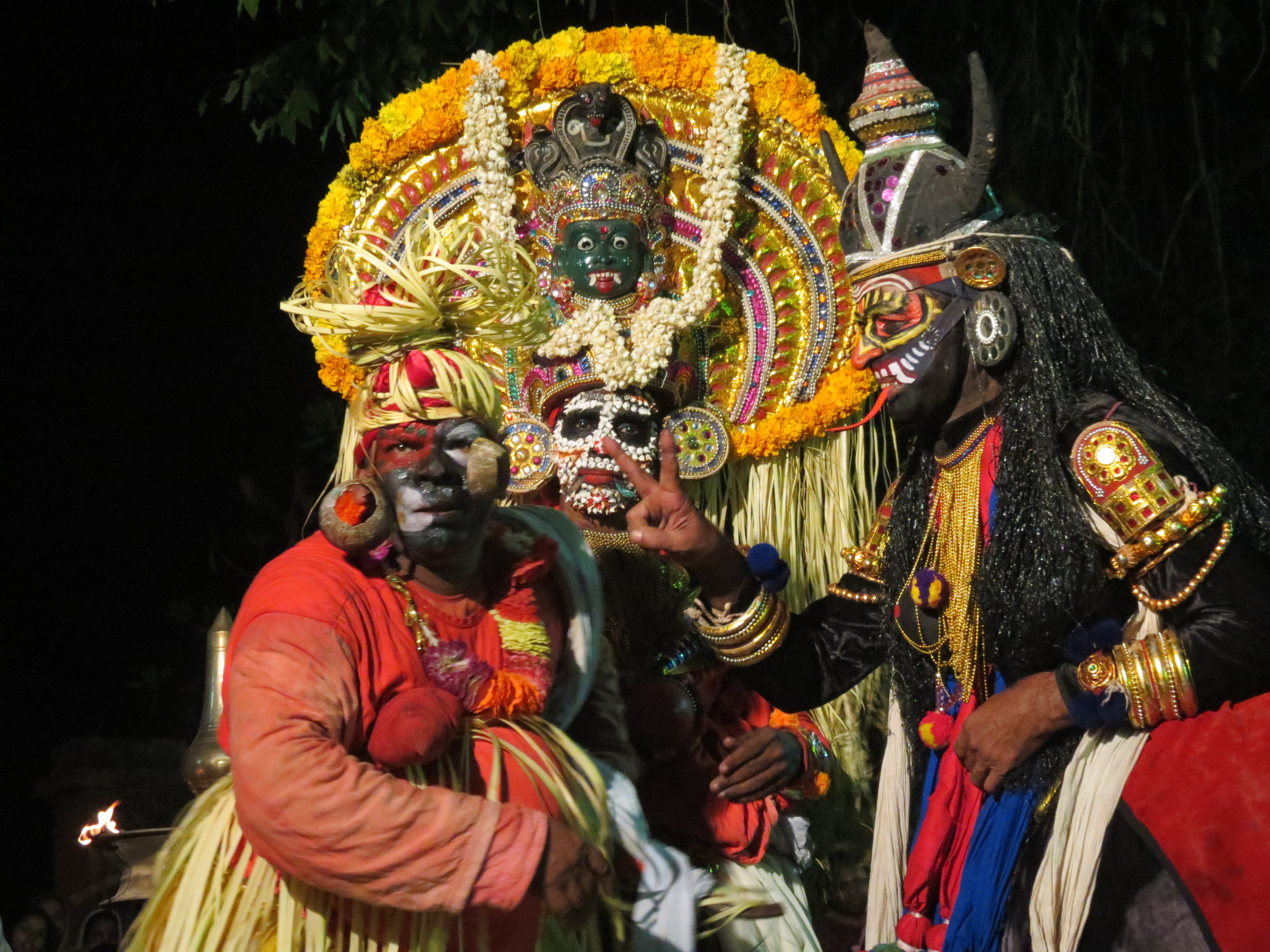
- Mudiyettu at Keezhoor shrine in 2013
- Medium: Ritual theatre and folk dance
- Originating culture: Kerala

Mudiyettu, ritual theatre and dance drama of Kerala
- UNESCO Intangible Cultural Heritage
- Country: India
- Reference: 00345
- Region: Asia and the Pacific

Inscription history
- Inscription: 2010 (5th session)
- List: Representative

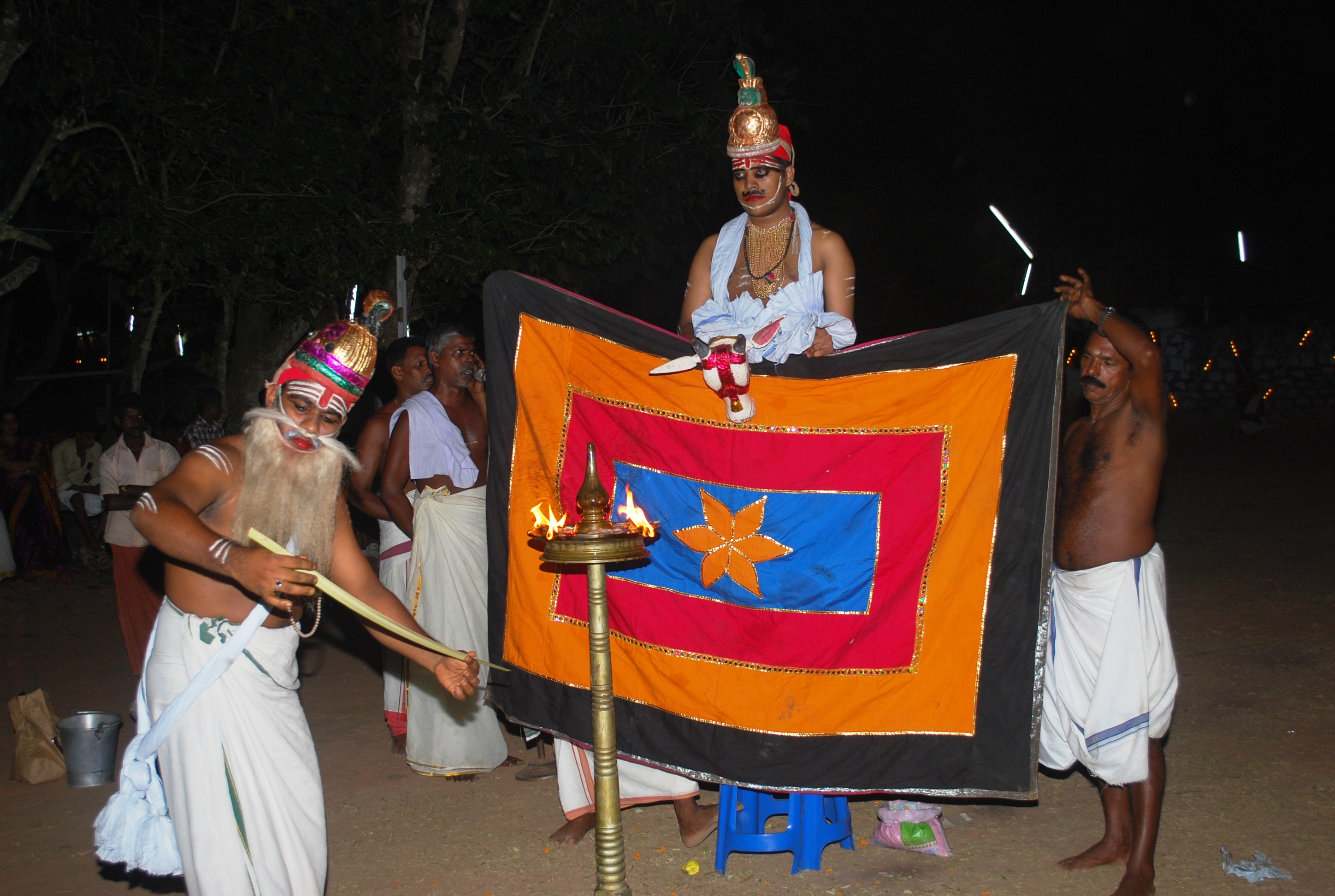
Mudiyettu

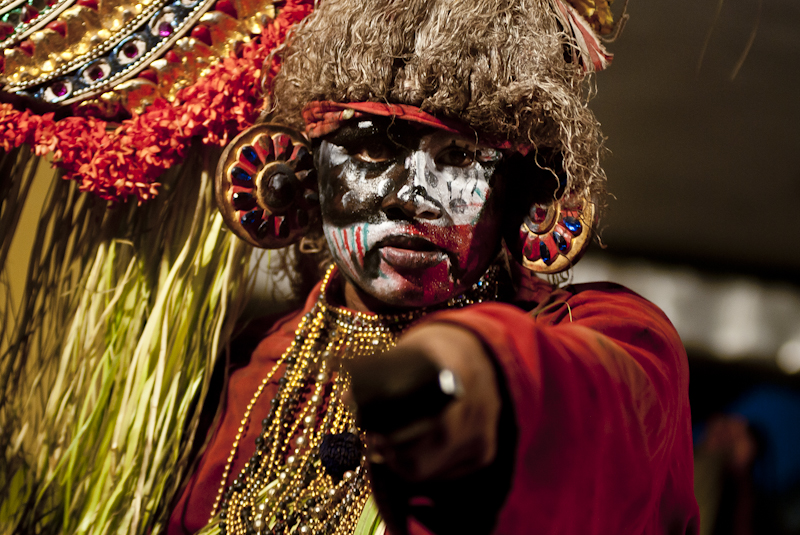
kooli - a character who helps Kali appear as a comedian

Mudiyettu is a traditional ritual theatre and folk dance drama from Kerala that enacts the mythological tale of a battle between the goddess Kali and the demon Darika. The ritual is a part of the Bhagavathi or Bhadrakali cult. The dance is performed in Bhadrakali temples, the temples of the Mother Goddess, between February and May after the harvesting season.

In 2010 Mudiyettu was inscribed in the UNESCO’s Representative List of the Intangible Cultural Heritage of Humanity, becoming the second art form from Kerala after Koodiyattam.

== Kali-Darika myth ==
Darika was a demon who received a boon from Brahma which granted that he would never be defeated by any man living in any of the fourteen worlds of Hindu mythology. This made Darika immensely powerful and arrogant. Armed with this boon, Darika went on to conquer the world defeating even Indra, the king of the gods. As his atrocities became intolerable, the sage Narada requested Shiva to contain Darika. Shiva agreed, circumventing Brahma's boon by declaring that Darika would be killed by the goddess Kali, she being a woman and one not to be counted among men from fourteen worlds.

== Features of Mudiyettu ==
Mudiyettu is a village ritual performed by members of the Marar and Kuruppu communities in Thrissur, Ernakulam, Kottayam and Idukki districts of Kerala. However, the entire community contributes to and participates in it. Mudiyettu is performed annually in ‘Bhagavati Kavus’, the temples of the goddess, in different villages along the rivers Chalakkudy Puzha, Periyar and Moovattupuzha.

There is no rehearsal or preparation involved in playing Kali. The performance is a natural progression from Shiva, Narada, demons Danavan and Darikan to Kali. A complete Mudiyettu performance requires a total of 16 persons— including percussionists, Kalamezhuthu artists, vocalists. There are also evident regional differences in the attire and performance styles of Mudiyettu. Thus, in the Koratty style, Kali exhibits a bare torso, covered only by a breast-shaped plank while in the Kunnayckal, Keezhillam and the Pazhoor styles, she wears a full upper body dress. Similarly, in the Koratty style, Darika's mudi resembles the Kathakali crown and his face paint the Kathi Veshas of Kathakali. This points to how the two forms have become interlinked even though Mudiyettu predates Kathakali, with epigraphists tracing its evolution as an art to even the 9th or 10th century AD.

== The role of the community ==
Mudiyettu is a communal undertaking in which each caste of the village plays a specific role. The bamboo artefacts and leather hides for drums are provided by the Parayan caste while the Thandan caste brings the areca nut fronds that are required for the masks and headgears. The Ganakan community paints the masks while the Kuruvan community keeps the country torches burning. It is the Veluthedan (Patiyan) caste that washes the clothes used for making the deity’'s dress while the Maran caste readies the torches and keeps them supplied with oil.

Thus each caste in the village contributes to the festival according to its traditional caste role. Mutual cooperation and collective participation of each caste in the ritual instills and strengthens common identity and mutual bonding in the community.

== Transmitting and conserving Mudiyettu ==
Being a community based art form it is the community that has traditionally encouraged and trained the next generation to preserve the art form. There is no school or institution to give training in this art form and its survival depends almost exclusively on direct transmission through the Guru-Shishya Parampara. In 2010 Mudiyettu was inscribed in the UNESCO’s Representative List of the Intangible Cultural Heritage of Humanity due to its role in "transmission of traditional values, ethics, moral codes and aesthetic norms of the community to the next generation."

== See also ==
- Arts of Kerala
- Kerala Folklore Academy
