= Mangalamkali =

Mangalam kali team

Mangalamkali is a dance ritual related to marriage functions as a form of entertainment. Usually mavilas (a tribe in kasaragod and kannur districts Kerala (state of south India) perform this. Certain music instruments too are used like thudi. The dance movement gradually become fast.

== See also ==
- Arts of Kerala
- Kerala Folklore Academy
