= Kummattikali =

Type of dance

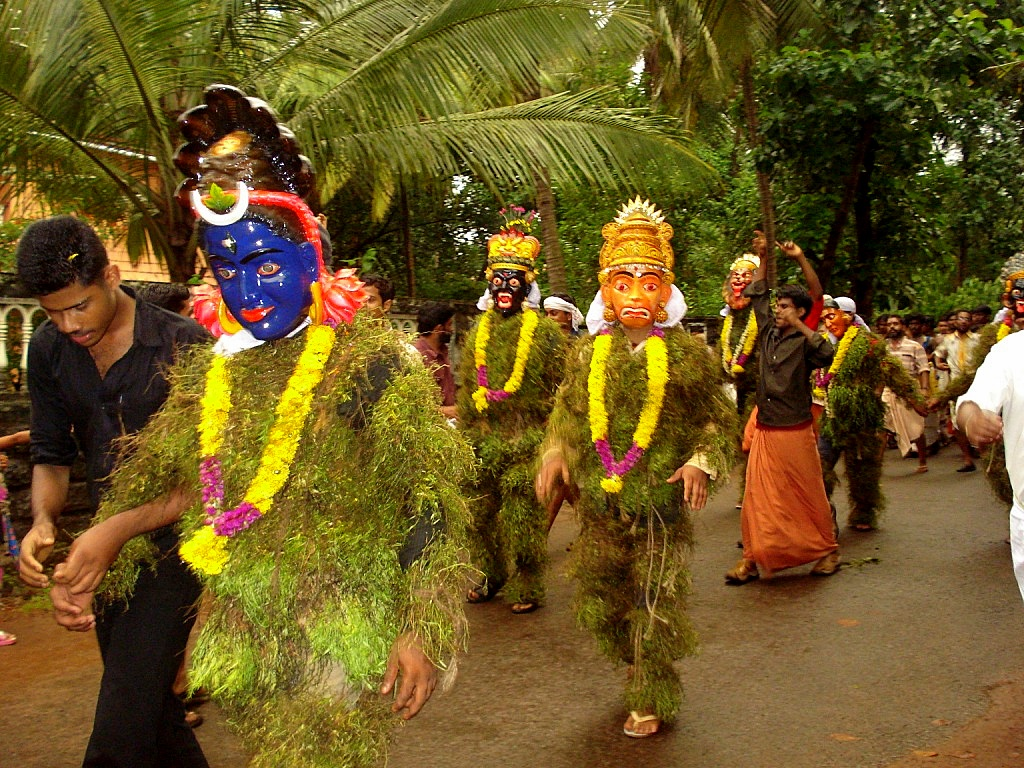
Kummattikalli performers moving house to house in Thrissur.

Kummattikali or Kummatti Kali is the famous colorful mask-dance of Kerala, prevalent in Thrissur District, Palakkad District and parts of South Malabar. During the festival of Onam, Kummattikali performers move from house to house collecting small gifts and entertaining people. Kummatti dances are rampant in the Thrissur district during Onam. Pristine or original form of Kummattikali can be seen in the Bhadrakali temple in Palakkad district.

== Costumes ==
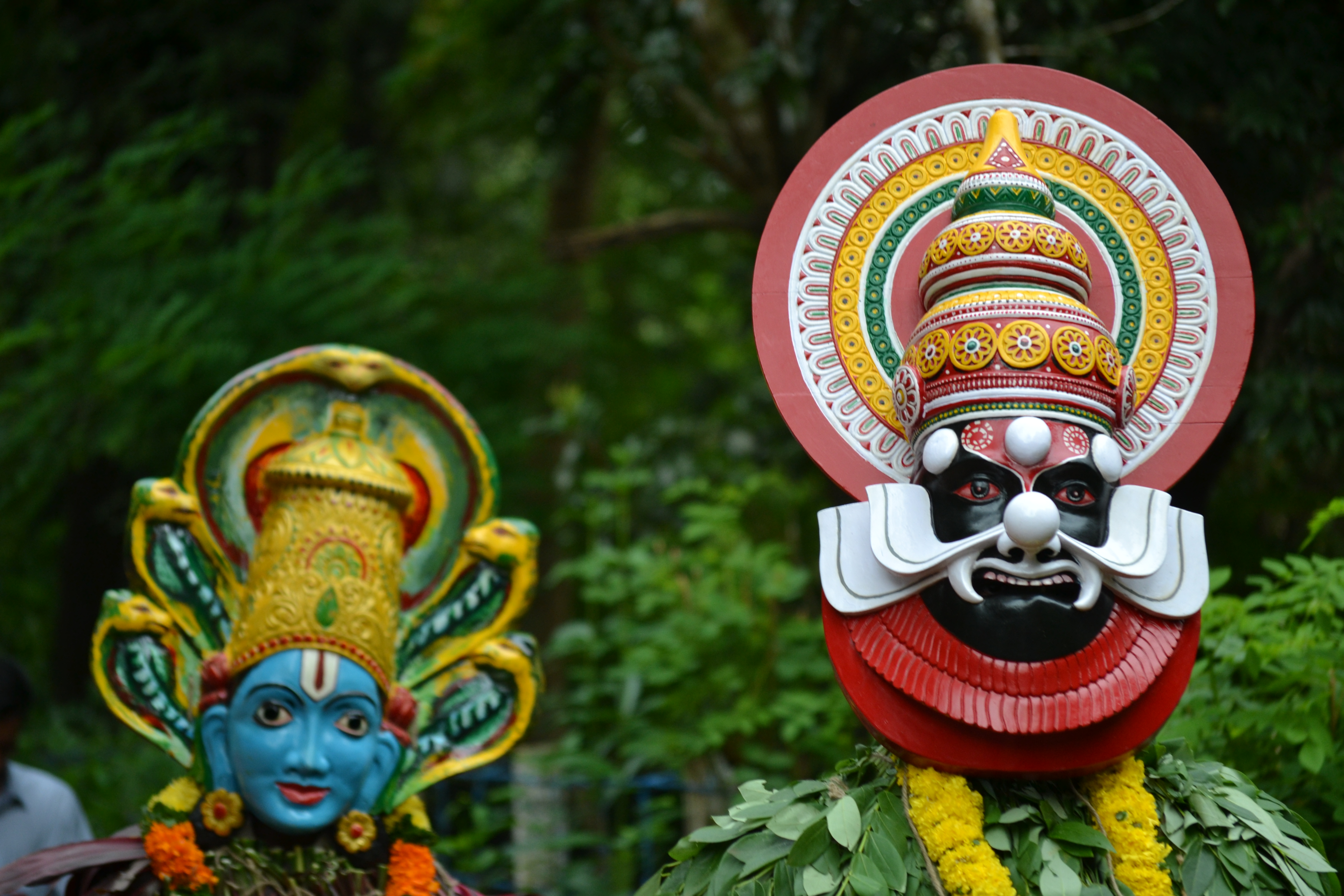
Kummatty masks used in the performance

The costumes are a most interesting fact of Kummattikali. The dancers don a heavily painted colourful wooden mask depicting faces of Krishna, Narada, Kiratha, Darika, or hunters. These masks are usually made out of saprophyte, jack fruit tree, Alstonia scholaris, Hog Plum tree or the Coral tree.

The dancers wear skirts woven out of plaited grass. Some cover their whole body with bunches of grass for a bushier appearance. The semblance is made more joyful with the 'talla' attached externally to the mask giving the appearance of a toothless open mouth. Dancers also hold and manipulate long sticks of residuary agricultural produce called 'Kummattikali': it is from this that the dance derives its name. Their dance is related to Shaiva myth. 'Thamma' (an old woman) walks in front with the help of a stick. Thamma is symbolic of mother of every being and everything.

Kummatti dancers are a sight to watch as they move around from house to house collecting jaggery, rice, or small amounts of cash. Onlookers, especially children, take great delight in their performance.

== Performance ==
The rhythm for the dance movements is provided by vibrating the string of a bow like instrument called an Onavillu. Areca nut wood is used to make the bow and the strings are beaten with a narrow bamboo stick.

The themes of Kummattikali are mostly taken from the stories of Ramayana, Darika Vadham, the story of Shiva and folk tales like Manjan Nayare Pattu.

Kummattikali - കുമ്മാട്ടിക്കളി - Wiki Loves Onam 2024

It may be noted that folk art of Kerala can be classified into two broad categories - ritualistic and non-ritualistic. Ritualistic can be further divided into - Devotional, performed to please a particular god and goddess and Magical Art Forms. Theyyam, Thirra, Poothamthira, Kannyar Kali, Kummattikali, etc. are some of devotional art forms.

== In popular culture ==
In the 2020 Malayalam action film Ayyappanum Koshiyum, the character Ayyappan's past as a vigilante assassin disguised as a Kummatti performer is a central plot point. Ayyappan's mastery of Kalari martial arts skills enabled him to kill 13 assassins in Kummatti disguise sent by evil landlords to eliminate worker's union members.
