= M. V. Vishnu Namboothiri =

Indian folklore researcher (1939–2019)

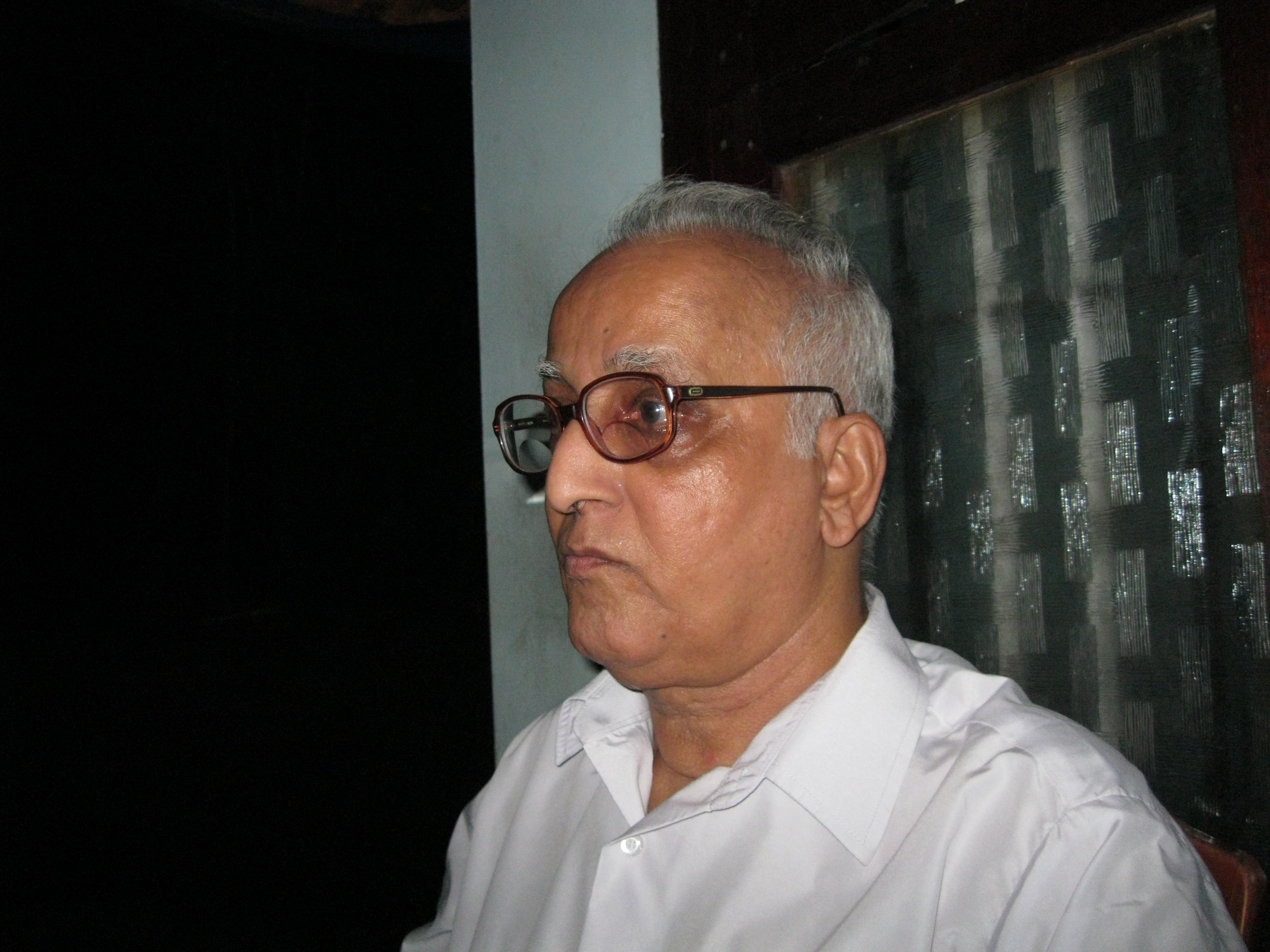
- Born: 25 October 1939; Ramanthali, Malabar District, Madras presidency, British India
- Died: 9 March 2019 (aged 79); Payyannur, Kannur District, Kerala
- Occupations: Folklore researcher, writer, teacher
- Spouse: Suvarnini Antarjanam
- Children: 3
- Parent(s): Subramanian Namboothiri; Draupadi Antarjanam
- Awards: Kerala Folklore Academy Award; Kerala Sangeetha Nataka Akademi Award; Kerala Sahitya Akademi Award

Mithale Vattaparam Vishnu Namboothiri was a teacher, folk art researcher and author from Kerala, India. He was considered an authoritative source of information on Theyyam and other traditional art forms of North Malabar. He received several awards including awards from Kerala Sahitya Akademi, Kerala Folklore Academy and Kerala Sangeetha Nataka Academy.

== Biography ==
Vishnu Namboothiri was born on 25 October 1939 to Mithale Vattaparam Illath Subramanian Namboothiri and Draupadi Antarjanam in Kunnaru, Ramantali in present-day Kannur District of Kerala. After completing his graduation in Malayalam, he started his professional career as a primary teacher in Malayalam and also became a teacher at high school and higher secondary levels. He has served as a Malayalam teacher at Kannur University's Kanhangad P Memorial Campus and as Head of the Malayalam Department at Kaladi Sreesankaracharya Sanskrit University's Payyannur Center. He also served as a Sarvavijnanakosam advisory committee member and research guide at Kozhikode, Kaladi, Kannur and MG universities. He retired from Ramantali Govt High School. He was also the former chairman of Kerala Folklore Academy.

=== Personal life and death ===
Vishnu Namboothiri and his wife Suvarnini have three children, Subramanian, Lalithambika and Muralidharan. He died on 9 March 2019, at Payyannur, Kerala. In the obituary of his death, the then Kerala Chief Minister Pinarayi Vijayan said that Vishnu Namboothiri was one of the pioneers of folklore study and research in Kerala.

== Career as Folkorist ==
Vishnu Namboothiri has done many years of research on kavus and theyyams and other religious and folk art forms of Kerala. He has authored 69 books in the genre folklore, including Keralathile Nadodi vijnanathinu oru mukhavura (meaning An Introduction to the Folklore of Kerala), Folklore chinthakal, Puravritha padanam (study on myths of Kerala), Namboothiri bhasha shabdakosham (a dictionary on language of Namboothiris), Mukhadarshan, Pulluvanpattum Nagaradhanayum (book on Pulluvan Paattu and snake worship in Kerala), Mandravadavum Mantravadappattum (book on traditional black magic and black magic songs in Kerala), Vannanum konthronpattum (book on folk music of Kerala), Pulayarude pattukal (book on folk songs of Pulayar community in Kerala), Kothamuri, Thottam pattukal oru padanam (a study on Thottam Pattu), Theyyavum thirayum, Theyyam, Nadodivijnjaneeyam, Poorakkali (a study on Poorakkali), Gaveshana Praveshika (meaning research entry), Keralathile Nadan sangeetham (a book on folk music of Kerala), Thottam, Nadanpattu Manjari, Pottanattam, Vivaranathmaka folklore granthasoochi (descriptive folklore bibliography) etc.

== Awards and honors ==
- Kerala Sahitya Akademi Award (IC Chacko Endowment) 1998 for his Dictionary of Folklore
- Kerala Sangeetha Nataka Akademi Award 2008 (Folk Art Research)
- P K Kalan Award of (2009) instituted by the Kerala government
- First award of Kerala Folklore Academy for Comprehensive Contribution in folklore textbooks
- Pattathanam Award 1998 (in recognition of over a quarter of a century of services in the field of folklore studies)
- S. Guptan Nair Memorial Award 2011
- Kadtanath Udayavarmaraja Award 2012
- Kalamezhut Study Center Award
- Vijnanpeeth Award
- Kerala State Biodiversity Award
- Abu Dhabi Sakthi Award (2015)
- Senior Fellowship of Department of Culture, Government of India
