= Arayankavu =

- town
- Interactive map of Arayankavu
- Coordinates: 9.8309452°N 76.4269924°E
- Country: India
- State: Kerala
- District: Ernakulam

Area
  - Total: 44.59 km^{2} (17.22 sq mi)

Population (2001)
  - Total: 23,500
  - Density: 527/km^{2} (1,360/sq mi)

Languages
  - Official: Malayalam, English
- Time zone: UTC+5:30 (IST)
- PIN: 682317
- Telephone code: 91 484 274/273
- Vehicle registration: KL-39
- Nearest city: Tripunithura
- Literacy: 93.080%%
- Lok Sabha constituency: Kottayam

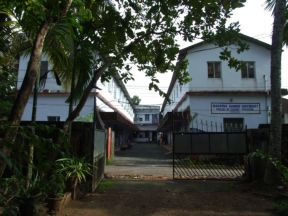
Teacher Education college

Arayankavu is a village in Kerala, south India with Piravam Road as the nearest railway station. It belongs to the Amballoor Village Panchayath. The Arayankavu Temple is a famous temple of the Hindu mother goddess Bhadrakali. The temple is located near Ernakulam in the southern Indian state of Kerala and is one of the most popular temples in the state, for "Garudan Thookkam" performed on every "Pooram" of the Malayalam month "Meenam". Shiva, ayyappa, and naga are also worshiped at the temple. Pooram is the most famous celebration.

== Main landmarks and Places of worship ==
=== Arayankavu Bhagavathy Temple ===
Situated in the heart of Arayankavu and the temple owned by Puthuvamana Devaswom Trust hosts the famous festival consisting of Garudan Thookkam.

=== Trippakkudam Mahadeva Temple ===
Situated 1 km away from Arayankavu. Construction of the Temple was very ancient. One of the peculiarity of the temple is that Two automated sivalingas were worshiped in the same peeda and both the sivalinga are considered as same deity (Mahadeva). This temple is famous for "Parvathimangalam" vazhipadu wherein it is believed that Parvathy herself prepared food overnight and served to Siva as "Annapoorneswary". This food is then served to Brahmins and to "Bhoothaganas" in the place specified inside the temple. This vazhipad is unique and purposeful for anyone seeking any wishes of his/her worldly life. Recently a Vishnuvigraham obtained from the premises of the Mahadeva temple were installed by constructing a new temple nearby the main temple. This Vishnuvigraham was also very ancient believed to have worshiped longtime before.

=== Hidayathul Islam Jumaa Masjid ===
Situated in the heart of Arayankavu, opposite to Devi Kshethram and the Homeo clinic. The mosque is three storied which has a lot of space for eidul fithar prayers. The Ifthar party in fasting time in the masjid is very famous.

=== St.Mary's church Thottara ===
The church is situated at Thottara, 1 km from arayankavu bus stop. The church is under kotayam arch diocese.

=== Kanjiramattom mosque ===
The mosque is situated at Kanjiramattom, 3 km from Arayankavu. It is believed that the mosque was erected over the mortal remains of a Muslim saint, Sheikh Faridudheen. Another great Muslim saint, Baver, is supposed to have prayed here and attained salvation. The Kodikuthu festival, which falls in 13 to 15 January, is a major attraction for thousands of devotees.

=== Perumpilly Symhasana Church ===
The church has a small museum where the belongings of Parumala Thirumeni are preserved. It is located 6 km away from Arayankavu town.

=== Ameda Serpent Temple ===
The temple is known for strict rituals and its devotion to the Serpent God. Large number of devotees comes here every day to offer prayers. It is around 10 km away from Arayankavu.

=== Akshaya E Centre Arayankavu ===
Akshaya Centre is located at the bus stop itself opposite to Bhagavathy temple.

== Demographics ==
- Headquarters: Kochi (Kakkanad)
- Religion: Hindus account for the largest community, followed by Christians and Muslims.
- Average rainfall (yearly): 3432 mm
- Temperature: between 35 and 23 °C

== Geography and climate ==
It is about 30 km south-east of Ernakulam and 18 km east of Tripunithura. By road, Arayankavu is easily accessible from Kanjiramattom (4 km), Tripunithura and Ernakulam. Kanjiramattom Railway Station is the local railhead. Cochin International Airport is the nearest airport.

Arayankavu has an average elevation of 7 metres from sea level. Arayankavu town is situated in the basin of Vembanad backwaters which is formed from several streams in the Western Ghats. As per division of places in Kerala as Highlands, Midlands and Lowlands based on altitude, Arayankavu is considered to be part of the lower Midlands. The general soil type is alluvial soil. The vegetation is mainly tropical evergreen and moist deciduous type.

The climate in this place is moderate and pleasant. Arayankav's proximity to the equator results in little seasonal temperature variation, with moderate to high levels of humidity. Annual temperatures range between 20 and 35 °C (68 and 95 °F). From June through September, the south-west monsoon brings in heavy rains as arayankavu lies on the windward side of the Western Ghats. From October to December, arayankavu receives light rain from the northwest monsoon, as it lies on the leeward side. Average annual rainfall is 3600 mm. Arayankavu is bordered by Neerpara on the south, back waters on the west, kanjiramattom on the north and thottara puncha on the east.

== Industrial Situation ==
Arayankavu is home for a portion of the industrial base of Kochi. It is home for industrial area of Amballoor grama panchayath. It provides space for productive works.
