= Chavittu Nadakam =

Indian folk dance drama

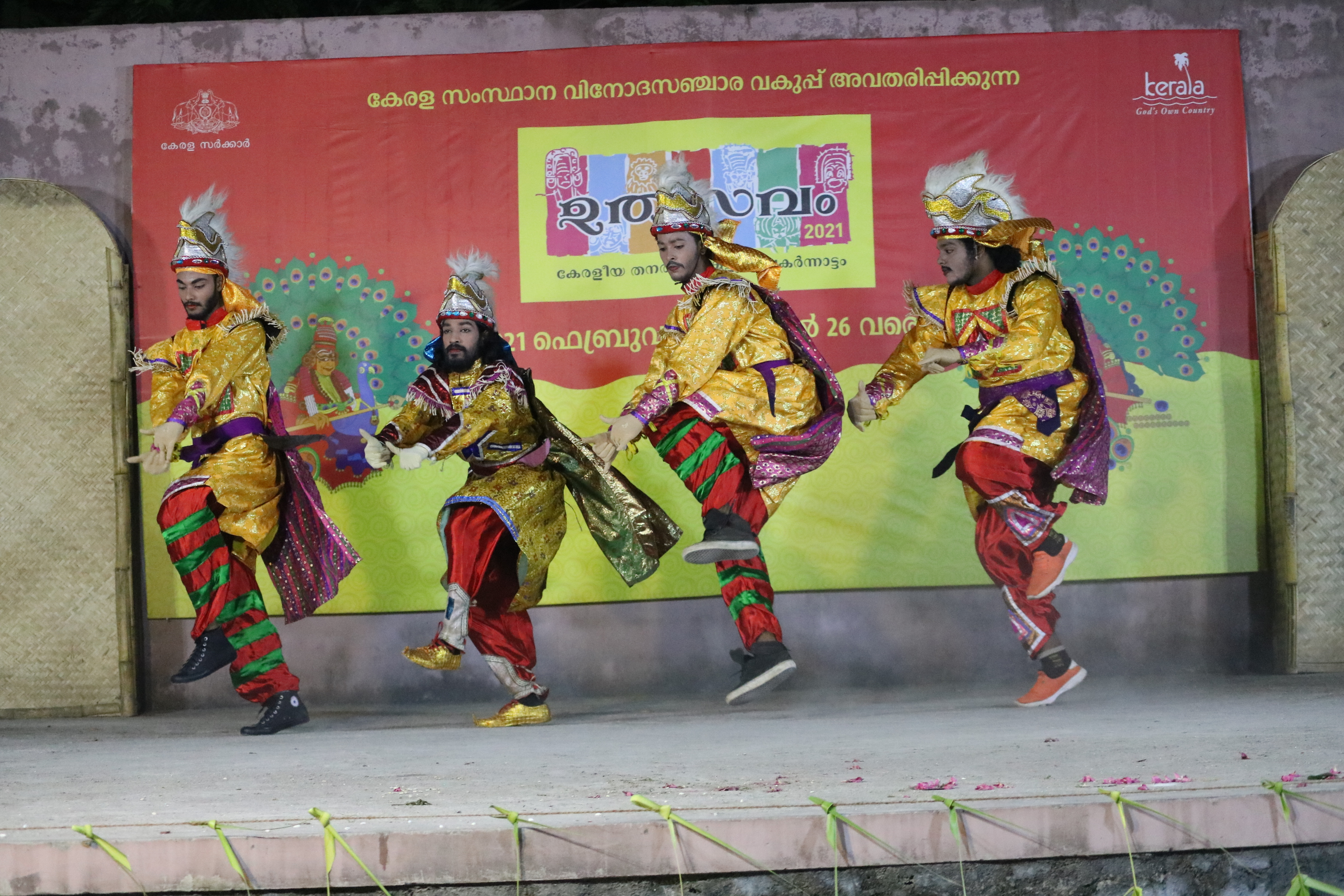
- Karalman charitham Chavittu Nadakam
- Native name: ചവിട്ടുനാടകം (Malayalam)
- Genre: Mucical dance drama
- Instrument(s): Chenda, Elathalam, Maddalam
- Origin: Kerala, India

Chavittu Nadakam (Malayalam:ചവിട്ടുനാടകം) is a highly colorful Latin Christian classical art form that originated in Cochin, Kerala state in India.

Chavittu Nadakam (Malayalam: ചവിട്ടുനാടകം) is a form of theatre originating in Kerala state in India, supposedly the city of Fort Kochi, associated with the Latin Christians of the region. It is noted for its flamboyant make-up discipline, elaborate costuming and detail to gesture and body movements. This art form highly resembles European opera. Traditionally performed with only drums and vocals, it is today accompanied by modern instruments and represents a fusion of Indian, Christian and European influences.

== Etymology ==
'Chavittu Nadakam' literally means a play that emphasizes step (Chavittu in Malayalam).

== Overview ==
Popular among the Latin Christians in the coastal areas of Kerala from Chavakkad north of Kodungallur to Kollam in the south, this art form combines acting, singing, dancing and steps of Kalaripayattu. In content and presentation, Chavittu Natakam is modeled after the theatrical forms of medieval Europe.

== History ==
Chaviitu Nadakam is a Latin Christian folk art form of Kerala. It is originated in Cochin where the Latin Christian Portuguese missionaries have instituted their first mission. Chavittu Nadakam is believed to be originated after the arrival of Portuguese to the Kerala shores. The reason behind this assumption is that Chavittu Nadakam has a significant European character in its costumes and outfits. But there are historical evidences that Kerala had connections with the western world well before the arrival of Portuguese. Even though some argue that the Chavittu Nadakam is created by Portuguese as they felt cultural emptiness when they arrived at Kerala, there is no evidence supporting this view. Also the fact that Chavittu Nadakam uses language for its playback songs and dialogue, suggest that the art form is indigenous in origin. Although this musical play is based on Christian mythology and western influence is evident in the Greco-Roman style dress and stage decoration, the language used is a mixture of Tamil and Malayalam.

There are also claims that a Tamil named Chinnathambi Annavi as the founder of this art form in 16th century at Mattancherry. He is the author of one of the most famous play ‘Karalman Charitham’ (the story of Emperor Charlemagne aka Charles the Great), which is thought to be the first Chavittu Natakam. The art form was active from Kollam to Kodungallur at its peak. There were also other writers like Vedanayakam Pillai, a native of Neyyoor, Kanyakumari. In earlier days this art form was mostly encouraged by the Tamil population and were staged in church premises. Sanjon Annavi, Vareechan Annavi, Cherrechan Annavi, Anthony Annavi, Brazeena Natakam, Ouseph Natakam, Kathrina Natakam, Santi Claus Natakam, Karlman Natakam, daveed vijayam, Martin katha and Jnana Sundari were some of the popular plays of early days. Chavittu Nadakam attained the style and form of the operas of Europe under the influence of Portuguese and European missionaries who propagated catholic belief in coastal regions of Kerala. The Syrian Christians of Kerala who lived inland didn't show any inclination for the art and thus its popularity was confined to Latin Catholic community.

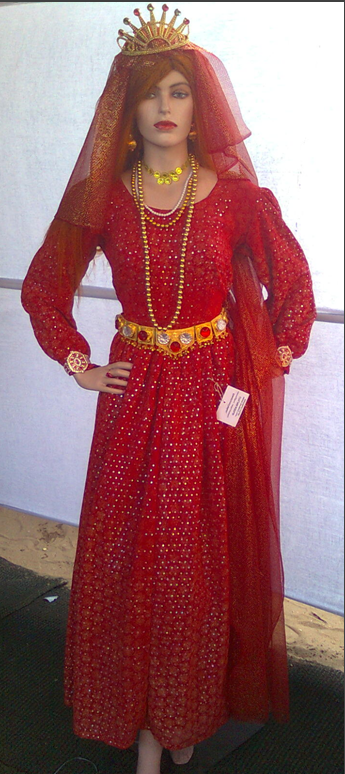
Original Chavittu Nadakam costumes: Queen Brijeena from Brijeena Charitham play

== Performance ==
Chavittu Nadakam is usually performed on open stages. Sometimes the interior of a church is also a venue. The performers wear glittering European costumes. The stage is set up over wooden planks. The training master is known as Annavi. The whole play is performed through musicals. Dance and instrumental music are combined in this art form. The bell and drum are two instruments used as background score. The percussion instruments Pada Thamber and Maravaladi provides the rhythm. The actors themselves sing and act. Though it used to be an open stage performance, in the recent times this is mostly played indoor. The predominant feature of this art is the artists stamping / pounding (Chavittu) the dance floor producing resonant sounds to accentuate the dramatic situations. The actors sing their lines loudly and with exaggerated gestures stamp with great force on the wooden stage. Hence literally Chavittu Nadakam means 'Stamping Drama'. Great stress is laid on the step, which goes in harmony with the songs. In these art forms there is a great importance for dance and art. Foot stamping dance, fighting and fencing are the essential part of Chavittunadakam. Royal dresses and ornamental costumes are necessary.

Steps are important in Chavittu Natakam. The basic steps in the dance are divided into irattippukal (couplets), kalashangal (culminations), idakalashangal (interludes) and kavithangal (rhymes). Good characters and villains have different style of steps. Female actors have feminine steps.

The play is considered a success if at the end, the stage cave into the pressure of heavy stamping.

== Stage ==
The stage where Chavittu Natakam is performed is called Thattu. Thattu is made by laying planks in such a way that they make a sound when stepped on. The width of the roof is 16 inches and the length is 50-60 inches. There should be a height of one and a half cubits from the floor and the lamp should be hung in the arena. A chandelier was also used. A large cross is also placed nearby, next to which the chair and the musicians stand facing the audience.

Generally performed in public venues, this art is sometimes performed inside churches also.

== The costume ==
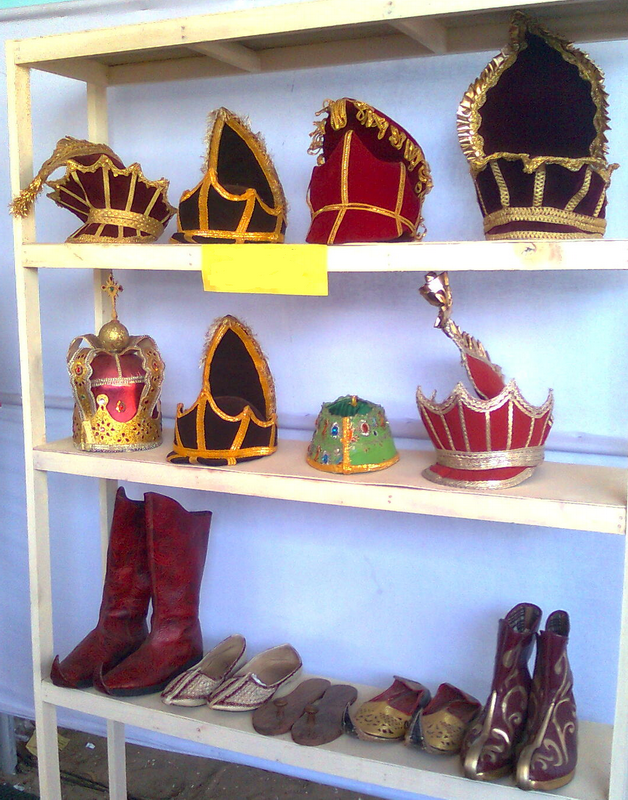
The costumes used in Chavittu Nadakam

Chavittu Natakam has attractive costumes for all characters. The characters are generally dressed in roles reminiscent of ancient Greco-Roman soldiers and European kings. Colored papers and silk cassava velvet cloth are used to make costumes. There are also battle dress, helmet, stockings, crown, scepter and gloves.

== Instruments ==
Instruments such as chenda, patathamper, maddalam and elathalam are used in Chavittu Natakam. In recent times, musical instruments like tabla, fiddle, flute and bulbul have also been used.

== Roles ==
=== Katiyakaran ===
Katiyakaran plays an important role in Chavittu Natakam. The main task of this clown like performer is to entertain the audience with a pleasant interpretation. The Katiyakaran enter the stage wearing a fringed cap, a red beard and moustache, and a garb with two rows of fangs.

=== Stutiyogar ===
Stutiyogars also known as sutradharas or balaparts are another role in Chavittu Natakam. Boys aged 10–12 will play this role.

=== Todaya penkal ===
Thodaya penkal are female characters, performed by men. They will sing the praises of the Mother Mary. They are characterized by slow steps.

=== Rajavu (king) ===
In Chavati Natakam, the king's court scene will be shown first. The king is given a dazzling dress and costumes.

=== Manthri (Minister) ===
The minister has a lead role in Chavittu Natakam. It is the minister who accompanies the king on a hunt or in battle. The minister also have dazzling dress and costumes.

== Practice ==
After lighting the lamp in front of the cross and giving Dakshina to Asan (master), the practice begins with bowing the drama book called Chuvadi. The ceremony of obeisance to the Asan and book is known as Vazhangal. The training in kalari (teaching school), which lasts for two years, includes training in weapons such as sticks, swords and spears. Once the weapon training is complete, the acting main will begin. This training include body language including hands, eyes, and rhythmic steps that can make acting more effective. Because the steps and body movements are important, the actors will be given a body massage called meyyuzhichil to relax the body. After each actor completes his training, debut performance will be made first at the kalari, before entering the stage performance.

== Librettos ==
The stories are mostly the heroic episodes of Bible or great Christian warriors. Historical incidents, the life and adventure of heroes like Charlemagne; stories of Alexander were the themes of Chavittu Nadakam in the 16th century. In the 18th century, spiritual themes like "Allesu-Nadakam", "Cathareena Nadakam", the victory of the Isaac, etc. were the themes. In the 19th century moral themes like "Sathyapalan"; "Njanasundhari", "Komala Chandrika", "Anjelica", "karlsman" were handled.

== Most popular Chavittu Nadakam plays ==
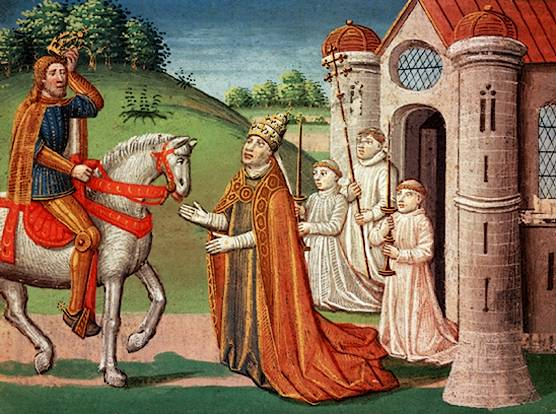
The Frankish King Charlemagne was a devout Latin Catholic. Shown here, the Pope asks Charlemagne for help at a meeting near Rome

- Carelman Charitham (Charlemagne the Great)
- Brijeena Charitham (Life of Queen Brijeena)
- St. Sebastian
- Daveedhum Goliyathum (David and Goliath)
- Mahanaya Alexander (Alexander the Great)
- Veerayodhakkalude Anthyam (Death of Great warriors)

== Gallery ==
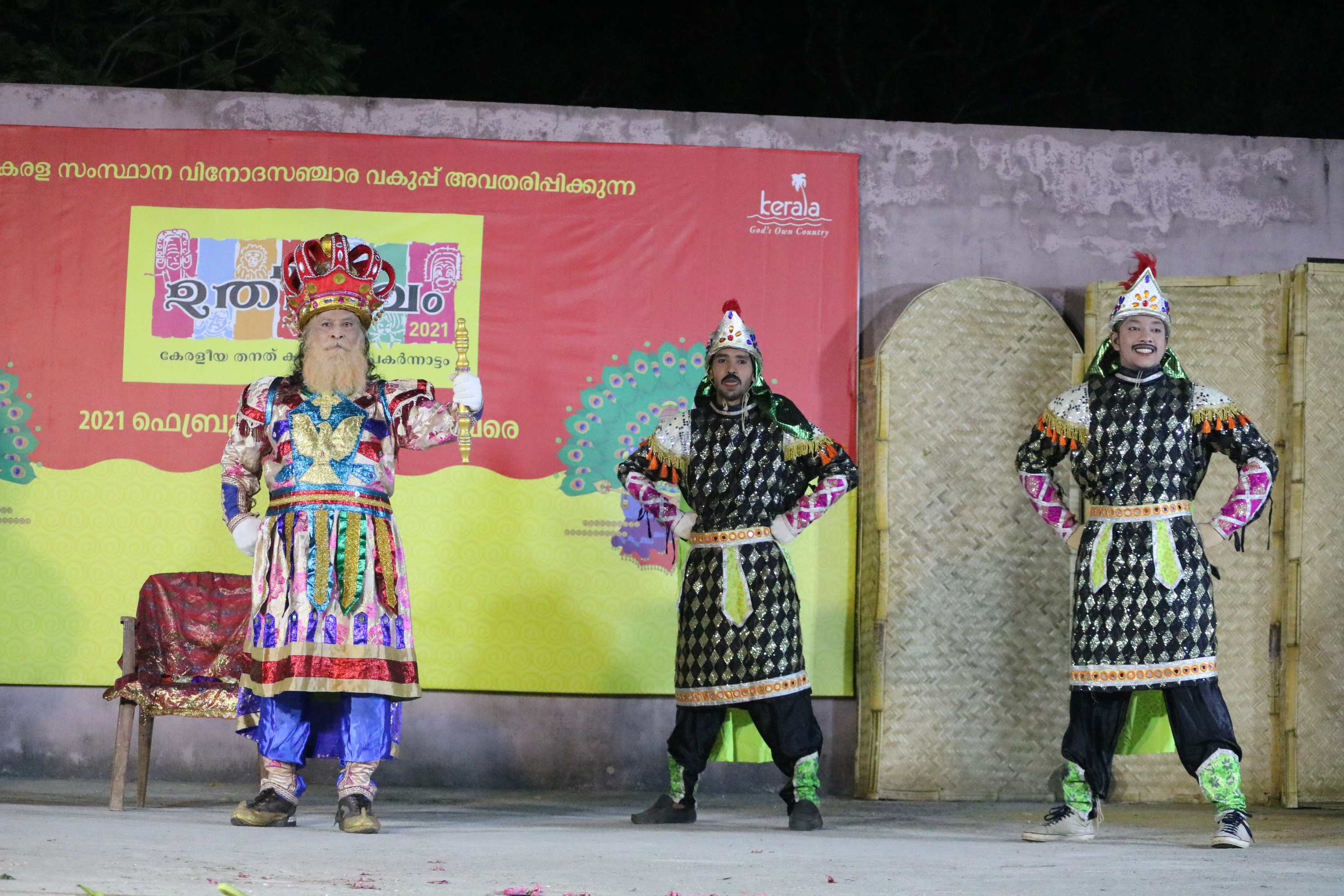
Chavittu Nadakam

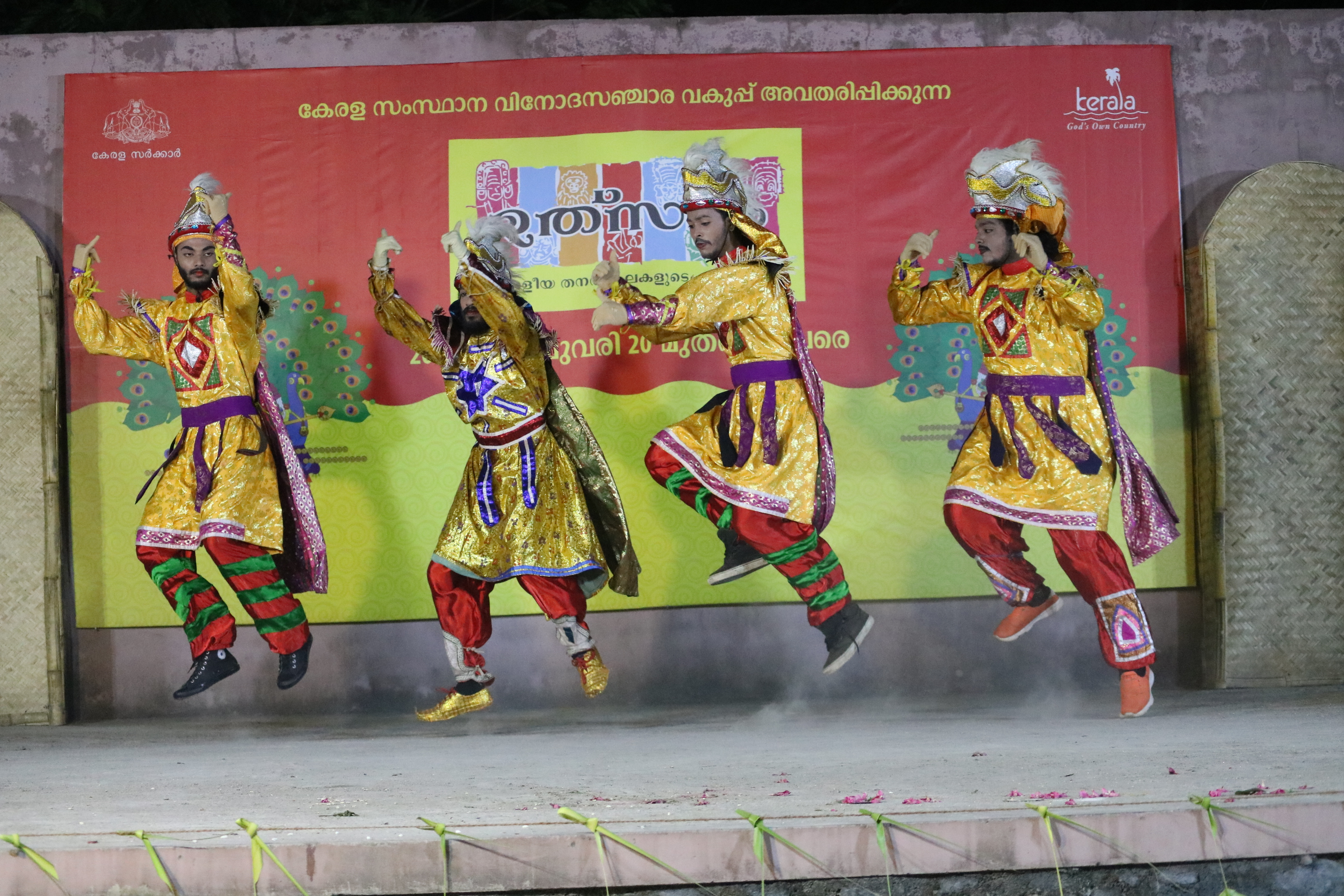
Chavittu Nadakam

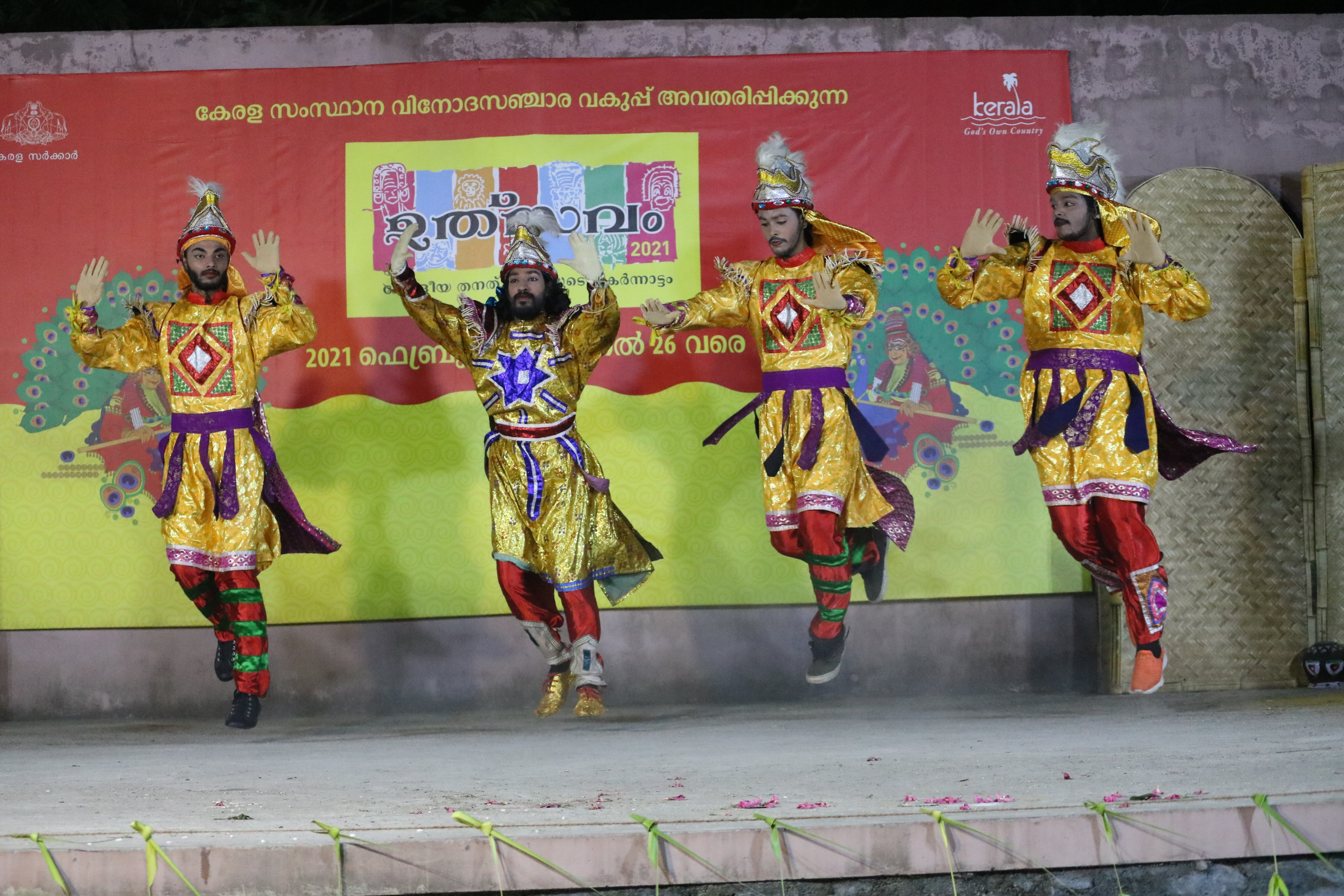
Chavittu Nadakam

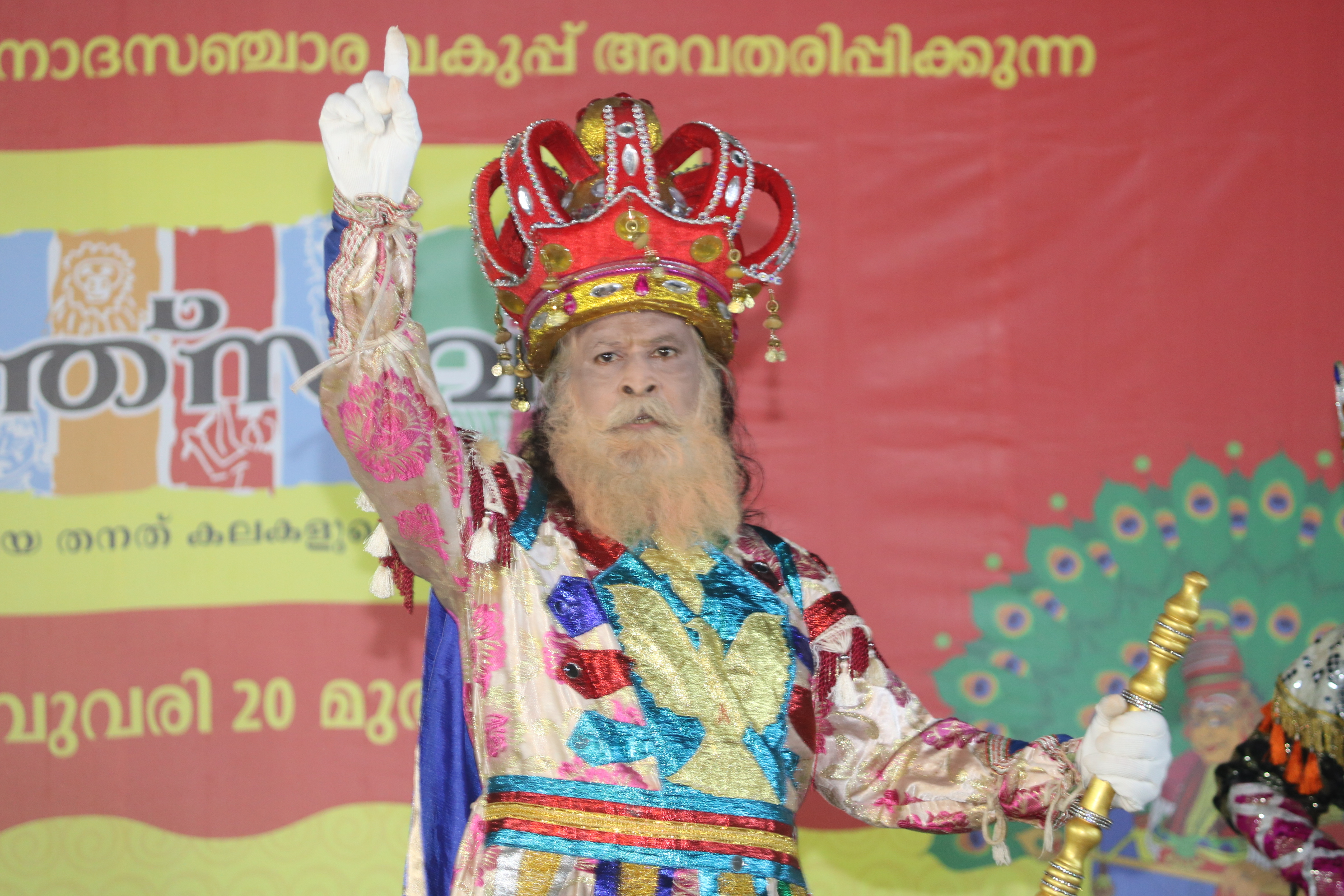
Chavittu Nadakam

== See also ==
- Margam Kali
- Slama Carol
- Kerala Folklore Academy
- Thumpoly Church
