= Charadupinnikkali =

South Indian dance form

Charadupinnikali (Malayalam: ചരടുപിന്നിക്കളി - literally 'string dance') or Urikkali is a dance form practiced in South Kerala and by ex-pat communities in other countries. The play is performed holding the cords hung at the place of performance. At the end of play, the cords become a rough form of uri and later the uri is undone. This makes a part of Thiruvathira.

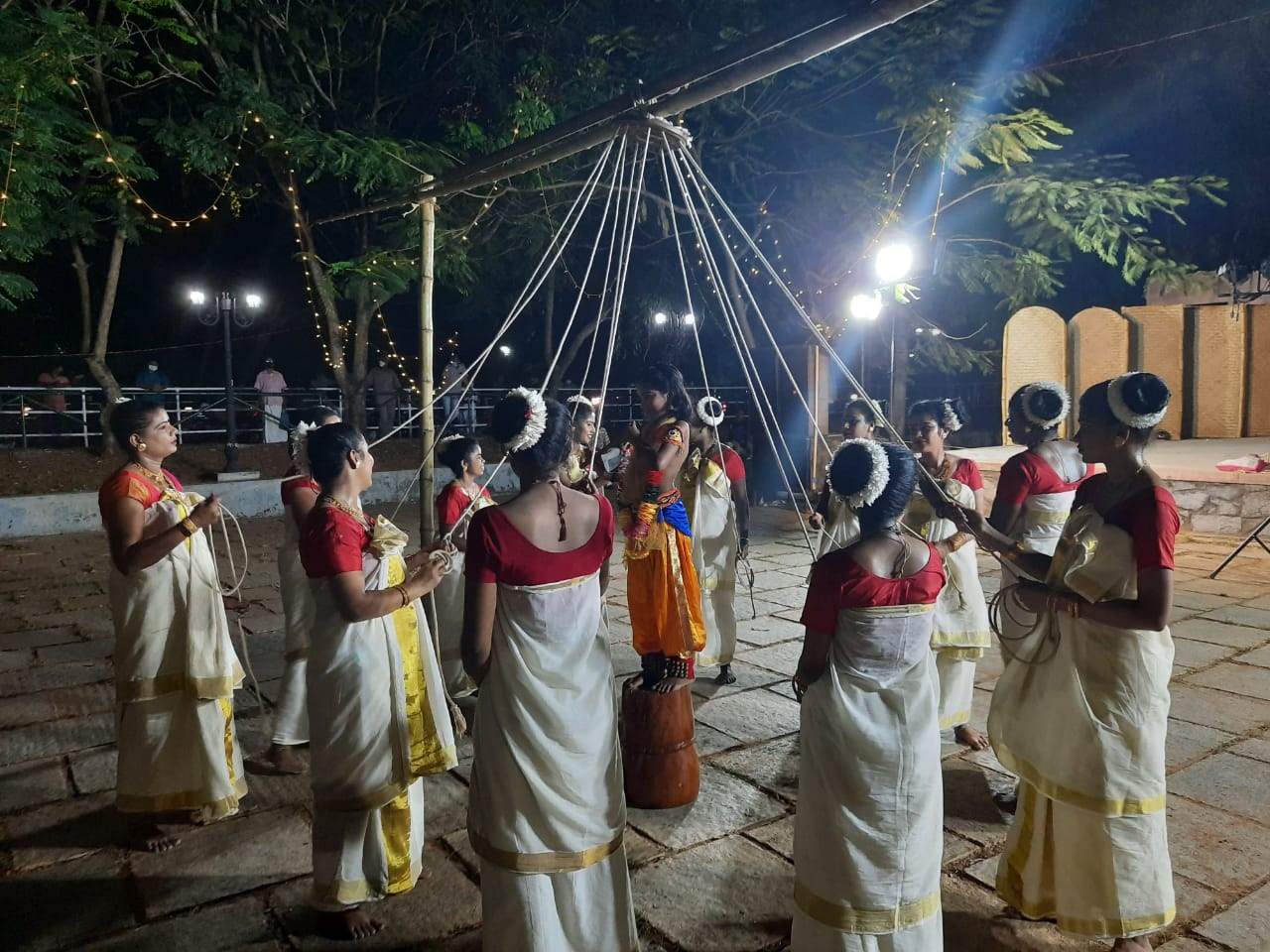
ചരടു പിന്നിക്കളി

== See also ==
- Arts of Kerala
