= Mayilpeeli Thookkam =

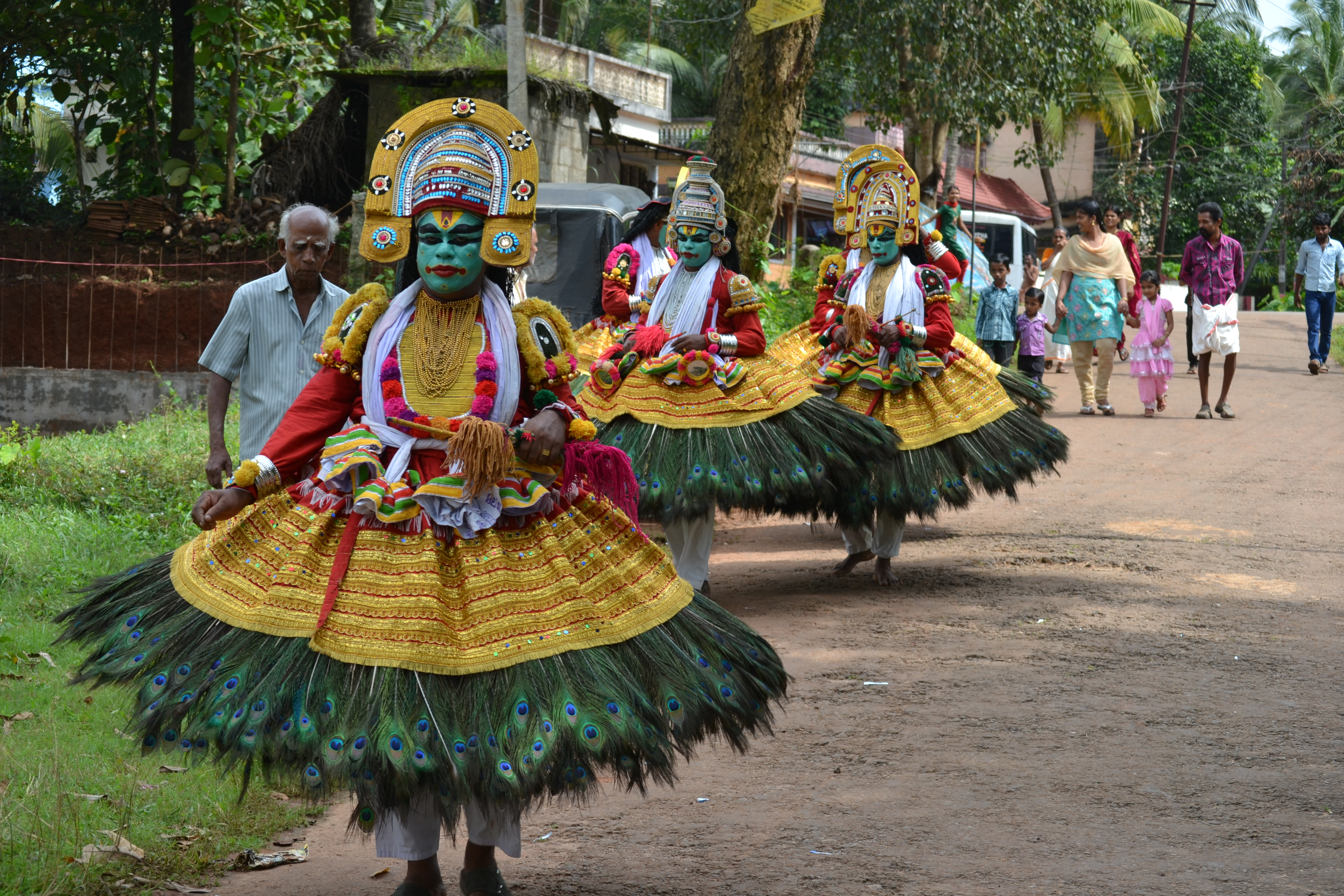
Arjuna Nritham dancers

Mayilpeeli Thookkam also called Arjuna Nritham (transl. the dance of Arjuna) is a ritual dance of Kerala primarily performed by men of the Ezhava community, and is prevalent in the Bhagavathy temples of south Kerala.

The name Arjuna Nritham is a reference to the Mahabharatha, in which Arjuna, one of the Pandava brothers and a renowned singer and dancer, is said to have propitiated goddess Bhadrakali by a devotional presentation. The costume and cosmetics worn by Arjuna Nritham dancers are meant to mimic the appearance of Arjuna.

The costume for Mayilpeeli Thookkam includes a characteristic garment made of mayilppeeli (peacock feathers). This garment is worn around the waist in a similar fashion as the "uduthukettu" of Kathakali. The performers have their faces painted green and wear distinctive headgear (Nettipattom).

The dance in Mayilpeeli Thookkam is known as Pyattu. The movements are similar to Kalarippayattu techniques. The all-night performance of the dance form is usually performed solo or in pairs.

The strictly rhythm-based songs called "Kavithangal" depict stories from the Hindu Puranas. Each "Kavitham" is composed to suit a specific rhythm. Before each song, the dancers explain the intricacies of the particular rhythm to be performed and how this rhythm will be translated into dance movements. The musical accompaniment is comprised by percussion instruments like the chenda talachenda, and ilathalam (cymbals).

The dance is practiced by men of the Ezhava community as well as the Ashari and Kollan communities. It is performed mainly in the Kottayam and Alappuzha districts.

== See also ==
- Classical Indian dance
- Arts of Kerala
- Garudan Thookkam
