= Onavillu =

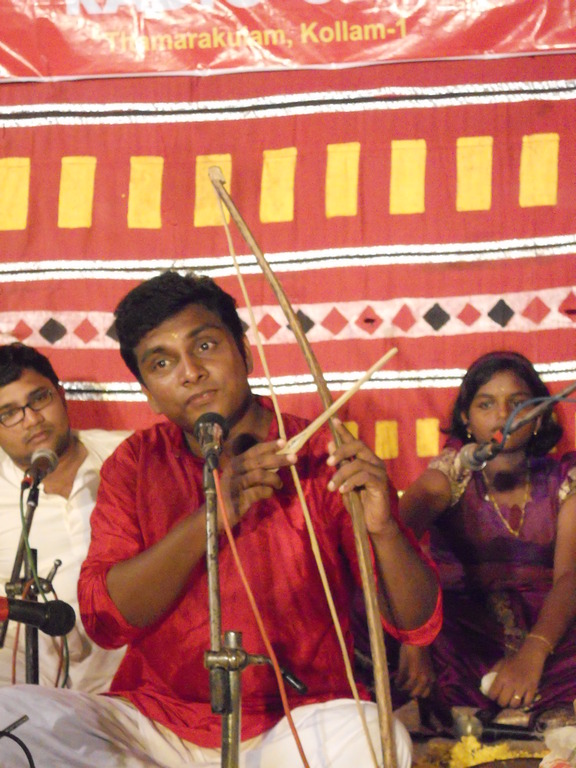

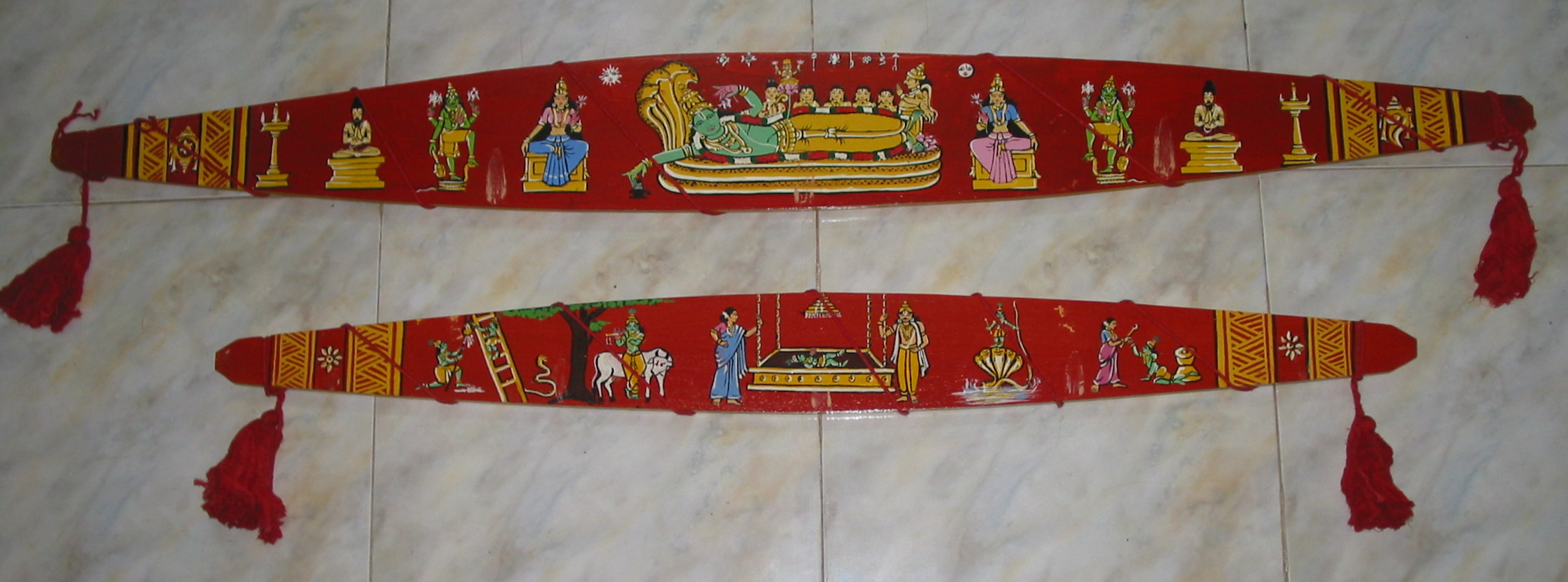
Onavillu decorated with painting of Lord Padmanabha (top) and Krishnaleela (bottom)

An onavillu is a simple, short, bow-shaped musical instrument. Its name may come from Onam, a festival in Kerala where the instrument is used in dances, and villu, which means 'bow' in Malayalam (and several other South Indian languages). Although still regularly used in rural art forms, use of the onavillu is on the decline.

Onavillu also refers to flat, tapered wooden artifacts decorated with tassels and used in ceremonies of devotion to Vishnu.

== Instrument ==
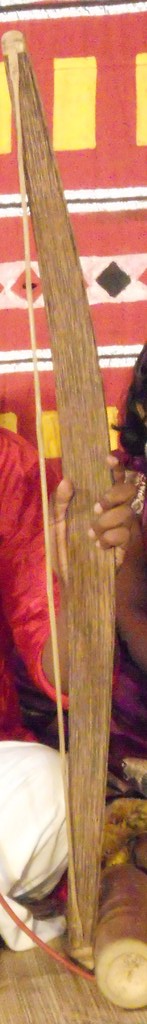

The onavillu that accompanies the Kummattikali and other folk dances is a Keralite string instrument made from the pith of the palmyra stem, or from bamboo, shaped as a bow. Bamboo slivers are used for bowstrings. The bow strings sound when struck with a thin stick, the size of a pencil. The sound can be varied through finger pressure on the string.

== Ceremonial bow ==
The ceremonial onavillu, which is not a musical instrument, is made from a flat piece of wood 1/2 inch thick, tapering on both sides. Sizes range from 3.5 feet by 4 inches to 4.5 feet by 6 inches. The wood of kadambu, maruthu, jack fruit, and aanjili trees are preferred (See List of Indian timber trees). The wood is cut to the required dimension before being decorated with miniature paintings of Anantha Sayanam (reclining pose of Vishnu) and avatars Dasavatharam, Rama Pattabhishekam and Krishna Leela. Ashari family residing near Pujapura Trivandrum are the right to make the red tassels used to adorn the bows.

The making of the ceremonial bows is the preserve of a local family.

=== Legend ===
According to legend, when King Mahabali was being pushed into the earth by Vamana, Vishnu appeared before him. Mahabali asked that each year he could be allowed to visit his native land and to see Vishnu. Vishnu granted him the boon, and said that the king would be able to see him and his avatars only as painted images. Vishvakarman was ordered to paint images of Dasavatharam on pieces of kadambu wood. This was the origin of the onavillu, which is put on display every year for Mahabali to see.

== Ceremonial use ==
On Thiruvonam day, the onavillu charthal is a dedication ceremony of the bows. They are then taken to Padmanabha Swamy temple on Thiru Onam day and displayed at the Natakasala before being offered to Vishnu's avatars (incarnations) Padmanabha, Narasimha, and Krishna.
