= Muttum Viliyum =

Muttum Viliyum (also known as Cheenimuttu) is a traditional orchestral musical performance art form popular among the Muslim community of Kerala, India. The name represents a unique confluence of three musical instruments that form the core of this traditional orchestra.

== Etymology ==
The term "Muttum Viliyum" derives from the Malayalam words referring to the three primary instruments used in the performance. It is also alternatively known as "Cheenimuttu" in certain regions of Kerala. Muttum Viliyum was once a regular feature in the agricultural, cultural, and religious festivals of Malabar, underscoring its historical importance in regional heritage.

== Musical instruments ==
Muttum Viliyum employs three traditional Kerala instruments:

- Kuzhal – a traditional wind instrument that serves as the melodic foundation of the orchestra.
- Chenda – a cylindrical percussion instrument that provides the rhythmic backbone of the performance.
- Cheriya Chenda – a smaller variant of the chenda that adds rhythmic complexity and variation to the ensemble.

== Cultural context ==
Muttum Viliyum is primarily performed within the Muslim communities of Kerala and represents an important aspect of the cultural heritage of Islam in Kerala. The art form demonstrates the synthesis of local Kerala musical traditions with the cultural practices of the Muslim community.

== See also ==
- Arts of Kerala
- Music of Kerala
- Islam in Kerala
