= Garudan Thookkam =

Ritual dance performed in Kali temples

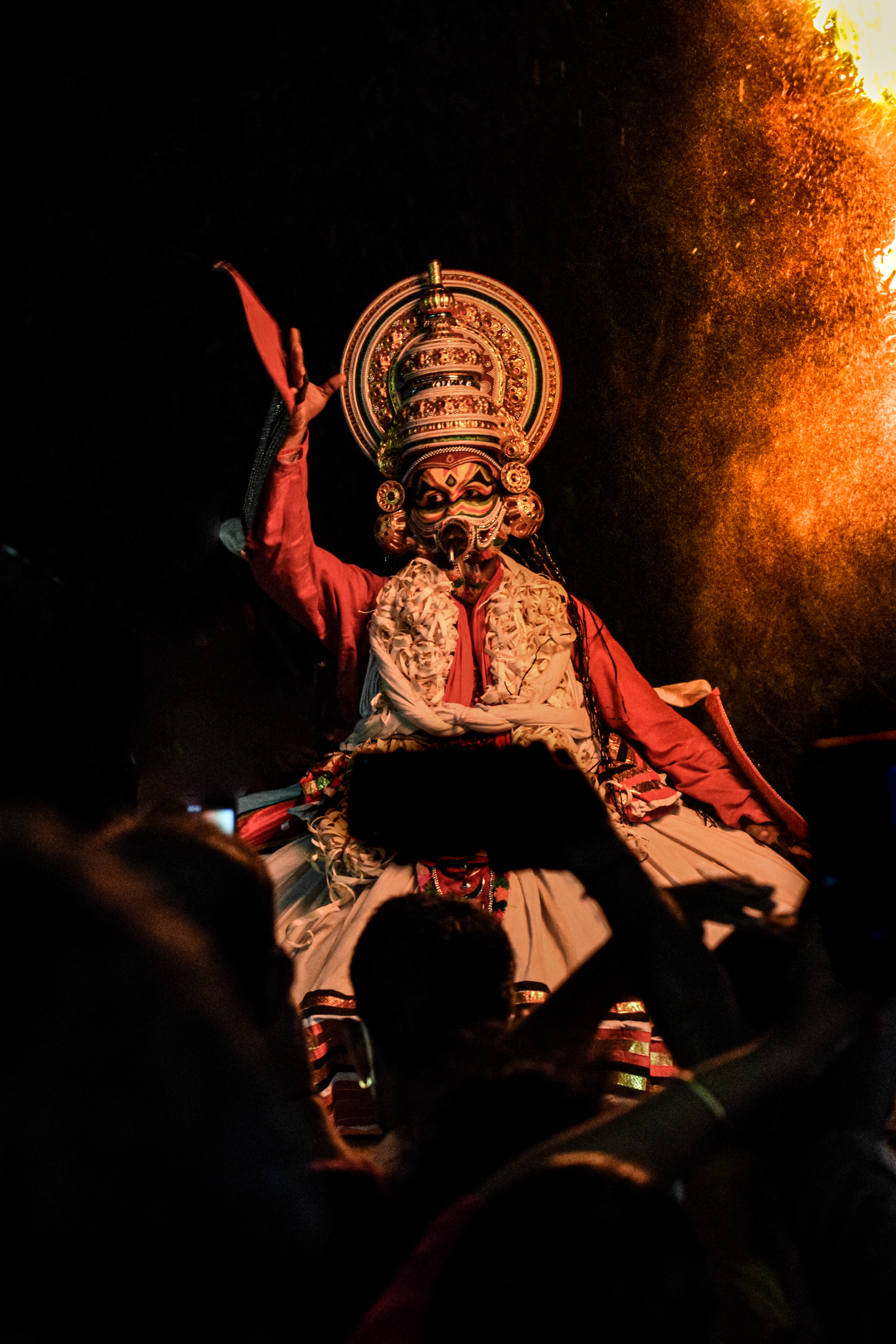
Garudan Thookkam

Garudan Thookkam is a ritual dance performed in certain Kali temples in Southern and Central parts of Kerala ( former Travancore kingdom) in south India. The dancers dress up as Garuda. After the dance performance, the hang-designate dangle from a shaft hooking the skin on his back. In some places, the ritual is performed colorfully with Garudas taken in a procession on bullock carts or boats or hand pulled carts. It will be available in Devi temple during the festival of Meena bharani and Pathamudayam in Thiruvanchoor in Kottayam district.

Legend has it that even after slaying Darika, Kali remained insatiable and thirsty. At this time Vishnu sent Garuda to Kali to quench the thirst. A dancing and bleeding Garuda was taken to Kali and only after getting some drops of blood from Garuda, Kali was pacified. The ritual is performed based on this belief.

Garudan Thookam is submitted as a reward for the problems solved in the abode of Goddess Kali. There is a famous Garudan Thookam at the Elamkavu Devi temple at Vadayar in Vaikkom taluk of Kottayam district. During the Aswathi, Bharani days of Meenam Month (Malayalam), more than 40 to 50 Garudan in the Thooka chadus, decorated and floated in thoni vallams (big country-boats), travel behind the Attuvela - a wooden structure constructed in the form of a three storied building which is considered as the floating temple of the Goddess Kali in the Moovattupuzha river. This is one of the best sights, with illuminated Structures. After the night long performance with the help of scores of chenda experts, the Garudans - bleeding after the Choondakuthal (Piercing of the skin on their back with a sharp metal hook) will be hung on a tall pedestal-like structure and taken thrice around the temple by the devotees. This is seen at the Pazhaveedu temple at Alappuzha district. But here the performance is done on a chariot-like structure on the road.

In Trivandrum, several devi temples have Garudan thookkam, which literally translated as "eagle hanging". Several hundreds of devotees offer this to satisfy their family deity "Bhadra kaali". Infants are also participated by their elders. During the performance it reminds the flight of Garuda ( the devine eagle), pouring flowers to devotees around the temple 3 times! The performers are dressed up like Garuda the divine eagle, aboard of Vishnu. Moreover, it's a reflection of Kerala's tradition and art.

This ritual is performed at Pallikkalkavu Bhagavathi temple (Njeezhoor, Kottayam (Dist)) on Makara Bharani day. This ritual was performed at Koottekkavu Bhagavathy temple (Amballoor, Ernakulam Dist) on Meenabharani. Arayankavu Bhagavathi temple Ernakulam dist (on Pooram, Meenam) and Irapuram Devi temple near perumbavoor (on Kumbha Bharani day) has the highest number of garduan thookkam in Kerala. More than 100 Garudan performers perform in these temples every year. Arayankavu Bhagavathy temple holds the world record for presenting the largest performance of Garudan thookkam.

Garudanthoookam is also performed in Polassery Bhagavathi temple in [Polassery, vaikom] in Kottayam district on meenabharani. Garudanthookam is performed in this temple in every year.

== See also ==
- Kathakali
- Mayilpeeli Thookkam
