= Poorakkali =

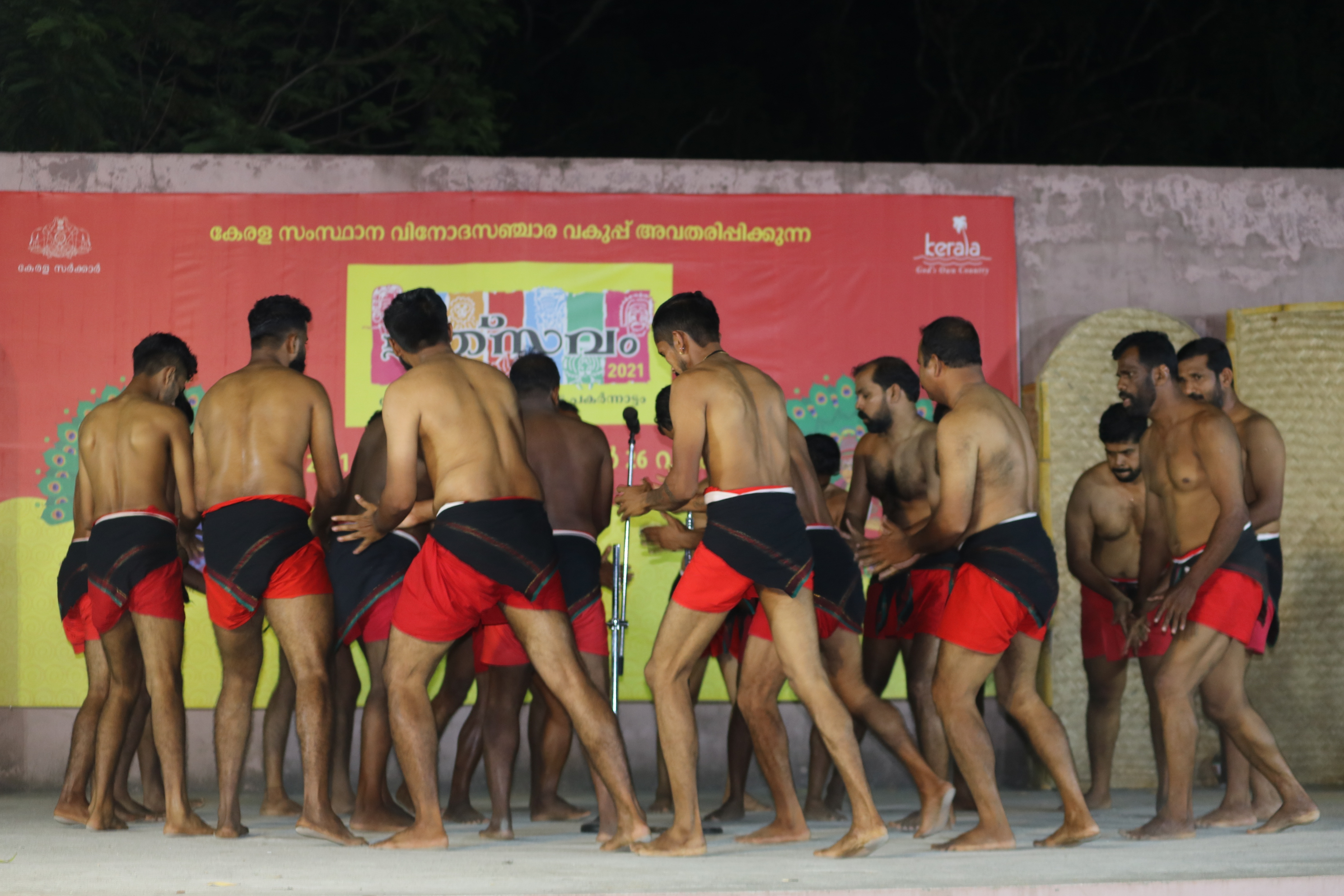
Thiyya Poorakkali performance

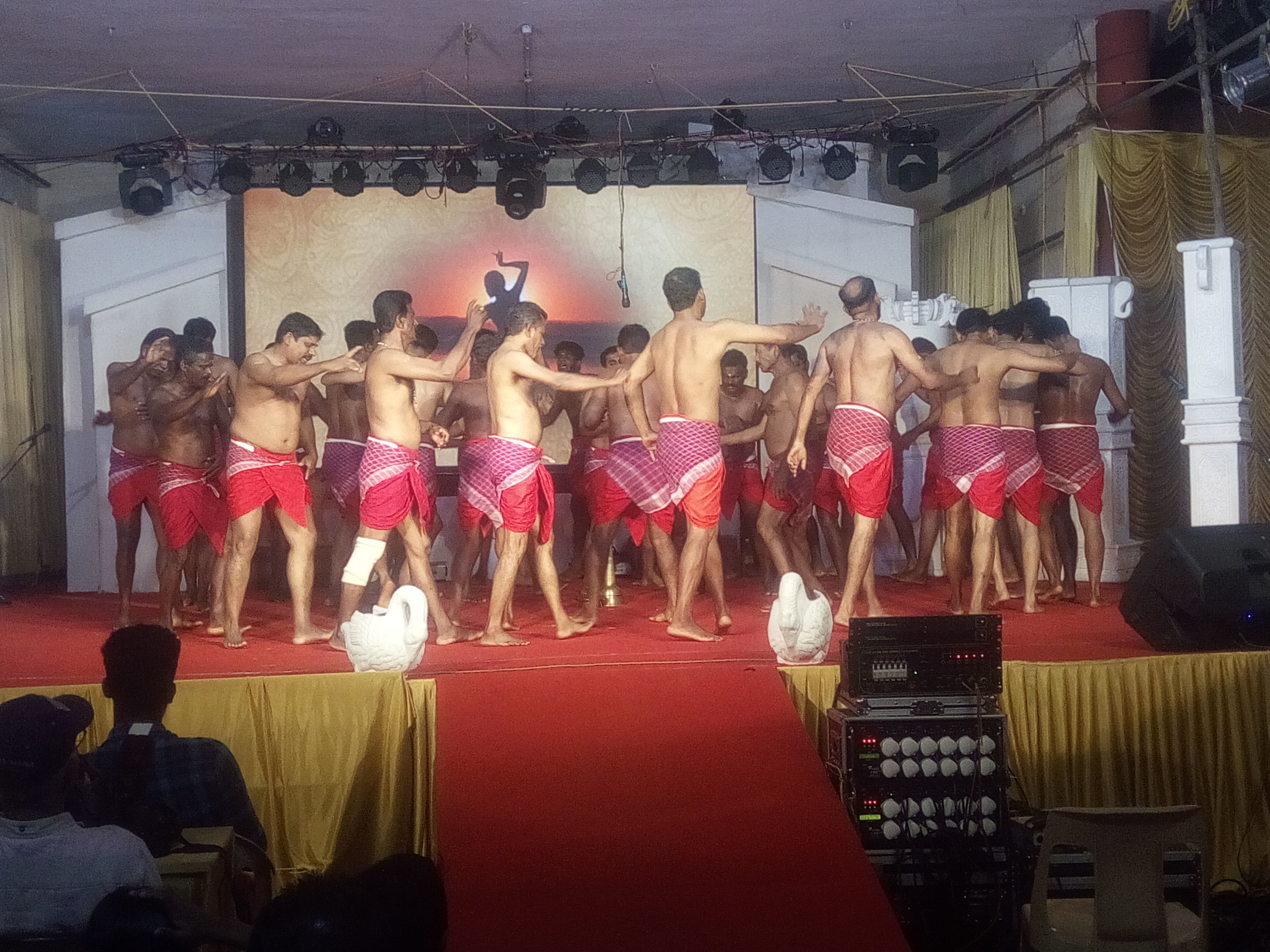
A Maniyani Poorakkali performance on stage

Poorakkali (meaning Festival Performance) is a traditional dance ritual performed by men during the nine-day Pooram Thiyya festival in Bhagavathy temples across North Malabar in Kerala State of south India.

The Pooram festival begins with the Karthika asterism and concludes with the Pooram asterism of the month of Meenam according to the Malayalam calendar (corresponding to the sun sign Pisces according to the Julian Calendar) to honour Kamadeva, the god of love.

The performers come from different sects like Thiyya, Maniyani, Nambiar etc. The basis of Poorakkali essentially is the memories of Vasanthapooja performed by inmates of different worlds like heaven, earth etc. Poorakkali spreads knowledge and entertainment. The show steals the hearts of audience with melodious songs and befitting body movements. The Panickers are well-known names in the world of Poorakkali and have contributed much to the survival and expansion of this art form.

== Story ==
Kamadeva (the Hindu god of love), tries to awaken Shiva to the amorous advances of Parvati. He is burned to ashes by the fire emanating from Shiva's third eye. To bring love and joy back to the earth, that is left barren after Kama’s death, Vishnu instructs heavenly goddesses Rambha to create Kama’s figure with flowers and to sing and dance. Women on earth continued to sing and dance to celebrate Kama’s reincarnation. In the course of time, men took charge of the festivities, though young girls continue to play an integral role in the rituals.

== Style ==
The Poorakkali dance itself is performed by a troop of young men decked in lion costumes around a huge, multi-tiered, lit lamp, also known as a "nilavilukku." The dance involves masculine movements and acrobatic, martial art steps. No singers or musicians accompany the dance; instead, the dancers themselves keep rhythm by singing, clapping and executing synchronised foot-thumping movements. The dancers usually observe a month of abstinence and undergo strenuous practice before the performance. Most of the songs sung are hymns from Ramayana, Mahabharata or Bhagavata. The leader of the group, known by the name Panicker, sings the song, and the lines are repeated in chorus by the other dancers. Certain rituals are performed before the dance starts.

== Variants of Poorakkali ==
Marathukali is a variant of Poorakkali. This is a form performed by two parties competently. The ordinary play lacks the competent mood displayed in Marathukali. Big disputes ensue between two parties while performance is on and learned people dissuade both parties from further confrontation.

== See also ==
- Arts of Kerala
- Kerala Folklore Academy
- Poomala bhagavathy

== Further Study ==
- Video of Poorakkali

== Gallery ==
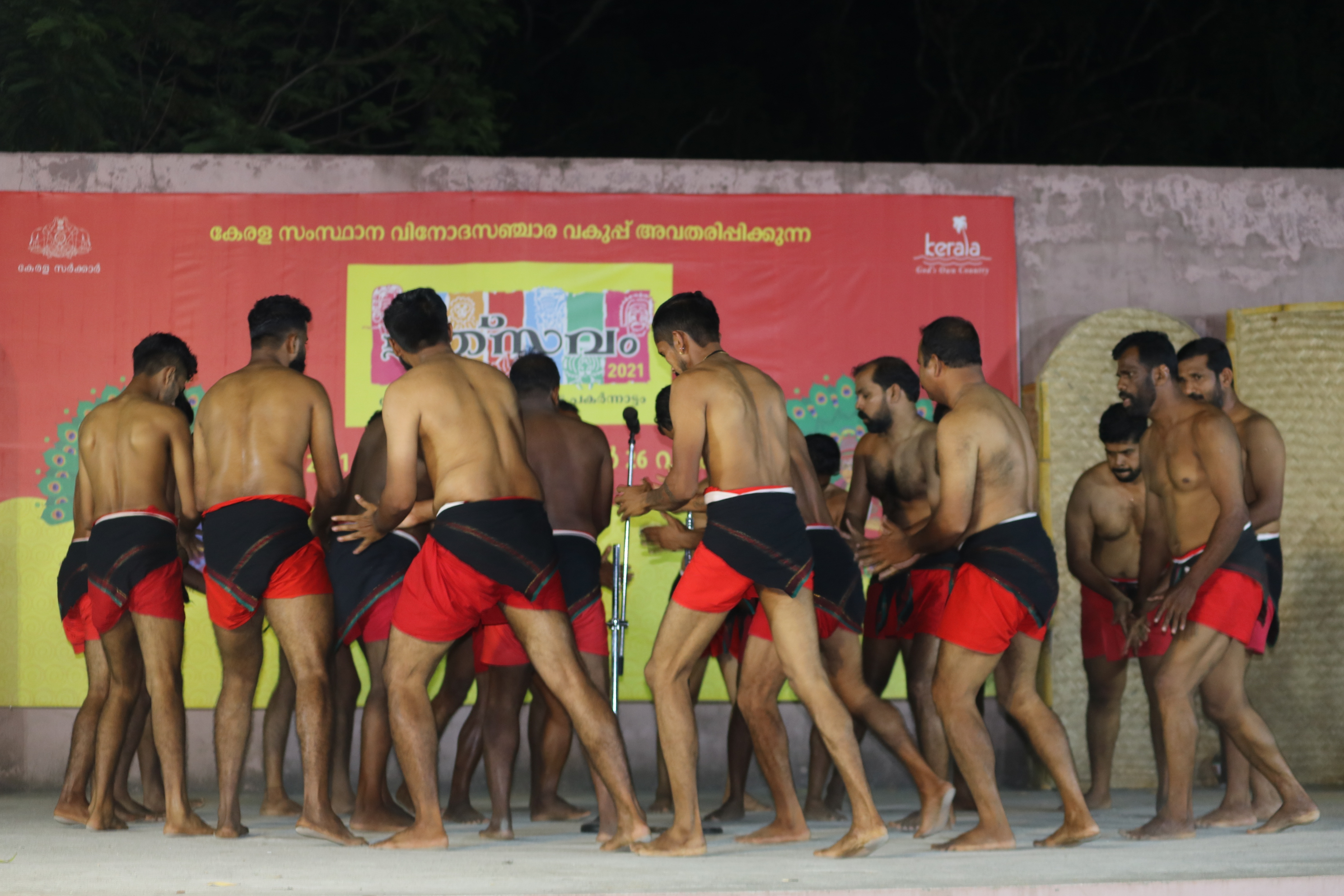
Poorakkali

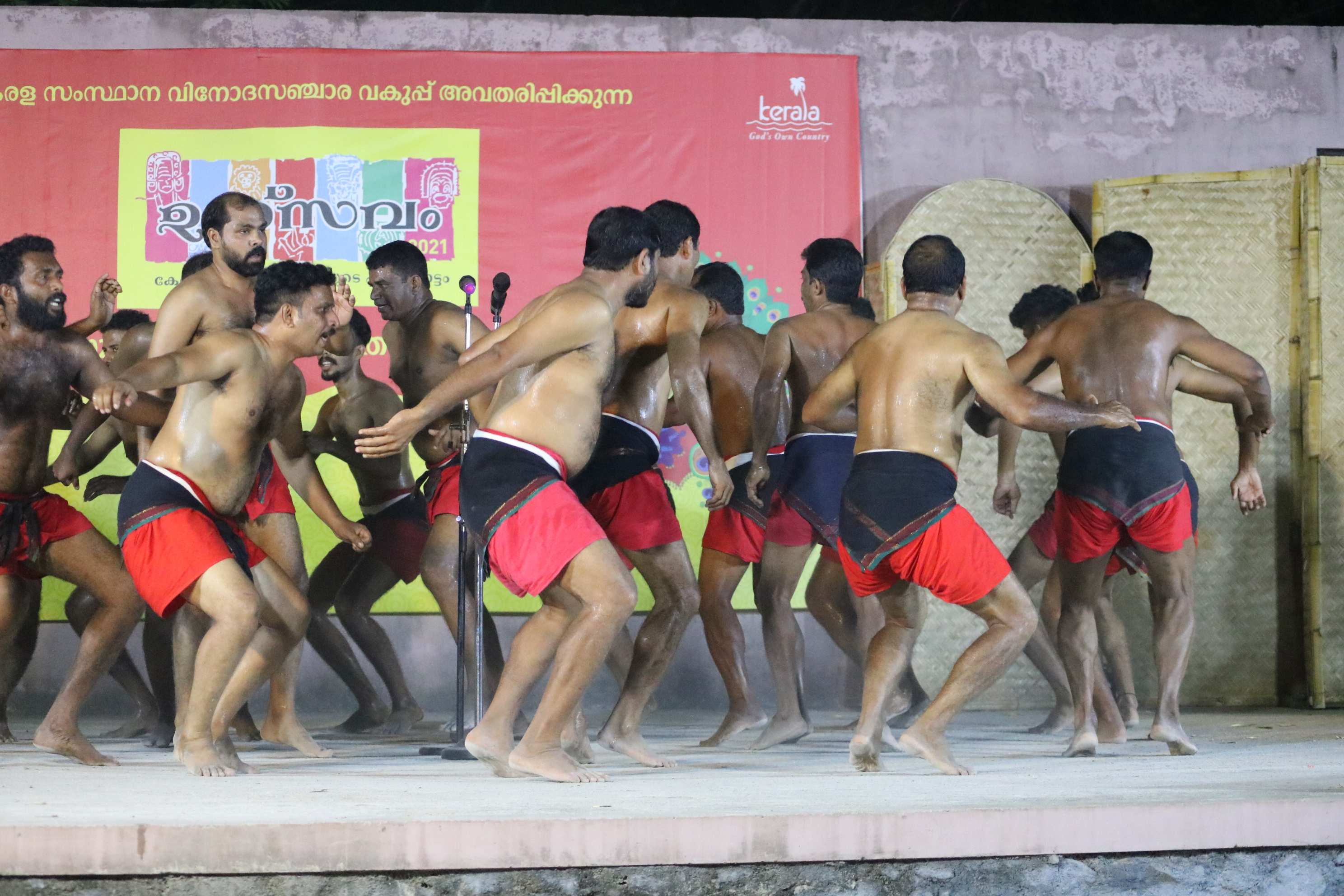
Poorakkali

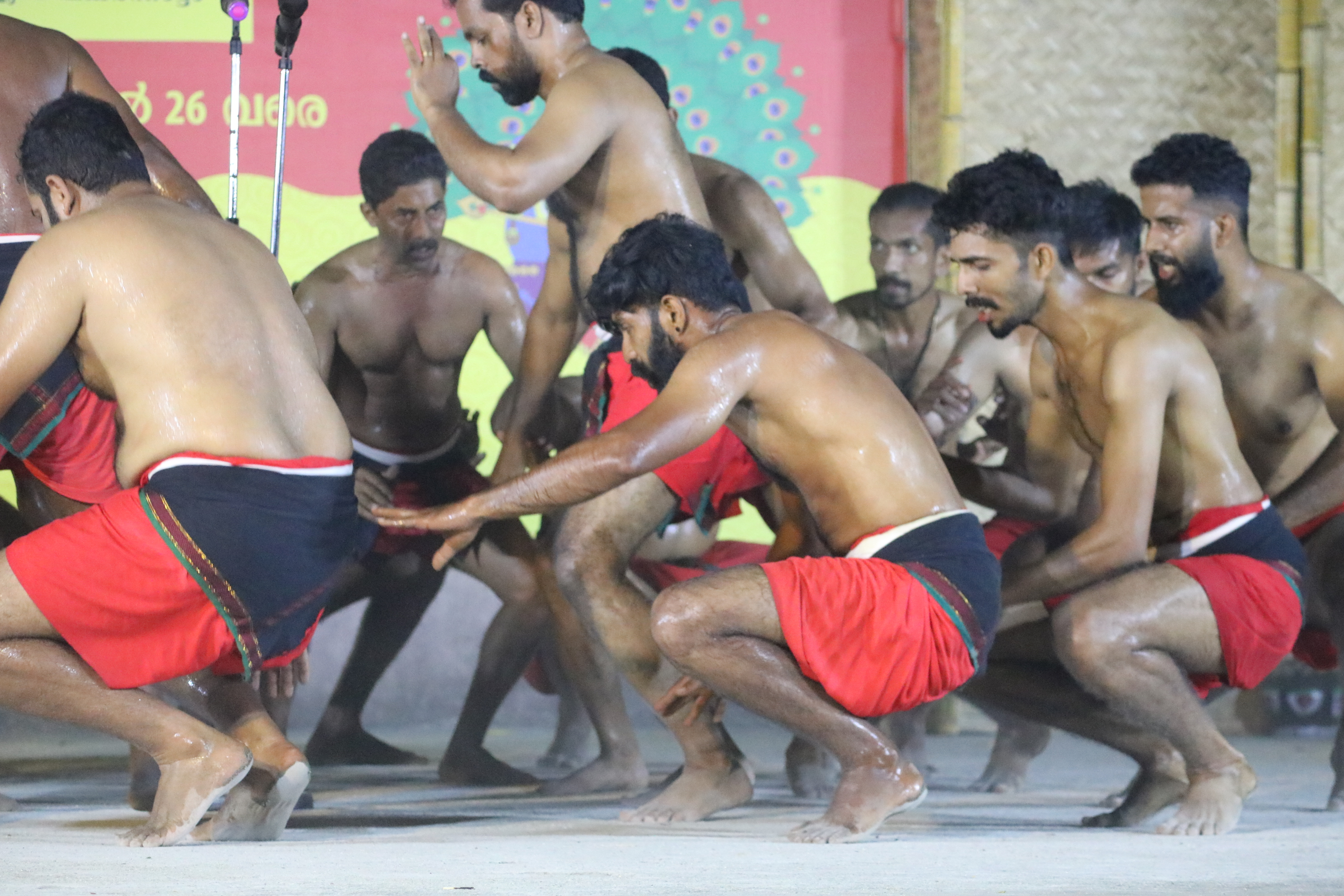
Poorakkali

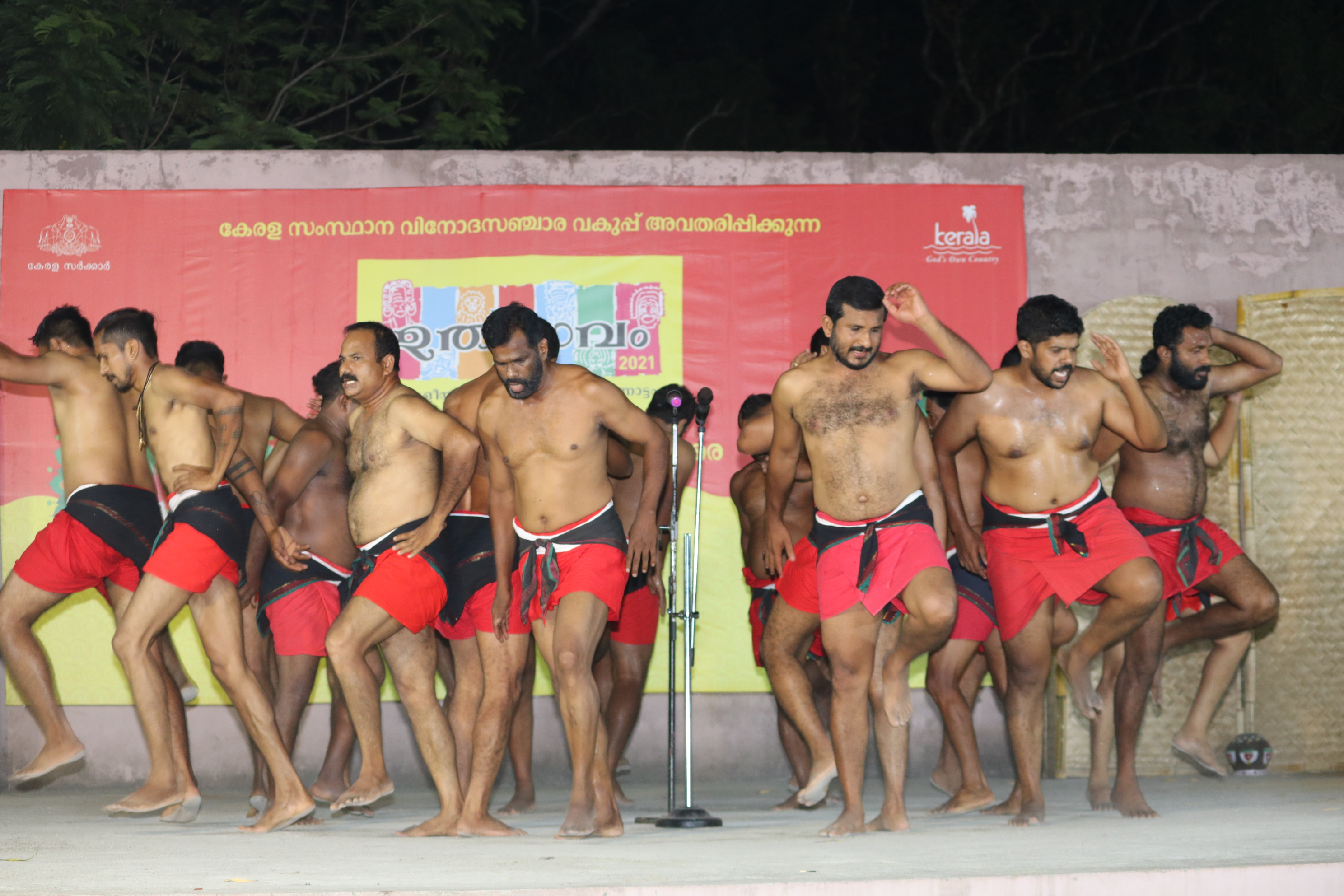
Poorakkali

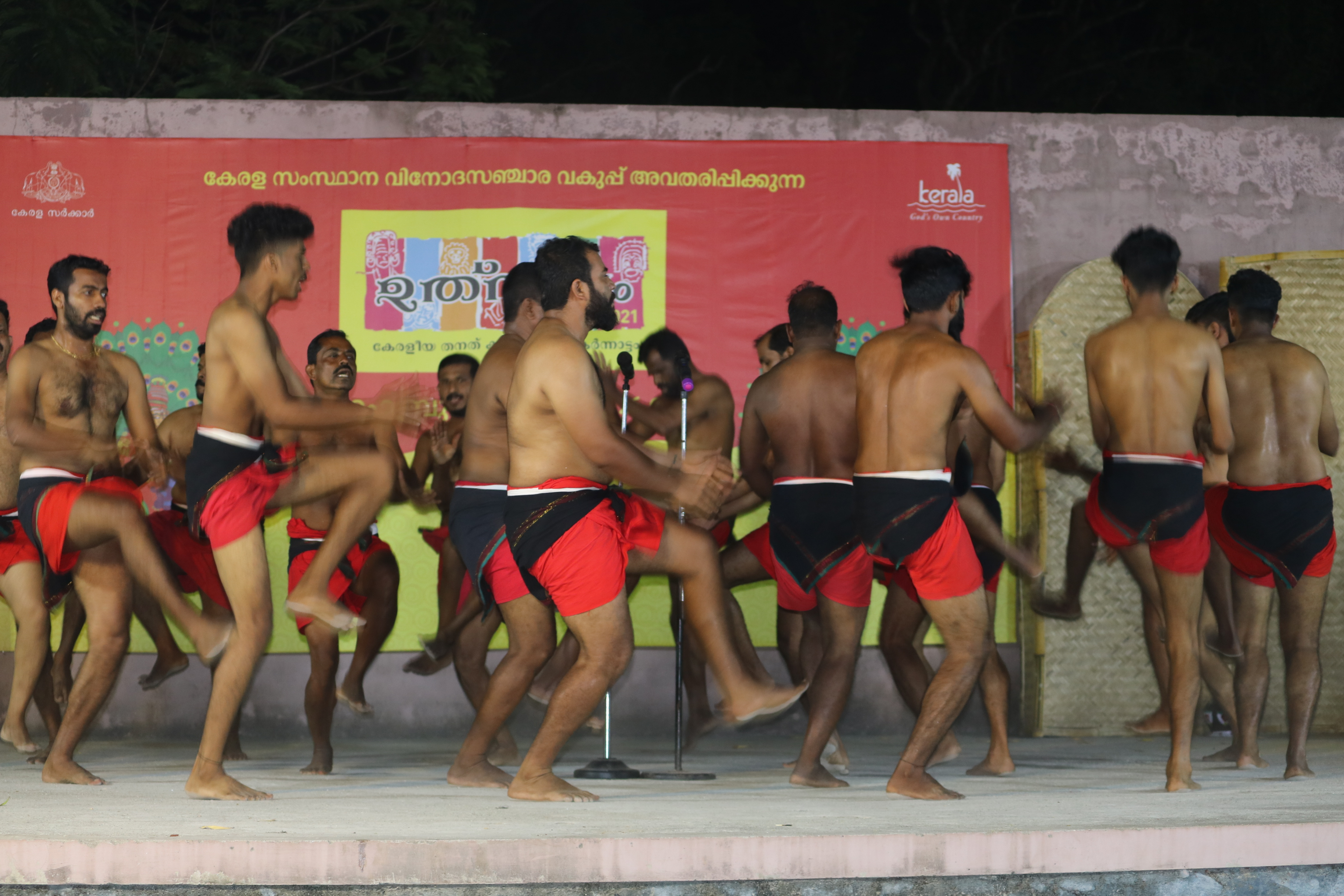
Poorakkali
