= Poothan and Thira =

Indian folk dance

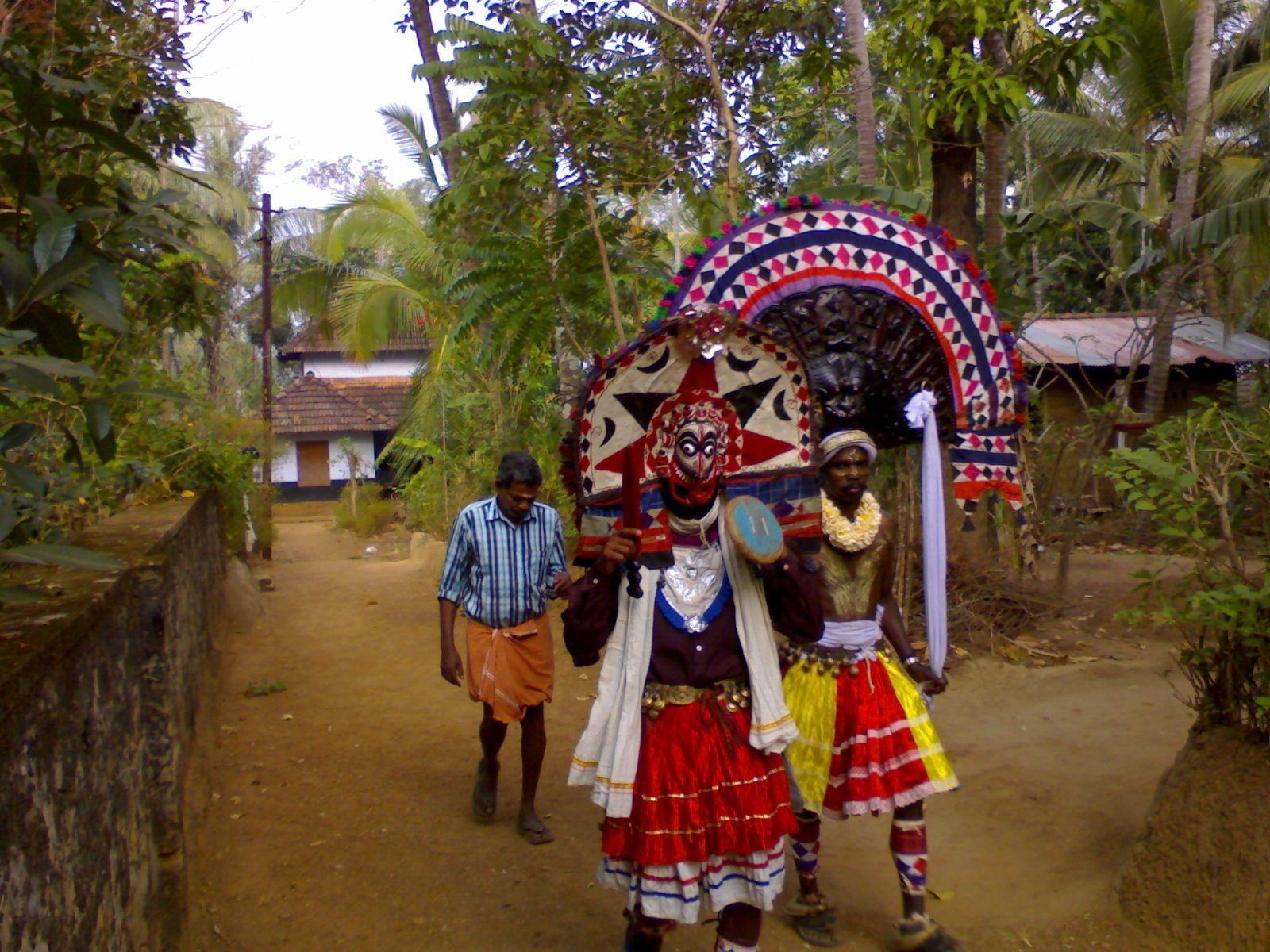
- Poothan and Thira for the Machattu Mamangam festival.
- Native name: പൂതനും തിറയും (Malayalam)
- Genre: Ritual
- Instrument(s): Thudi and Para
- Origin: Kerala, India

Poothan and Thira is a ritualistic folk art performed mainly in the Valluvanad region (present-day Palakkad district) of central Kerala in India, in which people dance in costumes representing Poothan is the lieutenant of Kali, and Thira, the goddess Kali, to the accompaniment of drummers. Thudi a small drum using for poothan, and heavy drum para accompanying thira.

== Overview ==
Poothan and Thira is a ritualistic folk art performed mainly in the Valluvanad region of central Kerala] in India. It is a traditional art performed by the Perumannan and Vannan communities on the occasion of Devi temple festivals.

It is usually performed once a year in villages in conjunction with the Kali temple festivals mainly in the coastal areas and River Nila- especially in the Pooram festival season between December and May, Thalappoli festival and Vela festival. In Valluvanad region, Poothan and Thira is performed in thousands of kavus.

== Myth ==
There are various myths are populat inconnection with Poothan and Thira. The story of Kannagi is popular in some regions.

It is believed that it was the Poothan that stood as a watchman to prevent the goldsmith from cheating while making the silambu for Kannagi. However, along with the golden silambu, he also made a brass silambu and hid it in the roadside ditch. On the way to handing over the silambu to Kannaki, the goldsmith skillfully replaces the gold silambu with the brass one which he had thrown into the stream by pretending to have tripped and fallen into the stream. He handed over the replaced silambu to Kannaki and returned with the rewards. Kannaki realized that she had been tricked when she picked up the silambu to wear it. The Pootham guarding the work bit his tongue and opened his eyes in anger. The ritual in which Pootham travel from house to house in search of the goldsmith who has committed fraud. Associated with this belief is the appearance of a Pootham with its eyes wide open and tongue out. There is another belief that Pootham goes from house to house in search of the real golden silambu.

Elsewhere popular is the myth related to killing of Darika. It is believed that Bhadrakali, the daughter of Shiva, after slaying Darika, danced in joy accompanied by the demons of Shiva. Thudi came as a percussion instrument because it was the dance of Lord Shiva's demons.

== Instruments used ==
Traditional small percussion instrument called Thudi is used for Poothan, while a heavy drum called Para is used for thira.

== Costume ==
The Mudi (headgear) of the Poothan is semi-circular. Mudi is also sometimes called 'thira'. The Mudi of the thira are made of thin wood. A face covering with the tongue sticking out is worn. Various types of dyes sare used for decorating Mudi. A lot traditional ornaments named as karivala (black bangle), kaivala (hand bangle), tholvala (wrist ornament), marthali (chest ornament) and aratali (waist ornament) are worn by the Poothan. There will be colorful dresses. Pootham's style of dress is similar to Kathakali. The eyes are smeared kohl, the face and body are painted with water mixed rice flour and turmeric and flower garlands are also worn.

== Ritual ==
There is a custom of going to houses dressed as Putham to inform the locals about the Thira festival at the temple. This ritual known as Kavettam or Kavil kayaral (entering the Kavu) is an important part of this ritual. After the performance in houses, rice, paddy and money will be given to the performers from the homes.

A typical Poothan and Thira performance includes shouts and wild gestures and may include percussion and horns as well as drums. The dancers wear large fan-shaped head-dresses and imposing masks, often with sticking-out tongues and bulging eyes. The dancer playing Poothan usually wears a bright coloured tightly woven costume, often including bright red elements and embellished with gold-coloured trinkets that rattle when the dancer moves. The dancer playing Thira wears a semicircular black crown with symbols of the goddess embossed on it.

== In popular culture ==
The epic Malayalam poem Poothappattu by Edasseri Govindan Nair is based on the Poothan and Thira tradition.
