= Slama Carol =

The Slama Carol or Slama Kali (literally "Play of peace") is a Syrian Christian traditional musical artform that originated in the coastal areas of Alappuzha and Cochin in Kerala, India.

== Etymology ==
Slama (Malayalam: ശ്‌ലാമ, Syriac: ܫܠܡ) means peace in Aramaic language. Kali (Malayalam: കളി) means a play or drama.

== Theme ==
The resurrection of Jesus is the central theme of this artform. It uses colourful costumes for Characters of such as Jesus, Apostles, Virgin Mary, etc. In this musical dance, happiness is the predominant emotion.
