= Darika =

Character in the Mudiyettu dance

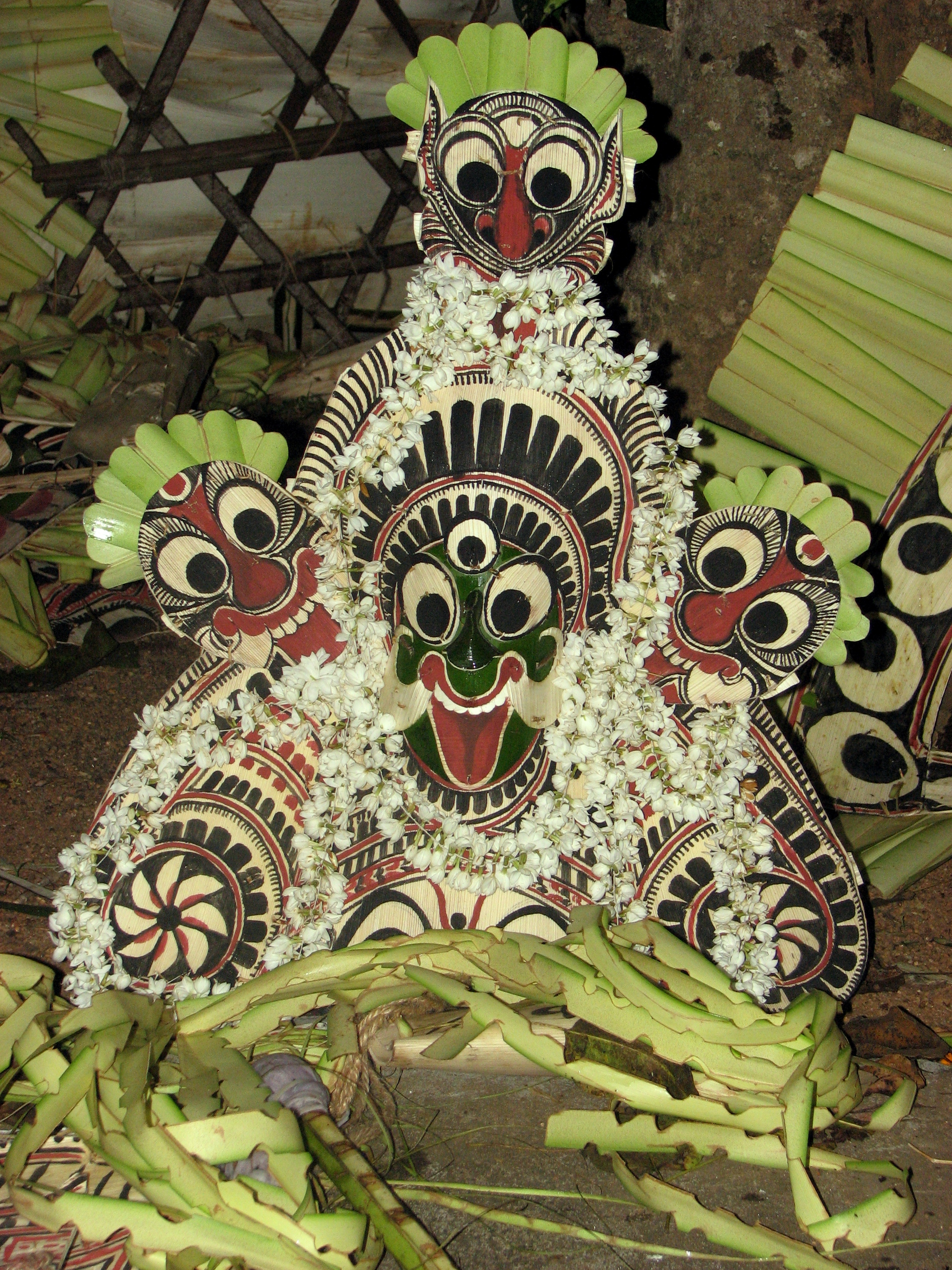
Darika kolam for Padayani

Darika is a character in Mudiyettu, a ritualistic dance from the Bhagavathi or Bhadrakali worship, usually performed only in the Kali temples of Kerala. The story is also known as "Darika vadham", or "killing of Darika".

In the story, Brahma granted immunity from death at the hands of any man to two of the fiercest Asuras, Darika and Danavendra, but with a curse that a woman would kill them. The two grew powerful and became a threat for the gods and godly men. After several attempts by the gods to defeat them, Lord Siva created Bhadrakali following the design given by Narada. All the Devas donated their special weapons, and Bhadrakali succeeded in destroying the demons after a fierce battle.

Recently a song in connection with this story "Pallivalu Bhadravatakam..." has become famous.
