= Kerala Folklore Academy =

Cultural affairs organisation in India

- Formation: 28 June 1995; 31 years ago
- Type: Cultural institution
- Headquarters: Chirakkal, Kannur, Kerala, India
- Chairman: O.S Unnikrishnan
- Secretary: A V Ajayakumar
- Parent organisation: Department of Cultural Affairs (Kerala)
- Website: keralafolklore.org

Kerala Folklore Academy is an autonomous center for cultural affairs constituted by the Government of Kerala and works under the Department of Cultural Affairs. It was established on 28 June 1995 to promote and project the traditional art forms of Kerala. It is located at Chirakkal, Kannur. The academy brings out a quarterly to promote the study and research in folklore, and has published more than 25 books on the folklore of Kerala. It also produced a book about 100 folk art forms of Kerala and two dictionaries, one on Chavittu Nadakam and another on Beary language.

== History ==
The institution was formed under the Travancore Cochin Literary, Scientific and Charitable Societies Registration act of 1955. It began functioning on 20 January 1996, to impart training in folk arts and to ensure ongoing efforts in their development, promotion and perpetuation. In 2003, the State Government handed over the waterside palace of the Chirakkal kings, at Chirakkal, to the academy to use as their headquarters. Former secretary of the academy, M. Pradeep Kumar says, "the academy, recently in its study and analysis, have identified various other folklore art forms which are a part of our rich cultural heritage. Brahmini Paattu, Chaatt Paattu, Chakra Paattu, Kadal Vanchi Paattu and the tribal songs are the recent additions to the folklore art. There are different types of tribal and traditional songs. The tribal songs of each ‘Ooru’ (a tribal colony) are different. There are nearly 1000 folk art forms existing in Kerala, which have been passed on from generation to generation."

== Awards ==
The academy awards prizes and fellowships to notable artistes and experts in the field of folklore. The fellowships comprise ₹15000 each and citation. The folklore awards and book award carries ₹7500 and citation. The Gurupooja and Yuvaprathibha award winners will get ₹5000 each and citation.

P. K. Kalan Award

P. K. Kalan award was instituted in 2008, in the name of former academy chairman, Gaddika artist and social activist P. K. Kalan. It is awarded for contributions to the field of folk art forms. It comprises a cash prize of ₹100,000, a certificate and a statuette.

Year	Recipient	Awarded for	Ref(s)
2009	Kanna Peruvannan	Outstanding contributions to Theyyam art form	
2009	M. V. Vishnu Namboothiri	Contributions to folklore study and research	
2014	C. K. Aandi	Outstanding contributions to Theyyam art form	
2015	N. Ajith Kumar	Contributions to language, literature, folk arts, cinema and other art forms.	
