= Neyyattinkara taluk =

Neyyattinkara Taluk
- Taluk
- Location in Kerala, India Neyyattinkara Taluk (India)
- Coordinates: 8.4°N 77.08°E
- Country: India
- State: Kerala
- District: Thiruvananthapuram
- Revenue Division: Thiruvananthapuram
- Founder: Marthanda Varma
- Named for: Neyyar
- Headquarters: Neyyattinkara

Area
  - Total: 570.91 km^{2} (220.43 sq mi)

Population (2011)
  - Total: 880,986
  - Density: 1,543.1/km^{2} (3,996.7/sq mi)

Languages
  - Official: Malayalam, English
- Time zone: UTC+5:30 (IST)
- Vehicle registration: KL-20, KL-19

Neyyattinkara is a Taluk (tehsil) located in the southern region of Thiruvananthapuram district, in the Indian state of Kerala. This taluk encompasses a total of 21 villages and one municipality, making it the southernmost taluk in the state. Notably, the Vizhinjam International Seaport Thiruvananthapuram is situated within Neyyattinkara Taluk.In the Vizhinjam International Seaport Thiruvananthapuram, the port international code IN NYY 1, the "NYY" represents Neyyattinkara

== Settlements ==
There are 21 villages and one Municipality in the taluk.

== Villages ==
Anavoor, Athiyannur, Balaramapuram, Chenkal, Kanjiramkulam, Karode, Karumkulam, Kollayil, Kottukal, Kulathoor, Kunnathukal, Neyyattinkara, Pallichal, Parassala, Parasuvaikkal, Perumkadavila, Perumpazhuthoor, Poovar, Thirupuram, Vellarada, Vizhinjam.

=== Municipalities ===
There is only one municipality, Neyyattinkara, which is also the headquarters of the taluk.
