= Neyyattinkara (disambiguation) =

Neyyattinkara is a town located in south of capital city Trivandrum of Kerala, India. It may also refer to:

- Neyyattinkara (tehsil), a Taluk in Kerala
- Neyyattinkara (State Assembly constituency), a constituency in Kerala
- Neyyattinkara Sree Krishna Swami Temple, A famous temple situated in neyyattinkara
- Neyyattinkara Vasudevan, a Carnatic music vocalist from neyyattinkara
- Neyyattinkara railway station, a major railway station in Kerala
