= Education in Neyyattinkara =

Neyyattinkara has a number of secondary and higher secondary educational institutions, along with a number of Polytechnics and Engineering Colleges in its vicinity. The Govt. HSS in the town is one of the oldest schools in the state, established in the 1890s.

== List of colleges ==
1. NIMS Dental College, Aralumoodu, Neyyattinkara
2. Technology Management Corridor (TMC), Near Sub-jail, Chemparathivila, NTA [Institute of Human Resource Development (IHRD), Government of Kerala]
3. College of Applied Science, Dhanuvachapuram (5 km from Town) (Institute of Human Resource Development (IHRD), Government of Kerala)
4. Ezhuthachan College of Pharmaceutical Sciences, Marayamuttom
5. VTM NSS college, Dhanuvachapuram (5 km from Town)
6. K N M Government Arts & Science College, Kanjiramkulam (5 km from Town)
7. Government Arts & Science College, Kulathoor
8. University Institute of Technology, Neyyattinkara Centre (2 km from Town)
9. Government Polytechnic College, Perumpazhuthoor (3 km from Town)
10. Regional Institute of Aviation, Pravachambalam (6 km from Town)
11. CSI College of Education, Parasala
12. PRS College of Engineering and Technology, Paliyode
13. Christian College, Kattakada (7 km from Neyyattinkara town border, however, this college comes under newly formed Kattakada Taluk)
14. Sree Krishna College of Pharmacy & Research Centre, Parassala

== List of schools ==
St.Teresa Of Avila ICSE School
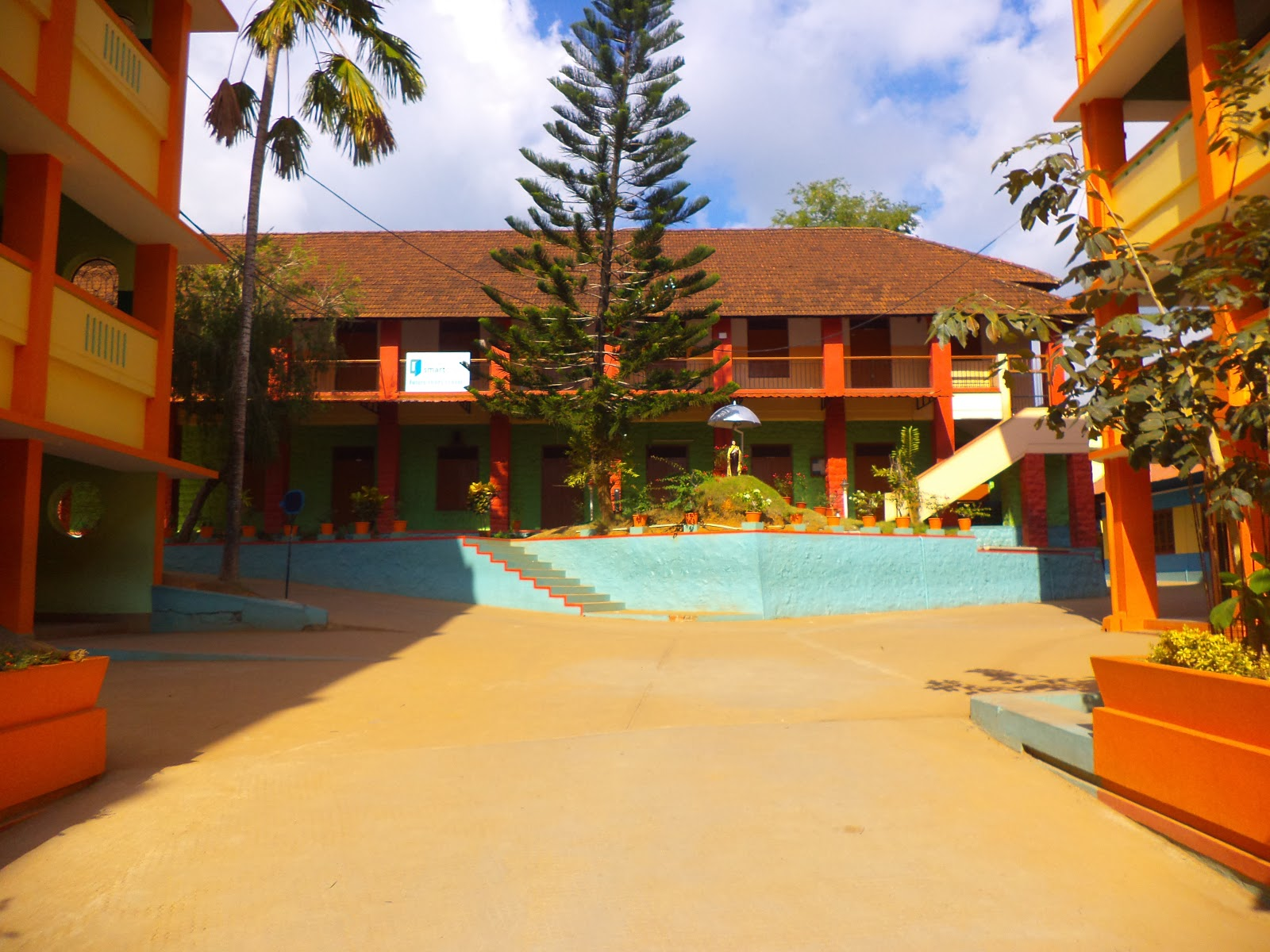
- Affiliated to CISCE No. KE148
- Convent Road, Neyyattinkara

Information
- Type: Private
- Motto: Let Your Light Shine
- Established: July 1928
- School district: Trivandrum
- Principal: Sr. SHYLA ABEL
- Faculty: 121
- Grades: K - 10
- Enrollment: 1500-1700
- Campus size: 6 acres
- Campus type: Privately owned and operated
- Mascot: Lotus with Lamp

1. St.Teresa's Convent GHSS, Convent Road, Neyyattinkara: Classes from Kindergarten to Plus Two. Students can opt either ICSE (Indian Certificate of Secondary Education) Syllabus in English Medium or State Syllabus in English / Malayalam Medium. Boys are also admitted up to 7th standard in State Syllabus. This school was established in the year 1928. English medium school started in 1931. Higher secondary section added in 2002. I.C.S.E. wing started in 2007. 2013 batch Indian Administrative Service (IAS) first rank holder in India, Ms. Haritha V Kumar is the former student of this school.
2. Government Higher Secondary School, Near Govt. Hospital Jn (State Syllabus - English / Malayalam Medium)
3. Government Girls' Higher Secondary School, Govt. Hospital Road (State Syllabus - English / Malayalam Medium)
4. Sree Vidyadhiraja Vidya Nilayam Higher Secondary School, Convent Road (English Medium)
5. Viswabharathy Public School, Kanyakumari Road (CBSE Syllabus, English Medium)
6. Junior Basic School (JBS), Neyyattinkara - State Syllabus, Malayalam Medium (Near Municipality & Fire Station buildings)
7. St. Philip English Medium High School, T B Junction
8. LMS HSS Amaravila, Near Amaravila Church
9. Dr. G.R Public School, Ooruttukaala
10. St. Mary’s H.S., Kamukincode
11. Government High School, Perumpazhuthoor- 3 km from Town
12. M.V Higher Secondary School, Arumanoor
13. Government Higher Secondary School - Marayamuttom in Perumkadavila Panchayat
14. Leo XIII Higher Secondary School, Pulluvila
15. New Higher Secondary School, Nellimoodu
16. St. Chrysostom's G.H.S.S Nellimoodu
17. PKS Higher Secondary School, Kanjiramkulam
18. Government High School, Kanjiramkulam
19. Javahar Central School, Kanjiramkulam
20. Government High School, Anavoor
21. Government Higher Secondary School, Keezharoor
22. St. Helen's Girls' Higher Secondary School, Lourdupuram
23. Srisankara Centralschool, Poozhikunnu, Venkadampu
