= Dhanuvachapuram =

- village
- Location within Kerala Location within India
- Coordinates: 8.3839°N 77.1284°E
- Country: India
- State: Kerala
- District: Thiruvananthapuram

Government
  - Body: Grama Panchayath

Languages
  - Official: Malayalam, English
- Time zone: UTC+5:30 (IST)
- PIN: 695503

Dhanuvachapuram is a village in Thiruvananthapuram district in the state of Kerala, India. It is located at a height of about 100 meters from sea level. Dhanuvachapuram is also known the education center of Neyyattinkara because there are lot of colleges and schools situated here.

== Locality ==
- Poovar beach – 7 km away
- Kovalam beach – 15 km away
- Neyyar Dam – 30 km away

== Education ==
- VTM NSS College, Dhanuvachapuram
- College of Applied Science, Dhanuvachapuram
- Govt.ITI Dhanuvachapuram
- Government girls school, Dhanuvachapuram
- NKM Govt. Higher Secondary School

== Railway station ==
- Dhanuvachapuram Railway station

== See also ==
- Neyyattinkara
- Parassala
- Amaravila
- vellarada
