= Vellarada =

- village
- Location in Kerala, India Vellarada (India)
- Coordinates: 8.4461°N 77.19711°E
- Country: India
- State: Kerala
- District: Thiruvananthapuram

Government
  - Body: Grama Panchayath

Population (2011)
  - Total: 28,667

Languages
  - Official: Malayalam, English
- Time zone: UTC+5:30 (IST)
- PIN: 695505
- Vehicle registration: KL-19

Vellarada is a border village situated in Thiruvananthapuram district in the state of Kerala, India. It is 42 km from Thiruvananthapuram. It is the southernmost part of Kerala state, sharing its border with Tamil Nadu. Vellarada is said to be the threshold to the high-range areas of the eastern part of Thiruvananthapuram district. The southernmost point of Western Ghats in Kerala is near Vellarada.

Vellarada is also known for its hilltop shrine "Kurisumala Pilgrim Centre" (also called Thekkan kurisumala) at an elevation of 640 metres (2,100 ft). Thousands of devotees from various parts of Tamil Nadu, Kerala, Andhra Pradesh and Karnataka visit the shrine during Lent every year.

== Demographics ==
As of 2011 India census, A total of 7,575 families resides in Vellarada. Vellarada village had a population of 28,667 with 13,923 males and 14,744 females. There is a positive sex ratio of 1,059 existing in Vellarada. Literacy is at 92.29%. The dominant religions in Vellarada are Hinduism and Christianity. The Scheduled Caste (SC) constitutes 7.02% while Schedule Tribe (ST) was 1.22% of the total population in Vellarada village.

Majority of the population practice agriculture, chiefly cash crops like rubber.

== Administration ==
- From local self-government perspective, in the three-tier Panchayati Raj local self-government model, Vellarada Grama Panchayat falls in the Perumkadavila Block Panchayat of Thiruvananthapuram Jilla PanchayatPanchayath. The Vellarada Grama Panchayat, in turn, has 23 wards which are the smallest administrative unit.
- In the political map of the country, Vellarada falls into Parassala Legislative assembly constituency of Kerala state and Thiruvananthapuram (Lok Sabha constituency) of parliament of India.
- In revenue administration point of view Vellarada Village falls into Neyyattinkara taluk of Thiruvananthapuram district.
- In Law and Order perspective, Vellarada falls under Kerala Police's Thiruvananthapuram Rural police district. The station serves neighbouring villages of Kunnathukal and Amboori also.
- In terms of registration, Vellarada has a Sub Registrar Office, that is under Department of Registration, Government of Kerala. However, Vellarada SRO doesn't have an independent vehicle registration code Parassala (KL -19).

== Transportation ==
In the case of transportation Vellarada doesn't have direct rail connectivity or waterways connectivity. Roadways are the main and only mode of transportation.

=== Roadways ===
The major roads passing through Vellarada are:

- The Hill Highway from Parassala to Nandarapadavu in Kasaragod
- The State Highway 3 (Kerala), i.e. the Nedumangad–Aralvaimozhi road made by Travancore kings that passes through Anappara in Vellarada
- The Karamana–Vellarada Road

Public transport through road is entirely managed by KSRTC and TNSTC.

- Kerala State Road Transport Corporation (KSRTC) connects Vellarada directly with district headquarters Thiruvananthapuram, Neyyattinkara, Parassala, Kattakada, Nedumangad and distant towns such as Kottayam, Erattupetta, Kottarakkara, Pathanamthitta, Ranni, Erumeli, Thodupuzha, Muvattupuzha Chengannur, Thiruvalla, Thrissur, Kumily and Kumbum . There are no private buses operating through Vellarada.
- Tamil Nadu State Transport Corporation (TNSTC) has only a very few services through Vellarada. TNSTC connects Vellarada directly with Kanyakumari, Thuckalay, Nagercoil, Thirunelveli, Madurai most of them connect to either Parassala or Marthandam. TNSTC is available in abundance from a nearby place called Panachamoodu which is a town that's partially in Kerala and partially in Tamil Nadu.

=== Railways ===
The nearest railway stations from Vellarada are:

- Parassala railway station - 13 km
- Dhanuvachapuram railway station - 15 km
- Neyyattinkara railway station - 17 km
- Thiruvananthapuram Central railway station - 37 km
- Eraniel railway station - 37 km

=== Airways ===
The nearest airports are:

- Trivandrum International Airport - 40 km
- Tuticorin Airport - 151 km
- Cochin International Airport - 260 km

== Tourist attractions ==
- Kali Mala
- Thekkan Kurissumala
- Chittar Dam and reservoir (in Tamil Nadu)
- Neyyar Wild Life Sanctuary
- Kottur Elephant Rehabilitation Center
- Mayam Kadavu, Amboori

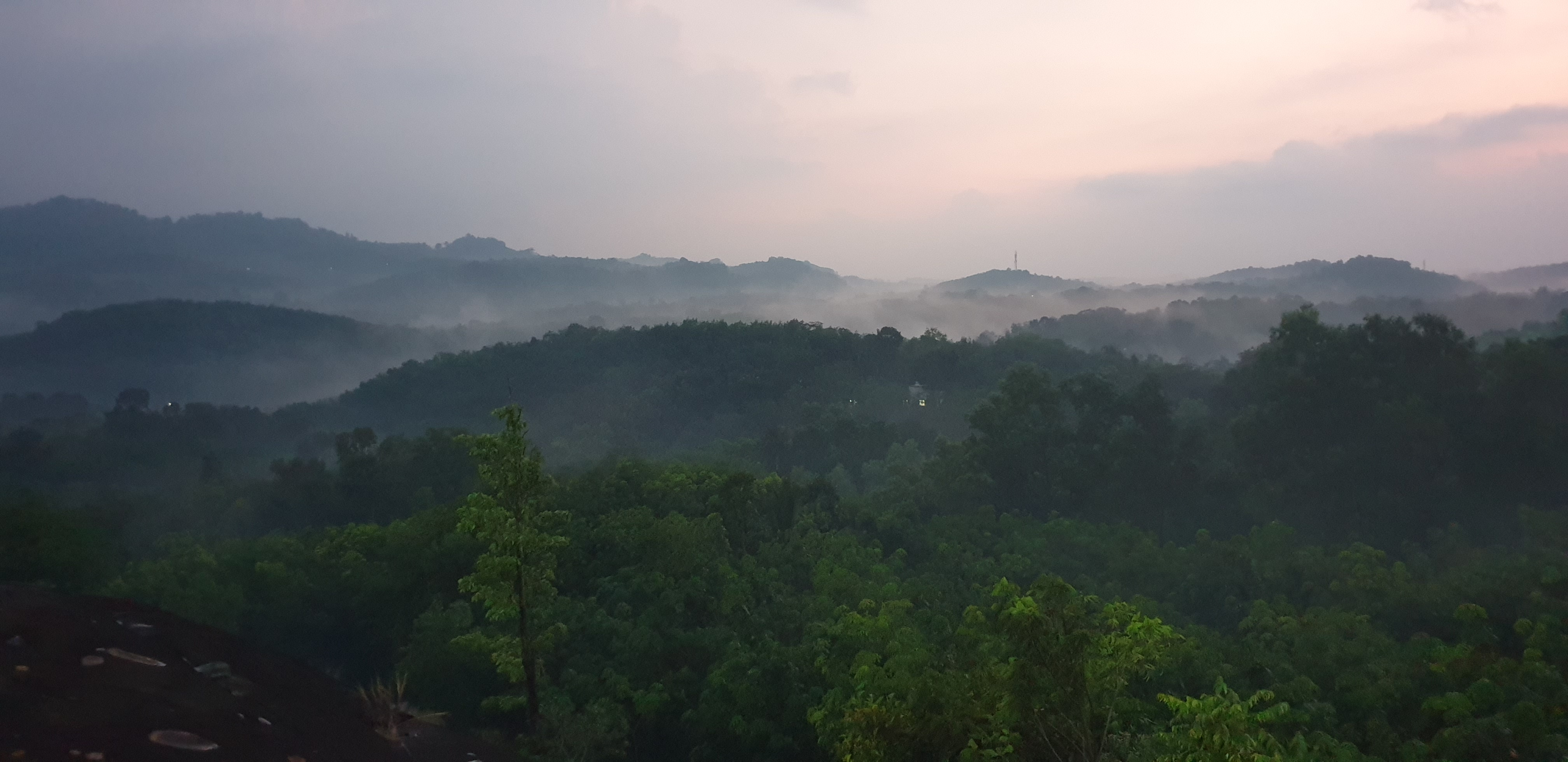
Thekkan Kurisumala skyline

== Health care ==
- Perumkadavila Block Panchayath Vellarada Community Health Centre
- RUCKMONI MEMORIAL DEVI HOSPITAL, VELLARADA
- CSI Medical College Karakonam

== Educational institutions ==
- Velayudha panikkar memorial higher secondary school vellarada
- Seventh Day School
- Govt Ups Vellarada
- Easwara Vilasam Up School Koothali
- Govt Lps School Koothali
- Lms Lps Anchumaramkala
- LMS LPS Manoor, Pattamthalakkal

== Higher education institutes ==
- CSI Medical College, Karakonam
- PRS College of Nursing, Paliyodu - Vellarada
- UIT Arattukuzhi - Vellarada
- White Memorial Arts & Science College, Panachamoodu - Vellarada.
- RUCKMONI COLLEGE OF NURSING, VELLARADA

== Religious ==
- Thekkan Kurisumala pilgrim center
- Lokanatha Kshethram Vellarada
- St pius church Kurisumala
- Kalimala
- Choondical Sree Bhadrakali Devi Temple
- Kaliyikkal Sree Bhadrakaali Temple
- Pachayam Sree Dharma shastha Temple
- Chirathalakkal Sree Bhagavathy Temple
- C S I vellarada (district & Area Church)
- C S I Muttachal
- C S I Churuli
- C S I Manali
- vencodu Sree Dharmasastha Temple
- Soul Winning Church of India (SWCI), Karamoodu
- New Life Bethel Church, Muttachal
- Suvartha Prayer Hall, Panayadu
