= Mosa Walsalam Sastriyar =

Indian musician

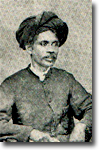
- Born: Moses Anthony Nadar; 1847; Thirupuram, near Neyyattinkara in erstwhile Travancore
- Died: February 20, 1916
- Monuments: Mosa Walsalam Sastriyar Memorial, CSI Church Thirupuram
- Occupation: writer of hymns
- Era: British India
- Spouse: Rahel (m. 1868)
- Father: Anthony aka Arulanandam

Moses Anthony Nadar, popularly known as Mosa Valsalam Sastriyar (1847 - 20 February 1916), was an Indian writer of Christian hymns.

He was born into a Nadar (caste) Christian family in Thirupuram near Thiruvananthapuram.
