= Kottamom =

Village in Neyyattinkara Taluk, Kerala, India

Coordinates: 8.373°N 77.134°E

Kottamom is a village in the Neyyattinkara Taluk which is part of the Thiruvananthapuram district of Kerala, a state in India Kottamom comes under Chenkal Panchayat and comes under the South Kerala Division. Kottamom is located 4 km from Parassala, 5.5 km from Neyyattinkara, and 30 km from Thiruvananthapuram. This village has a post office, and comes under the Thiruvananthapuram pin code - 695122.

Udiyankulangara, Neyyattinkara, and Parassala are the nearest places to Kottamom. Dhanuvachapuram, the nearest railway station is within walkable distance. Malayalam is the local language of Kottamom. Government service, building, and agriculture are the main occupations of the people. A large proportion of the population are expatriates.

== Education ==
Prominent educational institutions near Kottamom are VTM NSS college, Dhanuvachapuram, Government Lakshmi Vilasam Higher Secondary School, and Fathima Public School.

== Politics ==
Kottamom is part of the Trivandrum Lok Sabha constituency. Kottamom ward comes under chenkal panchayath. The Ward member is Mrs. Sheela of the Left Democratic Front.

== Industry ==
The major factory near Kottamom is KELPALM, Kerala State Palmyrah Products Development Welfare Corporation Ltd, and KELPALM Facility Centre. Kottamom is also bounded by a Maruthi Suzuki Limited car show room, a TVS three-wheeler showroom, a clay factory, and a paver tiles factory.

== Transport ==
Kottamom is well connected to the capital city of Thiruvananthapuram, 26 km away, through regular bus services operated by Kerala State Road Transport Corporation. Dhanuvachapuram Railway station is located on the Mangalore-Trivandrum-Kanyakumari Railway line which is walkable distance away from Kottamom Junction.

== Auditoriums ==
Kairali (air-conditioned) and Sree are the major auditoriums in Kottamom.
