= Venpakal =

- village
- Location in Kerala, India Venpakal (India)
- Coordinates: 8°23′02″N 77°03′59″E
- Country: India
- State: Kerala
- District: Thiruvananthapuram
- Talukas: Neyyattinkara

Government
  - Body: Athiyannur, Thiruvananthapuram Gram panchayat

Languages
  - Official: Malayalam, English
- Time zone: UTC+5:30 (IST)
- PIN: 695123
- Telephone code: 91(0)471
- Vehicle registration: KL-20
- Lok Sabha constituency: Thiruvananthapuram
- Vidhan Sabha constituency: Neyyattinkara
- Civic agency: Athiyannur, ThiruvananthapuramGrama Panchayat
- Climate: Tropical (Köppen)

Venpakal is a village in Thiruvananthapuram district in the state of Kerala, India.

== Location ==
Venpakal is about 5 km away from the town of Neyyattinkara on the Kamukinkode-Nellimoodu road.

== Politics ==
Venpakal village is part of Athiyannur, Thiruvananthapuram Grama Panchayath. It comes under Neyyattinkara Assembly constituency and Thiruvananthapuram (Lok Sabha constituency).

== List of Hospitals ==
Government Community Health Centre, Venpakal

== Educational Institutions ==
Government LPBS, Venpakal

Government LPGS, Venpakal

== Transport ==
By Rail

Venpakal is about 20 km from Thiruvananthapuram Central Railway Station and 6 km from the Neyyattinkara Railway Station.

By Bus

Buses from KSRTC Central Bus Station Thiruvananthapuram and Neyyattinkara Bus depot operate to Venpakal.

By Air

The nearest airport is Trivandrum International Airport, 25 km away.
