= Panachamoodu =

- Village
- Location within Kerala
- Coordinates: 8.40166°N 77.0871079°E
- Country: India
- State: Kerala
- District: Thiruvananthapuram

Government
  - Body: Grama Panchayat

Languages
  - Official: Malayalam, English
- Time zone: UTC+5:30 (IST)
- PIN: 695505

Panachamoodu is a village in Neyyattinkara Taluk in Trivandrum district, Kerala State, India. and also sharing its border with Tamil Nadu.

== See also ==
- Neyyattinkara
- Parassala
- Amaravila
- Vellarada
