= History and culture of Neyyattinkara =

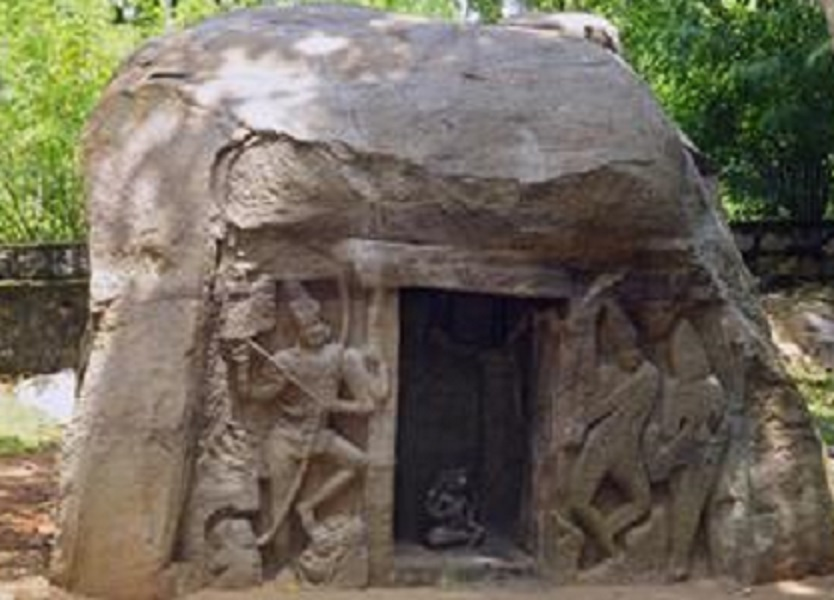
Unfinished Cave Temple in Vizhinjam [South-West side of NTA Town, constructed by the rulers of the Ay kingdom (857-885 AD)]

Cave pictures, probably by Neolithic people, are found in Pandavanpara, located in the North east side of Neyyattinkara towards Karakonam route. This famous cave will come under Perumkadavila panchayath. The name of this portion of land, before Marthanda Varma became the ruler of Travancore, was 'Thenganad'.

The megaliths recently unearthed at Vizhinjam shows a splendorous display of craftsmanship that was prevalent in the region from the Middle Eras. Studies are going on to ascertain the ancient history of this region. Some of the historic relics of NTA are:

1. Pandavan Para (believed to be having 5,000-year-old human inscriptions)
2. Vizhinjam Cave Temple (constructed by the rulers of the Ay kingdom)
3. Anantha Victoria Marthandan Canal (constructed during the British rule)
4. Neyyattinkara's first library Njanapradayini

== Times of Travancore Dynasty ==
Sreekrishna Swami Temple, Neyyattinkara Town founded by Marthanda Varma in 1775

Sree Krishna Swami Temple in the town-centre stands as a rare example of merger between legend and reality. According to the legend it was here the Travancore king Marthanda Varma once hid inside the hollow trunk of a Jackfruit tree to escape from his enemies during his war against the Ettuveetil Pillamar (The Nair-Feudal Lords of the Eight Houses). The King prayed to Lord Krishna for helping him as he was being surrounded by the enemies. At that time, a mysterious child asked the King to hide himself inside the hollow trunk of a large jack tree standing there. The jack tree popularly known as 'Ammachiplavu' (Translating to "Grandmother Jackfruit Tree") since then, could still be seen preserved in the Shri Krishna Swamy Temple located in the heart of the town. This temple was built by Marthanda Varma in the year 1755, as a thanksgiving to the Lord Krishna, who helped him to win the ordeal.

== Independence struggle ==
Neyyattinkara is the birthplace of renowned revolutionaries like Swadeshabhimani Ramakrishna Pillai, Athazhamangalam VeeraRaghavan who fought for Indian independence and against the dictatorial rule of Travancore Diwans. Neyyattinkara is the land of many uprisings against British rule in India. The brutal crackdown by British military resulted in death of many freedom fighters including Veeraraghavan. A monument reminding the new generations of these struggles could be seen in the heart of the town, in front of the Town Police Station. The Father of Nation of India, Mahatma Gandhi, had spent a day at Madhavi Mandiram (name of a house) in Neyyattinkara.

== Wards in Neyyattinkara Municipal Area ==
Neyyattinkara Municipal Area is divided into 44 wards. The respective ward numbers assigned by the Municipality are given in brackets. For official matters ward numbers are generally mentioned in Roman numerals. The wards are: (1). Aralummoodu, (2) Puthanambalam, (3) Moonnukallinmoodu, (4) Koottappana, (5) Pallivilakam, (6) Punnakkadu, (7) Kalathuvila, (8) Vadakodu, (9) Muttakkadu, (10) Elavanikkara, (11) Mampazhakkara, (12) Mullaravila, (13) Perumpazhuthoor, (14) Alampotta, (15) Plavila, (16) Thozhukkal, (17) Vazhuthoor (includes Christ Nagar, Mythry Nagar and Keerthi Nagar), (18) Kollavamvila, (19) Thavaravila, (20) kulathamal, (21) Chaikottukonam, (22) Maruthathoor, (23) Irumbil (includes Arakkunnu and Stuart Nagar), (24) Fort (includes Vadakkey-kotta & Police Quarters), (25) Vlangamuri, (26) Krishnapuram, (27) Rameswaram, (28) Narayanapuram, (29) Amaravila, (30) Pullamala, (31) Pirayummoodu, (32) Olathanni, (33) Chundavila, (34) Athazhamangalam, (35) Kavalakulam, (36) Panagattukari, (37) Nilamel, (38) Manaloor, (39) Ooruttukala, (40) Alummoodu, (41) Town, (42) Brahmamkodu, (43) Athiyannoor, (44) Vazhimukku

These 44 wards are under the surveillance of Neyyattinkara Municipality (a local self-government or LSG). In each ward there is a Ward Councillor democratically elected for a period of 5 years. These Councillors represent the people in the ward concerned. In most of the wards there are Kudumbasree units of Kudumbashree Mission (Kerala) initiated for the development of womenfolk especially unemployed housewives.

=== Community-building organizations in Municipal Area ===
In most of the wards in Neyyattinkara Municipal Area there are Residents' associations registered under "The Travancore-Cochin Literary, Scientific and Charitable Societies Registration Act, 1955" working for the welfare of the public. A few residents' associations in the Municipal Area were joined together and formed Federation of Residents' Associations, Neyyattinkara (FRAN) to move as a social unit so as to get all the welfare measures from the Local Self Government (viz. Municipality) and the State Government. Major Residents’ Associations in Municipal Area are:

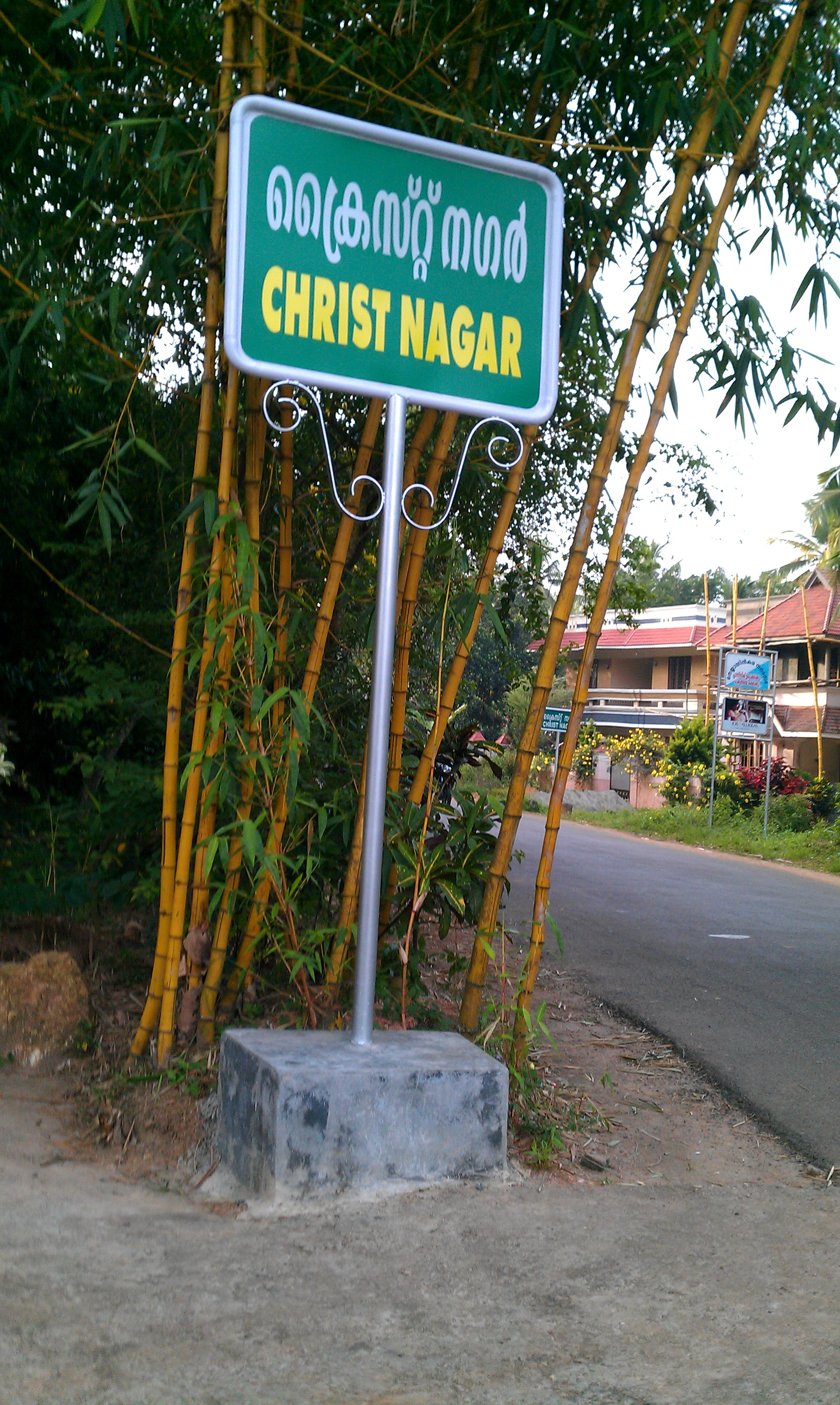
Christ Nagar in NTA Town (CSI Town Church, Neyyattinkara area)

Christ Nagar Residents' Association (CNRA), Christ Nagar, Neyyattinkara
- President: Sherin George (Indian National Congress), Maniyal, Christ Nagar. Elected on 2014-04-09
- Secretary: Mr. Ajithkumar C(Indian National Congress), Mispa, Christ Nagar. Elected on 2014-04-09
- Founded: 2000 (Reconstituted in 2014)
- Headquarters: Christ Nagar; Railway Overbridge Road; Neyyattinkara

1. Christ Nagar Residents’ Association (CNRA), Christ Nagar The Christ Nagar Residents’ Association (CNRA) is a non-profit society in the Christ Nagar Residential Area of Neyyattinkara town. The association was founded in 2000 by the residents of Christ Nagar and membership is restricted to those who live within the neighbourhood. The association's original aims are outlined in its memorandum of association. The association has close ties with the Indian National Congress party, with many CNRA members having worked for the party. Christ Nagar Residential Area contains major landmarks such as Town Church (BFM)-NTA, CSI Town Church-NTA, Arakkunnu Checkpost and Prayer Gardens (Ministry of Jesus)-NTA in Vazhuthoor Ward; Bathel Church (Arakkunnu), and extends to Irumbil Ward. Christ Nagar is the largest commuter town or bedroom suburb of Neyyattinkara town. In God We Trust is the tagline of CNRA.
2. Mythry Nagar Residents’ Association (MNRA), Mythry Nagar [in Vazhuthoor Ward]
3. Vazhuthoor Residents’ Association (VRA), Vazhuthoor [in Vazhuthoor Ward]
4. Koottapana Residents’ Association (KRA), Koottapana
5. Swaruma Residents’ Association (SRA), Pallivilakom/Vadakodu
6. Kanichankode Residents’ Association (KRA), Kanichankodu (Govt. Hospital to Railway Station road)
7. Swadeshi Residents’ Association (SRA), Kanichankodu
8. Vadakkey Kotta Residents’ Association (VKRA), Vadakkey Kotta (Sreekrishana Swami Temple to Police Quarters road including Kandal and Kondodi area)
9. Convent Road Residents’ Association (CRRA), Convent Road (Alummoodu)
10. Nilamel Residents’ Association (NRA), Nilamel
11. Krishna Nagar Residents’ Association (KNRA), Krishna Nagar (West side of Swadeshabhimani Municipal Park, Neyyattinkara)
12. Amman Nagar Residents’ Association (ANRA), Amman Koil, near Neyyattinkara Bus-stand
13. Oruma Residents’ Association (ORA), Pathankallu
14. Palakadavu Residents’ Association (PKRA), Palakadavu
15. Viswabharathy Road Residents’ Association (VRRA), Viswabharathy Road
16. Neyyattinkara Town Residents' Association (NTRA), NTA Town (Town Hall side)
17. Swadeshabhimani Residents' Association (SRA), NTA Town (South of Sreekrishna Swami Temple, Court and Kannipuram area)
18. Gandhi Nagar Residents’ Association (GNRA), South of NTA KSRTC Bus Terminal
19. Mahatma Residents’ Association (MRA), West of NTA KSRTC Bus Terminal

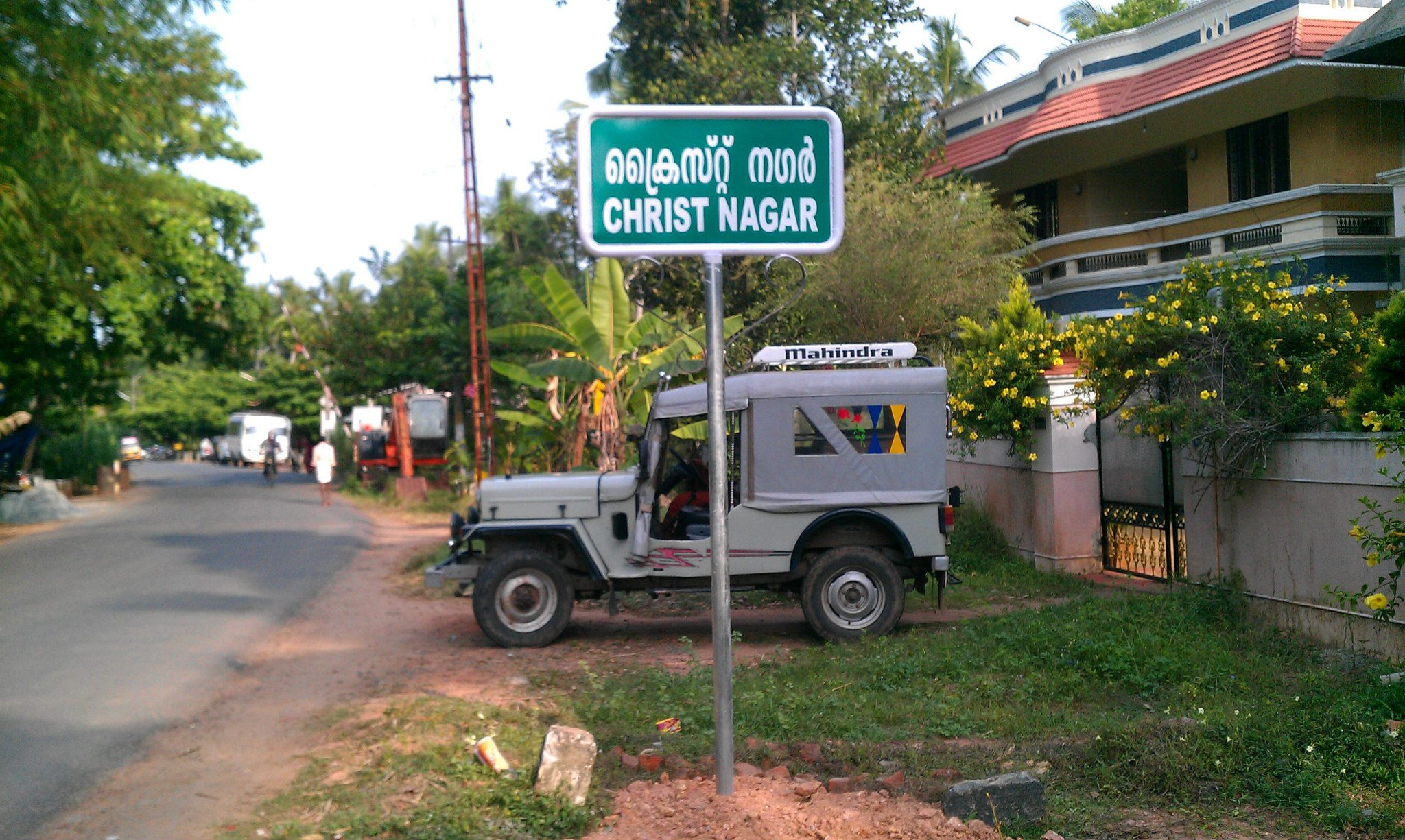
Christ Nagar Residential Area in Neyyattinkara Town (Arakkunnu Checkpost - Vazhuthoor Ward)

In April 2010, Vazhuthoor Ward set as a model in food security through the Swabhimanam Self-Sufficiency programme spearheaded by Adv. Vinod Sen (Indian National Congress party), the then ward Councillor of Vazhuthoor Ward. As an incentive in appreciation for the efforts put in by the local bodies in taking government's health care projects to the grassroots, Neyyattinkara Municipality got Arogyakeralam award 2012–13. Now Adv. L. S Sheela (Indian National Congress party), who is the vice-chairperson and finance and standing committee chairperson of Neyyattinkara Municipality is the ward councilor of Christ Nagar, Mythry Nagar, Keerthi Nagar, New Street and Vazhuthoor residential areas that come under Vazhuthoor Ward.

== Christian Fellowship Christmas Parade, 2015 ==
From the heart of NTA town, the L-shaped parade route travelled [on Christmas Day (2015-12-25) at 4 p.m] south of the town (Viswabharathy road) to west of the town (T B Junction) and gathered in the east of the town: Govt. Boys’ Higher Secondary School, NTA for United Christmas Celebrations, 2015 (Convention). The parade and convention were organized by The Christian Fellowship, NTA: a united Christian body comprising Latin Catholic Diocese of NTA, 65 CSI Churches in NTA town, Malankara Mar Thoma Syrian Church, Malankara Christian Church, Lutheran, and Evangelical Church of India. A number of CSI Churches including CSI Muttakkad, CSI Melariyodu, CSI Kurumbal, St. Paul's CSI( Pottayil, Irumbil), Lali Memorial CSI – Punnakkadu, CSI Irumbil, CSI Koovodu, CSI Thozhukkal, CSI Perumpazhuthoor, CSI Cathedral NTA, Sharon CSI Plavilamoola, CSI Malanchani, CSI Mayapuri, CSI NTA, CSI Central NTA, CSI Kalathuvila, Bethel CSI Chittacodu, and Lutheran churches such as St. Peter's Lutheran: Karavakkuzhi, and Bethel Lutheran Church: Vazhuthoor participated in the parade by marching bands, complete with a parade of floats, festivities and familiar Christmas characters. Santa Claus participated in the parade with his magnificently decorated sleigh with huge gift sack on top of a float. Most of the streets in the town were partially closed between 3 pm to 5 pm. The United Christmas Celebrations were inaugurated by Rt. Rev. Dr. Vincent Samual – bishop of Latin Catholic Diocese of NTA. Dr. Shashi Tharoor, the current MP and Rev. Dr. Mani Puthiyidam: Changanassery Athiroopatha Vikari General addressed the gathering. Rev. Pavithrasingh: president of Christian Fellowship presided over the function. The convention started at 5 pm and went on till 12 midnight. The convention was an organized effort of General Convener of Christian Fellowship: J Jose Franklin, Secretary: K Raveendran, Clergy Convener: Rev. T R Satyaraj and president: Rev. L T Pavithrasingh, and other members of the Fellowship: Dr. T Jegin Raj (Velliyavila Sidha Ayurvea Hospital), V Yesudas, Jayakumar, Joyi, Danam, Velukkutty, Sam Jayakumar, Jomi Francis, Susheelan and B B Sanal. The NTA Municipality Chairman S S Jayakumar, Vice-chairperson Adv. L S Sheela and leader of opposition Ansalan felicitated the function. The function was serenaded by local choirs of CSI Town Church, Christ Nagar, NTA. Students of St. Theresa's Convent Girls' Higher Secondary School, NTA, Dr. G R Public School, NTA, Rugmini College of Nursing, Vellarada and children of various church members conducted various Christmas programs in the convention. The convention was closed after a drama Vazhthapetta (beatified) Devasahayam Pillai conducted by Trivandrum Rangakala. During the 10 days’ festival time in NTA town, the roads in the town were illuminated in different colours and the buildings and trees along the Railway Overbridge » KSRTC Stand, TB Junction » Govt. Hospital Junction and Ooruttukala » Allummoodu stretch were lit up. The illuminations were sponsored by NTA Municipal Council and The Christian Fellowship, NTA. There were sparkling illuminations and Christmas characters overlooking the Neyyar River at Amaravila CSI Church compound, NTA CSI Church compound, Thozhukkal CSI Church compound, in and around NTA town and Thirupuram: the outskirts of NTA town.

Christmas Celebrations 2015 in Christ Nagar, NTA,

== Onam Fest & Illuminations (Neyyar Mela), 2015 ==
Onam Celebrations in NTA town, 2014

The Neyyattinkara Area Committee of Kerala State Vyapari Vyavasaya Samithi along with all the residents’ associations in NTA town and NTA Municipal Council (NMC) conducted Neyyar Mela/Fiesta (Neyyar Fest) from 21 August 2015 to 6 September 2015 as part of Onam– Kerala State's national festival, enriched with myriad art and cultural activities. As part of the third edition of 17 days' Onam celebrations in the town the colourful two kilometre Onam inaugural rally began in the morning of 21 August from S N Auditorium, NTA and culminated at NTA Municipal Stadium and it was inaugurated at 9 am by former district panchayat president Anavoor Nagappan and Trivandrum Corporation leader of opposition K Ansalan. The residents came dressed in ethnic wear and traditional pulikali attires/performers along with Talappoli, and people dressed up as Mahabali and Vamana. The students from St Teresa's Convent, Dr G R Public School, Vivekananda Public School and other schools in the town attended the rally. The cultural parade that threw light to the rich and envious tradition of Neyyattinkara was the biggest attraction of the fest. Seasonal illuminations around Onam have become a popular attraction across the town. During the 17 days’ festival time in NTA town, the roads in the town were illuminated in different colours and the buildings and trees along the Vazhuthoor » Railway Overbridge » Hospital Junction » Allummoodu » Swadesabhimani Municipal Park » KSRTC Stand » Vlangamuri; Govt. Hospital Junction » TB Junction » Moonnukallinmoodu » Ooruttukala and TB Junction » Allummoodu stretch were lit up. Special illumination displays were found around all government buildings. A variety of traditional and cultural programs were conducted by residents’ associations in NTA Municipal Ground and in and around the town. There were a number of entertainment events and contests, from story writing, poetry writing, Vanjipaatu, painting contests, flower and floral carpet arrangement, vegetable carving, chess competitions, work experience fair of school students, to boat racing. The fiesta also included a short film fest on environment conservation, a number of rides for the kids as well as a park. The fiesta had scores of stalls, which range from food courts, curio, home appliance and handicraft shops and many more. Exhibition-cum-sale of Kudumbashree products and ornamental fishes was also organised. There were medical exhibitions in the Neyyar Mela/Fiesta conducted by Karakkonam Medical College and other hospitals in Trivandrum district. The Gandhi Memorial Fund stall, where artisans make pots the traditional way, was another big draw. Beautiful clay pots and utensils were also put on sale there. There were ‘Adivasi Ooru’ (Land of Forest Dwellers), in the model of a small tribal village - recreated on the banks of a nearby canal, Valli unjal (Swing), tribal tree houses, ‘Aavi Kuli’ (Steam bath) and other herbal and medicinal techniques set up near the premises of NTA Municipal Stadium. Gandhi Teertha Vallamkali (Gandhi Boat Racing) was held at Valiyakulam pond at Chenkal panchayat, with teams from Kuttanad on 23 August and it was inaugurated by Kerala State Film Development Corporation chairman K Rajmohan Unnithan, presided by H Sugandhi - Vallamkali Aghosha committee chairperson, and welcomed by committee's general convenor N Premkumar. Vijayan Thomas - KTDC chairman, K Ansalan - Neyyar Mela/Fiesta chief coordinator, M R Simon - Parassala block panchayat president, Sudhakaran - KSRTC general manager and Rajaram Manomohanakumar - ward member were among those who attended the event.The Event Were started on 2013 by K.Ansalan (The Secretary of KSVVS) and M.Suresh Kumar (The Area President of KSVVS).Kumarakom team led by M Shanavas and Chenkal team led by Sanil Kulathingal bagged the first and second place respectively. The ceremony came to a close with a Kalarippayattu performance by Poovachal Puthooram Kalari team.

== C S I Churches ==
C S I Neyattinkara
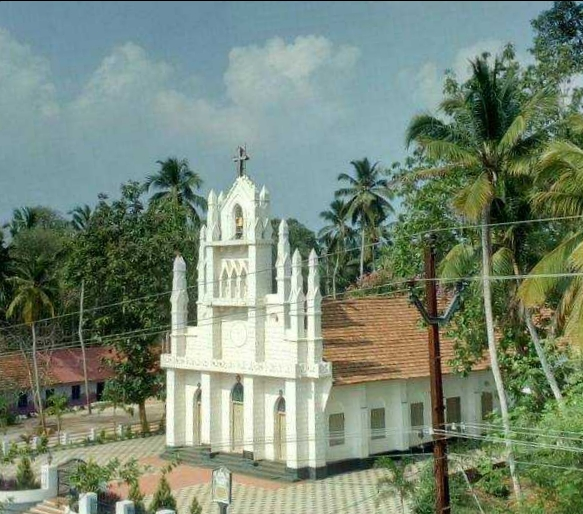
- CSI Neyattinkara Church
- Location: Vlangamuri, Neyyattinkara-695121, Trivandrum, Kerala
- Country: India
- Denomination: Church of South India
- Tradition: Church of England

History
- Founded: 1823

Administration
- Diocese: Diocese of South Kerala of the Church of South India

Clergy
- Bishop: Rt. Rev Dr.Prinstone Ben
- Vicar(s): (1) Rev. M L Sathyasanthoshkumar (District Chairman and Presbyter) (2) Rev.Reji john(Associate Presbyter)

C S I Thozhukkal
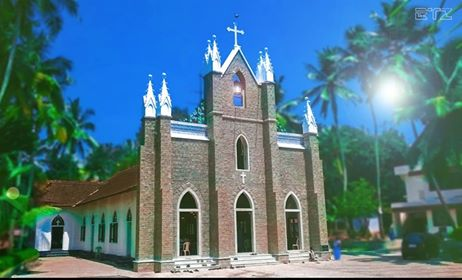
- Thozhukkal C S I Church
- Location: Thozhukkal, Neyyattinkara-695121, Trivandrum, kerala
- Country: India
- Denomination: Church of South India
- Tradition: Church of England
- Website: csithozhukkal.com

History
- Founded: 1845

Administration
- Diocese: Diocese of South Kerala of the Church of South India

Clergy
- Bishop: Rt. Rev Dr S Christopher Vijayan
- Vicar(s): (1) Rev. M Victor John M.Th (District Chairman and Presbyter) (2) Rev. Prasanth Selvomony M.Th (Associate Presbyter)

C S I Amaravila
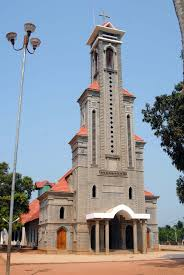
- Amaravila C S I Church
- Location: Amaravila, Neyyattinkara-695122 Trivandrum, Kerala
- Country: India
- Denomination: Church of South India
- Tradition: Church of England
- Website: www.csiamaravila.org

History
- Founded: 1810

Administration
- Diocese: Diocese of South Kerala of the Church of South India

Clergy
- Bishop: Rt. Rev Dr S Christopher Vijayan
- Vicar(s): Rev. Kunjappi Yesudhas (District Chairman and Presbyter)

There are 65 C S I (Church of South India) churches in Neyyattinkara town.

Note: In C S I terminology, the word Area used hereunder is considered as a District. Hence, for instance, Neyyattinkara Area should be read as Neyyattinkara District. Thus, the 65 CSI churches in different areas (districts) of Neyyattinkara town are listed below:

Neyyattinkara Area: (1) C S I Neyyattinkara Town, Christ Nagar (2) C S I Aralumoodu (3). C S I Chenkottukonam (4). C S I Chittacode (5). C S I Christhupuram (6). C S I Neyyattinkara (D.C) (7). C S I Neyyattinkara Metro (8). C S I Sharon Muttacaud Thozhukkal Area (9). C S I Chemmannuvila (10). C S I Kalathuvila (11). C S I Kunnuvila (12). C S I Malanchani (13). C S I Neyyatinkara Central (14). C S I Perumpazhuthoor (15). C S I Punnacadu (16). C S I Thozhukal (D.C) Amaravila Area: (17) C S I Amaravila (D.C), (18). C S I Asapuram, (19). C S I Chaikottukonam, (20). C S I Ismanipuram, (21). C S I Kudumbode, (22). C S I Kurumbal, (23). C S I Palappally, (24). C S I Pasukottukonam, (25). C S I Plancheri Irumbil Area: (26). C S I Irumbil (D.C) (27). C S I Nediyakala (28). C S I Pottayil (29). C S I Thavaravila (30). C S I Thenguvilakuzhi kariprakonam Area: (31). C S I Elavanikkara (32). C S I Kariprakonam (D.C) (33). C S I Koovode (34). C S I Mampazhakara (35). C S I Melariyode (36). C S I Muttacadu Perumkadavila Area: (37). C S I Acqudate (38). C S I Ancode (39). C S I Aruvikara (40). C S I Christhugiri (41). C S I Chulliyoor (42). C S I Manaluvila (43). C S I Mannarakonam (44). C S I Marayamuttam (45). C S I Melkonam (46). C S I Myladumpara (47). C S I Perumkadavila (D.C) (48). C S I Thottavaram Poovathoor Area: (49). C S I Ambayinthala (50). C S I Kaippallikonam (51). C S I Kunnathukal Town (52). C S I Manchavilakom (53). C S I Mannamcode (54). C S I Poovathoor (D.C) (55). C S I Thathiyoor Moolakonam Area: (56). C S I Araumaloor (57). C S I Cheenivila (58). C S I Govindamangalam (59). C S I Mannadikonam (60). C S I Moolakonam (D.C) (61). C S I Palkunnu (62). C S I Perumulloor (63). C S I Poovanvila (64). C S I Pullayil (65). C S I Punnavoor (66). C S I Kariyilthottam( St.Luke's)

Out of the above 65 C S I churches in Neyyattinkara town, the oldest churches are C S I Amaravila and C S I Thozhukkal and the latest one is C S I Neyyattinkara Town situated down by the Neyyar riverside and in the midst of Christ Nagar Residential Area in Christ Nagar. C S I Amaravila or Amaravila C S I Church was established in 1810 and it was known in those days as Emily Chappel. Thozhukkal C S I Church or C S I Thozhukkal was founded by Rev. John Cox in 1845.

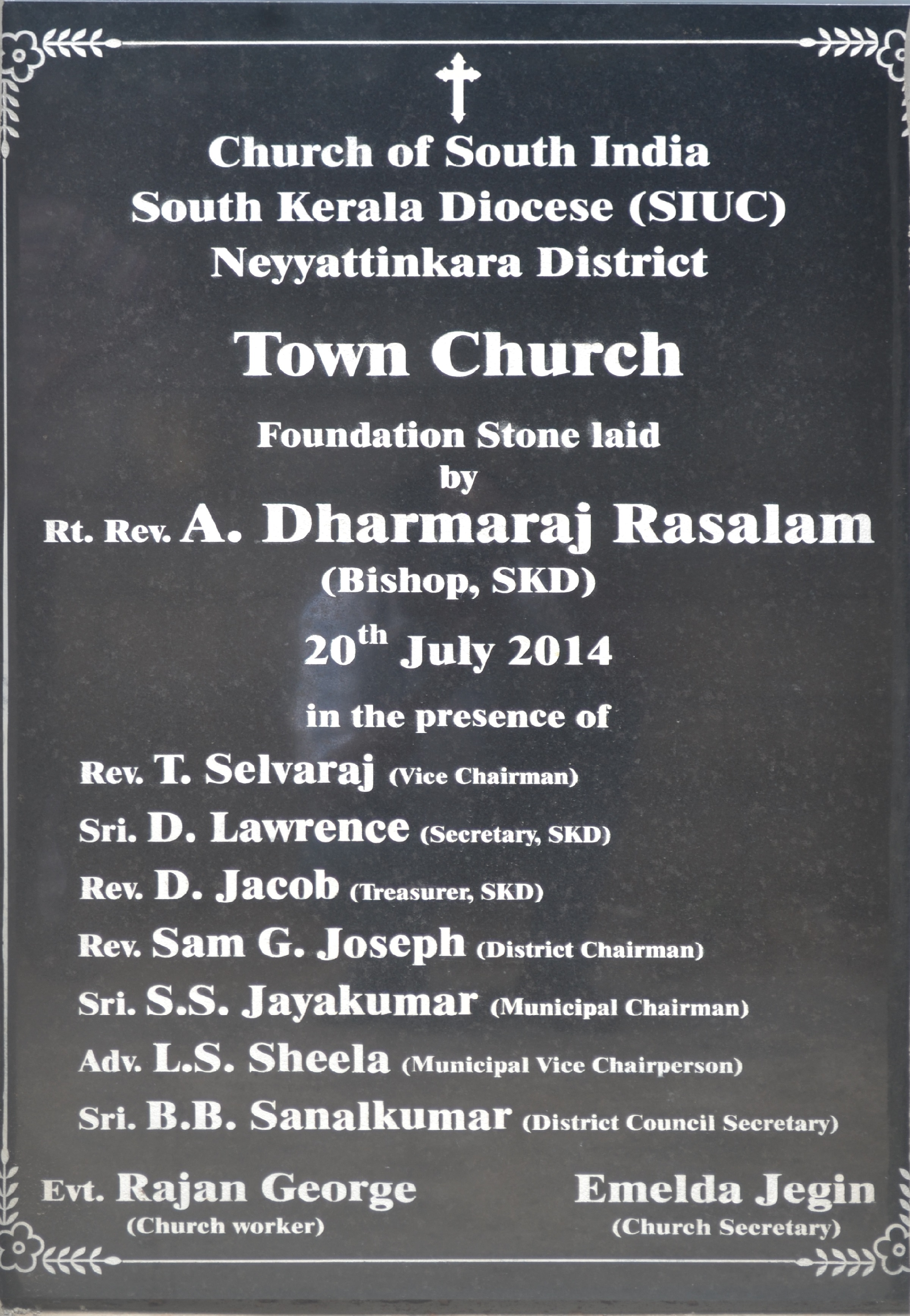
Foundation stone of C S I Town Church, Christ Nagar, Neyyattinkara, laid on 20 July 2014 (the latest CSI Church in NTA town)
