= Arikkadamukku =

Village in Kerala, India

Coordinates: 8°26′56″N 77°1′1″E

Arikkadamukku is a place in Thiruvananthapuram district, Kerala, India. It is located 9 kilometres (5.6 mi) south of Thiruvananthapuram city centre and is a part of Pallichal village. It is connected with Trivandrum, Neyyattinkara, Vizhinjam, Poovar, Kattakkada, Nagarcoil, and Kanyakumari through the nearby National Highway 66. A Post Office is available in Arikkadamukku and Nemom railway station near Arikkadamukku The pincode is 695020.
