= Vedivechankovil =

Village in Thiruvananthapuram District, Kerala, India

Vedivechankovil is a populated place in Thiruvananthapuram district, Kerala, India, situated between Pallichal and Thiruvananthapuram on the Thiruvananthapuram-Neyyattinkara-Kanyakumari highway located about 13 km from the Trivandrum central railway station (Thampanoor).

"Vedi" means cracker. The place took its name from the well-known temple, also known as the Sree Boothamman temple, situated near the highway where offerings are made in the form of exploding firecrackers. Most persons passing through this place will donate to the temple authorities to set off firecrackers for their well-being and progress. They believe that exploding crackers will save them from accidents and other unexpected negative incidents.

The Poomcode temple and Vembannoor Mahadeva temple are also located here.
