= Kanjiramkulam =

- Village
- Location within Kerala
- Coordinates: 8°21′0″N 77°3′0″E
- Country: India
- State: Kerala
- District: Thiruvananthapuram

Government
  - Body: Kanjiramkulam Grama Panchayat
  - Panchayat president: Mrs Shylajakumari B
  - MLA: Mr. M Vincent
  - MP: Dr. Shashi Tharoor
- Elevation: 26 m (85 ft)

Languages
  - Official: Malayalam, English
- Time zone: UTC+5:30 (IST)
- PIN: 695 524
- Telephone code: 91 (0)471 226 0XXX
- Coastline: 78 kilometres (48 mi)
- Sex ratio: 1064
- Literacy: 98.72%
- Climate: Am/Aw (Köppen)
- Precipitation: 1,700 millimetres (67 in)
- Avg. annual temperature: 27.2 °C (81.0 °F)
- Avg. summer temperature: 35 °C (95 °F)
- Avg. winter temperature: 24.4 °C (75.9 °F)

Kanjiramkulam is a village in Thiruvananthapuram district of Kerala State, India and is located on Thiruvananthapuram – Kanyakumari NH 66 bypass. It is located 4.5 km from Neyyattinkara town and 22 km from the Kerala State capital Thiruvananthapuram. The nearest railway station is Neyyattinkara Railway Station (6 km) and the nearest airport is Thiruvananthapuram International Airport (27 km).

== List of Colleges ==
- Kunjukrishnan nadar memorial Government Arts & Science College, Kanjiramkulam
- K N M B.Ed College of Teacher Education, Kanjiramkulam, self finance college
- University institute of technology
- Kerala university, Thiruvananthapuram

== Geography ==
Poovar beach is 4 km from the town; Kovalam beach is 8 km from the town. The distance between Kanjiramkulam town and Vizhinjam International Seaport is 7 km. Ponmudi is 39 km from the town. Neyyar Dam (35 km from Kanjiramkulam town), is another popular picnic spot. Kanyakumari is 64 km from Kanjiramkulam town.

Neighbouring cities & towns

== Climate ==
Köppen-Geiger climate classification system classifies it climate as tropical wet and dry (Aw).

Kanjiramkulam (which lies 4.5 km away to the south west of Neyyattinkara town) has heavy rains during June–August due to the southwest monsoon. Winter starts from December and continues till February. In summer, the temperature rises to a maximum of 32 °C (90 °F) and 31 °C (88 °F) in the winters. Record high temperature in neighbouring Thiruvananthapuram is 39 °C (102 °F). Annual average rainfall is 3,100 mm (120 in).

Climate data for Neyyattinkara
Month	Jan	Feb	Mar	Apr	May	Jun	Jul	Aug	Sep	Oct	Nov	Dec	Year
Mean daily maximum °C (°F)	29.9 (85.8)	30.7 (87.3)	31.7 (89.1)	31.8 (89.2)	31.3 (88.3)	29.1 (84.4)	28.6 (83.5)	28.9 (84.0)	29.3 (84.7)	29.3 (84.7)	29.1 (84.4)	29.3 (84.7)	29.9 (85.8)
Daily mean °C (°F)	26.1 (79.0)	26.9 (80.4)	28.1 (82.6)	28.6 (83.5)	28.2 (82.8)	26.5 (79.7)	25.9 (78.6)	26.2 (79.2)	26.5 (79.7)	26.5 (79.7)	26.2 (79.2)	26 (79)	26.8 (80.3)
Mean daily minimum °C (°F)	22.4 (72.3)	23.2 (73.8)	24.5 (76.1)	25.4 (77.7)	25.2 (77.4)	23.9 (75.0)	23.3 (73.9)	23.5 (74.3)	23.7 (74.7)	23.7 (74.7)	23.4 (74.1)	22.7 (72.9)	23.7 (74.7)
Average precipitation mm (inches)	19 (0.7)	27 (1.1)	52 (2.0)	144 (5.7)	248 (9.8)	457 (18.0)	336 (13.2)	222 (8.7)	201 (7.9)	290 (11.4)	205 (8.1)	55 (2.2)	2,256 (88.8)
Average rainy days	1	2	3	8	10	19	17	14	11	12	8	3	108
Mean daily sunshine hours	9	9	8	8	7	5	5	6	6	6	6	7	7
Source 1: Climate-Data.org
Source 2: Weatherbase Trivandrum, India for sunshine and rainy days

== See also ==
- Neyyattinkara
- Neyyattinkara Railway Station
- Amaravila
- Parassala
- Neyyattinkara Sree Krishna Swami Temple
- Upper cloth revolt
- Thiruvananthapuram
- Municipalities of Kerala
