= NYY =

NYY or nyy may refer to:

- New York Yankees, an American professional baseball team based in the Bronx, New York City
- NYY, the station code for Neyyattinkara railway station, Kerala, India
- nyy, the ISO 639-3 code for Nyakyusa language, Tanzania, Malawi
