= Parassala Mahadeva Temple =

Hindu Temple in Parassala, Kerala

- Temple entrance

- Location within Kerala

Religion
- Affiliation: Hinduism
- District: Thiruvananthapuram
- Governing body: Travancore Devaswom Board

Location
- Location: Thiruvananthapuram
- State: Kerala
- Country: India
- Coordinates: 9°30′5″N 76°35′5″E

Architecture
- Type: Kerala-Dravidian style

Parassala Sree Mahadeva temple is one of the foremost centres of worship in south Kerala and the temple is situated at the tiny village of Parassala adjoining the Kerala - Tamil Nadu boundary. Here the deity, Lord Siva is facing the west, which is considered as a rare phenomenon, and devotees even from far off places attend the worship. It was built by Mallen Chembakaraman Delava of Venad royal family. Parvathy devi in this temple is facing East towards the backside.

The temple is centuries old and the structure is rare stone architecture and Parvathy Devi and Vighneswara are the upadevathas. The temple is famous for its rare rites and ceremonies and from time immemorial entry was allowed to all sects in the community irrespective of caste or creed and significantly arayas - a backward community have the privilege of participation for the commencement of important rituals in the temple from ancient times onwards and the Lord render blessings to all irrespective of caste, colour or creed. Parassala, the holy place is well known for communal harmony.
