= Kunnathukal =

- village
- Location in Kerala, India Kunnathukal (India)
- Coordinates: 8°23′23.54″N 77°9′43.52″E
- Country: India
- State: Kerala
- District: Thiruvananthapuram

Government
  - Type: Panchayati raj (India)
  - Body: Gram panchayat

Languages
  - Official: Malayalam, English
- Time zone: UTC+5:30 (IST)
- Vehicle registration: KL-19

Kunnathukal is a village in Perumkadavila Block Panchayat, of Thiruvananthapuram district in the Indian state of Kerala. It is located 30 km from Trivandrum city.

Kunnathukal shares a border with Tamil Nadu state along its south east region.

The holy Major Chezhunganoor Mahadeva Temple is located in this village. The Chimmindi Temple also belongs to this panchayat.

== Politics ==
The panchayat of Kunnathukal
