= Anavoor =

- village
- Location in Kerala, India Anavoor (India)
- Coordinates: 8°25′0″N 77°5′0″E
- Country: India
- State: Kerala
- District: Thiruvananthapuram
- Talukas: Neyyattinkara

Government
  - Body: Gram panchayat

Population (2011)
  - Total: 14,667

Languages
  - Official: Malayalam, English
- Time zone: UTC+5:30 (IST)
- PIN: 695124
- Vehicle registration: KL-

Anavoor is a village in Thiruvananthapuram district in the state of Kerala, India.

== Demographics ==
As of 2011 India census, Anavoor had a population of 14667 with 7221 males and 7446 females. Anavoor village-kunnathukal panchayath-neyyattinkara taluk-trivandrum district. Ghss Anavoor is the popular school. Agriculture is the main occupation of the people.
