= Ammachi Plavu =

Historical Jack-fruit tree

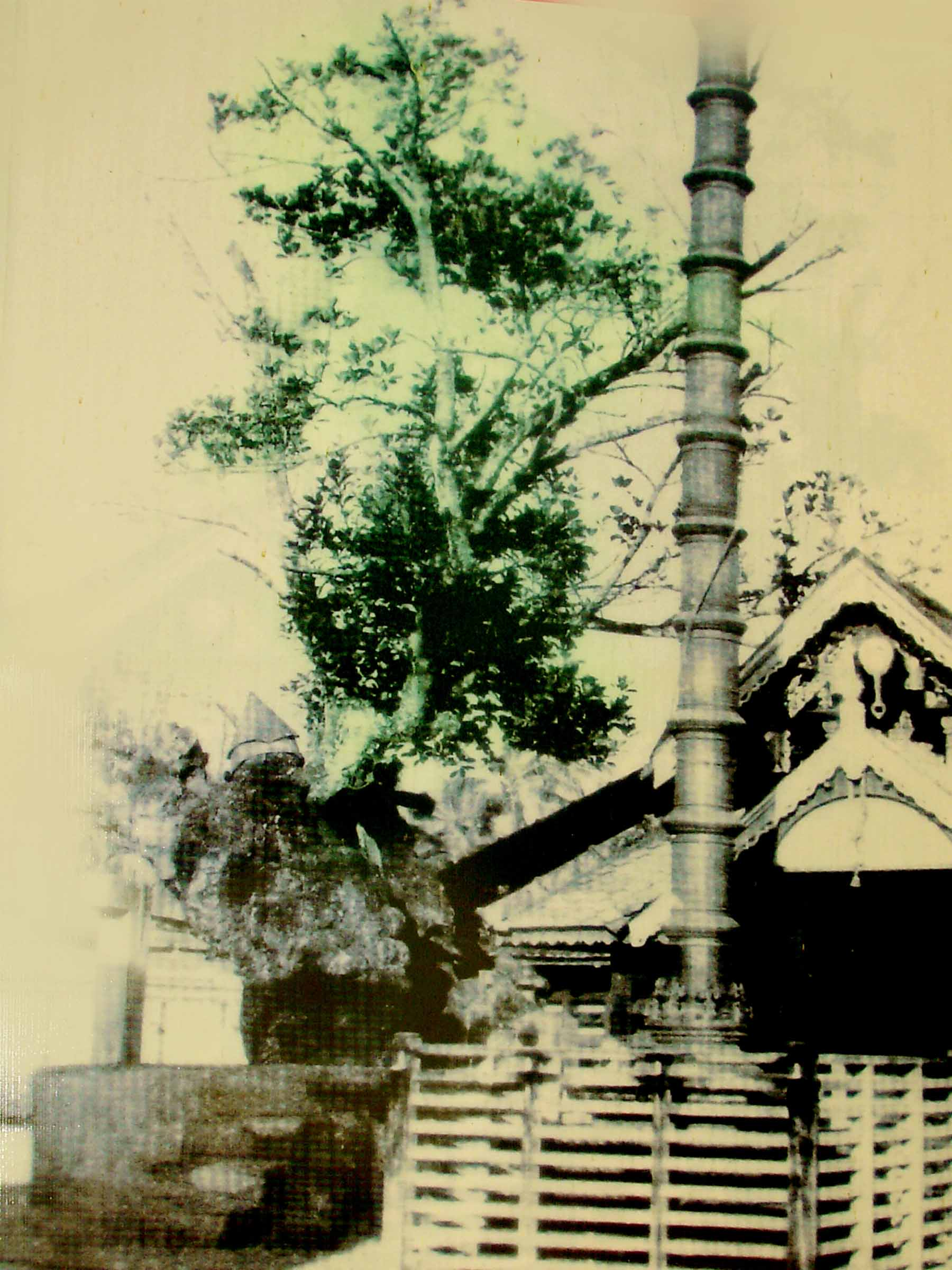
- Native name: അമ്മച്ചി പ്ലാവ് (Malayalam)
- Species: Artocarpus

Ammachi Plavu literally translated from Malayalam, it means grandmother Jack-fruit tree or an old Jackfruit tree, Located in inside of Neyyattinkara Sree Krishna Swami Temple in Thiruvananthapuram Kerala.

== History ==
Ammachi Plavu is legendarily connected with the period of Anizham Thirunal Marthanda Varma (1729 -1758). The 'Ettuveetil Pillamar' had challenged Marthanda Varma who ruled Travancore. Ettuveetil Pillamar, who had a decisive influence in the country, had taken steps to end Marthanda Varma's supremacy and rule. Marthanda Varma had often gone into hiding in fear of the Ettuveetil Pillamar and he also regularly changed his residence so as not to be identified by Ettuveetil Pillamar. Marthanda Varma, certain that the enemy was behind him, crossed the Neyyar river and reached the opposite side. When he was trying to hide himself in a safe place, he saw a boy who was grazing cows. The boy hid him in the hollow trunk of a jackfruit tree and thus helped him escape his enemies. Jackfruit tree which helped the king save his life came to be known as "Ammachi Plavu". At present, the hollow trunk is preserved by the Kerala State Department of Archaeology. Later on, Marthanda Varma found that it was none other than Lord Krishna himself who saved him from his enemies, and he constructed a temple to him near the Jackfruit tree, which is now a very popular tourist spot in Southern Kerala.

== See also ==
- Neyyattinkara Sree Krishna Swami Temple
- Marthanda Varma
- Ettuveetil Pillamar
- Neyyar (river)
