= Athiyannur, Thiruvananthapuram =

Athiyannur
- town
- Location in Kerala, India Athiyannur (India)
- Coordinates: 8.4288°N 77.0498°E
- Country: India
- State: Kerala
- District: Thiruvananthapuram
- Talukas: Neyyattinkara

Government
  - Body: Gram panchayat

Population (2011)
  - Total: 40,712

Languages
  - Official: Malayalam, English
- Time zone: UTC+5:30 (IST)
- PIN: 695123
- Vehicle registration: KL-

Athiyannur is a town in Thiruvananthapuram district in the state of Kerala, India. It is located 21 kilometres (13 mi) south-east from Thiruvananthapuram, the state capitol.

== Demographics ==
As of the 2011 Census of India, Athiyannur had a population of 40,712 with 19,711 males and 21,001 females. This includes the village of Venpakal.
