= Parasuvaikkal =

- village
- Location in Kerala, India Parasuvaikkal (India)
- Coordinates: 8.3648°N 77.1375°E
- Country: India
- State: Kerala
- District: Thiruvananthapuram

Government
  - Body: Parassala Grama panchayat

Population (2011)
  - Total: 17,698

Languages
  - Official: Malayalam, English
- Time zone: UTC+5:30 (IST)
- PIN: 695 508
- Telephone code: +91 471 22
- Vehicle registration: KL-19
- Nearest city: Thiruvananthapuram
- Lok Sabha constituency: Thiruvananthapuram
- Assembly constituency: Parassala

Parasuvaikkal is a village in Thiruvananthapuram district in the state of Kerala, India.

Parasuvaikkal has four Hindu temples, Parasuvaikkal major Sree Bhagavathy temple governed by Travancore Devaswom Board, Ponnamkulam Devi Kshethram, Idanatukonam Sree Dharma Sastha Temple and Kottakkakam Sree Mahadeva Kshethram Trust. A mosque and number of churches are there. Educational institutions are very few in number.

== Transport ==
Connected from major cities. NH 66 Road passing through Parasuvaikal via to Kanniyakumari.

Parasuvaikkal is the next village after Parassala from Kerala - Tamil Nadu Border and its well connected to a number of major cities in Kerala by road and rail.

A small railway station in the Southern Railway network is nearby, namely Dhanuvachapuram. Most of the passenger trains stops here.

The Salem - Kanyakumari National Highway (NH 66) passes through the village. Government buses as well as private bus services operate between Thiruvananthapuram and other major towns such as Parassala, Neyyattinkara, Balaramapuram, Kollam and the northern districts of Kerala.

Thiruvananthapuram International Airport, Cochin International Airport, Tuticorin Airport, Madurai Airport are the nearest airports.

== Demographics ==
As of 2011 India census, Parasuvaikkal had a population of 17698 with 8676 males and 9022 females.

== Religious Institutions ==
- Parashuvakkal CSI Church
- Parashuvakkal Bhagavathi Temple
- Ponnamkulam Devi Temple
- Kottaykkakam Sree Mahadeva Temple
- Ardhanareeswara Temple
- Thekkumkara Sree Mahavishnu Temple
