= Thirupuram =

- village
- Location in Kerala, India Thirupuram (India)
- Coordinates: 8.3499700°N 77.073460°E
- Country: India
- State: Kerala
- District: Thiruvananthapuram

Government
  - Body: Gram panchayat

Population (2011)
  - Total: 38,351

Languages
  - Official: Malayalam, English
- Time zone: UTC+5:30 (IST)
- PIN: 695525 & 695133
- Vehicle registration: KL-19
- Nearest city: Thiruvananthapuram
- Vidhan Sabha constituency: Neyyattinkara

Thirupuram is a village in Thiruvananthapuram district in the state of Kerala, India.

Thirupuram village is 6 km away from Neyyattinkara, 25 km away from the capital city Thiruvananthapuram. The famous Thirupuram Siva Temple is situated here. Thirupuram is also very near to the Poovar, Vizhinjam and Kovalam. This village is known for its celebration of the Sivarathri festival. It is believed that this is the place where lord Siva sits after the Thripura dahanam. Thus the village got the name Thripuram which later got changed to Thirupuram.

== Demographics ==
As of 2011 India census, Thirupuram had a population of 38351 with 18732 males and 19619 females.
