= Perumpazhuthoor =

- village
- Location in Kerala, India Perumpazhuthoor (India)
- Coordinates: 8°26′0″N 77°6′0″E
- Country: India
- State: Kerala
- District: Thiruvananthapuram

Government
  - Body: Municipality

Languages
  - Official: Malayalam, English
- Time zone: UTC+5:30 (IST)
- PIN: 695 126
- Telephone code: 0471
- Vehicle registration: KL-20
- Coastline: 0 kilometres (0 mi)
- Lok Sabha constituency: Thiruvananthapuram
- Climate: Tropical monsoon (Köppen)
- Avg. summer temperature: 35 °C (95 °F)
- Avg. winter temperature: 20 °C (68 °F)

Perumpazhuthoor is a village on the bank of Neyyar River, about 3 km away from the taluk municipality of Neyyattinkara in Thiruvananthapuram district in the Indian state of Kerala. This place lies on the road leading from Neyyattinkara (off NH 47) towards the tourist attraction Neyyar Dam. This place is a pilgrim centre for Sri Narayana Guru pilgrim temple is situated here. The Sri Narayana Guru Temple is located at a lush green scenic spot on the Neyyar's shore.

Perumpazhuthoor's high school has since grown to a Junior College, and it has a Polytechnic Institute.

== History ==
- Perumpazuthoor

== Geography ==
Perumpazhuthoor has an average elevation of 24 metres (85 feet). The town is situated near by the Neyyar River side, one of the principal rivers in Trivandrum district. The river flows to the south part of the town. Water Supply for the town and the adjacent places is obtained from this river. Topography of the town is rather uneven, with higher areas in the downtown. Nearby the town is the hillock Aruvippuram. The Western Ghats പശ്ചിമഘട്ടം - സഹ്യാദ്രി ( സഹ്യപർവ്വതം ) form a scenic backdrop to the town. . The nearby sea shore is just 13 km. away in west, and 10 kilometres to the east can take you to the mammoth hillocks of Western ghats പശ്ചിമഘട്ടം - സഹ്യാദ്രി ( സഹ്യപർവ്വതം ) . The geology is said to be typical of the Kerala soil - the Laterite and Red soil. The town can still boast of a good green cover in residential and non-residential areas.

== Closest cities, towns and villages ==
Poovar beach is 15 km from the town; Kovalam beach is 18 km away. The distance between Perumpazuthoor town and Vizhinjam International Seaport is 17 km. Ponmudi is 55 km from the town. Neyyar Dam (24 km from Perumpazuthoor town), is another popular picnic spot. Kanyakumari is 65 km from Perumpazuthoor town. Kattakada town is 12 km from here.

== Wards in Neyyattinkara Municipal Area ==
Neyyattinkara Municipal Area is divided into 44 wards. The respective ward numbers assigned by the Municipality are given in brackets. For official matters ward numbers are generally mentioned in Roman numerals. The wards are: (1). Aralummoodu, (2) Puthanambalam, (3) Moonnukallinmoodu, (4) Koottappana, (5) Pallivilakam, (6) Punnakkadu, (7) Kalathuvila, (8) Vadakodu, (9) Muttakkadu, (10) Elavanikkara, (11) Mampazhakkara, (12) Mullaravila, (13) Perumpazhuthoor, (14) Alampotta, (15) Plavila, (16) Thozhukkal, (17) Vazhuthoor (includes Christ Nagar, Mythry Nagar and Keerthi Nagar), (18) Kollavamvila, (19) Thavaravila, (20) kulathamal, (21) Chaikottukonam, (22) Maruthathoor, (23) Irumbil (includes Arakkunnu and Stuart Nagar), (24) Fort (includes Vadakkey-kotta & Police Quarters), (25) Vlangamuri, (26) Krishnapuram, (27) Rameswaram, (28) Narayanapuram, (29) Amaravila, (30) Pullamala, (31) Pirayummoodu, (32) Olathanni, (33) Chundavila, (34) Athazhamangalam, (35) Kavalakulam, (36) Panagattukari, (37) Nilamel, (38) Manaloor, (39) Ooruttukala, (40) Alummoodu, (41) Town, (42) Brahmamkodu, (43) Athiyannoor, (44) Vazhimukku

These 44 wards are under the surveillance of Neyyattinkara Municipality (a local self-government or LSG). In each ward there is a Ward Councillor democratically elected for a period of 5 years. These Councillors represent the people in the ward concerned. In most of the wards there are Kudumbasree units of Kudumbashree Mission (Kerala) initiated for the development of womenfolk especially unemployed housewives.
