= Pallichal =

- District
- Location in Kerala, India Pallichal (India)
- Coordinates: 8.4528800°N 77.025500°E
- Country: India
- State: Kerala
- District: Thiruvananthapuram

Government
  - Body: Gram panchayat

Population (2011)
  - Total: 53,861

Languages
  - Official: Malayalam, English
- Time zone: UTC+5:30 (IST)
- PIN: 695020
- Vehicle registration: KL-20

Pallichal is a village in Thiruvananthapuram district in the state of Kerala, India. Pallichal is the village which get first fully e-literate panchayat in the Kerala state. Pallichal revenue village comes under the Neyyattinkara (tehsil) taluk.

== Demographics ==
As of 2011 India census, Pallichal had a population of 53,861 with 26,490 males and 27,371 females.
