= Amaravila =

- Village
- Location within Kerala Location within India
- Coordinates: 8.4°N 77.08°E
- Country: India
- State: Kerala

Government
  - Body: Neyyattinkara Municipality
  - Chairperson: Smt. W R Herba (CPI (M) party)
  - Vice Chairperson: Sri. K.K.Shibu (CPI (M) party)
  - Member of the Legislative Assembly (India): Ansalin (CPI(M) party)
  - Member of Parliament: Shashi Tharoor (Indian National Congress party, re-elected in 2014)
- Elevation: 26 m (85 ft)

Languages
  - Official: Malayalam, English
- Time zone: UTC+5:30 (IST)
- PIN: 695 122
- Telephone code: 91 (0)471 XXX XXXX
- Vehicle registration: KL-20
- Sex ratio: 1064
- Literacy: 98.72%
- Civic agency: Neyyattinkara Municipality
- Website: http://www.neyyattinkaramunicipality.in

Amaravila is a village in Neyyattinkara town in Trivandrum district, Kerala State, India. Kerala's second largest checkpost after Walayar is situated in Amaravila. This village is situated in NH 47 on the way to Kanyakumari, on the Kerala - Tamil Nadu border.

CSI Amaravila

Amaravila CSI church or CSI Amaravila, founded in 1810 and known in those days as Emily Chapel, an old Anglican Church (Anglican Communion), is one of the main attractions of this village.

== See also ==
- Neyyattinkara
- Neyyattinkara Railway Station
- Neyyattinkara Sree Krishna Swami Temple
- Amaravila Rameswaram Sri Mahadeva Temple
- Thiruvananthapuram
- Municipalities of Kerala
- Upper cloth revolt
