= Parassala =

- Town
- Location in Kerala, India Parassala (India)
- Coordinates: 8.3431°N 77.1526°E
- Country: India
- State: Kerala
- District: Thiruvananthapuram

Area
  - Total: 10.81 km^{2} (4.17 sq mi)

Population (2011)
  - Total: 34,096
  - Density: 3,154/km^{2} (8,169/sq mi)

Languages
  - Official: Malayalam, English
- Time zone: UTC+5:30 (IST)
- PIN: 695502
- Telephone code: 0471-220
- Vehicle registration: KL-19
- Nearest city: Thiruvananthapuram (29 km)
- Lok Sabha constituency: Thiruvananthapuram
- Climate: monsoon climate (Köppen)

Parassala is a small town in Neyyatinkara taluk of Thiruvananthapuram district in Kerala, India. It is situated 29 km south east of state capital Thiruvananthapuram in Kerala, bordering Tamil Nadu.

== Demographics ==
A part of earlier generation of the population were involved in the collecting of palmyra nectar and fermenting to produce alcoholic drinks. The typical nectar collected on pots from atop palmyra trees are also used for making 'karupatti' which is known for its medicinal properties. Three generations before, the people of Parassala have achieved socio-economic development because of the establishment of various educational and health care organizations by various religious groups and government.

== Health ==
The major hospitals in the town are Govt Taluk Hospital, Saraswathy Multispeciality Hospital and SP Multispeciality Hospital. Then a government Sidha hospital, a government Ayurvedha hospital, a government Veterinary hospital, a government homoeo dispensary and Telhara Homoeo care have given drastic change to the rustic image of this old town. The panchayat also holds a Medical College at Karakonam.

== Education ==
Prominent educational institutions in Parassala are Government Vocational Higher Secondary School, Evans Higher Secondary School, Teachers Training Institute, Government Women ITI, Saraswathy College of Nursing, CSI Institute of Legal Studies, CSI B.ed College, Samuel LMS Upper primary school and Sree Krishna Pharmacy College.

== Notable people ==
• Parassala B. Ponnammal, recipient of Padma shri, an elderly woman who was the first female singer in the famous Navarathri Mandapam of Thiruvananthapuram during 2006 comes from this town.

== Politics ==
Parassala assembly constituency is part of Thiruvananthapuram (Lok Sabha constituency). The former late deputy speaker of the Kerala Legislative Assembly, Sundaran Nadar, is from Parassala. The current MLA is C.K.Hareendran. Now, from November 2015, local self election conducted by state election commission and won Left Democratic front and Com. Manju Smitha elected as panchayat President. Parassala comes under Thiruvananthapuram Constituent Assembly and Mr.Shashi Tharoor is the current MP.

== Religion ==
Parassala Sree Mahadeva Temple is one of the foremost centres of worship in south Kerala and the temple is situated at the tiny village of Parassala adjoining the Kerala Tamil Nadu boundary. Here the deity, Lord Siva is facing the west, which is considered as a rare phenomenon, and devotees even from far off places attend the worship. It was built by Mallen Chembakaraman Delava of Venad royal family.

The temple is centuries old and the structure is rare stone architecture and Parvathy devi and Vighneswara are the upadevathas. The temple is famous for its rare rites and ceremonies and from time immemorial entry was allowed to all sects in the community irrespective of caste or creed and significantly arayas – a backward community have the privilege of participation for the commencement of important rituals in the temple from ancient times onwards and the Lord render blessings to all irrespective of caste, colour or creed. Parassala, the holy place is well known for communal harmony. Elankam Bhuvaneswary temple is another religious attraction in Parassala.

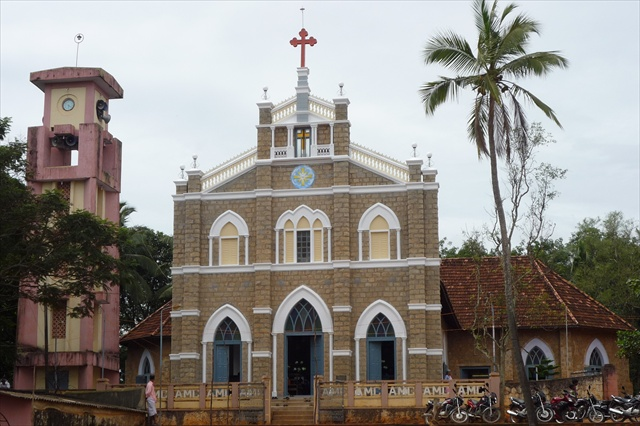
Abbs Memorial Church

Many Christian worship places are there in Parassala. That includes a good number of RC (Roman Catholic), ECI, CSI, Lutheran, Pentecost Church of God Zionkunnu and Assemblies of God churches. Church of El-Shaddai at Anchali Jn. is a Pentecostal worship centre. Jehovah's Witnesses are also active in this area since 1975.

There are a good number of Muslims in this constituency, which depicts the communal harmony of the place. One of the most famous Christian Church in Parassala is St. Peter's Church located in Hospital Junction built in 1604 by the Portuguese, very recently renovated and the Abbs Memorial Church, built in the 1850s by the English missionary Rev. John Abbs who was sent to India by the London Missionary Society(L.M.S.). The church choir is called "Abbs Echoes" with their main vision stated as "To produce the echoes of The Great Missionary Abbs." Southern Kurisumala is the location of a famous Christian pilgrim location, which is not only visited by Christians, but by other religious people also.

Parassala is famous for the HARE KRISHNA temple located in Neduvanvila, which is part of International Society for Krishna Consciousness. Local women from all walks of life and religion gather here as part of women empowerment. This centre houses a go-shala (shelter for cows) and anganvadi ( school for toddlers).

== Transport ==
=== Air ===
The nearest airport to Parassala is Thiruvananthapuram International Airport in Thiruvananthapuram. It is 33 km from Parassala town.

=== Rail ===
The nearest station is Parassala.

== Climate ==
The Köppen-Geiger climate classification system classifies its climate as Tropical monsoon climate (Am).

Parassala has heavy rains during June–August due to the southwest monsoon. There is no proper winter season as temperature do not fall below 20 °C (68 °F). In summer, the temperature rises to a maximum of 32 °C (90 °F) and 31 °C (88 °F) in the winters. Record high temperature in neighbouring Thiruvananthapuram is 39 °C (102 °F). Annual average rainfall is 3,100 mm (120 in).

Climate data for Neyyattinkara
Month	Jan	Feb	Mar	Apr	May	Jun	Jul	Aug	Sep	Oct	Nov	Dec	Year
Mean daily maximum °C (°F)	29.9 (85.8)	30.7 (87.3)	31.7 (89.1)	31.8 (89.2)	31.3 (88.3)	29.1 (84.4)	28.6 (83.5)	28.9 (84.0)	29.3 (84.7)	29.3 (84.7)	29.1 (84.4)	29.3 (84.7)	29.9 (85.8)
Daily mean °C (°F)	26.1 (79.0)	26.9 (80.4)	28.1 (82.6)	28.6 (83.5)	28.2 (82.8)	26.5 (79.7)	25.9 (78.6)	26.2 (79.2)	26.5 (79.7)	26.5 (79.7)	26.2 (79.2)	26 (79)	26.8 (80.3)
Mean daily minimum °C (°F)	22.4 (72.3)	23.2 (73.8)	24.5 (76.1)	25.4 (77.7)	25.2 (77.4)	23.9 (75.0)	23.3 (73.9)	23.5 (74.3)	23.7 (74.7)	23.7 (74.7)	23.4 (74.1)	22.7 (72.9)	23.7 (74.7)
Average precipitation mm (inches)	19 (0.7)	27 (1.1)	52 (2.0)	144 (5.7)	248 (9.8)	457 (18.0)	336 (13.2)	222 (8.7)	201 (7.9)	290 (11.4)	205 (8.1)	55 (2.2)	2,256 (88.8)
Average rainy days	1	2	3	8	10	19	17	14	11	12	8	3	108
Mean daily sunshine hours	9	9	8	8	7	5	5	6	6	6	6	7	7
Source 1: Climate-Data.org
Source 2: Weatherbase Trivandrum, India for sunshine and rainy days

== See also ==
- Neyyattinkara
- Neyyattinkara Railway Station
- Amaravila
- Kanjiramkulam
- Thiruvananthapuram
- Municipalities of Kerala
- Neyyattinkara Sree Krishna Swami Temple
- Upper cloth revolt
