= Neyyattinkara Sree Krishna Swami Temple =

Hindu temple in Kerala, India

- നെയ്യാറ്റിൻകര ശ്രീ കൃഷ്ണ സ്വാമി ക്ഷേത്രം
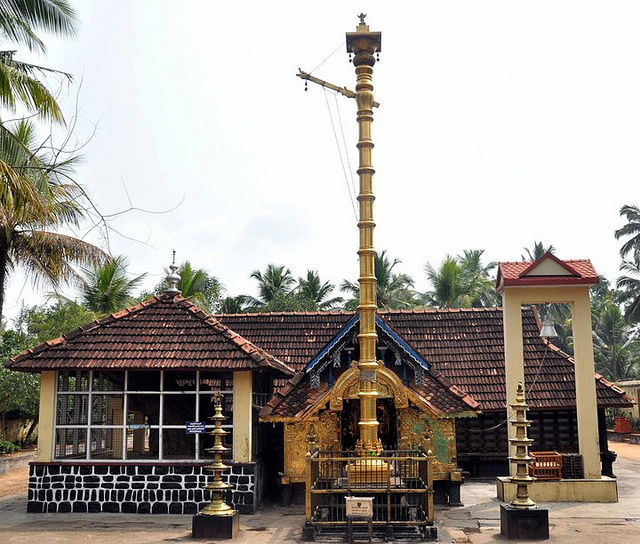
- Temple entrance

- Location in Kerala

Religion
- Affiliation: Hinduism
- District: Thiruvananthapuram
- Deity: Krishna
- Festival: Annual festival during the Malayalam month of Meenam
- Governing body: Travancore Devaswom Board

Location
- Location: Neyyattinkara
- State: Kerala
- Country: India
- Coordinates: 8°24′06″N 77°05′18″E

Architecture
- Type: Dravidian architecture
- Style: Kerala style
- Founder: Anizham Thirunal Marthanda Varma
- Established: Between 1750 - 1755
- Elevation: 42.94 m (141 ft)

Neyyattinkara Sree Krishna Swamy Temple is a Hindu temple dedicated to Krishna situated at Neyyattinkara, 20 km (12 mi) south of Thiruvananthapuram in Kerala, India. It is one of the important temples of Krishna in Kerala with great historic importance. The temple enshrines Unnikannan in the form of Navaneetha Krishna as the presiding deity. Thrikkayyilvenna or Thrikkayyil Venna (butter) is a unique offering to Neyyattinkara Unnikannan, the deity of the temple. World famous musicians Sri. Neyyattinkara Mohanachandran and Neyyaattinkara Vasudevan used to perform concerts regularly in temple festival.

== Legend and history ==
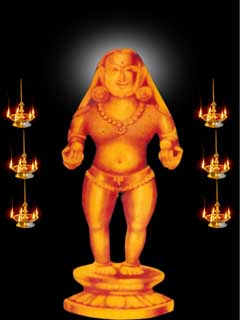
Neyyattinkara Unni Kannan

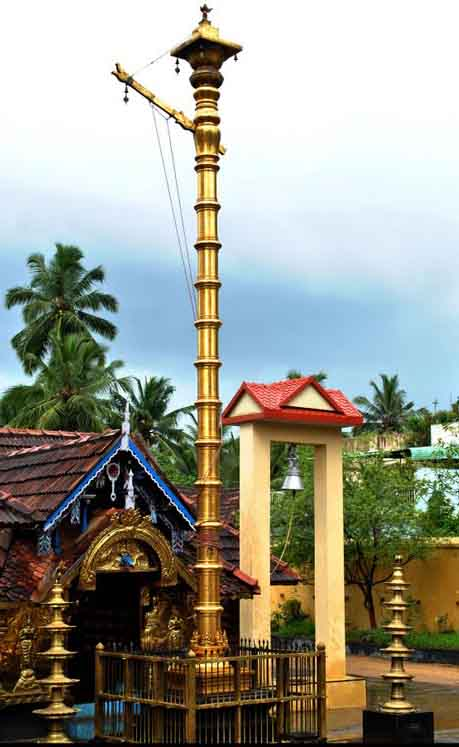
The Golden Flagmast at the Temple

Neyyattinkara Shri Krishnaswamy Temple is supposed to be built in between AD 1750 - AD 1755, by His Highness Anizham Thirunal Marthanda Varma, the then maharajah of the erstwhile Indian princely state of Travancore. The history/legend behind the construction of this temple is, the then ruler, His Highness Anizham Thirunal Marthandavarma was surrounded by his enemies, arguably the high-profile "Ettuveettil Pillamar" while he was near the place where the temple is now situated. The king was trying to hide himself in a safe place. At that time, a small boy was seen there and this boy advised the king to hide himself inside the hollow trunk of a huge jack fruit tree nearby. The king heeded to this advice and was saved from his enemies. Later, the king tried to ascertain the identity of the boy, but could not. The king then strongly believed that it was in fact Lord Krishna/Unnikrishna himself who saved his life and he decided to build a temple for Lord Krishna, as a gratitude, at the exact place where he hid inside the jack fruit tree and thus Neyyattinkara Sree Krishna temple came into existence. The huge jack fruit tree which helped the king save his life came to be known as "Ammachi Plavu" (Mother/Grandmother jack fruit tree, personifying one who protected the king). Until AD 1970–75, the offshoots of the original tree was present bearing a huge amount of jack fruits, but these offshoots had to be cut in order to preserve the actual hollow trunk where the king hid himself. At present, the hollow trunk is in a preserved state (by Archaeological Department) and is visible to all devotees who visit this temple.

== Temple complex ==
Neyyattinkara Sreekrishna Temple, situated in a vast land with much greenery, is regarded as the Guruvayur of Thiruvananthapuram district. The temple is built in traditional Kerala architecture and is decorated with beautiful artistic sculptures. The main gopuram (gateway) of the temple displays a beautiful scene from Bhagavad Gita - Lord Krishna offering teaching to Arjuna.

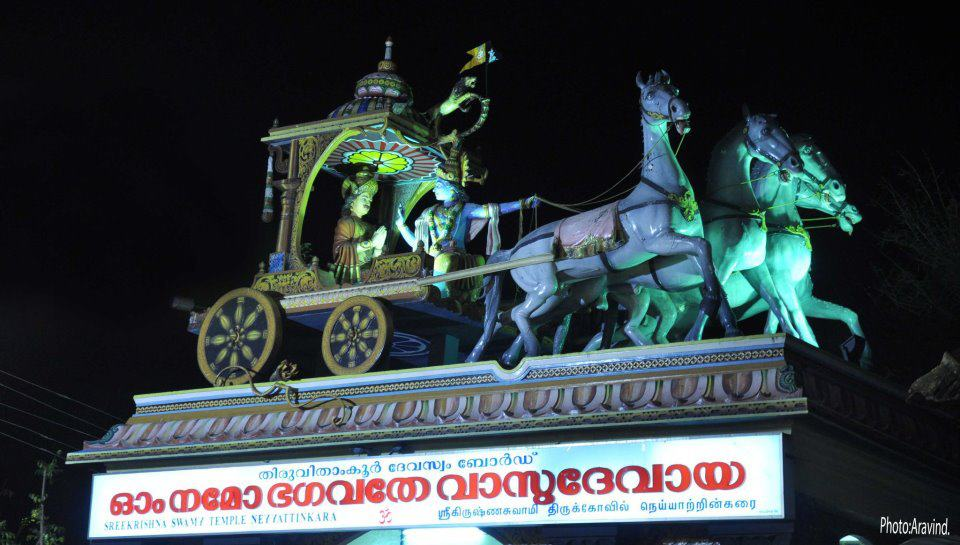
Entrance Gopura of the temple

The sanctum sanctorum is built in the traditional Kerala style. Now the door to the Shri Kovil is painted with gold. There is a huge Gopuram in front of the Shri Kovil. Inside the main complex, there are the deities of Ganesha, and Dharmashashtha. Outside the main complex, Nagaraja is worshipped. Currently, work has been going on to make a nadappanthal all around the main arena, so that pilgrims could avoid extremes of weather. This is done by advisory committee with the help of devotees of Unnikannan.

The walls of the Sanctum are painted with various pictures, depicting the life of Shree Krishna and various other Gods.

There is an elephant named "Neyyattinkara Kannan" in the temple.

== Customs and traditions ==
Ashtami Rohini, Vishu, Navarathri, Mandalapooja are observed with great fervour in this temple. The main festival of the temple is its Annual Festival, which is during Meenam. It commences with the "Kodiyett", where the main priest of the temple will hoist a Sacred flag atop the gopura, signifying the commencement of the festival. It ends with an "Aaraatt", which falls on a Rohini star day in the Malayalam month of Meenam, when the deity is taken out of the temple, and is dipped in water, in the nearby Graamam in the Neyyar river. In the midst of the festival, jewels of Unnikkannan will be brought from another temple, where they are ceremoniously kept for safekeeping. The main pooja of that evening has much significance, where hundreds throng to get a glimpse of Unnikkannan, adoring all the divine jewels.

During Navarathri, three deities will rest at the temple, on their way to Shri Padmanabhaswamy Temple in Thiruvananthapuram. They are Shri Kumaraswami, from Kumarakoil temple; Shri Munnuutti Nanga; and Shri Sarawathi Devi. They will stay overnight at the Krishna Temple, and leave for Thiruvananthapuram next morning. There will be grand arrangements all along the way and at the temple for welcoming the deities.

== Deities in the temple ==
The presiding deity is Krishna in the form of Balakrishna holding butter in both hands. West-facing idol is made of panchaloha. Legend says, the original idol was made of wood but Lord Krishna was not amused of this, and while that idol was being carried in a boat across the Neyyar, the boat got stuck and would not move. In order to keep the time frame intact, another idol was installed at the temple.

Upadevathas or Sub-deities in the temple premises include Ganesha, Dharmasastha and Nagaraja.

== Administration ==
This is one of the major temples under the Travancore Devaswom Board. Every two years, an advisory committee (Kshetra Upadeshaka Samithi) comprising a President, Secretary and members is selected from among the neighborhood people. This committee undertakes the task of organizing the various festivals in this temple.

== See also ==
- List of Hindu temples in Kerala
- Neyyattinkara
- Guruvayur Temple
- Udupi Sri Krishna Matha
- Marthandavarma (novel)
