= Neyyattinkara railway station =

Railway station in Kerala, India

Neyyattinkara
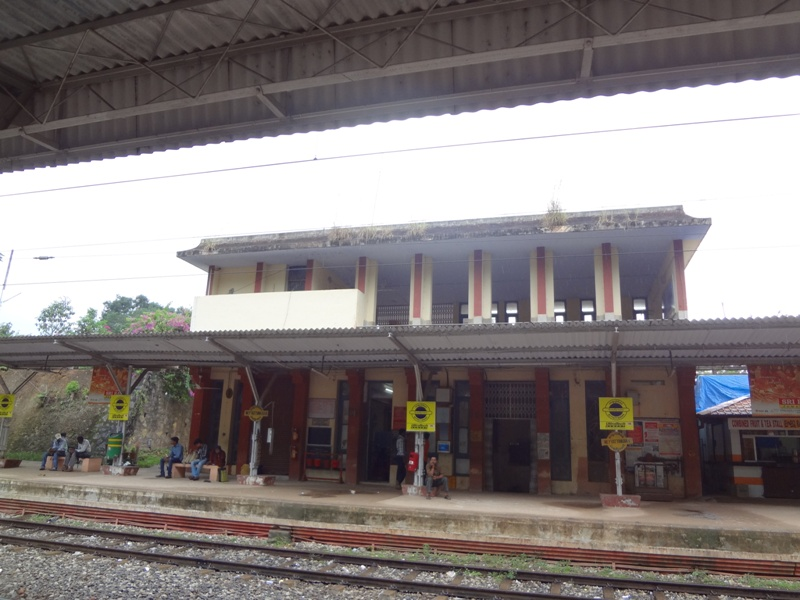
- Neyyattinkara station building

General information
- Location: Thiruvananthapuram, Kerala; India
- Coordinates: 8.4105°N 77.081°E
- Elevation: 22 m (72 ft)
- System: Regional rail and Light rail station
- Line: Thiruvananthapuram–Nagercoil–Kanyakumari line
- Platforms: 2
- Tracks: 2
- Connections: Neyyattinkara KSRTC bus station (opposite); Taxi stand; Trivandrum International Airport (24km)

Construction
- Structure type: Standard (on-ground station)
- Parking: Available
- Accessible: Disabled access

Other information
- Status: Functioning
- Station code: NYY
- Zone(s): Southern Railway
- Division(s): Thiruvananthapuram

Passengers
- Annual 17,54,426 4807/day
Route map
Location
- Location within Kerala Location within India

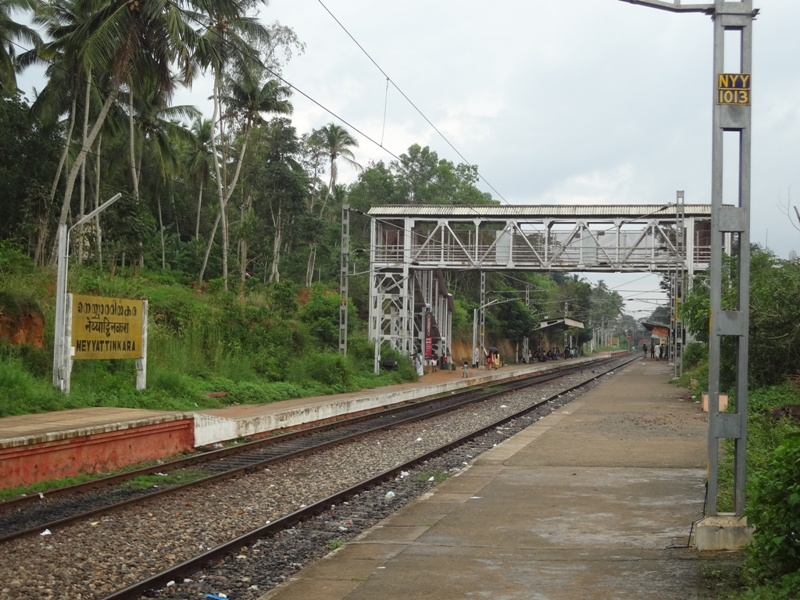
View of Neyyattinkara railway station from Platform 1

Neyyattinkara railway station (station code: NYY) is an NSG–5 category Indian railway station in Thiruvananthapuram railway division of Southern Railway zone. It is a major railway station in Kerala serving the capital Thiruvananthapuram district of Kerala. The station serves as the southern gateway to the capital city Trivandrum. Neyyattinkara railway station is the fourth-busiest after Trivandrum North and sixth most revenue generating railway station in the district managed by the Thiruvananthapuram Division of the Southern Railways. In 2018–19 FY, Neyyattinkara generated Rs 2.32cr profit from 1.7 million passengers.

== Lines ==
The station is on the Thiruvananthapuram–Kanyakumari railway line.

== Connections ==
Thiruvananthapuram Central is 18 kilometres (11 mi) from here. The Neyyattinkara KSRTC Bus Station is 1.7 kilometres (1.1 mi) away from the station.

== Services ==
Trains passing by the Neyyattinkara railway station connects to Thiruvananthapuram, Kollam, Punalur, Ernakulam, Guruvayur, Mangalore, Chennai, Mumbai, Bangalore, Kanyakumari, Nagercoil, Madurai, Trichy, etc.

== See also ==
- Neyyattinkara
- Thiruvananthapuram Central
- Transport in Thiruvananthapuram
- Karunagappalli railway station
