= Neyyattinkara =

Suburb of Thiruvananthapuram, Kerala, India

- Municipal Town
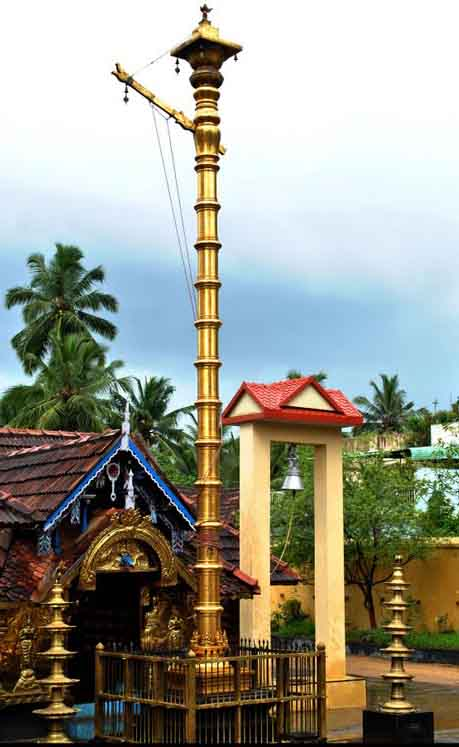
- Neyyattinkara Temple

- Location within Kerala Location within India
- Coordinates: 8.4°N 77.08°E
- Country: India
- State: Kerala
- District: Thiruvananthapuram

Government
  - Body: Neyyattinkara Municipality (Rating: First Grade since 2014) or Neyyattinkara Municipal Council (NMC)
  - Chairperson: P K Rajmohan, (CPI(M) party)
  - Member of the Legislative Assembly (India): Sri K. Ansalan, (Communist Party of India(Marxist))
  - Member of Parliament: Shashi Tharoor, (Indian National Congress party, Re-elected in 2024 Indian general election)

Area
  - Total: 29.5 km^{2} (11.4 sq mi)
- Elevation: 26 m (85 ft)

Population (2011)
  - Total: 70,850
  - Density: 2,400/km^{2} (6,220/sq mi)

Languages
  - Official: Malayalam, English
- Time zone: UTC+5:30 (IST)
- PIN: 695 121
- Telephone code: 91 (0)471 XXX XXXX
- Vehicle registration: KL-20
- Sex ratio: 1064
- Literacy: 98.72%
- Climate: Am/Aw (Köppen)
- Precipitation: 1,700 millimetres (67 in)
- Avg. annual temperature: 27.2 °C (81.0 °F)
- Avg. summer temperature: 35 °C (95 °F)
- Avg. winter temperature: 24.4 °C (75.9 °F)
- Website: www.neyyattinkaramunicipality.in

Neyyattinkara is a municipal town situated 18 km south east of Thiruvananthapuram city and about 30 km south of Nedumangad in Thiruvananthapuram district, Kerala, India. It also serves as the administrative headquarters of Neyyattinkara taluk. Nestled along the banks of the Neyyar River, one of the district's principal rivers, the town derives its name from its location, with 'Neyyatinkara' in Malayalam translating to 'the shore of the river Neyyar.' Notably, the Vizhinjam International Seaport Thiruvananthapuram is situated within Neyyattinkara taluk."

== Etymology ==
The town derives its name from its location, with 'Neyyatinkara' in Malayalam translating to 'the banks of the river Neyyar.'

== Administration ==
The town comes under the purview of Neyyattinkara Municipality. It also comes under the Neyyatinkara Assembly Constituency which inturn comes under the Thiruvananthapuram Lok Sabha Constituency. The town is mostly residential, with many government and service sector establishments. The standard and generally accepted abbreviations of Neyyattinkara are NTA (used by general public) or NYY (used by Indian railway) and NTKA used by Kerala State Electricity Board.

== History ==
Cave pictures, probably by Neolithic people, are found in Pandavanpara, located on the northeast side of Neyyattinkara towards the Karakonam route. This famous cave falls under Perumkadavila panchayat. The name of this portion of land, before Marthanda Varma became the ruler of Travancore, was 'Thenganad'.

== Geography ==
Neyyattinkara is located at 8.4°N 77.08°E. It has an average elevation of 26 metres (85 feet). The town is situated on the Neyyar River side, one of the principal rivers in Thiruvananthapuram district. The river flows to the south part of the town. Water Supply for the town and the adjacent places is obtained from this river. Topography of the town is rather uneven, with higher areas in the downtown. Nearby the town is the hillock Aruvippuram. The Western Ghats form a scenic backdrop to the town. The town is sandwiched between the Western Ghats and the Arabian Sea. The nearby sea shore is just 10 km. away in west, and seven kilometres to the east can take you to the mammoth hillocks of Western Ghats. The geology is said to be typical of the Kerala soil - the Laterite and red soil. The town can still boast of a good green cover in residential and non-residential areas.

== Veerasmrithi (War Memorial-Neyyattinkara) ==
A depiction on the Veera Smrithi states "From this village 174 men went to the great war 1914 to 1919". It is located near Village Office, Neyyattinkara.

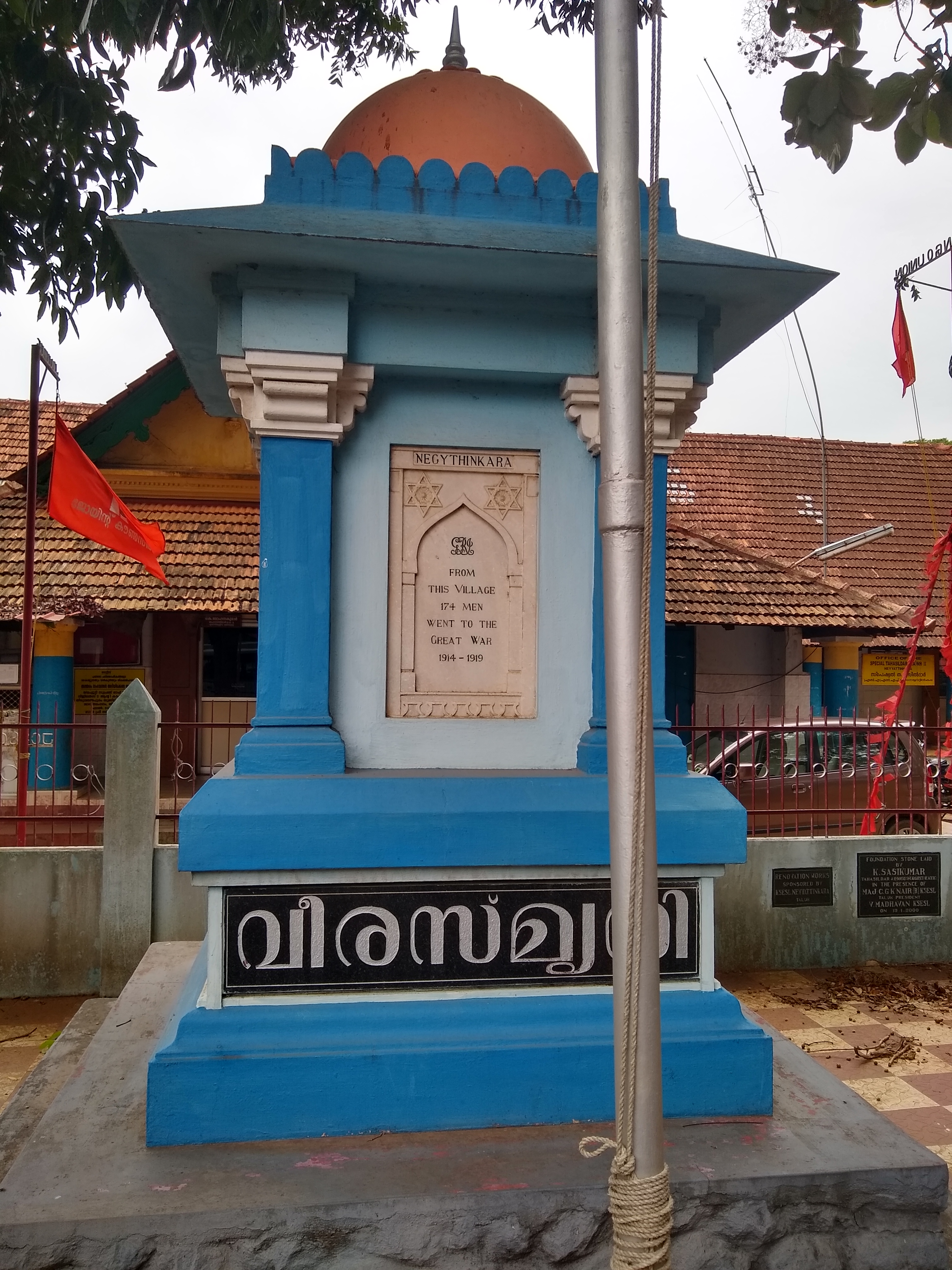
Neyyattinkara Veerasmrithi

== Religious centres ==
The Neyyattinkara Sree Krishna Swamy Temple is situated in the centre of the town and is an important pilgrimage centre. The annual festival is an important attraction for people in the district.

Besides the religious significance, the temple holds a special place in Travancore history. Legend has it that the then Crown Prince Marthanda Marthanda Varma was redirected by Anandapadmanabhan Thambi dressed up as mad chaannaan (everyone believed that he was dead; as spread by enemies) to a Jackfruit tree near the temple while he was being chased by his enemies. The prince hid within the tree cavity and escaped almost certain death. He was convinced the chaannan was none other than Lord Sri Krishna himself. Gratefully, he named the tree as Ammachi Plavu (Mother Tree) and placed it under royal protection.

Aruvippuram (7 km from Neyyattinkara town), the holy land of Sree Narayana Guru is an important pilgrim centre situated in [[Perumkadavilla]] Grama panchayat.Aruvippuram is historically significant as the site where Sree Narayana Guru, in 1888, consecrated a Shiva idol, boldly proclaiming it to be an Ezhava Siva. This act was a philosophical and social watershed that affirmed the spiritual rights of marginalized communities, challenged centuries of caste-based exclusion, and inspired transformative movements for social equality in Kerala.

Parassala Assemblies of God Church is one of the Largest Pentecostal churches in Kerala. The church is known as Jehovah Nissi AG church.

Neyyattinkara CSI church founded in 1822, an oldest Church of Anglican Communion, is one of the main attractions of Neyyatiinkara Town. On 14 June 1996 Pope John Paul II by the Bull "Ad Aptius Provehendum" erected the Kamukincode Valiyapalli St. Mary's Church (founded in 1847), Neyyattinkara Town Latin Catholic Diocese of Neyyattinkara bifurcated from the Diocese of Trivandrum and by the announcement of Archbishop Soosa Pakiam and ordination by Cardinal Joseph Tomko on 1 November 1996, appointed Rt. Rev. Dr. Vincent Samuel as its first Bishop. Bishop Samuel took Ecclesiastical possession of the diocese on 5 November 1996. Diocese of Neyyattinkara consists of three Taluks viz. Neyyattinkara, Kattakada and Nedumangadu. The Bishop's House is located in Aralummoodu, Neyyattinkara. St. Therese's Convent G.H.S.S. Neyyattinkara is one of the individual management educational institutions that comes under the purview of this diocese. The two Kurisumala (Holy Cross Hills) Pilgrim Centres near Neyyattinkara, viz., Bonacaud Kurishumala (Bonacaud Holy Cross Hills) and Vellarada Kurishumala (Vellarada Holy Cross Hills) also come under the purview of Latin Catholic Diocese of Neyyattinkara. Our Lady of Assumption Church Vlathankara (swargaropithamatha), St Sebastian's Forane Pilgrim Church Balaramapuram, St. Antony's Church (Kochupalli), Vellarada Kurishumala and Bonacadu Kurishumala are the five major pilgrim centres of the Diocese of Neyyattinkara.

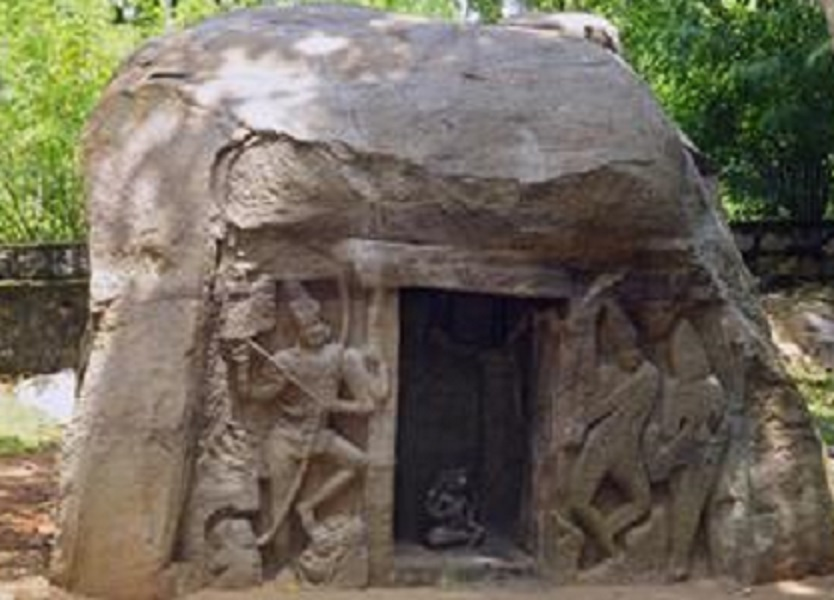
Unfinished Cave Temple in Vizhinjam (South-West side of NTA Town, constructed by the rulers of the Ay kingdom (857-885 AD))

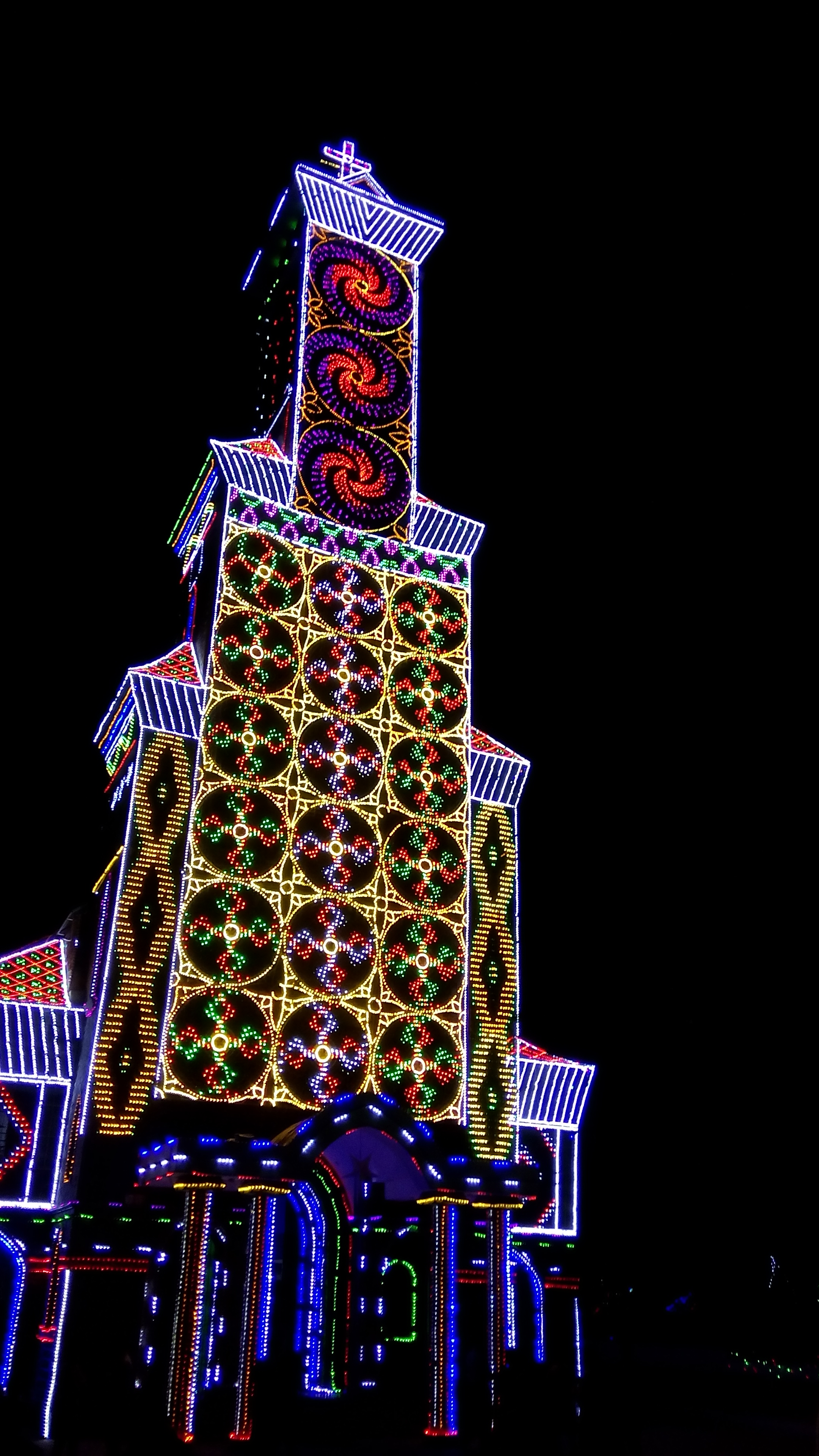
Amaravila CSI Church illuminated

== Demographics ==
Population of Neyyattinkara Town (Municipal Area) as on 1991-03-01 was 30,419. However, the population rose to 69,467 on 2001-03-01 and rose again to 70,850 on 2011-03-01., which grades it under Class-II town. Most of the urban population lies within the municipality area which is densely occupied. There is often an inflow of people into the town and nearby areas, for the ease of access to a plethora of institutions, which provide various services. Convent Road is one of the most densely occupied regions in the town, with a number of educational institutions like St. Thereses' Convent GHSS, St. Tresa of Avila ICSE School, Sree Vidyaadhiraja HSS, and a lot more. Out pockets of the town include Vazhuthoor, Perumpazhuthoor, Amaravila, Aralummood, etc.

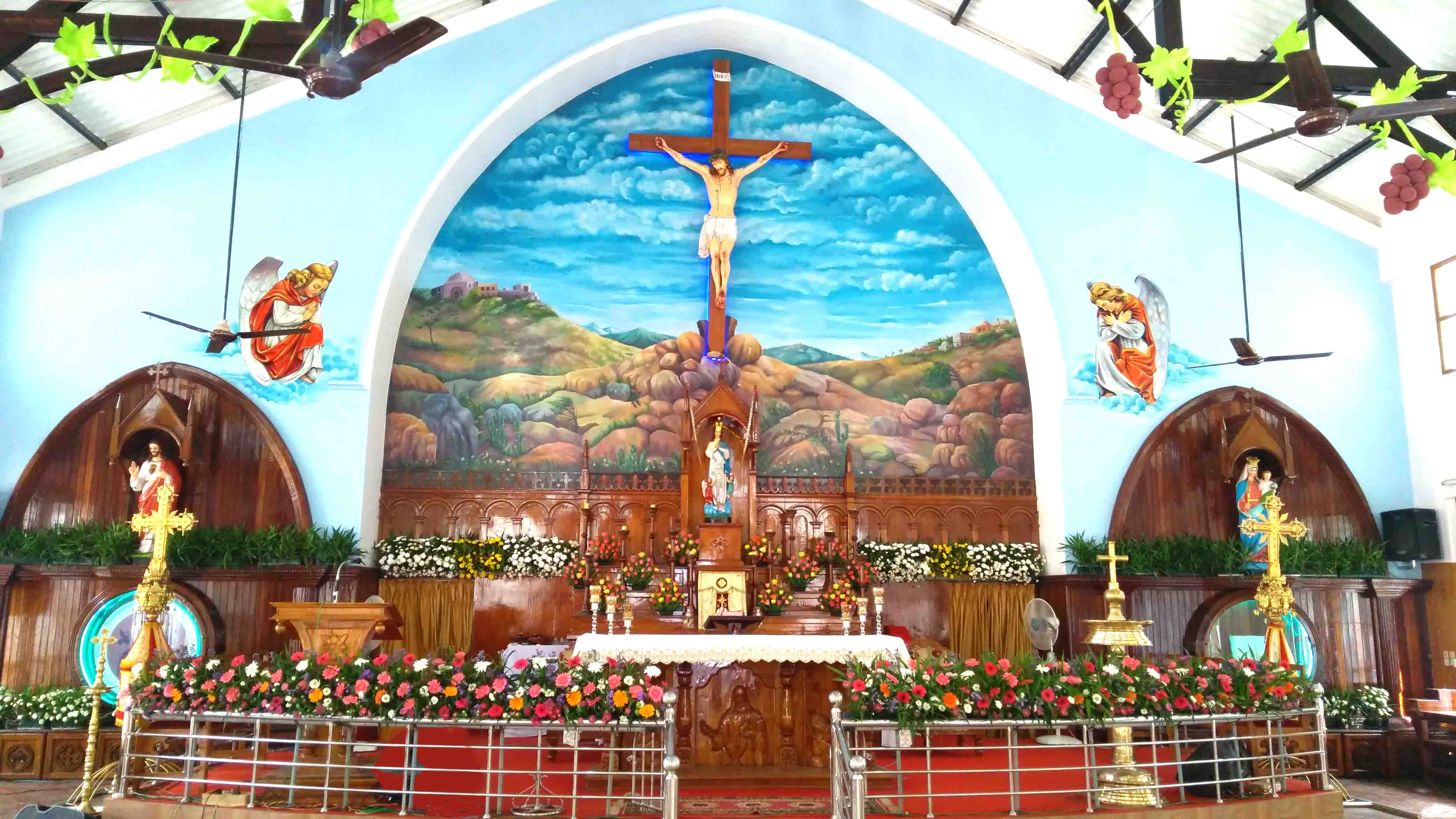
Ancient Marian pilgrim centre (16th Cent), at Vlathankara, the small village in the south part of Kerala, dedicated to Our Lady Of Assumption (Swargaropithamatha), belongs to the Latin Diocese of Neyyattinkara.

== Notable people ==
• Akhil p Nair, a silent observer

• Swadeshabhimani Ramakrishna, Journalist

• C. Krishnan Nair, Indian Independence activist, Gandhian

• Jagadish, Malayalam actor

• Biju Sopanam, Comedy Artist

• Neyyattinkara Vasudevan, Neyyattinkara Mohanachandran (Musicians)

• Abhishek Nayar, Indian cricketer

• Sanju Samson, Indian cricketer

• G. Ramachandran, Social reformer

• P. Gopinathan Nair

• V Madhusoodanan Nair, Malayalam poet.

== Educational institutions ==
The town has a number of secondary, and higher secondary educational institutions, plus a number of Polytechnics, and Engineering Colleges in the vicinity. The Govt. HSS in the town is one of the oldest schools in the entire state. It was established long before in the 1890s. It has churned out a number of proficient people, who have excelled in every field.

=== List of colleges ===
1. NIMS Dental College, Aralumoodu, Neyyattinkara
2. Technology Management Corridor (TMC), Near Sub-jail, Chemparathivila, NTA [Institute of Human Resource Development (IHRD), Government of Kerala]
3. College of Applied Science, Dhanuvachapuram (5 km from Town) (Institute of Human Resource Development (IHRD), Government of Kerala)
4. Ezhuthachan College of Pharmaceutical Sciences, Marayamuttom
5. VTM NSS college, Dhanuvachapuram (5 km from Town)
6. K N M Government Arts & Science College, Kanjiramkulam (9 km from Town)
7. Government Arts & Science College, Kulathoor
8. University Institute of Technology, Neyyattinkara Centre (2 km from Town)
9. Government Polytechnic College, Perumpazhuthoor (3 km from Town)
10. Regional Institute of Aviation, Pravachambalam (6 km from Town)
11. CSI College of Education, Parasala
12. PRS College of Engineering and Technology, Paliyode
13. Sree Krishna College of Pharmacy & Research Centre, Parassala
14. Emmanuel College of Arts and Science Vazhichal
15. White Memorial College of Arts and Science for Women, Panachammoodu, Vellarada.
16. santhom malankara arts and science college.

=== List of schools ===
1. St.Teresa's Convent GHSS, Convent Road, Neyyattinkara:
2. Government Higher Secondary School, Near Govt. Hospital Jn (State Syllabus - English / Malayalam Medium)
3. Government Girls' Higher Secondary School, Govt. Hospital Road (State Syllabus - English / Malayalam Medium)
4. Sree Vidyadhiraja Vidya Nilayam Higher Secondary School, Convent Road (English Medium)
5. Viswabharathy Public School, Kanyakumari Road (CBSE Syllabus, English Medium)
6. Junior Basic School (JBS), Neyyattinkara - State Syllabus, Malayalam Medium (Near Municipality & Fire Station buildings)
7. St. Philip English Medium High School, T B Junction
8. LMS HSS Amaravila, Near Amaravila Church
9. Dr. G.R Public School, Ooruttukaala
10. St. Mary’s High School., Kamukincode
11. Government High School, Perumpazhuthoor- 3 km from Town
12. M.V Higher Secondary School, Arumanoor
13. Government Higher Secondary School - Marayamuttom in Perumkadavila Panchayat
14. Leo XIII Higher Secondary School, Pulluvila
15. New Higher Secondary School, Nellimoodu
16. St. Chrysostom's G.H.S.S Nellimoodu
17. PKS Higher Secondary School, Kanjiramkulam
18. Government High School, Kanjiramkulam
19. Javahar Central School, Kanjiramkulam
20. Government High School, Anavoor
21. Government Higher Secondary School, Keezharoor
22. St. Helen's Girls' Higher Secondary School, Lourdupuram
23. Srisankara Centralschool, Poozhikunnu, Venkadampu

== Politics ==
Neyyattinkara taluk is part of Thiruvananthapuram (Lok Sabha constituency) except kattakada assembly constituency which is part of Attingal (Lok Sabha constituency).

Neyyattinkara taluk includes 4 assembly constituencies (Kattakkada, Neyyattinkara, Parassala, Kovalam) in the Kerala Legislative Assembly. In early 2012, Neyyattinkara constituency attracted statewide attention, as it witnessed a much fiercely contested by-elections that Kerala Politics have ever seen caused by the resignation of the incumbent MLA R. Selvaraj of the CPI(M) party. The tri-cornered contest was between O. Rajagopal of BJP, F. Lawrence of CPI(M) and Selvaraj (Now, of INC), with Selvaraj emerging as the winner finally. He was defeated in 2016, losing to the CPI(M) candidate by more than 9000 votes!

Current MP: Dr. Shashi Tharoor (Indian National Congress party, re-elected as MP on 20 May 2024)

Neyyattinkara MLA: N. Sakthan, (Indian National Congress party) won the 2026 election winning 47.02 % of votes cast.

Parassala MLA: C.K. Hareendran, (CPI(M) party) won the 2026 election winning 48.16 % of votes cast.

Kovalam MLA: M Vincent, (Indian National Congress party) won the 2024 election winning 47.06 % of votes cast.

Neyyattinkara Municipality led by LDF, PK Rajmohan CPI(M) elected as chairperson and Vice chairperson.

== Industry ==
The major factory in the town is the Kerala Automobiles Limited (KAL) at Aralummoodu. It manufactures three-wheelers, including vehicle designs for cargo transport. The company export its three-wheelers to markets in the ASEAN region.

Neyyattinkara and the neighbouring areas has many cottage industries and handloom. The Balaramapuram Handloom Industry is known worldwide for its fine hosiery. There is a major handloom cloth manufacturing unit at Manchavilakam near Neyyattinkara.

== Transport ==
Neyyattinkara has a wide range of transportation facilities by road, rail or air.

=== By bus ===
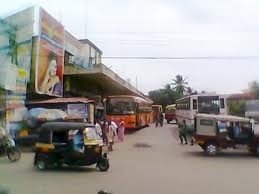
Bus Stand (KSRTC), Neyyattinkara

Neyyattinkara is well connected to all parts of the city through regular bus services operated by Kerala State Road Transport Corporation which includes Ananthapuri city fast passenger, non AC low floor, AC low floor, fast passenger, super fast passenger, city radial services etc. Neyyattinkara KSRTC Bus Depot is the largest in the taluk and operates a wide array of services. It include long-distance services to Guruvayoor, Thrissur, Kozhikode, Chakkulath Kaavu, Kollam, Ernakulam, Kanniyakumari, etc. A/C Low Floor buses frequently ply along the Neyyattinkara-East Fort-Medical College-Kazhakkuttam route. There is also 24*7 bus service between Trivandrum to Nagarcoil and vice versa via Neyyattinkara operated by both Kerala State Road Transport Corporation and Tamil Nadu State Transport Corporation

=== By air ===
The nearest airport is Thiruvananthapuram International Airport (22 km).

=== By train ===
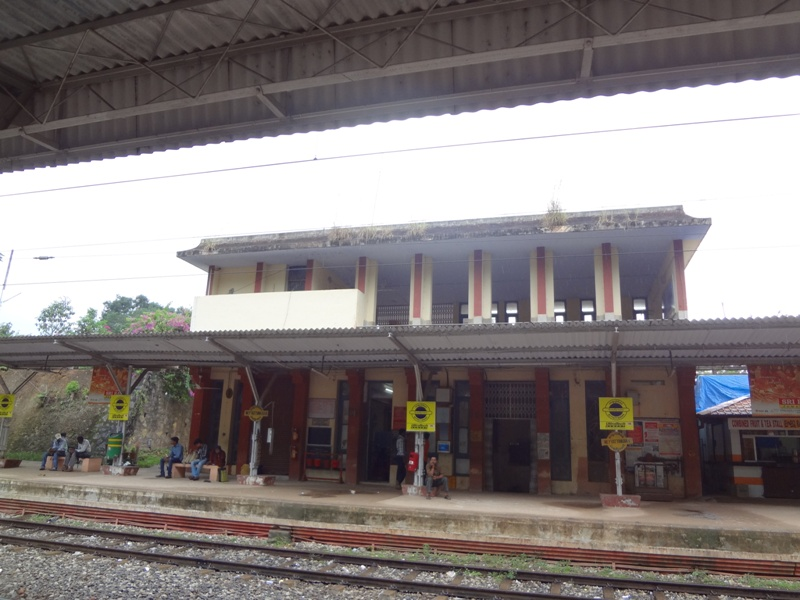
South side view of Neyyattinkara railway station

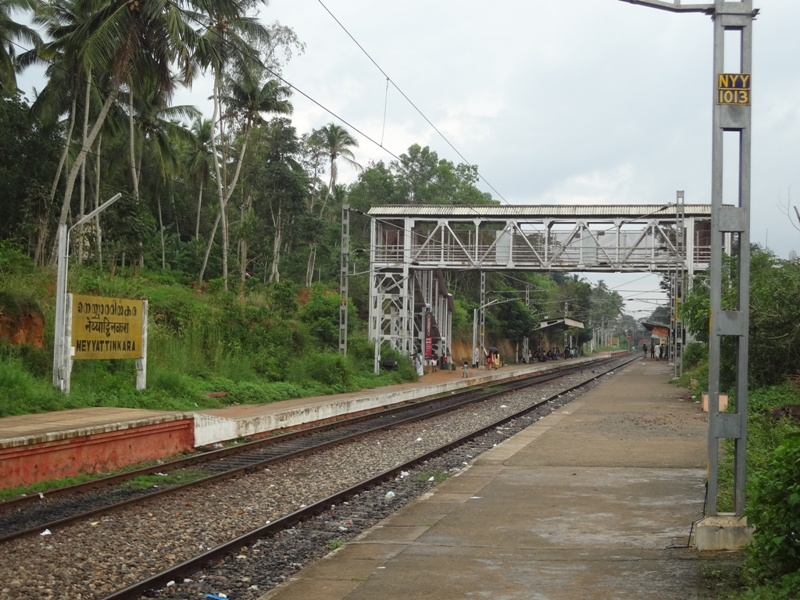
East side view of Neyyattinkara railway station

Neyyattinkara Railway Station is located on the Mangalore- Thiruvananthapuram - Kanyakumari Railway line. Neyyattinkara railway station code is 'NYY'. Except Super Fast & weekly Trains, all other daily express trains and passenger trains through this route stops here. Thus the town is connected by major cities in India, including Chennai, Bangalore, Mumbai, Kolkata, Mangalore, Pune, Kochi, Kanyakumari etc....

The Thiruvananthapuram Central railway station is about (18 km) from the town. Express trains will take 15 minutes to reach Thiruvananthapuram from Neyyattinkara town, however, passenger / Shuttle trains will take 30 minutes (since these trains have stops at Balaramapuram and Nemom in between Neyyattinkara and Thiruvananthapuram).

== Climate ==
Köppen-Geiger climate classification system classifies it climate as tropical wet and dry (Aw).

Neyyattinkara has heavy rains during June–August due to the southwest monsoon. Winter starts from December and continues till February. In summer, the temperature rises to a maximum of 32 °C (90 °F) and 31 °C (88 °F) in the winters. Record high temperature in neighbouring Thiruvananthapuram is 39 °C (102 °F). Annual average rainfall is 3,100 mm (120 in).

Climate data for Neyyattinkara
Month	Jan	Feb	Mar	Apr	May	Jun	Jul	Aug	Sep	Oct	Nov	Dec	Year
Mean daily maximum °C (°F)	29.9 (85.8)	30.7 (87.3)	31.7 (89.1)	31.8 (89.2)	31.3 (88.3)	29.1 (84.4)	28.6 (83.5)	28.9 (84.0)	29.3 (84.7)	29.3 (84.7)	29.1 (84.4)	29.3 (84.7)	29.9 (85.8)
Daily mean °C (°F)	26.1 (79.0)	26.9 (80.4)	28.1 (82.6)	28.6 (83.5)	28.2 (82.8)	26.5 (79.7)	25.9 (78.6)	26.2 (79.2)	26.5 (79.7)	26.5 (79.7)	26.2 (79.2)	26 (79)	26.8 (80.3)
Mean daily minimum °C (°F)	22.4 (72.3)	23.2 (73.8)	24.5 (76.1)	25.4 (77.7)	25.2 (77.4)	23.9 (75.0)	23.3 (73.9)	23.5 (74.3)	23.7 (74.7)	23.7 (74.7)	23.4 (74.1)	22.7 (72.9)	23.7 (74.7)
Average precipitation mm (inches)	19 (0.7)	27 (1.1)	52 (2.0)	144 (5.7)	248 (9.8)	457 (18.0)	336 (13.2)	222 (8.7)	201 (7.9)	290 (11.4)	205 (8.1)	55 (2.2)	2,256 (88.8)
Average rainy days	1	2	3	8	10	19	17	14	11	12	8	3	108
Mean daily sunshine hours	9	9	8	8	7	5	5	6	6	6	6	7	7
Source 1: Climate-Data.org
Source 2: Weatherbase Trivandrum, India for sunshine and rainy days

== See also ==
- Neyyattinkara Sree Krishna Swami Temple
- Upper cloth revolt
- Neyyattinkara Railway Station
- Neyyattinkara (tehsil)
- Vizhinjam
- Vizhinjam International Seaport Thiruvananthapuram
- Thiruvananthapuram
- Amaravila
- Kanjiramkulam
- Municipalities of Kerala
- Perumpazhuthoor
- Panachamoodu
