= Chendamangalam saree =

Type of sari clothing from India

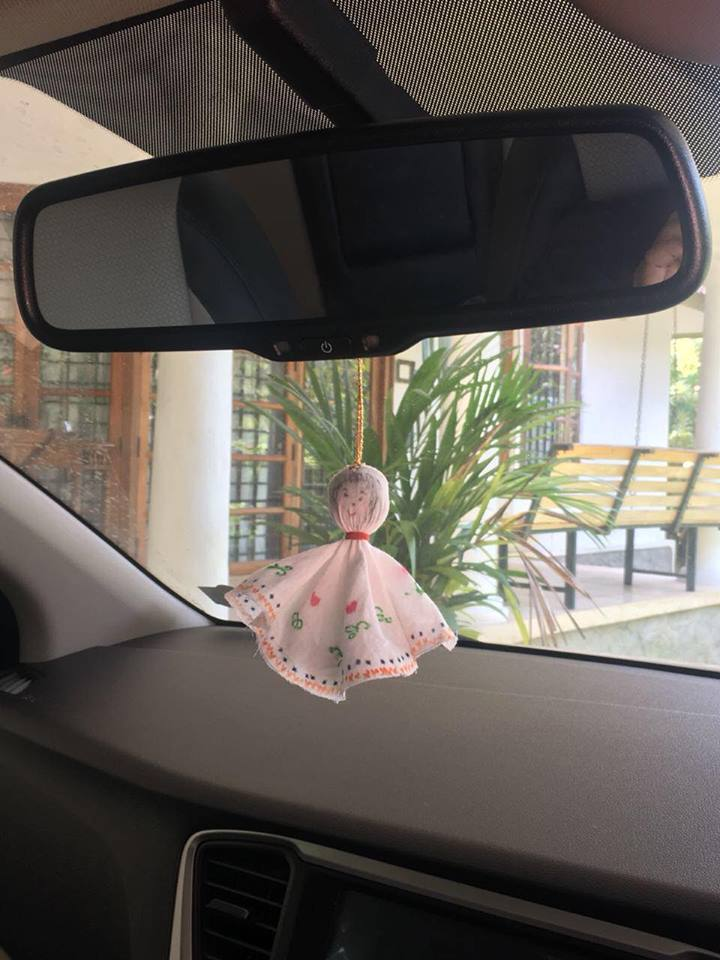
Chekutty dolls

Chendamangalam Saree is a traditional hand woven cotton sari from Chendamangalam, Ernakulam district of Kerala. This saree is part of the Chendamangalam Handloom tradition of Kerala.

== History ==
This weaving tradition was started by Devanga Chettiar community who were settled at Chendamangalam in the 16th century for Paliath Achan family, the hereditary Prime minister and Raja of the Paliam swaroopam under the Kingdom of Cochin. They started by weaving fine muslin dhotis that could pass ringtest. The handloom tradition flourished into sarees and other fabrics under the nobles of Cochin. The weaving waned by early 20th century as a result of diminishing of patronage. However, through Chendamangalam Handloom Co-operative Society formed in 1954 and The Kerala Co-operative Society Act of 1969 the handloom witnessed revival.

The weavers faced huge losses due to 2018 Kerala floods in the region. The looms regained its glory through yeoman efforts of Save The Loom initiative by veteran fashion industry professional Ramesh Menon In 2021 May there was a new collection made for women in law in order to commemorate birth anniversary of first women judge of India Anna Chandy.

== Features ==
It is one among the four famous weaving traditions existing in Kerala today. The saree is distinguished by its puliyilakara (tamarind leaf border), a thin black line that runs abreast with the sari's selvedge. It also has extra-weft chuttikara and stripes and checks of varying width. The saree is a typical Kerala sari and has Kasavu used in it. This sarees are made with high thread count in the range of 80 - 120 and needs two to four days of manual labour.

== GI tag ==
In 2010, the Government of Kerala applied for Geographical Indication for Chendamangalam Dhoties, Sarees/Set Mundu. The Government of India recognized it as a Geographical indication officially since the year 2011.

== See also ==
- Kuthampully Saree
- Kasaragod Saree
