= Balaramapuram handlooms =

Handlooms of Kerala

Balaramapuram handlooms are part of a centuries-old weaving tradition in Thiruvananthapuram. Balaramapuram handloom is a part of Thiruvananthapuram's fashion and textile heritage. The weaving tradition dates back to the 18th century during the reign of Avittom Thirunal Balarama Varma of Travancore. These handlooms are known for their use of traditional throw-shuttle pit looms, where the weavers manually operate the loom by foot while seated in a pit. The fabrics are woven using high-quality cotton yarn, often hand-spun, and are notable for their fine texture, durability, and simplicity. A distinctive feature is the kasavu border an elegant golden zari design that adorns traditional garments like mundu, veshti, and sarees. It is known as kasavu Mundu and kasavu saree.

Balaramapuram handlooms are widely regarded for their minimalist design aesthetic, absence of synthetic dyes, and unstitched form that reflects Kerala's cultural heritage. Each piece is handcrafted with meticulous attention to detail, ensuring uniformity and a smooth finish. The technique has remained largely unchanged over generations, preserving its authenticity and craftsmanship. In recent years, the craft has gained international attention; notably, in 2021, a designer outfit incorporating Balaramapuram handloom fabric was featured at a pre-Oscars red carpet event, highlighting the textile's relevance in contemporary global fashion.

== Weaving ==
Weavers in Balaramapuram continue to use traditional throw-shuttle pit looms for the production of cotton fabrics incorporating pure zari. These methods exclude the use of advanced weaving devices such as the Dobby, Jacquard, and Jala. Designs are produced through the use of extra warp and weft threads, resulting in patterns that are identical on both the front and back of the fabric.

The tools and techniques involved in the weaving process have remained largely unchanged over time. The variety known as "Pudava and Kavani" a veshti and upper cloth made with zari continues to be used as a customary bridal gift in the region. The traditional designs, often made using zari or colored threads, maintain a consistent level of appeal among consumers, including those in urban and international markets.

== See also ==
- Balaramapuram
- Kerala sari
- Kasavu
- Kasaragod saree
