= Chattayum mundum =

Traditional Christian attire in Kerala

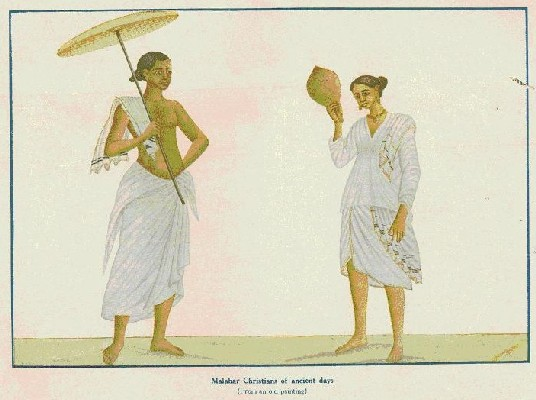
Nasranis or Syrian Christians of Kerala wearing mundu (from an old painting). Photo published in the Cochin Government Royal War Efforts Souvenir in 1938.

Chattayum mundum (Malayalam: ചട്ടയും മുണ്ടും) is a traditional attire used by the Syrian Christian women of Kerala, India.

== Description ==
The Chattayum mundum is a traditional two-piece cotton attire consisting of the chatta and the mundu, worn by Saint Thomas Christian women. The attire ordinarily has no decorations on it. Sometimes a kavani is worn along with it.

=== Chatta ===
The chatta (Malayalam: ചട്ട) is the seamless upper garment of the traditional attire and is typically white in colour. It resembles a jacket or a blouse with either full or half sleeves. Unlike conventional blouses, it does not have front or back openings. Instead, it features a distinctive cut-out neckline consisting of a semicircular opening at the back that extends into a V-shaped opening at the front. The neckline, sleeve edges, and lower hem are finished with neatly sewn hems. It is of Judean origin.

=== Mundu ===
The mundu (Malayalam: മുണ്ട്) is a long white lower garment that is wrapped around the waist and reaches to the ankles, typically measuring about seven yards in length and one and a quarter yards in width. A distinctive feature of the garment is a fan-like appendage at the back, known as the njori (Malayalam: ഞൊറി), which is created by gathering and folding one end of the cloth into multiple pleats.

The kachamuri (Malayalam: കച്ചമുറി) is a more elaborate and ceremonial form of the mundu. It is worn on festive occasions or when going out. It traditionally features a narrow jerry bordered edge on the inner side and a broader jerry border on the outer side and at both ends. Historically, Christian brides wore gold jerry-bordered kachamuris adorned with gold detailing, often accompanied by richly ornamented upper garments, traditional gold jewellery, and specially crafted footwear. Maintaining the garment required considerable care, including starching and whitening techniques to preserve its appearance. In earlier times, a customary post-wedding practice involved the bridegroom presenting a new kachamuri to his mother-in-law. This tradition has largely been replaced by the gifting of a sari. The kaccha used for making kachamuris was typically produced as a large roll of white cloth, from which several kachamuris could be made, while the remaining material was often used to create garments such as chattas and mundus.

=== Kavani ===
The kavani (Malayalam: കവണി), also known as a half-sari, is a supplementary garment worn over the chatta and mundu. Generally made of polyester, it consists of an additional piece of cloth draped over the shoulders and bosom, with the centre pleated and secured to the left shoulder using a brooch, often made of gold or gold-finished metal and sometimes adorned with stones. The portion falling behind the body was typically left pleated, while the front section was spread out. Kavanis were frequently embellished with embroidery in white or soft colours like creamish white. The more ornate varieties, characterised by their off-white hue, elaborate jerry borders, and intricate designs, were traditionally produced in Balaramapuram. While adult women commonly wore the kavani as part of formal attire and outdoors, schoolgirls often omitted it and instead carried a short handwoven towel (Malayalam: തോർത്ത്) over their shoulders.

=== Kasavu ===
Traditionally, in the church, the elder women cover themselves with another white cloth with a golden border Kasavu which is worn over the head, covering the head and the shoulders.

== History ==
The white colour of the chattayum mundum is believed to reflect the influence of the traditional white attire historically associated with upper-caste Hindu communities in Kerala. The mundu is generally regarded as being of indigenous South Indian origin, while the njori bears similarities to garments traditionally worn by South Indian Brahmin women beyond the Syrian Christian community of Kerala.

The origin of the chatta remains disputed; however, some scholars have suggested a possible West Asian influence, noting its use among Mappila Muslim and Jewish women of the Malabar region, in contrast to Hindu women. It has been proposed that the garment may represent a modified form of jackets worn by early West Asian traders. Such influences are often linked to the mercantile traditions of Syrian Christians, as well as those of the Jewish and Mappila communities. Unlike the coloured or decorated chatta worn by women of the latter groups, however, Nasrani women traditionally wore white versions of the garment.

Some girls would wear chattayum mundum as young as twelve. During the 1950s, the kunukku was worn with the chattayum mundum by Syrian Christian women as it was deemed fashionable. However, in the 1970s, the wearing of the attire declined as many Syrian Christian women started wearing saris due to the attire's high maintenance. The newer generations of Syrian Christian women prefer wearing churidars that reached in Kerala from North India. Today, it is limited to the older female adherents.

== In art ==
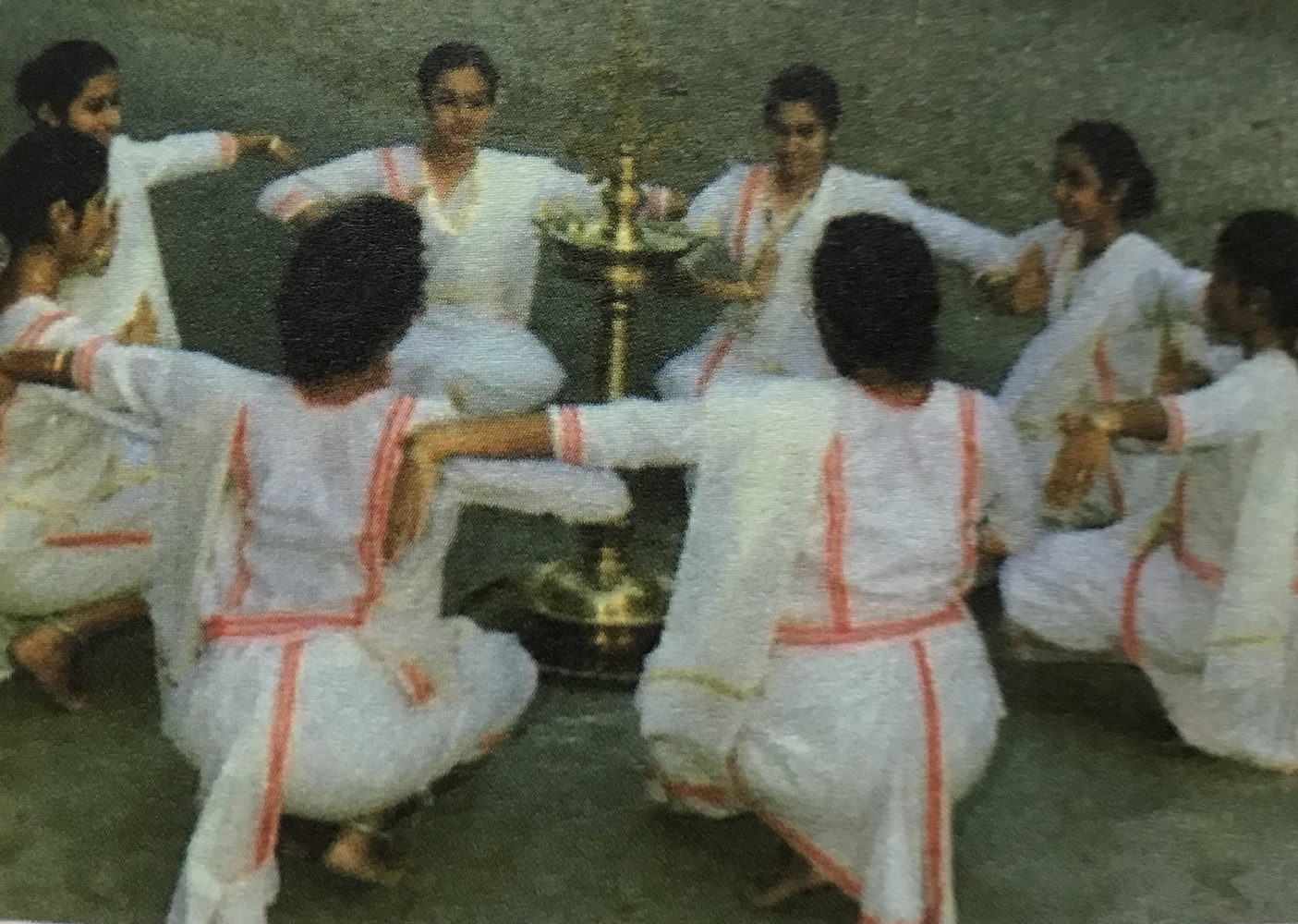
Syrian Christian women performing Margamkali in chattayum mundum

The traditional Syrian Christian dance Margamkali is performed by wearing a slightly shorter variant of the chattayum mundum.

== In popular culture ==
In Arundhati Roy's 1997 Booker Prize winning novel, The God of Small Things, the character Kochu Maria is mentioned wearing the chattayum mundum, even though in the late 1960s, Syrian Christian women started wearing saris, she would only collect saris.

== See also ==
- Saint Thomas Christians
- Margamkali
- Mundu
- Kunukku
