= Kasaragod saree =

Traditional cotton sari

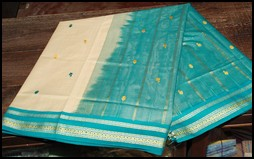
Kasaragod saree

A Kasaragod saree is a type of traditional cotton sari made by weavers belonging to the Saliya community in the Kasaragod district of Kerala. They are handmade and durable. They are distinct from the traditional Kerala sari and exhibit influences of neighboring Karavali styles.

== History ==
This weaving tradition traces its origin to the 18th century. It was started by members of the Saliya community who were migrating from Karavali to Tamil Nadu, and by pathmasaliyas who migrated to the region from the Kingdom of Mysore and formed settlements in the region.

== Significance ==
It is one among the four weaving traditions existing in Kerala. The others are Balaramapuram, Kuthampally and Chendamangalam.

The body of this saree is generally plain or striped using dyed yarns. The borders are hand made using Jacquard or Dobby techniques and hence are very attractive. This sarees are made with high thread count in the range of 60 - 100 and employ vat dye this makes them long lasting. There are recent versions of this sarees with silk blend.

The Kasargod Weavers' Cooperative Production and Sale Society Ltd established in 1938 is currently keeping this tradition alive by producing and marketing this sarees and providing training on weaving. This sarees have a steady patronage since they are suitable for daily use and wearing.

== Geographic Indication ==
In 2009, the Government of Kerala applied for Geographical Indication for Kasaragod sarees. The Government of India recognized it as a Geographical indication officially since the year 2010.

== See also ==
- Kuthampully Saree
