= Thiruvathira =

Hindu festival dedicated to the god Shiva

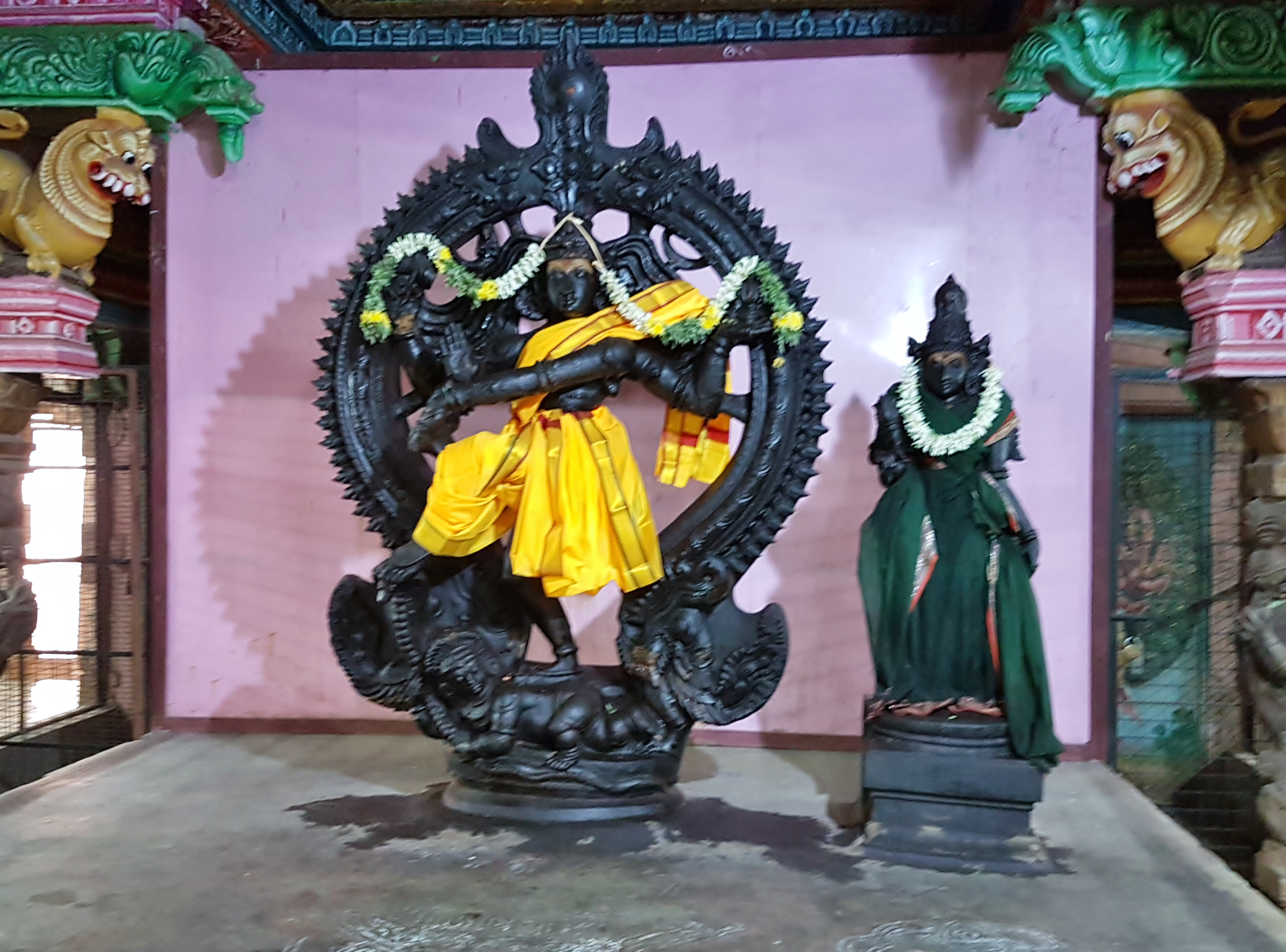
- Shiva as Nataraja and Parvati at Meenakshi Temple, Madurai
- Observed by: Hindus
- Type: Religious
- Significance: Celebrates the cosmic dance, Birthday, and Ardhanarishvara form of Lord Shiva
- Observances: Fasting, Abhisheka, puja, chariot procession, Thiruvasagam, Thiruvathirakali
- Date: Margali
- Duration: 10 days
- Frequency: Annual / Biannual

Thiruvathira (also known as Thiruvathirai or Arudhra Darisanam) is a Hindu festival predominantly observed in the Indian states of Kerala and Tamil Nadu. The term Thiruvathirai (Arudhra) in Tamil translates to "sacred grand wave," symbolizing the cosmic dance of Lord Shiva.

In Tamil Nadu, the festival holds special significance at the Nataraja Temple in Chidambaram, where the annual Arudhra Darshanam is celebrated with grandeur. This event commemorates the celestial dance of Lord Nataraja, an embodiment of Shiva.

In Kerala, the festival is observed during the Malayalam month of Makaram (January–February) under the Thiruvathira asterism (star). A notable celebration occurs at the Mathira Peedika Devi Temple in Kadakkal, Kollam district, administered by the Thiruvithamcore Devaswom Board. Devotees gather here to honour Lord Shiva through rituals, fasting, and traditional performances like Thiruvathira Kali (a circular dance).

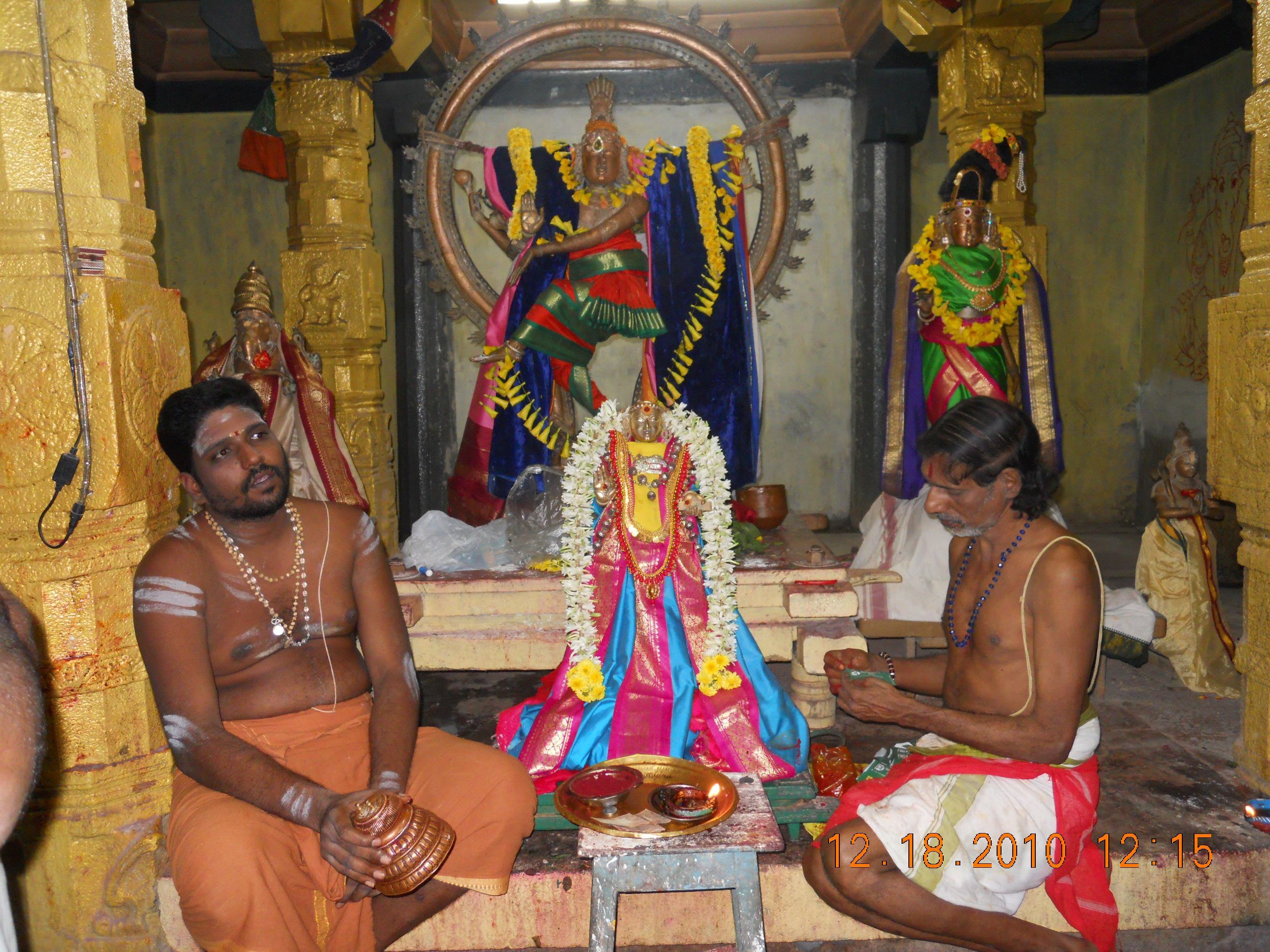
Ekambareswarar Temple (Kanchipuram)

== Arudra Darshan in Chidambaram (Thillai) ==
Thiruvadirai – Arudra Darshan is a prominent Hindu festival celebrated grandly across five sacred sabhas (halls) associated with Lord Nataraja:

1. Kanaka Sabha (Golden Hall) – Chidambaram (Thillai), Tamil Nadu.
2. Velli Sabha (Silver Hall) – Madurai, Tamil Nadu.
3. Ratna Sabha (Ruby Hall) – Tiruvalankadu, Tamil Nadu.
4. Tamra Sabha (Copper Hall) – Tirunelveli, Tamil Nadu.
5. Chitra Sabha (Pictorial Hall) – Kutralam (Courtallam), Tamil Nadu.

In Thillai Chidambaram, a 10-day festival is observed during the Thiruvathirai asterism at the Nataraja Temple. The rituals commence with the Maha Abhishekam (sacred ablution) performed for deities Nataraja and Sivakamasundari in the Raja Sabha during the early hours of the 10th day (around 3:00 AM). This elaborate ritual lasts 3–4 hours. Subsequently, the deities are adorned with Thiruvabaranam (sacred jewels) and worshipped through Rahasiya Puja (esoteric rites). At noon, the Pancha Murthi Thiruveethi Ula (procession of five deities) is held, followed by the Arudra Darisanam, where Nataraja and Sivakami bless devotees with the vision of Shiva's cosmic dance (Ananda Tandava) before returning to the Kanaka Sabha.

According to legend, Shesha (Vishnu's divine serpent) and the sage Vyaghrapada sought to witness Shiva's cosmic dance. They performed intense penance at Chidambaram's Nataraja Temple. Shiva, pleased by their devotion, granted their wish and performed the Ananda Tandava. He also blessed Vyaghrapada with tiger-like legs to collect flowers undisturbed by bees, symbolizing the sage's unwavering dedication.

== Origin ==
Arudra Darshan (Thiruvathirai) is observed on the full moon night of the Tamil month of Margazhi (December–January), which coincides with the longest night of the year. Historical evidence, including stone inscriptions, indicates that the festival has been celebrated for over 1,500 years. In Tamil tradition, Shiva is venerated as Athiraiyan, a name derived from Thiruvathirai (Thiru meaning "sacred" and Athirai signifying "stability" or "greatness").

=== Liturgical practices ===
The festival is marked by the recitation of Tamil hymns of Manikkavasakar's Tiruvacakam, particularly Tiruvempavai and Tiruppallieluchi, in Shiva temples across Tamil Nadu. On the day of Thiruvathirai, idols of Nataraja (Shiva as the cosmic dancer) and his consort Shivagami (Parvati) are ceremoniously paraded outside temple premises in grand processions, a hallmark of Shaivite worship.

=== Literary significance ===
The Tevaram hymns, composed by saints like Sambandar (7th–9th century CE), describe Thiruvathirai celebrations at prominent temples such as Kapaleeshwaram Temple (Mylapore, Chennai). Similarly, Appar (a 7th-century saint) dedicated a pathigam (10-song cycle) in the Tevaram to Thiruvathirai, elaborating on its spiritual and cultural importance. Appar also documented the festival's observance at Tiruvarur Temple in his 4th Tirumurai.

=== Cosmic dance of Shiva ===
Arudra Darshan celebrates Shiva's Ananda Tandava (cosmic dance of bliss), symbolizing the perpetual cycle of creation, protection, destruction, embodiment, and liberation. This dance is believed to manifest as a golden-red flame (Arudhra), with Shiva incarnating as Nataraja on this day to embody divine energy. The festival underscores the belief that this cosmic dance animates all particles in the universe, serving as the source of all cosmic energy.

=== Global observance ===
The festival is observed in most Tamil Shaivite and Nataraja temples. A key ritual involves offering Thiruvathirai Kali (a sweet dish made of rice, jaggery, and lentils) as neivedhyam (divine offering) to Nataraja.

In Sri Lanka, a tradition of its celebration has been elaborated by some Sri Lankan Tamil devotees between the 1960s and the 2000s, at the Karainagar Sivan Kovil. This temple, dedicated to Sundareswarar (Shiva as the handsome lord), is located in the village of Thinnapuram, and promoted by its authorities as the "Eelathu Chithamparam" ("Ceylon's Chidambaram").

=== Notable observations ===
In 2022, Arudra Darshan did not align with the traditional calendar, leading to its dual celebration in 2023—a periodic occurrence due to lunisolar calendar adjustments.

== Significance in Tamil Nadu ==
In Tamil Nadu, particularly the Kongunadu region, Thiruvathirai holds deep cultural and religious significance. Married women observe a ten-day fasting ritual known as Thiruvempavai Nonbu, beginning nine days before Thiruvathirai and concluding on the festival day. During this period, they consume a pre-dawn meal (palliyai unavu) and fast until moonrise, breaking it only after sighting the moon.

=== Culinary traditions ===
A special feast is prepared on Thiruvathirai, featuring:

- Thiruvathirai Kali: A sweet dish made with rice, jaggery, moong dal, coconut, cardamom, and ghee.
- Thiruvathirai Ezhu Curry Koottu: A savory stew incorporating seven vegetables, typically selected from pumpkin, ash gourd, plantain, field beans, sweet potato, colocasia, potato, and eggplant.

=== Temple celebrations ===
The festival is marked by grand processions of Nataraja (Shiva's dancing form) across Shiva temples in Tamil Nadu. At the Chidambaram Nataraja Temple, the rituals include:

- Navaratnam Abhishekam: On the eve of the full moon, the deity is bathed with sacred substances, including a rare ablution using nine gems (navaratnam) such as diamonds, coral, pearls, and emeralds.
- Rathotsavam (Chariot Festival): On the full moon day, Nataraja and Shivagami (Parvati) are paraded in a temple chariot.
- Cosmic Dance Reenactment: The Ananda Tandava (cosmic dance) of Shiva is symbolically performed, drawing thousands of devotees to witness this divine enactment.

The Chidambaram Temple remains the epicenter of Arudra Darshan celebrations, emphasizing Shiva's role as the cosmic dancer who sustains the cycle of creation and dissolution.

== Significance in Kerala ==
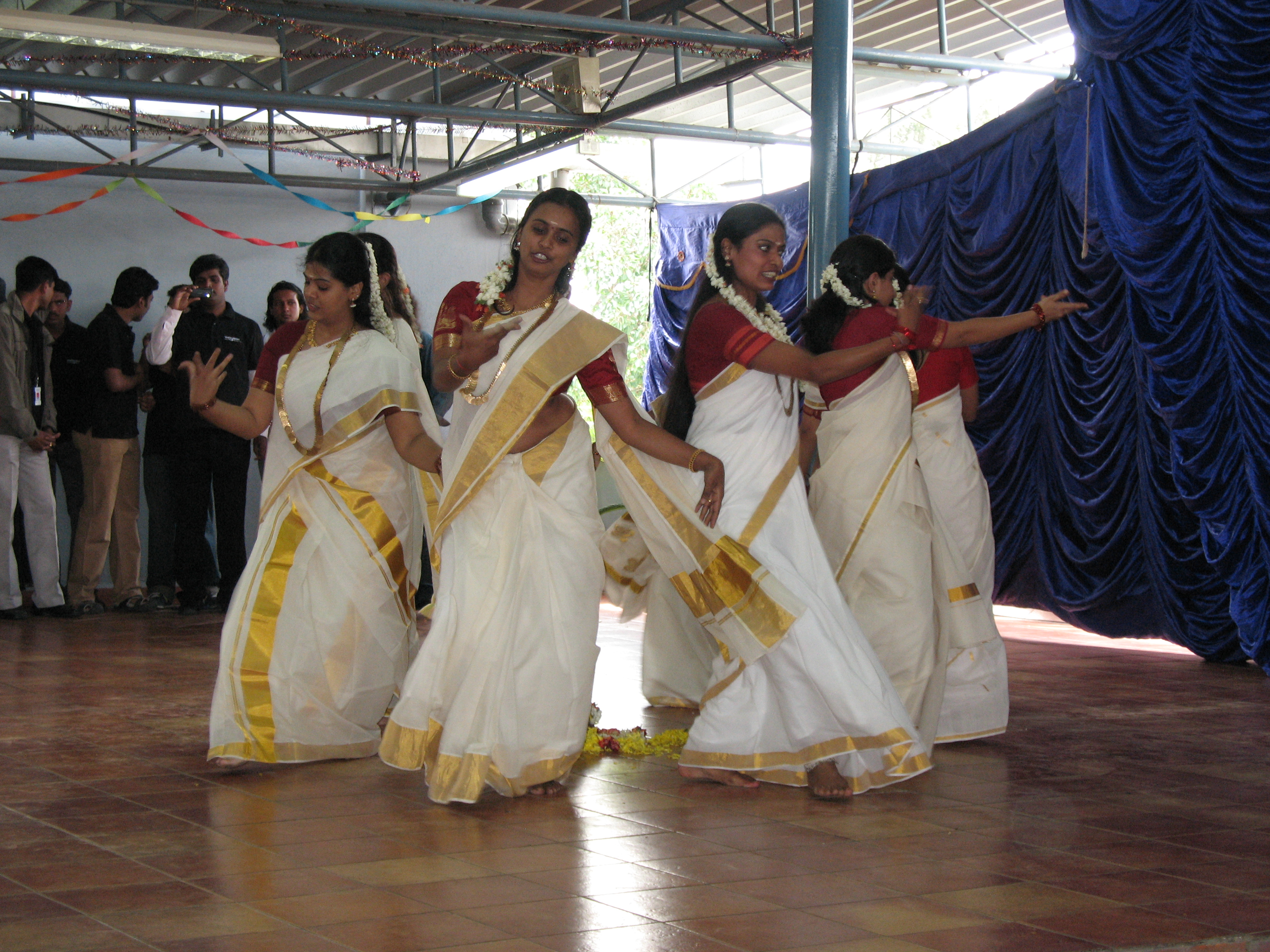
Thiruvathirakali

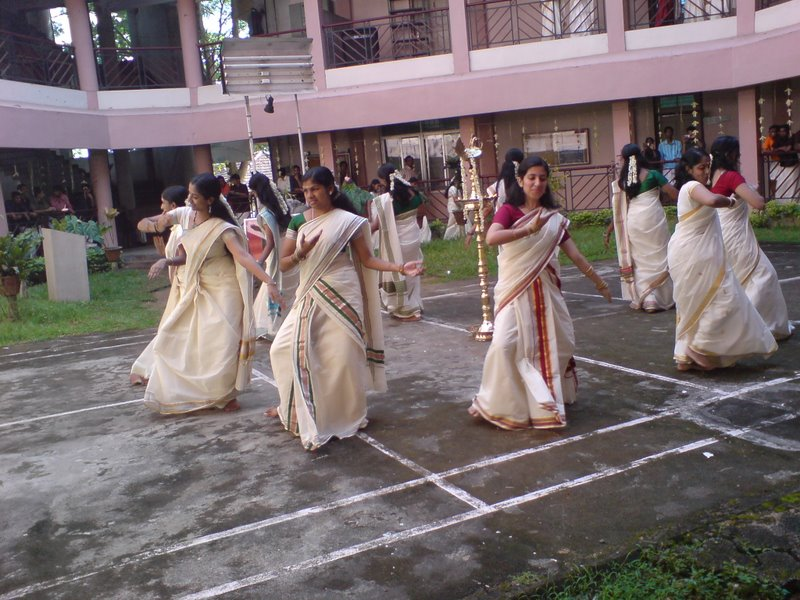
Women performing Thiruvathirakali

Thiruvathira, associated with the nakshatra (star) of Shiva in the Malayalam calendar, holds deep cultural and spiritual importance in Kerala. According to tradition, the festival marks the day Goddess Parvathi united with Shiva as his equal partner (saha-dharma chaarini), symbolizing marital harmony and embodied in the Ardhanarishvara form (half-Shiva, half-Parvati). An alternative belief links the festival to the death of Kamadeva, the god of desire.

=== Observances and rituals ===
Thiruvathira is a major festival in Kerala, celebrated alongside Onam and Vishu. Primarily observed by women, it involves:

- Fasting: Married women fast from the preceding day (Makayiram nakshatra) until Thiruvathira for the well-being of their husbands and families. Unmarried women fast to seek ideal spouses. A newlywed's first Thiruvathira is termed Poothiruvathira.

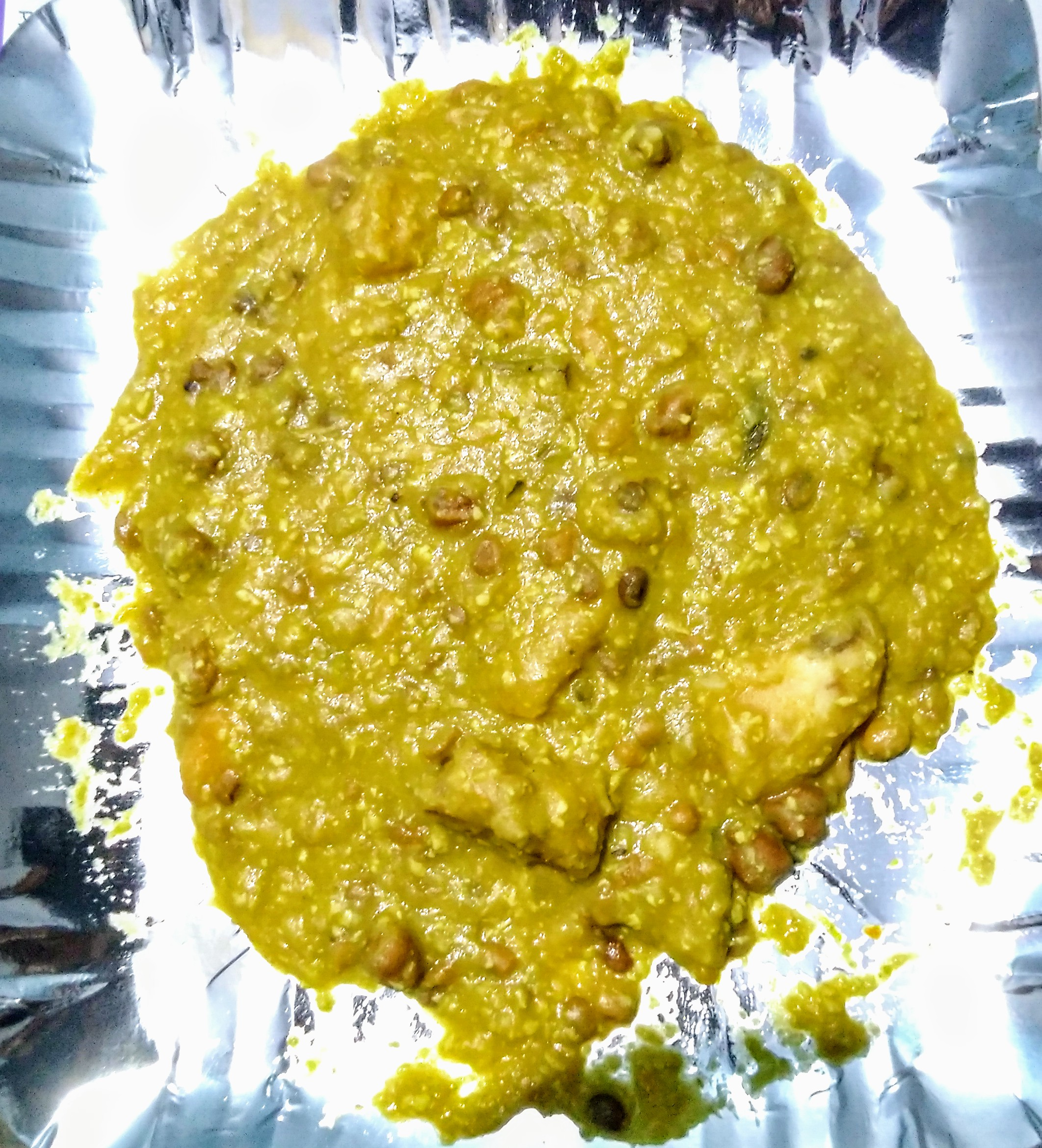
Thiruvathira puzhukku

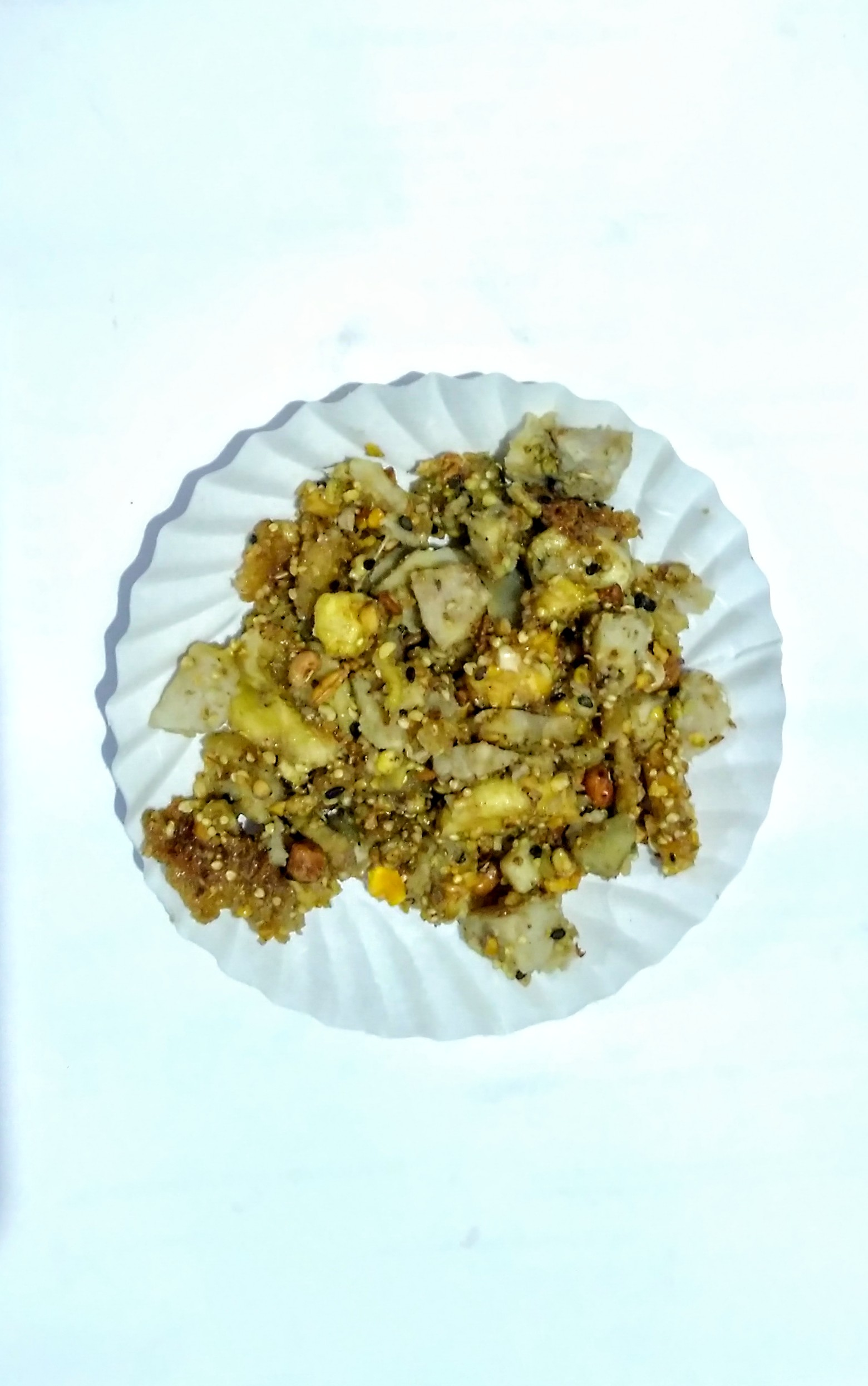
Thiruvathira Ettangadi

- Dietary Customs: The fast excludes rice-based foods. Meals typically include:
  - Cooked broken wheat.
  - Thiruvathira puzhukku: A stew of tuber vegetables (colocasia, yam, Chinese potato, sweet potato) with long beans, raw plantain, and freshly ground coconut paste.
  - Koova payasam: A dessert made with arrowroot powder, jaggery, and coconut milk.

=== Thiruvathirakali dance ===
Thiruvathirakali, a traditional group dance performed by women, is central to the celebrations. Accompanied by Thiruvathira paattu (folk songs narrating Parvati devotion and Shiva's grandeur), dancers move in circular patterns around a nilavilakku (traditional lamp), embodying lasya (graceful, feminine movements). The dance involves rhythmic clapping and pirouettes, reflecting themes of marital bliss and longing.

Historically performed indoors during festivals (as known as Kaikottikali – "clapping dance inside homes"), participants wear traditional mundu (draped cloth) and neriyathu (upper garment), with hair adorned by jasmine garlands. Thiruvathirakali symbolizes joy, marital harmony, and the aspirations of unmarried women, often regarded as Kerala's counterpart to Karva Chauth.

== World records related to Thiruvathira Kali ==
The world's largest Thiruvathirakali performance was organized by Twenty20 Kizhakkambalam, a corporate social responsibility (CSR) initiative of the Kitex Group, in collaboration with the Chavara Cultural Centre and Parvanendu School of Thiruvathira. Held on 1 May 2017, the event featured 6,582 participants (aged 10–75), including women and girls from Kerala, 20 other Indian states, and one Russian national. Participants, trained by renowned Thiruvathirakali instructors, performed a synchronized 16-minute dance in traditional kasavu mundu and neriyathu attire provided by the Kitex Group. Guinness World Records adjudicator Rishi Nath officially certified the achievement.

=== Previous records ===
- 2015: A record was set on 2 February 2015 in Irinjalakuda, Thrissur, with 5,211 women led by Jitha Binoy under the banner Thanima.
- 2012: The Mumbai Pooram Foundation organized a performance in Dombivli, Maharashtra, on 9 November 2012, involving 2,639 women from diverse linguistic and religious backgrounds, including Keralites, Maharashtrians, Gujaratis, Bengalis, Tamils, Telugus, and Kannadigas.
- 2013: A Kochi-based event on 14 December 2013 saw over 3,000 participants attempting to break the existing record ahead of Thiruvathirai festivities (18 December 2013).
