= Ivor Madom =

Temple in Kerala, India

Ivor Madom Parthasarathy Temple is a popular temple situated in Pampady village near Thiruvilwamala in Thrissur district, on the southern bank of Bharathappuzha, the second longest river of Kerala. The main deity of this temple is Lord Krishna as Parthasarathy (The charioteer of Arjuna, the third among the five Pandavas), and there are sub-shrines for Ganapathi, Ayyappan, Shiva and Snake deities. The riverside near this temple is famous for performing rituals for dead ancestors. There is also a crematorium, jointly owned by Ivor Madom trust and Thiruvilwamala Grama Panchayat, near this temple.

== History ==
The legends says that this (Ivor Madom) is the place where Pandavas, after Kurukshetra War, got relief from their mental agony by doing prayers and Bali Tarpanas for their Gurujis and cousins who were killed by them in the war. Bharathapuzha is believed to have cleansed them of all their sins and restored their mental strength. 'Ivor' literally means 'five people' in Malayalam, and thus the temple came to be known as Ivor Madom after the five Pandavas. Even now, hundreds of people come to Ivor Madom Sree Krishna temple and do the last rites and Bali Tarpanam to those departed souls dear to them.

== Temple dress code ==
Men: Traditional Mundu is allowed. (Lungi, Shirt and Banian not allowed inside sanctum sanctorum)

Women: Saree, Set Mundu, Salwar Kameez, Skirts and Blouse are allowed.

== Other features ==
The main deity is Lord Krishna, in Parthasarathy form facing east. His idol is 4 ft tall. Mahaganapathy, Ayyappan, Nagas, Shiva, etc. are the sub-deities. Palpayasam is the main nivedyam.
