= Kuthampally dhoties and set mundu =

Dhoties and set mundus manufactured in Kuthampally, India

Kuthampally dhoties and set mundu are dhoties and set mundus (also known as mundum neriyathum) manufactured by the weavers in the Kuthampally region in Kerala, India. This clothing product has been registered under Sub-section (1) of Section 13 of the Geographical Indications of Goods (Registration and Protection) Act, 1999 with effect from 13 November 2015. The registration was recorded as per an application made by Kuthampully Handlom Cluster Charitable Society Consortium.

The goods coming under the Geographical indication are double dhoti (or, double mundu or double veshti or Kuthampully dhoti), set mundu (or, mundum neriyathum) and neriyathu (or, kavani).

Kuthampally is a village in the Thiruvilwamala Gramapanchayath of Thalapilly Taluk of Thrissur District in Kerala. Historically, Kuthampally was the original centre for the weaving of these clothing products. Kuthampally became the center of this tradition after weavers from Karnataka were brought in the eighteenth century by then rulers of Cochin Kingdom and settled in Kuthampally to weave clothing materials exclusively for the members of the royal family.

== See also ==
- Kuthampully Saree
