= Kunukku =

Traditional Christian earring in Kerala

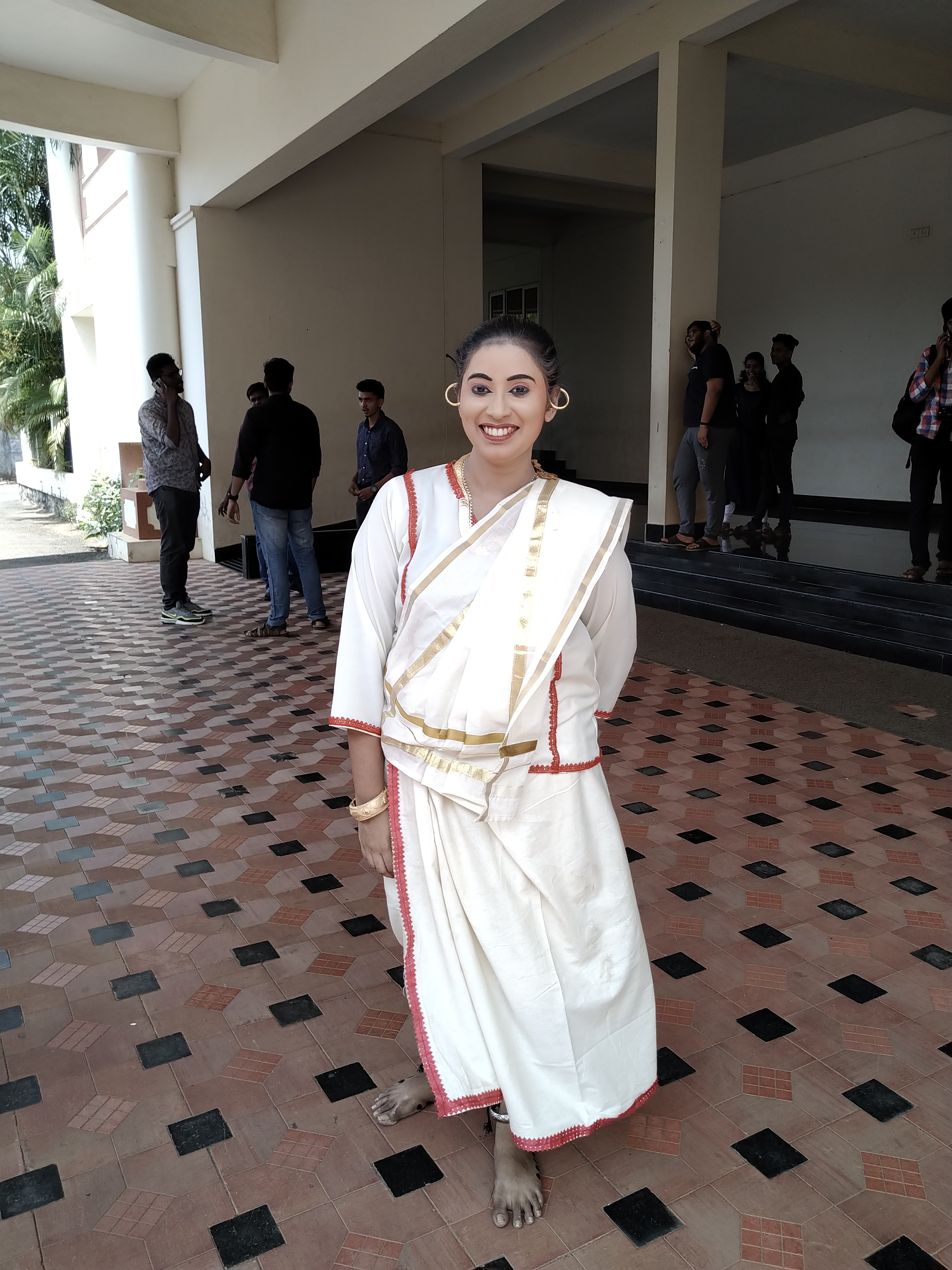
A Margamkali performer wearing gold kunukku earrings.

Kunukku (Malayalam: കുണുക്ക്), also known as Mekkamothiram (Malayalam: മേക്കാമോതിരം), is a traditional form of gold earring traditionally worn by Saint Thomas Christian women in Kerala, India.

== Description ==
The kunukku is a heavy, gilded, circular gold earring worn on the upper earlobes by Syrian Christian (Nasrani) women. It consists of a circular, thin chain with a small ball hanging from it. It is in the shape of an upside-down water droplet with a ball hanging at the end of it.

== History ==
It has been stated that the practice of wearing kunukku earrings originated in ancient Biblical times. Genesis 35:4 suggests that ancient Israelite or Hebrew women wore circular earrings resembling kunukku, often designed in the shape of the sun or the moon. According to the Jerome Biblical Commentary, it was believed that they represented different deities or gods and were worn either for decorative purposes or as symbols of reverence for the Sun and Moon gods worshipped in ancient Egypt and Arabia. A similar custom appears to have been inherited by the Saint Thomas Christians along with other traditions and cultural elements of Hebraic origin. Comparable ornaments, resembling the mekkamothiram, were also reportedly worn by Cochin Jewish women, much like the jewellery traditionally worn by Syrian Christian women.

During the 1950s, the kunukku was worn with the chattayum mundum by Syrian Christian women as it was deemed fashionable. However, during the 1970s, the wearing of kunukku earrings declined. Only a few senior Syrian Christian women continue to wear the earrings.

== In art ==
The kunukku or mekkamothiram earrings are a part of the Christian jewellery worn by Margamkali performers.

== In popular culture ==
In Arundhati Roy's 1997 Booker Prize winning novel, The God of Small Things, the kunukku earrings were mentioned as worn by Kochu Maria, who couldn't stop wearing them even though she had to sew her right lobe because those caused a split as those earrings symbolised that she was a Syrian Christian.

== See also ==
- Saint Thomas Christians
- Margamkali
- Chattayum mundum
- Minnu
