= Ringtest =

A ringtest for quality management is part of an external quality assurance programme for a measuring method. Ringtest is also called proficiency test or interlaboratory test. Usually a reference institute sends identical samples which have to be analyzed for special parameters to different laboratories. The industrial, medical or research laboratory gets a limited time with a deadline to send in the analysis results. The statistical evaluation and interpretation of the laboratories’ results is a great help for all participating labs as it opens the possibility to assess the quality of their analysis compared to other laboratories. Participation in ringtests is obligatory for accredited laboratories (e.g. according to ISO 17025, etc.). Nevertheless, non-accredited laboratories can also take part in ringtests.

== Fields of application ==
- tests of medical parameters (blood, urine, tissue etc.)
- food analysis
- environmental analysis (soil, plants, freshwater sediment, marine sediment, seawater, biota, shellfish toxins, manure & compost, biomass)
- material analysis
- paternity testing (autosomal DNA markers, Y and X chromosomal markers, mtDNA sequencing)
