= Mundum neriyatum =

Traditional clothing of women in Kerala

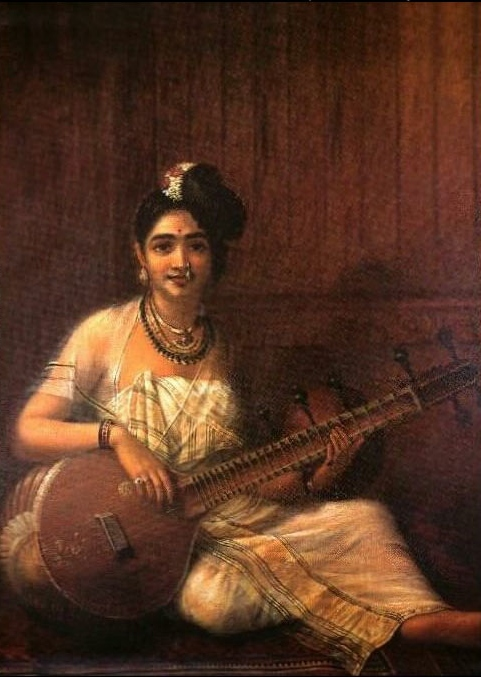
Malabar lady with the Veena, by Raja Ravi Verma depicts a woman wearing the mundu

Mundum neriyatum (Malayalam: മുണ്ട് നേരിയത്; settu-mundu or mundu-set) is the traditional clothing of women in Kerala, a state in southwestern India. It is the oldest remnant of the ancient form of the sari which covered only the lower part of the body. In the mundum neriyatum, the most basic traditional piece is the mundu or the lower garment which is the ancient form of the sari denoted in Malayalam as tuṇi (meaning cloth), while the nēriyatu forms the upper garment the mundu. The mundum neriyatum consists of two pieces of cloth, and could be worn in either the traditional style with the nēriyatu tucked inside the blouse, or in the modern style with the nēriyatu worn over the left shoulder.

== Origins ==
The mundum neriyatum is the extant form of the ancient sari referred to as sattika in Hindu, Buddhist and Jain literature. The mundu is the surviving form of lower garment of the ancient clothing referred to as antariya worn in a special way (lower garment). The neriyatu is the modern adaptation of a thin scarf worn from the right shoulder to the left shoulder referred to in ancient Buddhist-Jain texts as the uttariya. These two-set garments eventually evolved into what is now known as Kerala sari. Mundum neriyatum is the traditional clothing of Nayar women, later adopted by modern Kerala as the Kerala saree. Travancore Nayars, mundum neriyatum is the mantra koti (divine clothing) gifted by the groom to the bride at the moment of wedding. Now in modern Kerala it's the most celebrated Kerala sari.

Surviving medieval Kerala mural paintings depict the existence of three-styles of clothing worn by women, these include one-piece mundu, single-piece sari with over-lapping pleats resembling nivi-drape worn today by Mohiniyattam dancers and two-piece mundum neriyatum attire which evolved into Kerala sari.

== Basic drape ==
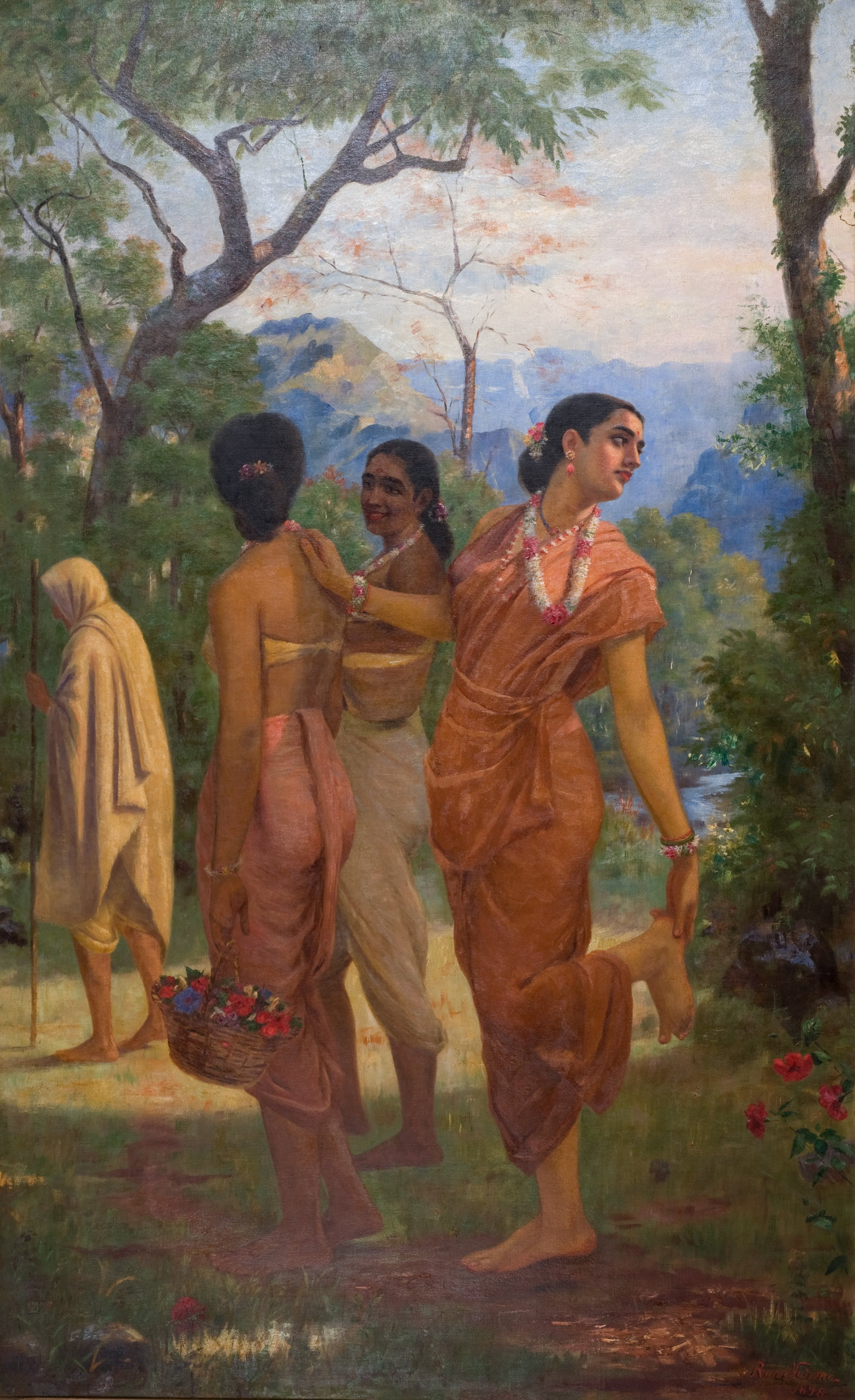
Shakuntala, by Raja Ravivarma is shown draped in a variation of kaccha mundum neriyatum (back tuck) with shoulder veil.

The mundum neriyatum is traditionally white or cream in colour and consists of two pieces of cloth, which have a coloured strip at the border known as kara. The piece of cloth that drapes the lower garment is called the mundu. It is worn below the navel and around the hips, similar to the mundu worn by men in Kerala. The piece of cloth that is worn as the upper garment is called the neriyatu. One end of the neriyatu is tucked inside the pavada or petticoat and the remaining long end is worn across the front torso. The neriyatu is worn over a blouse that reaches quite above the breast bone. It is worn diagonally from the right hip to the left shoulder and across the midriff, partly baring it. The remaining loose end of the neriyatu is left hanging from the left shoulder, resembling the nivi sari. Today the nivi drape, is the most common form of the sari. A mundum neriyatum is starched before being draped and is worn over a blouse that matches the colour of the border or kara.

== Ornamental and festive use ==
The mundum neriyatum is worn as everyday costume and also as distinct costume on festive occasions, in which case the Kara is ornamental in couture. During the Keralite festival of Onam, women of all ages wear the mundum neriyatum and take part in folk dance performed by women called kaikottikalli. The mundum neriyatum for festive occasion has golden coloured borders or a broad zari border known as kasavu, lending the costume another name of Kasavu Sari. The colour for the blouse of the mundum neriyatum for this occasion is determined by the age and marital status of the woman. Young unmarried girls wear green coloured blouse, while married middle aged mothers wear red blouses.

The kasavu or the golden border is either a pure golden layer, copper coated or artificial. The fabric of mundu-sari is cotton and is always woven by hand. Kara or simple line designs adorn the bottom of these saris, while at times small peacock or temple designs embellish the pallu. The mundum neriyatum is also known as set mundu, kasavu mundu, mundu-sari, set-sari, or set veshti. The veshti is another version of the sari which consists of small upper clothing resembling a blouse-like garment worn without the pallu along with a mundu as lower garment.

== Kerala sari ==
The Kerala sari is worn as a garment that consists of a single piece of cloth. Otherwise, the Kerala sari closely resembles the mundum neriyatum and is often worn by Malayali women as a quasi mundum neriyatum.

== Cultural symbolism ==
The mundum neriyatum is the cultural costume of women of the Malayali community. The grace and appeal of the golden borders contrasting with the otherwise plain white mundum neriyatum of Keralite women has come to symbolize Malayali women. Both the traditional and modern styles of the mundum neriyatum are depicted in the paintings of the Indian painter Raja Ravi Varma. The mundum neriyatum was modified in several paintings depicting Shakuntala from the Mahabharata to a style of draping now popularly known as the 'nivi sari' or 'national drape'. In one of his paintings the Indian subcontinent was shown as a mother wearing a flowing nivi sari.

== See also ==
- Dhoti
- Mundu
- Sarong
- Kuthampally dhoties and set mundu

== References and bibliography ==
- Boulanger, C (1997) Saris: An Illustrated Guide to the Indian Art of Draping, Shakti Press International, New York. ISBN 0-9661496-1-0
- Mohapatra, R. P. (1992) "Fashion styles of ancient India", B. R. Publishing corporation, ISBN 81-7018-723-0
- Ghurye (1951) "Indian costume", Popular book depot (Bombay); (Includes rare photographs of 19th century Namboothiri and nair women in ancient sari with bare upper torso).
- Alkazi, Roshan (1983) "Ancient Indian costume", Art Heritage
- Mahaparinibbanasutta (ancient Buddhist text)
- Miller, Daniel & Banerjee, Mukulika; (2004) "The Sari", Lustre press / Roli books
- Bjorn Landstrom (1964) "The Quest for India", Doubleday (publisher) English Edition, Stockholm.
- T.K Velu Pillai, (1940) "The Travancore State Manual"; 4 volumes; Trivandrum
- Miller, J. Innes. (1969). The Spice Trade of The Roman Empire: 29 B.C. to A.D. 641. Oxford University Press. Special edition for Sandpiper Books. 1998. ISBN 0-19-814264-1.
- K.V. Krishna Iyer (1971) Kerala's Relations with the Outside World, pp. 70, 71 in "The Cochin Synagogue Quatercentenary Celebrations Commemoration Volume", Kerala History Association, Cochin.
- Periplus Maris Erythraei "The Periplus of the Erythraean Sea", (trans). Wilfred Schoff (1912), reprinted South Asia Books 1995 ISBN 81-215-0699-9
