= Kasavu =

Technique used in handlooms of Kerala

Kasavu (Malayalam: [kɐsɐʋɨ̆]) is a technique used in handlooms of Kerala, with very fine threads of gold or silver used in weave to make border lines and designs on silk and cotton fabrics. This technique later spread to most of India and the Kasav technique was developed for many other fabrics across India. White or off-white cotton cloth with Kasav borders that originated in the South Indian state of Kerala is now famous as Kerala saree is believed to be the first form of use of the Kasav technique.

== Origins ==
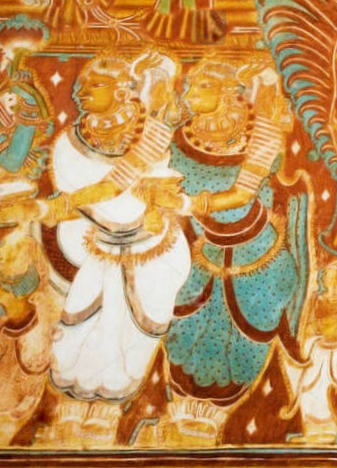
Celestial maidens wearing two piece lower and upper garments (Mundum Neriyathum drape), detail from the Gajendra Moksha mural at Krishnapuram Palace, c. 1730 CE.

The original kasavu was made by hand using fine golden or silver threads to make border lines or designs on cotton or silk fabrics.

The two-piece draped attire (Mundum Neriyathum) traces back to ancient Indian garments (Antariya and Uttariya mentioned in early Buddhist, Jain, and Hindu literature), while the fine zari-weaving technique (Kasavu) was commercialized in Kerala through royal patronage of weaving communities between the 16th and 19th centuries and continues to be worn by Malayalis, the residents of Kerala. It is worn by both women and men, especially during festivals, dances, and special occasions such as weddings and piranna naal (birthdays according to the local calendar.) During the Vishu festival, it is customary to place a brand new kasavu cloth near the traditional Vishukkani (lamp) as a symbol of wealth and prosperity. During dance performances such as the Mohiniyattam (dance of Vishnu in female form), only kasavu garments are worn by participants. Dances such as Kaikottikali or Thiruvathirakkali (dance of clapping) also have women performers wearing kasavu sarees and traditional red blouses.

It is believed to have been brought to Kerala in the early 19th century by Maharaja Avattam Thirunal Balaramavarma and his concubine Ummini Thambi. According to the 'Study and Documenting of Balaramapuram Sarees and Fine Cotton Fabrics', the leaders revolutionized the handloom industry by inviting the saliya/Chaliyan community from Nagercoil in Tamil Nadu and giving them respect and pride within the state. In return, weavers made hand-woven cotton garments for the Travancore royal family using market-sourced cotton. Catching the attention of Dutch and Portuguese exporters, handwoven sarees quickly became more popular

== Styles ==
Traditionally Kasav was gold or silver threads but the cost of gold and silver has reduced its use. A typical white or off-white garment with a gold or silver coloured border is considered traditional and is called Kerala saree or Kerala Mundu. Garments made with kasavu are long, rectangular pieces of cloth called the mundu, wrapped around the lower body, and the veshti, wrapped around the upper body. Women typically wear a red, green or gold traditional blouse under the veshti while men sometimes wear a formal shirt.

The cost of a "kasavu set" or "kasavu settu" comprising the mundu and veshti varies according to the width of the gold borders. Borders can range from 3/4" or less, to 6" or more in width.

== Location ==
Though originally from Kerala, over time kasavu has spread across India, especially to the adjoining south Indian states of Tamil Nadu, Karnataka, Andhra Pradesh, and Telangana. In Kerala, there are villages devoted entirely to the manufacture of kasavu cloth. Notable among them is the village of Kuthampully near Ottapalam, which lies between Thrissur and Palakkad. The Devanga chettiar community of weavers in Kuthampully were brought from Karnataka by the Maharaja of Kochin 500 years back. The entire village population create kasavu cloth, pool their produce together, and sell it through a centralized, collective market.

== Modern kasavu ==
The traditional mundu-veshti has evolved over time and women prefer to wear a single-piece saree rather than the original two-piece garment. Also, the original garments had pure gold borders, whereas the newer versions have red, green, orange etc. colours along with gold, to make them look more attractive. Powerlooms are also replacing handlooms but the machine-made fabric differs in texture from the original, though they are cheaper to produce on a mass scale.
