= Kerala sari =

Sari type originating from Kerala, India

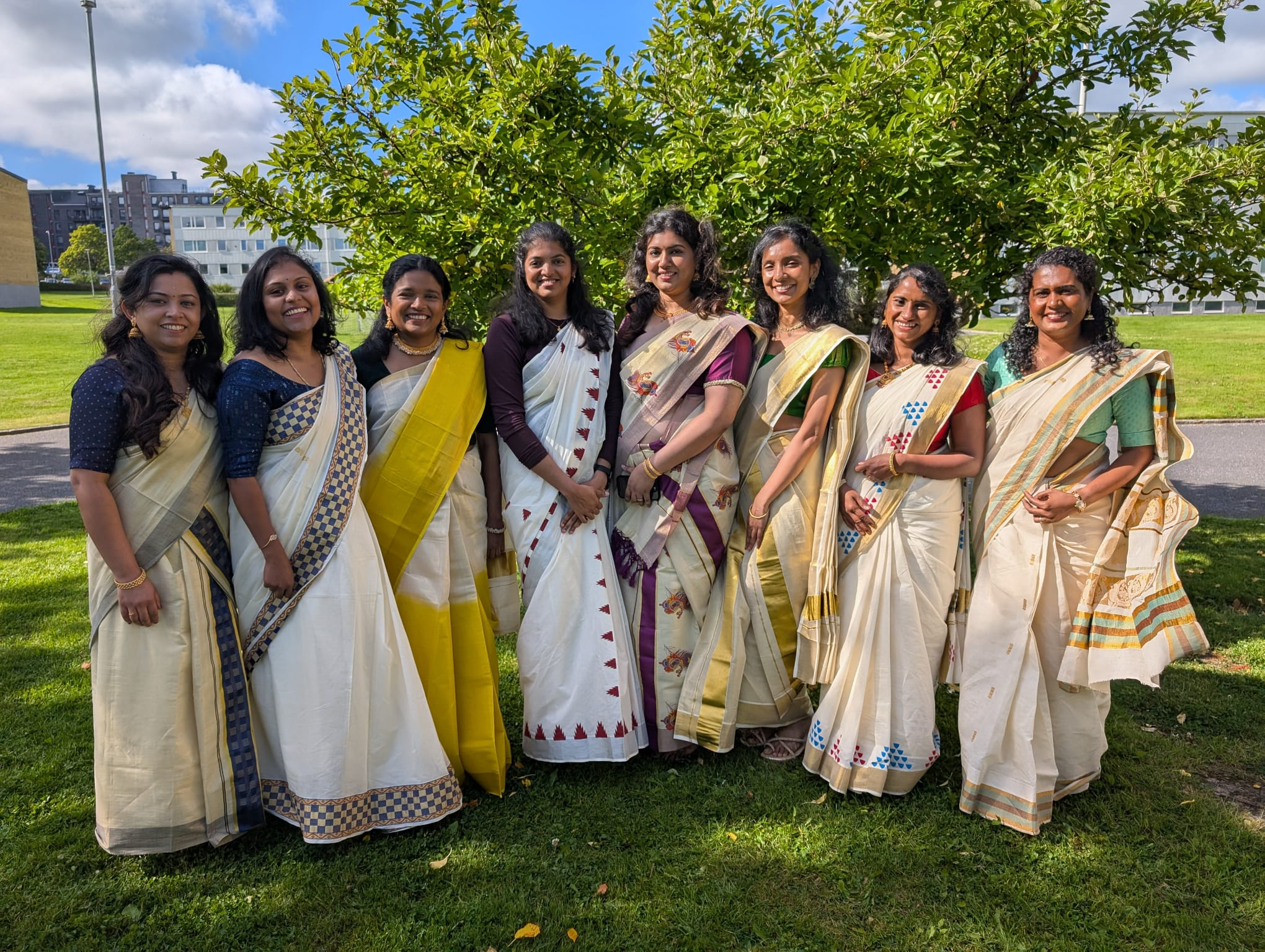
Women dressed in Kerala sari. Three of these women are wearing Mundum Neriyathum.

Kerala sari (Set-sari) (Malayalam: കേരള സാരി) is a clothing of women in the Indian state of Kerala.

== Mundum Neriyathum ==
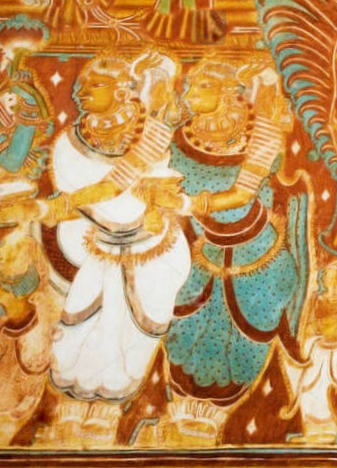
Women dressed in two-piece sari, scene from Kerala Mural, 1730 CE.

It is worn as a garment that closely resembles the mundum neriyathum though it is not considered a true mundum neriyathum by classic definition. Traditional mundum neriyathum consists of a two-piece cloth, while Kerala sari is worn in a way to resemble navi drape using two-piece mundum neiyathum. Otherwise, the Kerala sari closely resembles the mundum neriyathum and is often worn by Malayali women as a quasi mundum neriyathum.

Surviving medieval Kerala mural paintings depict existence of three-styles of clothing worn by women, these include one-piece mundum, single-piece sari with over-lapping pleats resembling nivi-drape worn today by Mohiniyattam dancers and two-piece mundam-neryathum attire which evolved into Kerala sari.

== Weaving centers ==
Balaramapuram, Chendamangalam and Kuthampully are the three major sari weaving centres in Kerala, these clusters have been given a Geographical Indication Tag by the Indian Government and all three are famous for the weaving of Kasavu saris notable for its white cotton or silk textile with golden borders.

The Balaramapuram cluster weavers traditionally weave Kasavu saris and mundu. The Balaramapuram cluster is known for having a simple gold border and it is woven out of cotton and silk yarn. Chendamangalam, the second cluster, is known for weaving saris with cotton and silk and striped golden borders. They are similar to Balaramapuram but with lesser emphasis on the golden border. Weaving in Chedamangalam was introduced by the Paliam royal family. Paliath Achans, who were the Rajas of Chendamangalam and the hereditary prime ministers to the Maharaja of Kochi have been associated with Chendamangalam from the 16th century onwards. The Devanga Chettiars settled in this region at their behest to serve the family's sartorial needs. The Kuthampully cluster is based in Thrissur District, their history dates back 500 years when their forefathers came to Kerala from Mysore. The weavers of Kuthampully came under the patronage of the Kochi royal family, and had woven fabrics for the royal family. The saris by Kuthampully weavers are quite different from the other two clusters as they include more patterns, borders and motifs.

== Cultural costume ==
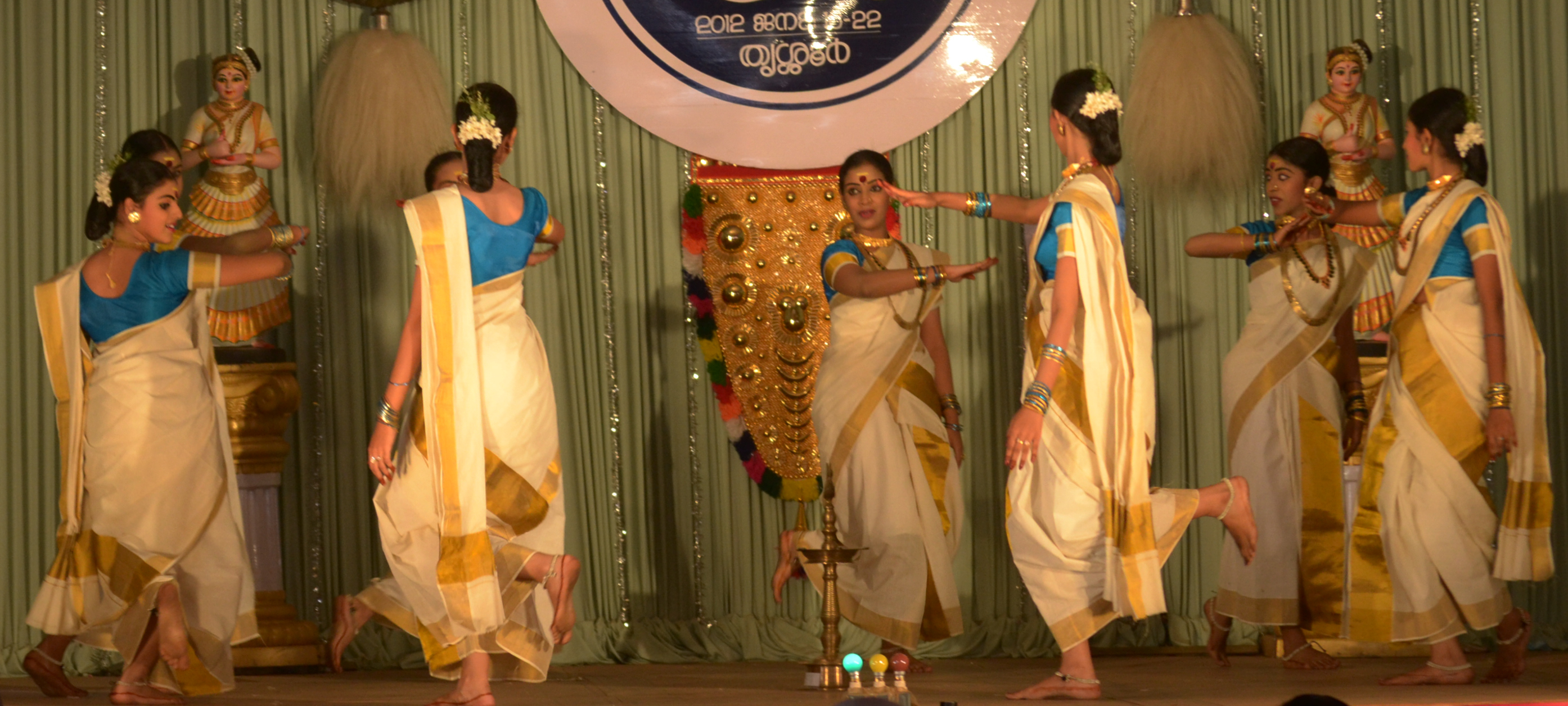
Thiruvathirakali dancers dressed in Kerala sari.

Kerala sari is regarded as the cultural costume of women of the Malayali community. The grace and appeal of the golden borders contrasting with the otherwise plain white mundum neryathum of Keralite women has come to symbolize Malayali women. The sari is a hot favorite during the time of Onam, not just in Kerala but in other parts of India as well.

== In popular culture ==
Both the traditional and modern styles of the mundum neryathum are depicted in the paintings of the Indian painter Raja Ravi Varma. The mundum neriyathum was modified in several paintings depicting shakuntala from the mahabharatha to a style of draping now popularly known as the 'nivi saree' or 'national drape'. In one of his paintings, the Indian subcontinent was shown as a mother wearing a flowing nivi saree.

== See also ==
- Sari
- Mundum Neriyathum
- Mundu

== References and bibliography ==
- Boulanger, C (1997) Saris: An Illustrated Guide to the Indian Art of Draping, Shakti Press International, New York. ISBN 0-9661496-1-0
- Mohapatra, R. P. (1992) Fashion styles of ancient India, B. R. Publishing corporation, ISBN 81-7018-723-0
- Alkazi, Roshan (1983) "Ancient Indian costume", Art Heritage
- Mahaparinibbanasutta (ancient Buddhist text)
- Miller, Daniel & Banerjee, Mukulika; (2004) The Sari, Lustre press / Roli books
- Bjorn Landstrom (1964) The Quest for India, Doubleday English edition, Stockholm.
- T.K Velu Pillai, (1940) "The Travancore State Manual"; 4 volumes; Trivandrum
- Miller, J. Innes. (1969). The Spice Trade of The Roman Empire: 29 B.C. to A.D. 641. Oxford University Press. Special edition for Sandpiper Books. 1998. ISBN 0-19-814264-1.
- K.V. Krishna Iyer (1971) "Kerala’s Relations with the Outside World," pp. 70, 71 in The Cochin Synagogue Quatercentenary Celebrations Commemoration Volume, Kerala History Association, Cochin.
- Periplus Maris Erythraei, The Periplus of the Erythraean Sea, (trans). Wilfred Schoff (1912), reprinted South Asia Books 1995 ISBN 81-215-0699-9
