= Thiruvathirakkali =

Group dance of women in Kerala

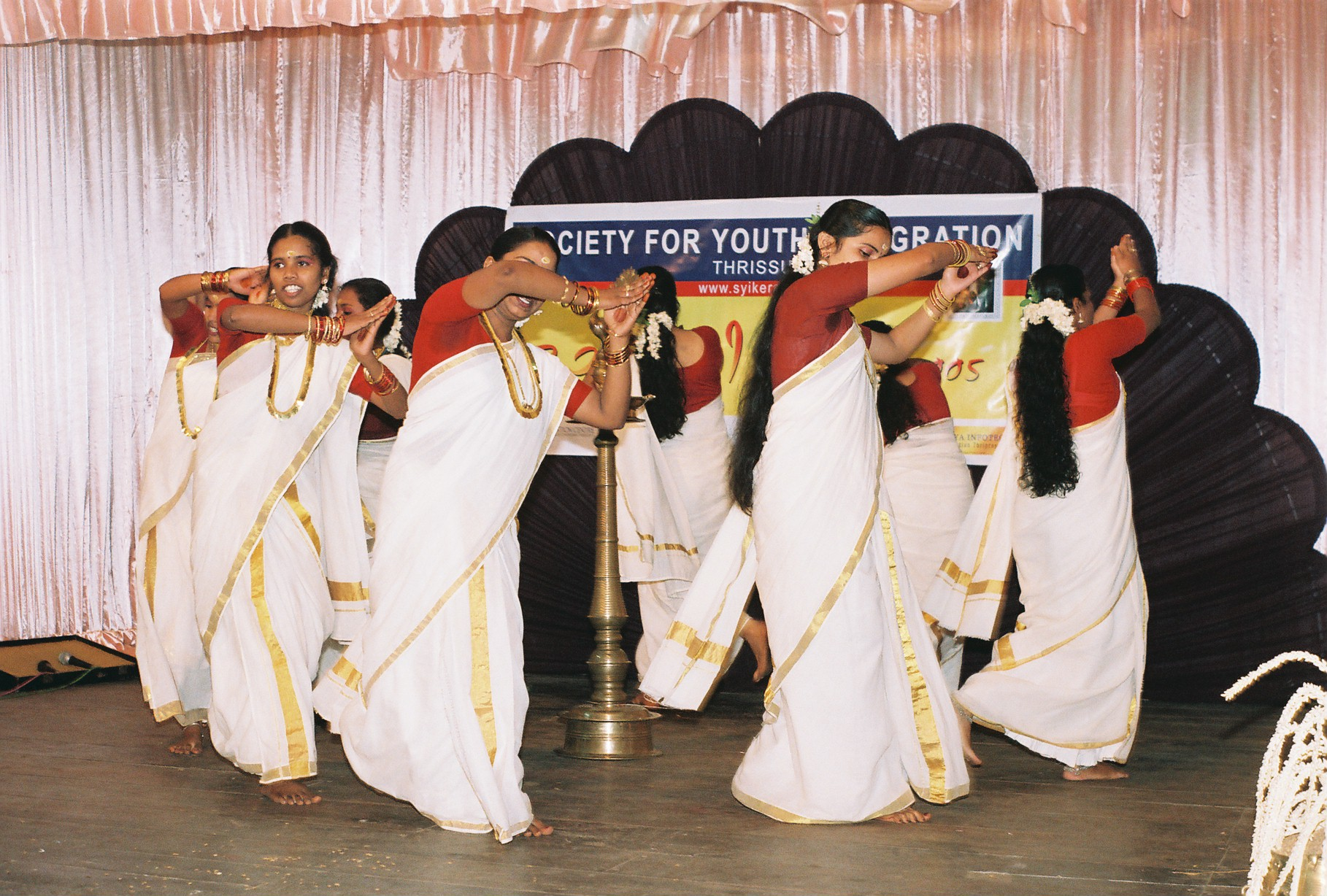
Thiruvathirakali

Thiruvathirakali at Sri Kurumbakkavu, Poikkattussery

Thiruvathirakali is a group dance of women in Kerala. The dance is performed by women in small groups, both as part of and apart from religious rituals. Generally on Onam and Thiruvathira day in the month of Dhanumas, women perform this art form by singing praises of Shiva and Parvati in Shiva temples, etc. Thiruvathirakali is especially for women who observe Thiruvathira Vradam. This art form is also known as Kaikottikali and Kummikali with slight variations.

The dance is believed to bring a long and auspicious married life and marriage of choice. This play is performed at night on Thiruvathira day. The first Thiruvathira after the marriage of girls is called Poothiruvathira.

== Ceremonies and Rituals ==
In ancient times, this dance was performed for 28 days starting from Thiruvathira day till Thiruvathira in the next month. In some places, an 11-day program is performed during the month of Dhanum.

Ceremonies begin with the eating of a special meal called Ettangadi on Makairyam day, the day before Thiruvathira day. The ingredients of Ettangadi are sorghum, yam, kachil, berry, yam, lentil, sugar, and honey. It is eaten the night before. But this ceremony is not observed today.

Dasapushkas are collected in front of the house during the day. Thiruvathirakali starts after sunset. After Thiruvathira nakshatramudhi at midnight, the dancers sing devotional songs and bring dasa flowers along with Ashtamangalyam holding the lamp to the house. Later they wear these flowers in their hair. This is called half-breeding. The flowers are lit by singing songs praising the deities of each flower. Crows are also seen.

The girls dance in a circle around a lit candle to the beat of the song, clapping each other's hands. Sarees and blouses are the attire used for Thiruvathirakali. A group of girls playing Thiruvathira will see a heroine. The heroine sings the first line and the ensemble responds to the same line. The group members step and clap their hands to the rhythm of the song. Lasyabhava is a shadow throughout the game. The steps in the game performed during the pooja are very simple. This makes it easy for even the uninitiated to participate in the game.
