= Balaramapuram =

Suburb in Kerala, India

- Suburb
- Location in Kerala, India Balaramapuram (India)
- Coordinates: 8°23′N 77°5′E
- Country: India
- State: Kerala
- District: Thiruvananthapuram
- Named for: King Balaramavarama

Government
  - Body: Special Grade Grama Panchayat

Area
  - Total: 10.53 km^{2} (4.07 sq mi)

Population (2011)
  - Total: 36,134
  - Density: 3,432/km^{2} (8,888/sq mi)

Languages
  - Official: Malayalam, English
- Time zone: UTC+5:30 (IST)
- Vehicle registration: KL-20
- Website: Balaramapuram

Balaramapuram is one of the panchayats that form the city of Thiruvananthapuram, the capital of Kerala, India. It is the most urbanized panchayat in Thiruvananthapuram.

Balaramapuram is the centre for production for traditional varieties of Balaramapuram Handlooms worn in contemporary styles throughout Kerala. Balaramapuram is a major trade centre for clothing, groceries, furniture, electronics, metals etc. Balaramapuram is also known for mutton, chicken, oyster and fish dishes. There are multiple religious groups in Balaramapuram, including a Christian church, St. Sebastian's Church.

== Location ==
Balaramapuram is located on National Highway 66 15 km south of Thiruvananthapuram , the capital city of Kerala, India and 17 km north of Parassala and the southern boundary of the state. Balaramapuram is located at 8°23′N 77°5′E.

== History ==
During the reign of Maharaja Balarama Varma (r. 1798-1810) handloom weaving was first introduced at Balaramapuram, and the panchayat is named in his honour. The maharaja and his delava (chief minister), Ummini Thampi jointly decided to convert Balaramapuram and the surrounding area's industry into an agro-based industrial belt by developing various traditional industries such as paddy and coconut cultivation, fishing, weaving, and oil extraction.

The delava of the maharaja brought seven weaver families (shaliars) from Tamil Nadu to weave fabrics for the members of the royal family. The shaliars were settled in an area that is now known as Shaliar Street, and many of the current residents are descendants of the original seven families. Marketplaces were opened at location conveniently accessible to the weavers to facilitate the sale of their goods.

== Shaliar community structure ==
The people of the shaliar community in Balaramapuram speak Tamil and marry within their own community. The shaliar settlement has four main streets, on which the weavers are settled in row houses. The four streets are Single Street, Double Street, Vinayagar Street, and New Street.

The temple of Agastya is placed axially along the main streets. The main deities of the temple are: Shiva, Agastya, and Lopamudra. Vinayaka, Muruga, Navagrahas, Naga, and Krishna are also worshipped at the temple. The current President of Agasthiar Swamy Devasthanam is Sri Venkitachalam, and the secretary is Sri Laxmanan.

Double Street has two temples – The Muttaramman Temple and the Vinayagar Temple. There is a Ganapathi temple on Vinayagar Street. For males above the age of 18, membership in the temple committee is compulsory. The temple, and its related functions, form the social hub of much of the shaliar community.

=== Muslim weaving community and Anchuvannam in Balaramapuram ===
Balaramapuram (also spelt Balarampuram) is a town near Thiruvananthapuram in Kerala, India, noted for a centuries-old handloom weaving tradition that produces the famous kasavu mundu and sarees. The weaving cluster grew under royal patronage during the Travancore period and continues to be an important living craft — practised by multiple social and religious communities in the area, including significant participation by Muslim weaving households. The term Anchuvannam (often encountered in historical literature as Anjuvannam or Anjuvannam/Anjuman-derived forms) historically refers to a medieval merchant guild of West Asian traders; its direct link to local textile production in places such as Balaramapuram is indirect but regionally relevant because of long-standing coastal trade networks that shaped Kerala’s craft and mercantile history.

=== Anchuvannam (Anjuvannam): merchant guild and wider historical context ===
Anchuvannam (historically Anjuvannam in medieval inscriptions and scholarship) denotes a coastal merchant guild — originally a body of West Asian (Persian, Arab, Jewish, Syriac, and Parsi) traders — that operated across South India’s trading ports from at least the 9th century CE. The guild’s activities in ports along the Malabar and Coromandel coasts helped integrate Kerala into long-distance Indian Ocean trade networks for textiles, spices and other goods. While Anjuvannam itself was a mercantile organisation rather than a weaving guild, its role in maritime commerce shaped demand, exchange networks, and the flows of raw materials (including fine cottons and metal threads/zari) that fed local textile production in coastal centres such as those that later became important weaving hubs. Thus, Anchuvannam’s historical presence helps explain the cosmopolitan commercial ecology in which Kerala’s handloom crafts — including those of Balaramapuram — evolved.

== Urban environment ==
The shaliar community settlement covers an area of approximately 13 acres (5.3 ha) south of NH-47. Main entrance is from NH-47 to the 9 m wide Single Street. The entry is not well defined. The Single Street with two-story buildings on either side act as an axis with the Agastya temple being the focal point. Single street, Double street, and the New street are the main streets The Agastya temple is placed at the point of intersection of these streets. The streets are used by the areas residents as a space for outdoor social gatherings, as the homes along them lack yard space.

The houses of the shaliar weavers reflect their culture, occupation, and religious beliefs. They have a rectangular layout with houses sharing common walls. All the houses have production units attached to them, used for the traditional weaving. The houses of the wealthier families have showrooms to display their goods. The unique details of the facades, the internal courtyards, and the arrangement of rooms to suit the occupation of weaving, make the houses unique in nature.

There are very few open spaces or car parking facilities within the settlement. The streets are dotted with community wells. Lack of infrastructure like levelled roads, public water supply, street drains, and sewerage are some problems faced by the community. In most places the streets are not levelled and are not accessible to vehicles.

== Weaving ==
Balaramapuram Handlooms weavers use a traditional type of throw-shuttle pit looms for the production of exclusively cotton fabrics with pure zeri. They do not use any type of improved appliances such as Dobby, Jacquard, Jala, etc. for the production of designs for cloth with extra warp and extra weft. Identical appearance of designs, including warp and weft stripes on the face, and backside, of the fabric is obtained by this technique of weaving.

No changes have taken place in the methods and looms used for the production of the region's textiles. The variety known as "Pudava and Kavani" (veshti and upper cloth with pure zeri) still remains as a prestigious bridal gift in marriages. The designs with zeri or coloured yarn, using the age-old technique still has unparallel appeal which can attract even the most sophisticated customers.

Five percent of the houses run agencies for hand loom items. These houses act as collecting points of hand loom clothes produced in the area. Nine percent of houses do not have any home based activity. Twenty-seven percent of houses use traditional means of production, whereas 59% are based on new methods.

== Present conditions ==
Presently, a major portion of Balaramapuram Handlooms clothes produced in this area is sold to the Handloom Development Corporation and Hantex. Due to the emergence of power looms in the weaving industry, and a drop in the prices of the textile products, the inhabitants of the area have found it difficult to persevere in the same industry. This lack of economic opportunity in the traditional weaving sector has led many members of the younger generations to break with tradition and seek higher education and employment in other sectors.

Another cause of theses changes is the low price per unit of the textile goods. Hand–loom weavers overheads are much higher than mass-producing textile factories, and it is hard for their businesses to stay afloat in the modern economy. Varieties of woven clothes previously reserved for hand–loom weavers are now open for production on power looms, making competition next to impossible.

Nowadays, a new concept in handloom industry introduced in this area is Ayurvastra, a branch of Ayurveda, the ancient 5,000-year-old Indian system of Vedic healthcare. Loosely translated, "Ayur" is Sanskrit for health, and "Vastra" is clothing, Ayurvastra means Healthy Fabrics, the Ayurvastra project was initiated and launched by the Directorate of Handloom, Department of Industries and Commerce and the Department of Government Ayurveda College, aimed at creating a niche for the wellness textiles. Ayurvastra textiles are processed using herbs and plants instead of synthetic dyes.

Until 1990, the varieties of textiles produced in Balaramapuram had excellent market potential. The area's weavers were earning a reasonable income, and could maintain a better standard of living. Nearly 5100 looms were engaged in the production of such fabrics. No attempt was made to exploit the skill of such weavers, who are masters in their trade, to produce any other variety for expanding market demand. However, recently this seems to be changing and the demand for hand loomed products is high.

== Transport ==
Balaramapuram railway station is situated 1 km from NH47 at Balaramapuram. The station's code name is ‘BRAM’. The station is amongst the top hundred stations in the Indian Railways system by volume of ticket booking and train traffic. The total number of trains that pass through the Balaramapuram (BRAM) junction is 50.

== See also ==
- Neyyattinkara
- Neyyattinkara Railway Station
- Amaravila
- Kanjiramkulam
- Thiruvananthapuram
- Municipalities of Kerala
- Upper cloth revolt
- Neyyattinkara Sree Krishna Swami Temple
