= Kuthampully saree =

Kuthampully saree is a type of sari traditionally made by weavers from Kuthampully village in Thiruvilwamala Grama Panchayat of Thrissur district of Kerala state in India. The Kuthampully Saree is distinguished by its Saree borders.

== History ==
In 1972, Kuthampully Handloom Industrial Cooperative Society was registered with 102 members. Kannada people is almost living in kuthampully . Their caste were Devanga origin at Bangalore and Mysore. Now it has 814 members with own building in Kuthampully. In September 2011, the Kuthampully saree got exclusive intellectual property rights through Geographical indication Act (GI).
