= Mundu =

Traditional draped garment for the lower body, worn in South Asia and the Maldives

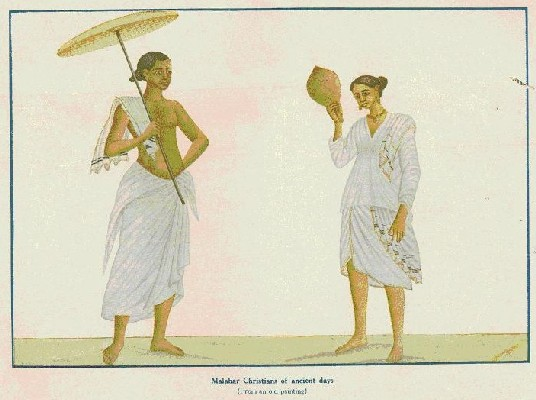
Nasranis or Syrian Christians of Kerala wearing mundu (from an old painting). Photo published in the Cochin Government Royal War Efforts Souvenir in 1938.

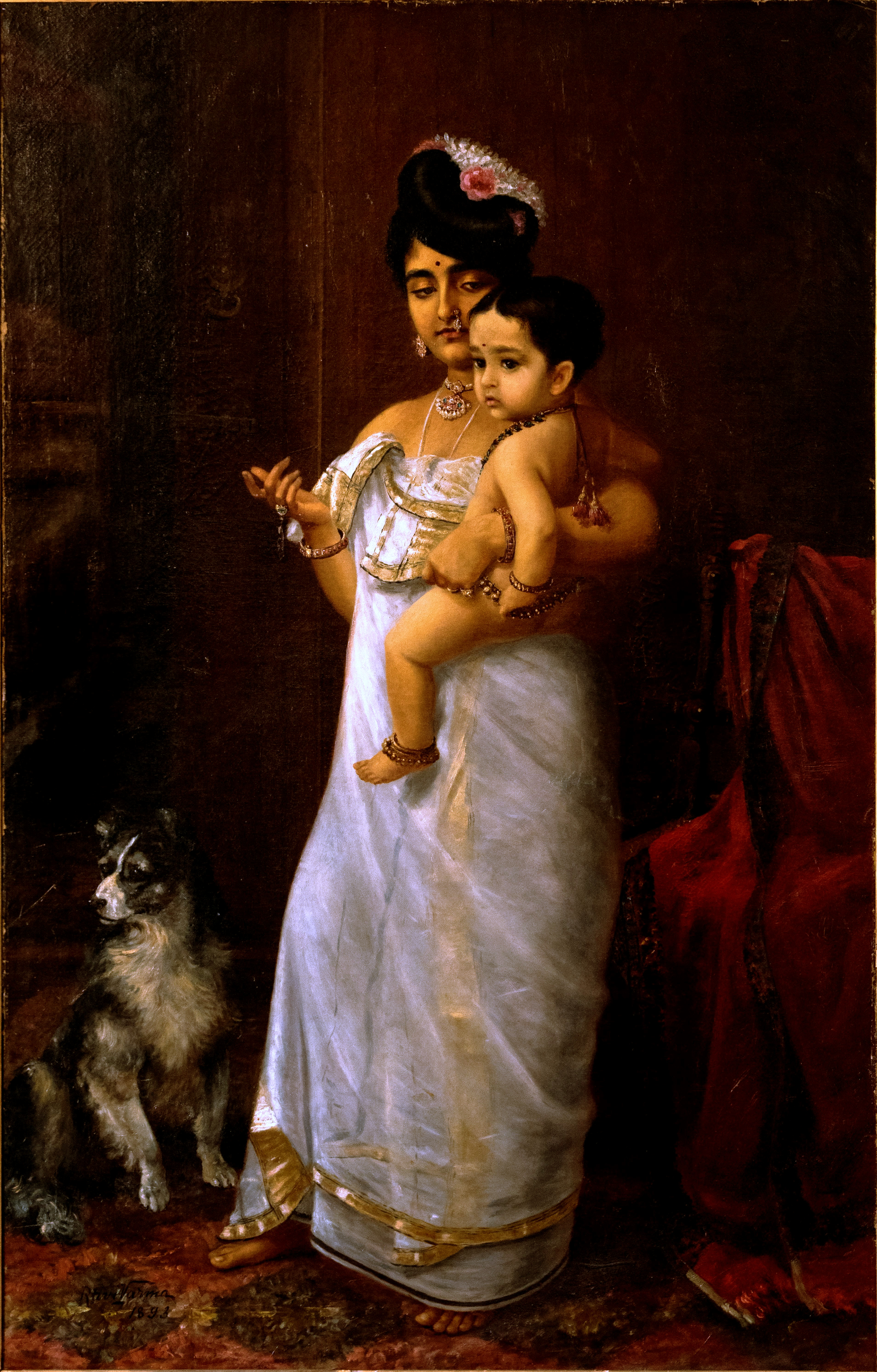
Nair woman wearing a mundum neriyatum, painting by Raja Ravi Varma

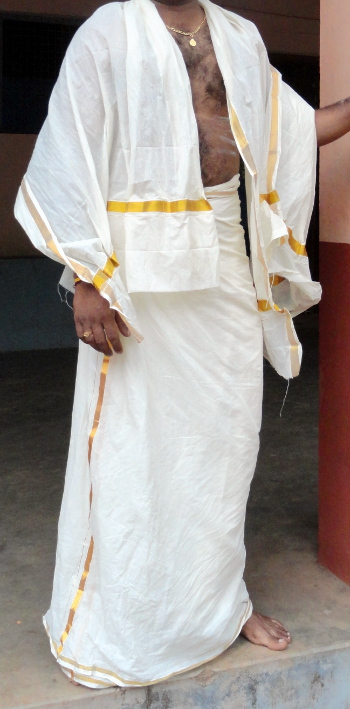
A man wearing mundu and melmundu

The mundu (Malayalam: muṇṭŭ; pronounced [muɳɖɯ̽]) is a garment worn around the waist in the Indian states of Kerala, Tamil Nadu, the Lakshadweep archipelago, and the Indian Ocean island nation of Maldives. It is closely related to sarongs like dhotis and lungis. It is normally woven in cotton and coloured white or cream. The colour is dependent on whether the cotton is bleached or unbleached. A khadaṟ muṇṭŭ is made using handlooms. When unbleached, the mundu is called nēriyatu. In modern times, two types of mundu are prevalent—the single and the double. A single mundu is wrapped only once around the waist, while the double one is folded in half before wearing. A mundu is usually starched before use.

== Men ==
A mundu usually has a line of comparatively thicker cloth woven into it near the border called the kara. The kara can be coloured and comes in various sizes. There is also double coloured and ornamental kara (a strip of colour at the end of the mundu). For more ceremonial occasions (like weddings), a mundu has a golden embroidery known as kasavu. The wearer highlights the 'kara' by carefully folding the end of the mundu. Unspoken rules of etiquette govern the way the mundu is worn. Muslim men wear the mundu facing left side (kara facing left side), Christian and Hindu men wear the kara facing the right side. Mundu is compulsory in Hindu culture especially when Hindu men are entering into a Goddess Temple.Also Muslim men prefer to wear mundu with different colours of Kara while its a compulsion for Hindu men to wear mundu with golden kara

The melmundu is an upper garment similar to the nēriyatu or tunḍŭ. that is worn by women; 'mundu' and 'melmundu' are part of the traditional Malayali costume worn by men.

Despite the considerable influence of western dressing forms in South Indian culture, Hindu traditional ceremonies of Kerala (some Hindu castes in other south Indian states) it is mandatory for the men to wear the Mundu. For Hindu weddings, men have to wear Mundu along with either shirt or a mel mundu. Mundu along with utarīyam is worn during religious occasions by Kerala Brahmins. It is also considered appropriate for men to wear Mundu during their visits to the temples and attending religious functions, though it is not mandatory at all places. However, it is a mandatory requirement to wear mundu and mel mundu for men to visit some famous temples in Kerala like the Guruvayur Temple, the Padmanabhaswamy Temple) etc. For the convenience of devotees, temple managements may provide these on rent in the temple premises.

== Women ==
A variant called a mundum neriyatum is used more often by women. The mundum neriyatum is a set of two mundus, both having matching kara. The set contains a lower garment similar to those worn by men. The upper mundu, worn with a blouse, is wrapped once around the waist and upper body and left hanging from the left shoulder, resembling a sari. This is often called a set-mundu. This is usually worn during festivals or special occasions.

Another variant called a chattayum mundum is worn by Syrian Christian (Nasrani) women. The chaatayum mundum is a two piece traditional attire consisting of the chatta and mundu. Both garments are traditionally white in colour. This attire is often seen worn by Margamkali performers in the present day.

A veshti is a small piece of cloth (generally put on the shoulders) along with a mundu, which is worn in Kerala amongst Malayalis for formal occasions.

== Kerala Lungi ==
In Kerala, the lungi, also called kaili or kaili muṇṭŭ, is worn by both men and women. Labourers prefer to wear lungis while working. Most men in Kerala use lungi as casual wear or as a house dress, as it is quite comfortable to wear. Lungis are generally colourful, and with varying designs. They are not worn during occasions such as weddings or other religious ceremonies. Saffron-coloured lungis (kāvi muṇṭŭ) are also commonly worn by men.

== See also ==
- Dhoti
- Mundum neriyatum
- Sarong
- Veshti
