= Parichamuttukali =

Martial art dance form from the Indian state of Kerala

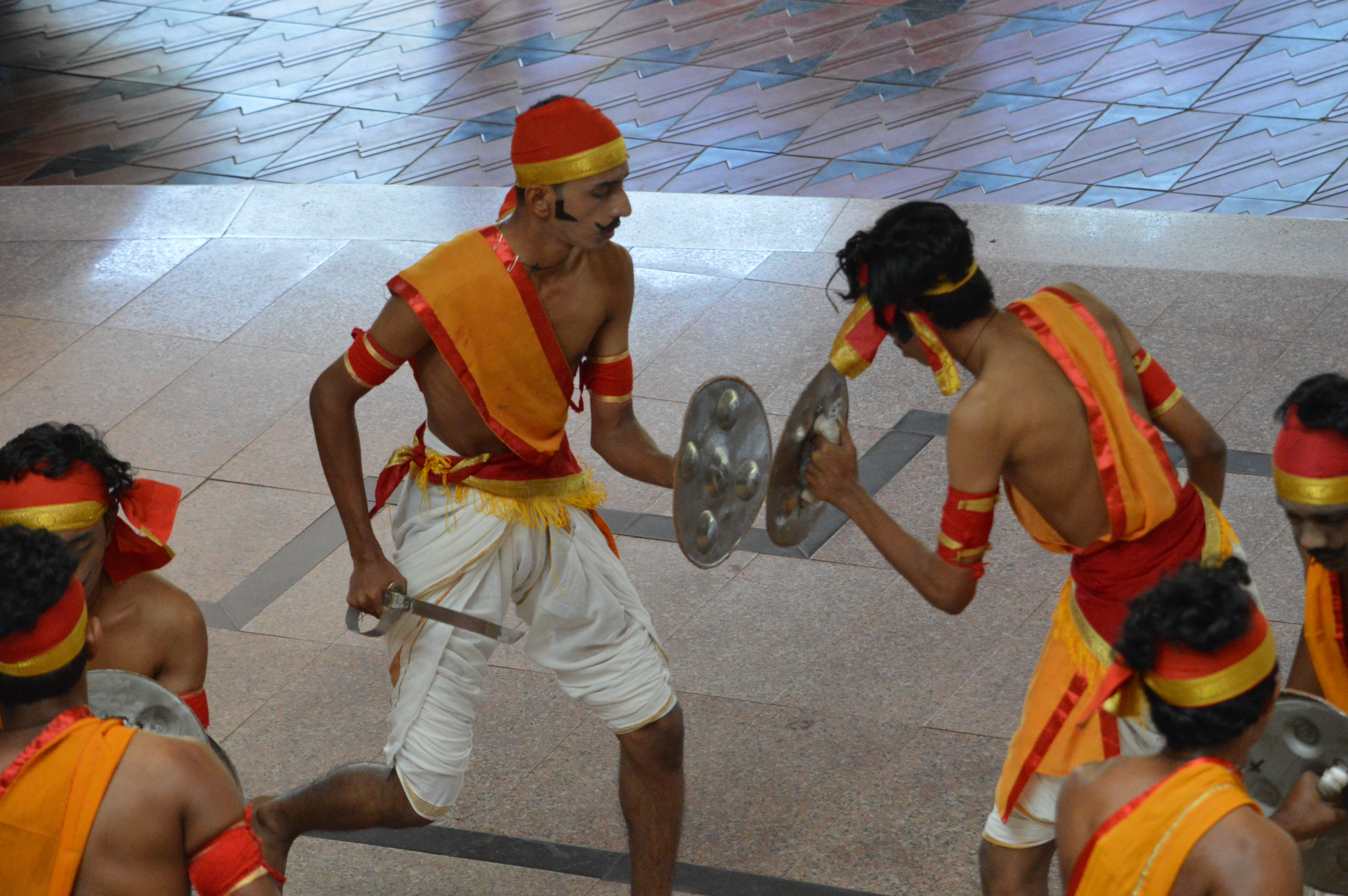
- A Parichamuttukali performance

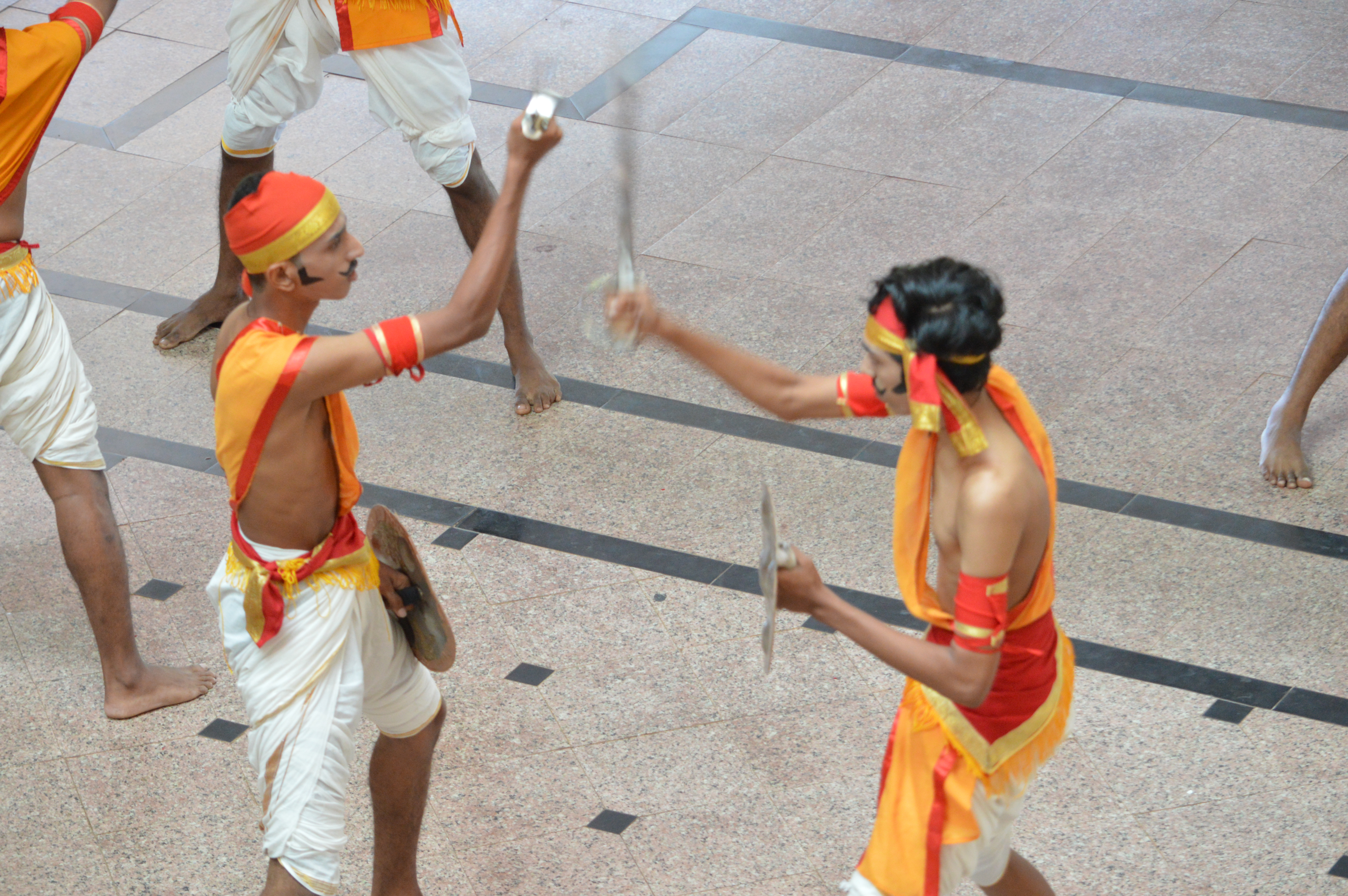

Parichamuttu Kali is an Indian martial-arts dance form of Kerala. It is practiced by the Saint Thomas Syrian Christians, who trace their origins to the evangelistic activity of Thomas the Apostle in the 1st century, and by the Latin Catholics of Malabar, who reside in the coastal regions of Kerala. It is performed by men bearing swords and shields and follows the movements and steps of Kalarippayattu. This dance is closely related to Margam Kali. Parichamuttu Kali was also performed by Harijans.

== Etymology ==
The first term in the name is a compound of the Malayalam words paricha, shield, and muttuka, bring them close to each other. The second part, kali, means "play". In this case, the play refers to how the dance is a mock performance as opposed to ankam which means "fight".

== History ==
The martial nature of these dances appear to come from 11th century 'suicide squad' soldiers in feudal Kerala called "Chavettu Pada". These were employed by the Cheras on multiple occasions and eventually lead to the defeat of the Cholas. This military unit style was employed in the following centuries by feudal overlords. Squad members often dedicated themselves to deities worshipped in local temples and viewed battle with the enemy as orders given by a god or goddess. These men were rigorously trained and where often maintained in peace time as security forces for notable temples.

The origin of the Parichamuttu Kali in particular can be traced back to ancient days when Kalarippayattu, a martial art of Kerala, was in vogue. Though it was not until the 16th century where the dance became fully differentiated from other forms of dance based on Kalari.

== Performance ==
The dancers are usually dressed in a white loin cloth with red wrist bands and sing in chorus as they dance. The performers dance with sword and shield in their hands. This garb and the movements of the dance are evocative of the dress and movement of Kalari. The group is usually headed by a leader called Asan or chief around whom the rest of the dancers perform or who sings and chimes bells from the sidelines. The dance used to be performed as a religious offering but is nowadays gaining popularity as a Syrian Christian entertainment art. This is usually performed at special church gatherings and other special occasions such as Onam.

The dance can range from tame and slow to wildly acrobatic with flips within a single performance as the pace is dictated by the rhythm of the music.

The songs sung during performances begin with a tribute to God and then moves to focus on another Christian topic. These often include praises of saints popular in Kerala such as St. George and St. Sebastian, among others. In modern performances, the Asan or chief is either singing outside of the circle as the dancers process around a Nilavilakku, a brass oil lamp traditional in southern India. Parichamuttu kali emphasizes a radial symmetry as the dancers process about the center point of the circle. The songs used in these Syrian Christian dances often have a very subtle western influence while retaining a traditional folkish tune.

== Modern day ==
Currently both Parichamuttukali and Margamkali are included in the State Youth Festival of Kerala. This makes these art forms a competitive item in the Four-tier system (i.e. School, Sub District, Revenue and State level) Youth festival. As of 2024, the dance is most prominently practiced in the central district of Palakkad, southern districts of Kottayam and Ernakulam, and Malappuram in the north.

== See also ==
- Margamkali
- Chavittu Nadakam
