= Nilavilakku =

Traditional lamp used in South India

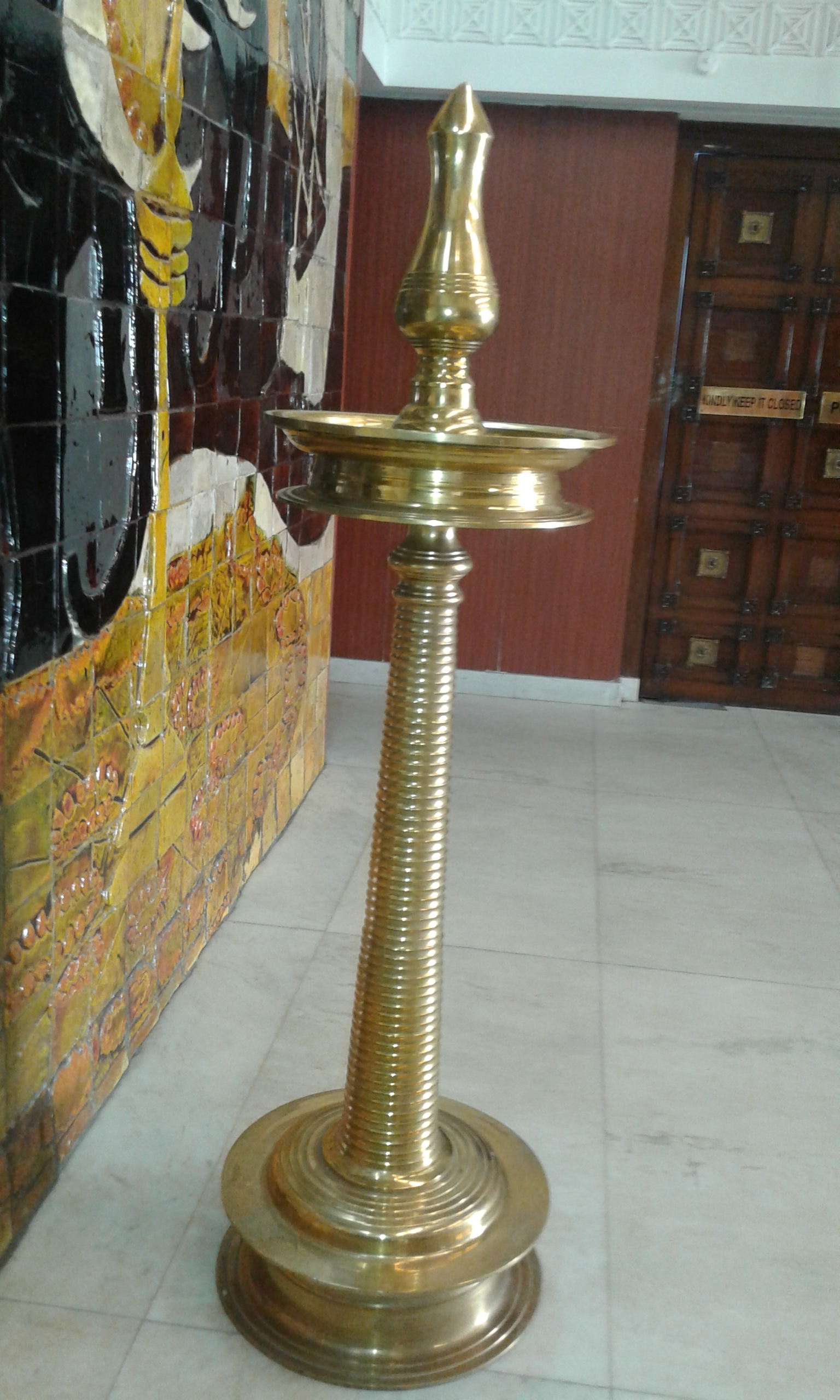
Nilavilakku lamp from Kerala.

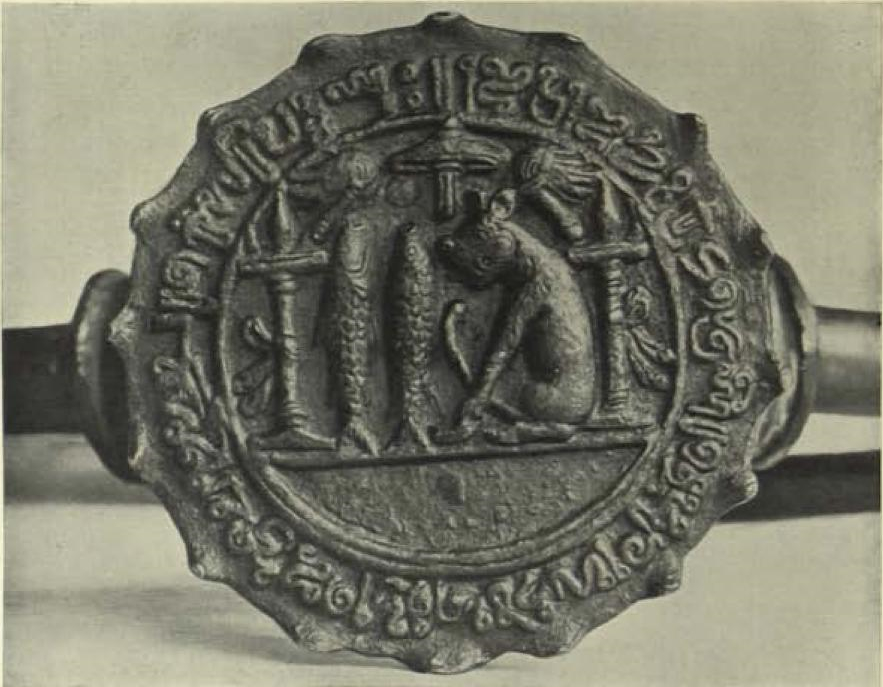
Seal of Chola Dynasty with two lamps, fish and tiger, 10th century.

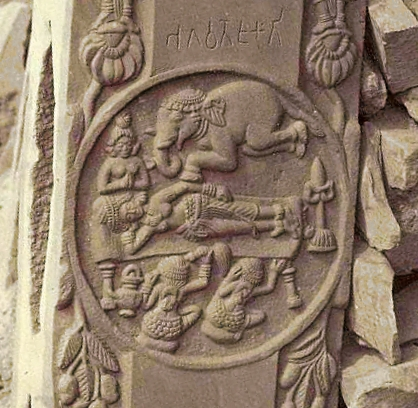
Lamp depicted on relief, 300–200 BCE.

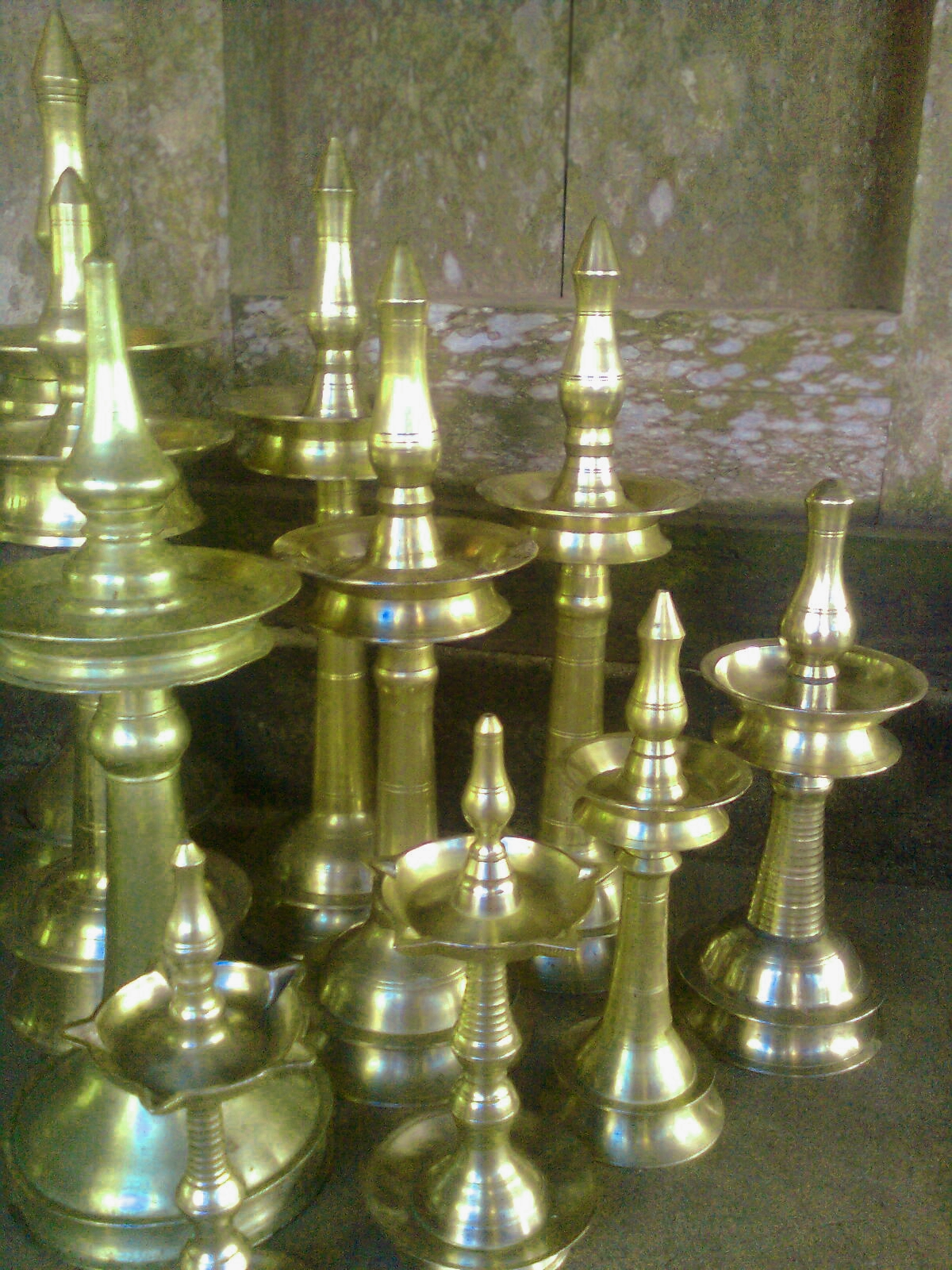
Nilavilakku

Nilaviḷakku Malayalam Pronunciation is a traditional floor lamp used commonly in Kerala, India. Similar regional variations in India, Nepal and Sri Lanka include Kuthuviḷakku (குத்துவிளக்கு) in Tamil Nadu, Kundulu in Andhra Pradesh and Telangana, Deepada Kamba (ದೀಪದ ಕಂಬ) in Karnataka It is called Panas (पनास) in Nepali, Samai (समई) in Maharashtra, in Odisha its called Pilisajā/Pilibeṛhi (ପିଲିସଜା / ପିଲିବେଢ଼ି), in Sinhalese it is called Pahana (පහණ) and Kukula Pahana (කුකුළා පහන). The traditional lamps, which are lit during every auspicious occasion, at homes and temples during prayer rituals, and on festive occasions.

== Etymology ==
Nilam in the Malayalam/Tamil language means floor or the ground and vilakku means lamp.

== Usage ==
=== History ===
Vilakku/dīpam (lamp) is one of five accessories of religious worship in Hinduism, Jainism and Buddhism; others being puṣpa (flowers), dhūpa (incense), gandhā (sandalwood paste) and nivedya (food). Worshipping deities with these five accessories is generally considered as a way for achieving the four ends of human life; dharma, artha, kama and moksha.

Vilakku lamps are used for various ceremonies, at home shrines, temples, weddings, and other festive occasions. A pair of lamps are typically placed at home shrines next to the deity for daily rituals. In Kerala, nilavilakku is integral to several rituals and ceremonies in Hindu families. As the sun sets, young girls of the family bring the lighted lamps to the verandah of the house, continue with evening prayers. In the evening, the ritual is repeated alongside evening prayers. In Hindu temples, various types of Nilavilakku like 'Kutthuvilakku', 'Thookkuvilakku' etc. are used and are very much related to the traditional beliefs and activities in Kerala.

Lighting the Nilavilakku on any occasion is believed to be auspicious. Nilavilakku plays an important role in the presentation of various art forms. The art forms are performed after lighting the lamp. In Kerala, many functions are inaugurated by lighting Nilavilakku. A special type of Nilavilakku, called Aal Vilakku is used in Temples of South India, especially in Kerala.

Nilavilakku is usually made of bronze or brass. Usually cotton wicks doused in oil or ghee are used for lighting the lamp. There are three ways of lighting the lamp. In one, only one wick is lit and is directed towards the deity or sacred space and in another, there are two lit wicks in two directions. The third alternative is with five wicks in five directions.

In Kerala, Saint Thomas Christians also keep Nilavilakku in their churches and homes. It is always found inside churches of the Orthodox denomination, such as the Jacobite Syrian Church, but is now also installed in Catholic places of worship. The ancient tradition was to place suspended oil lamps, or thookuvilakku, at the center of the naves. In churches, vilakkus are customarily filled with coconut oil. In a domestic context, the nilavilakku is conventionally lit and kept at the main front entrance of the home. Syrian Christian art forms like Margamkali and Parichamuttukali are performed around nilavilakku.

== Gallery ==
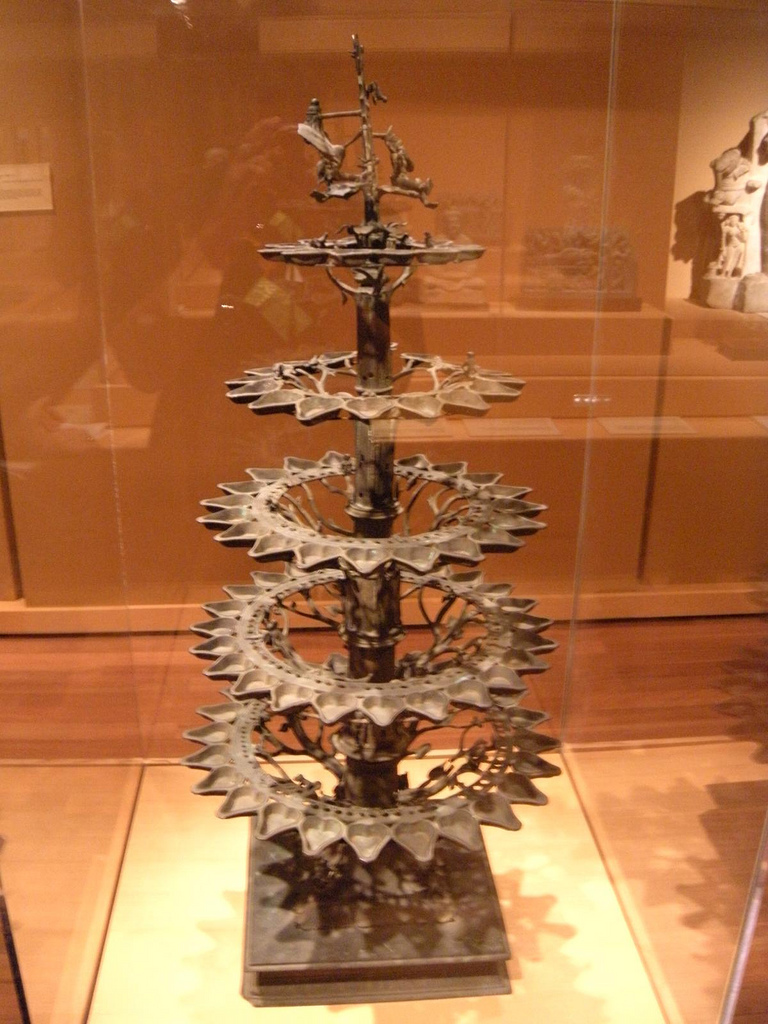
13th century lamp, Kerala

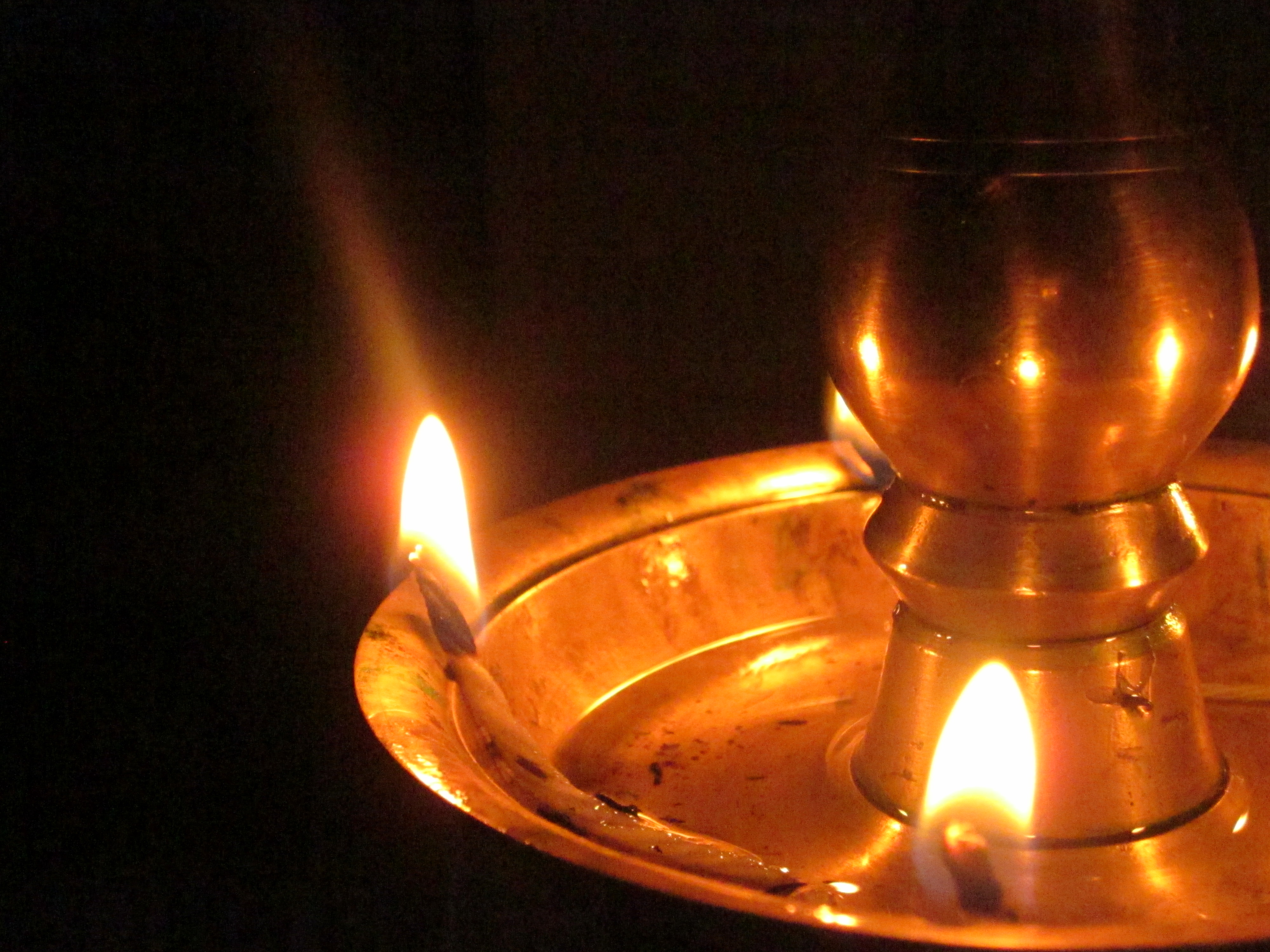
Nilavilakku lamp with cotton wicks

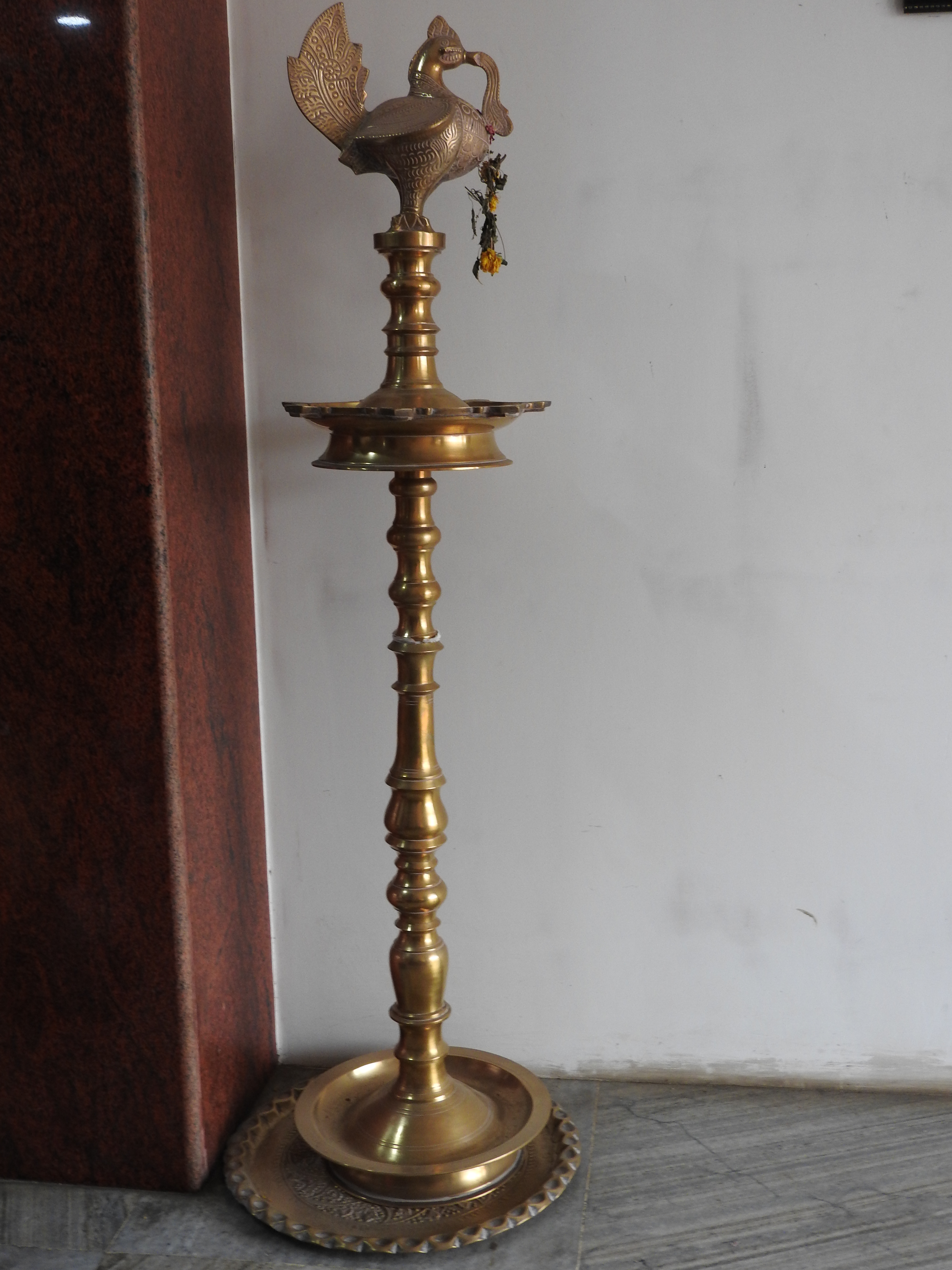
Kuthuvillaku, Tamil Nadu

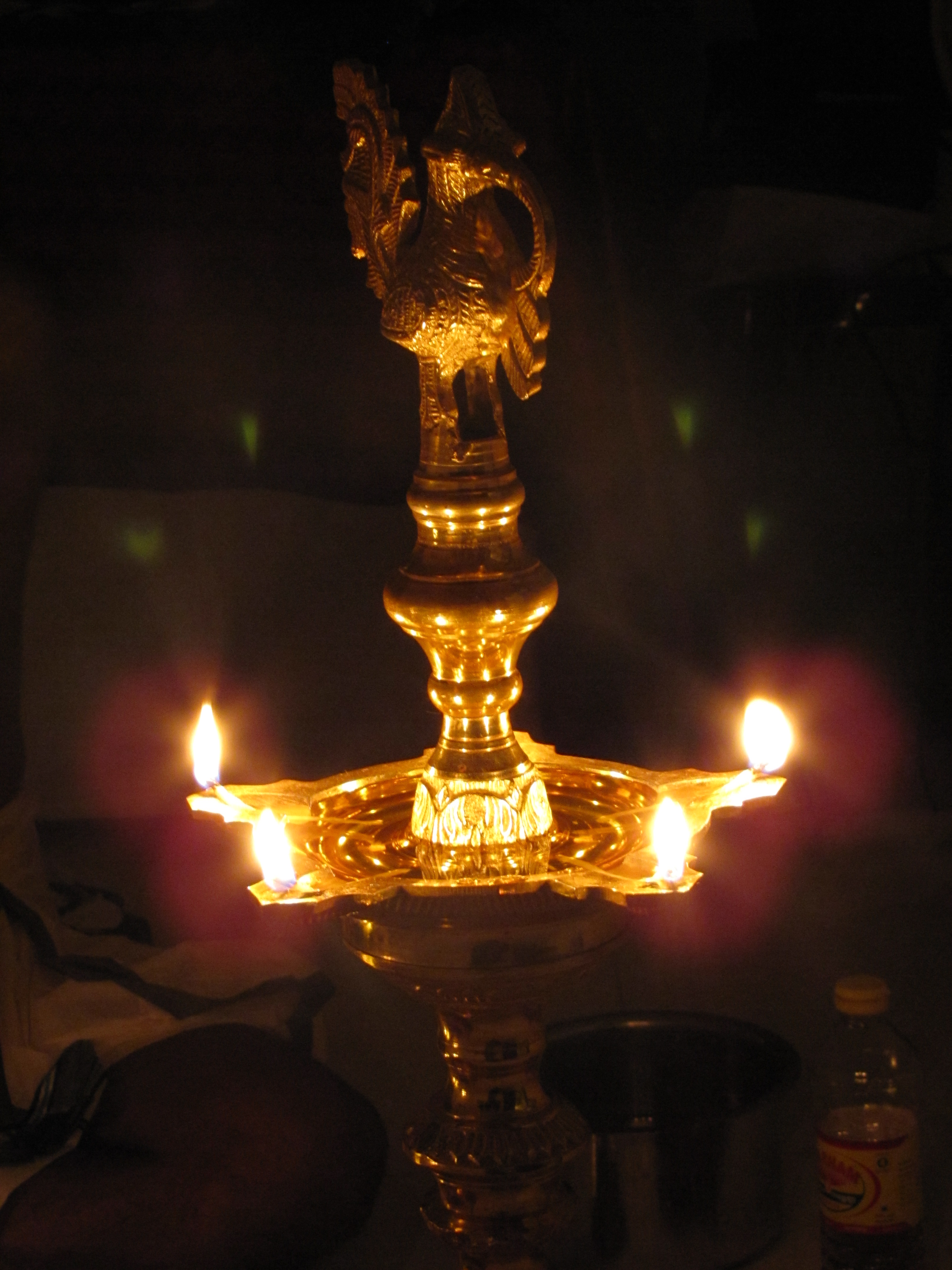
Kuthuvillaku, Tamil Nadu

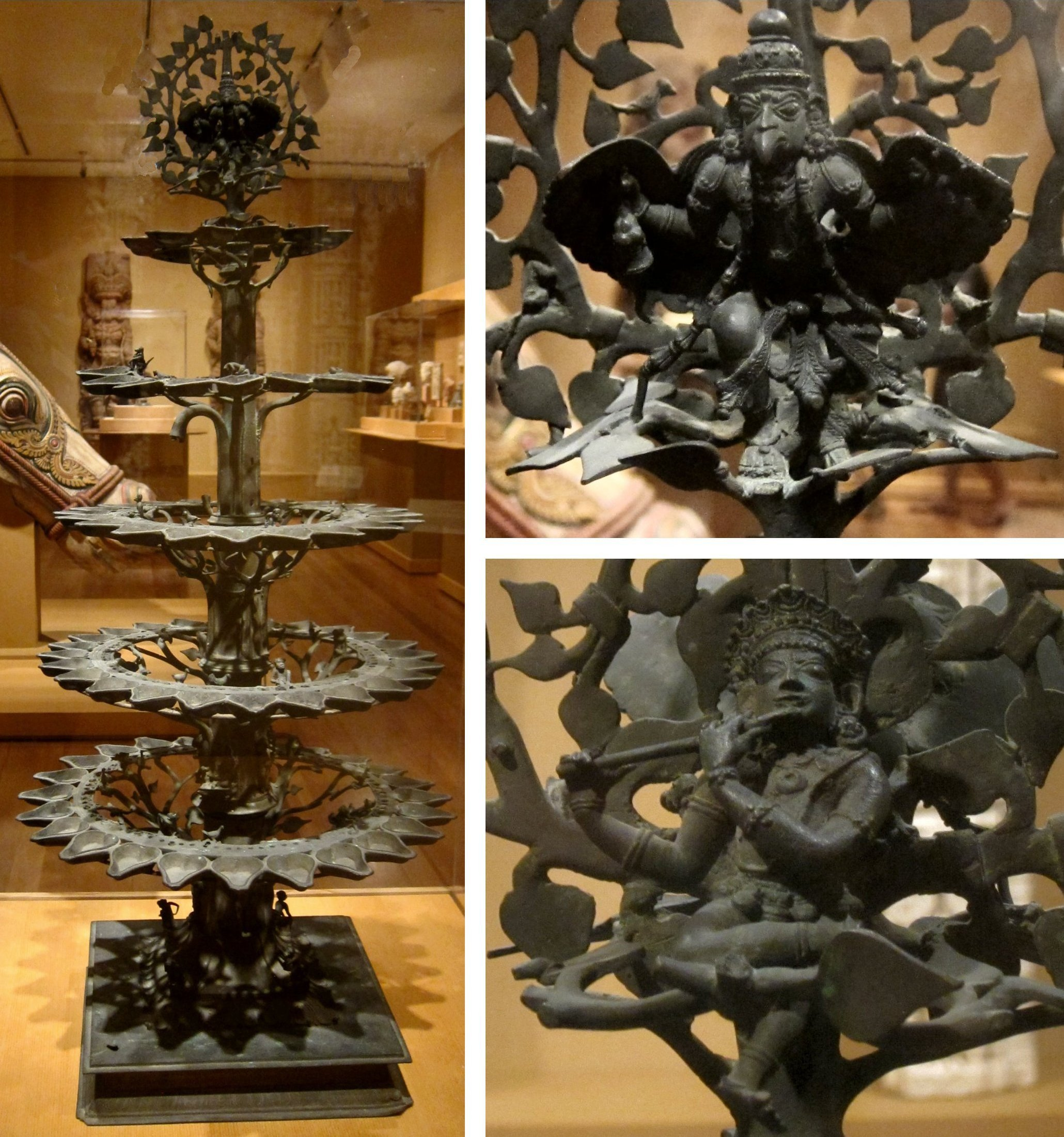
Bronze lamp in 13th century, Kerala

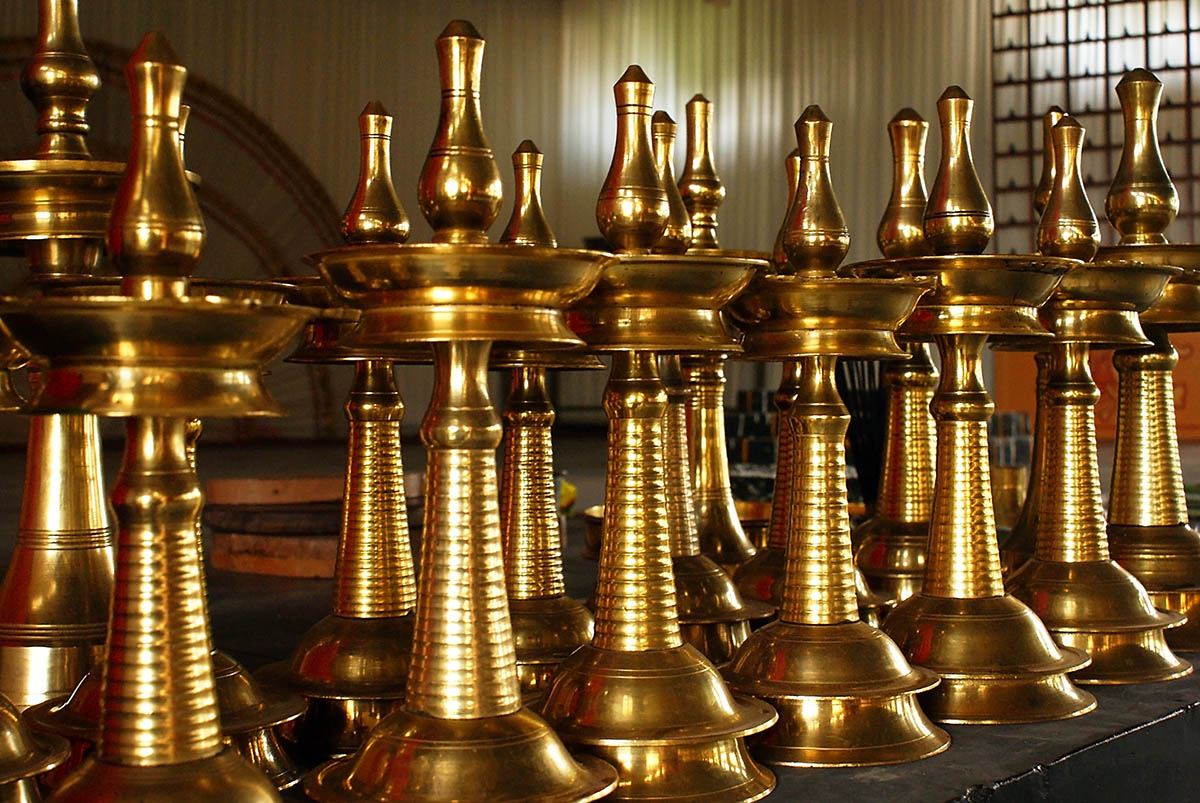
Nilavilakku lamps in typical Kerala style

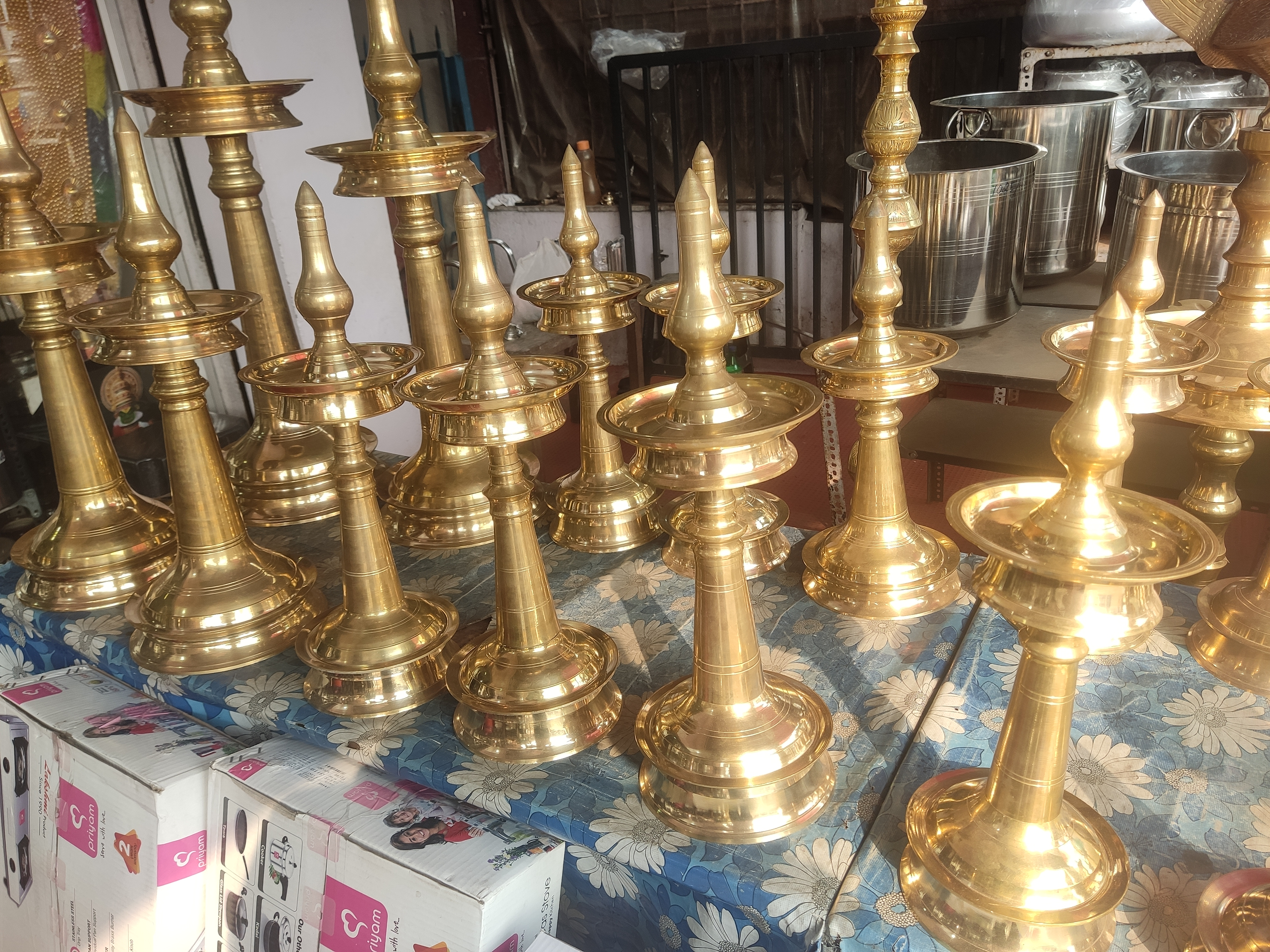
Nilavilakku lamps, Kerala

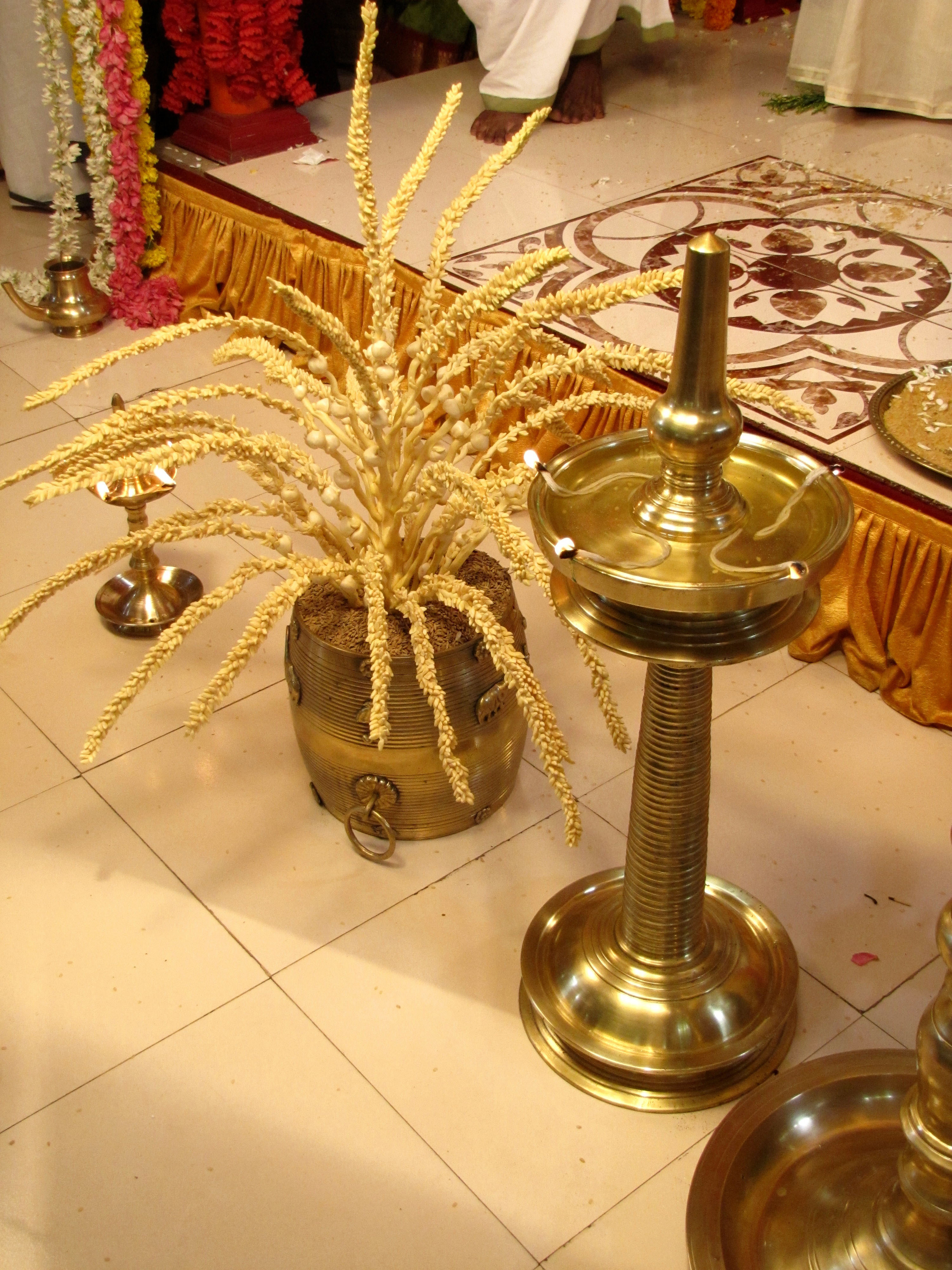
Nirapara and Nilavilakku

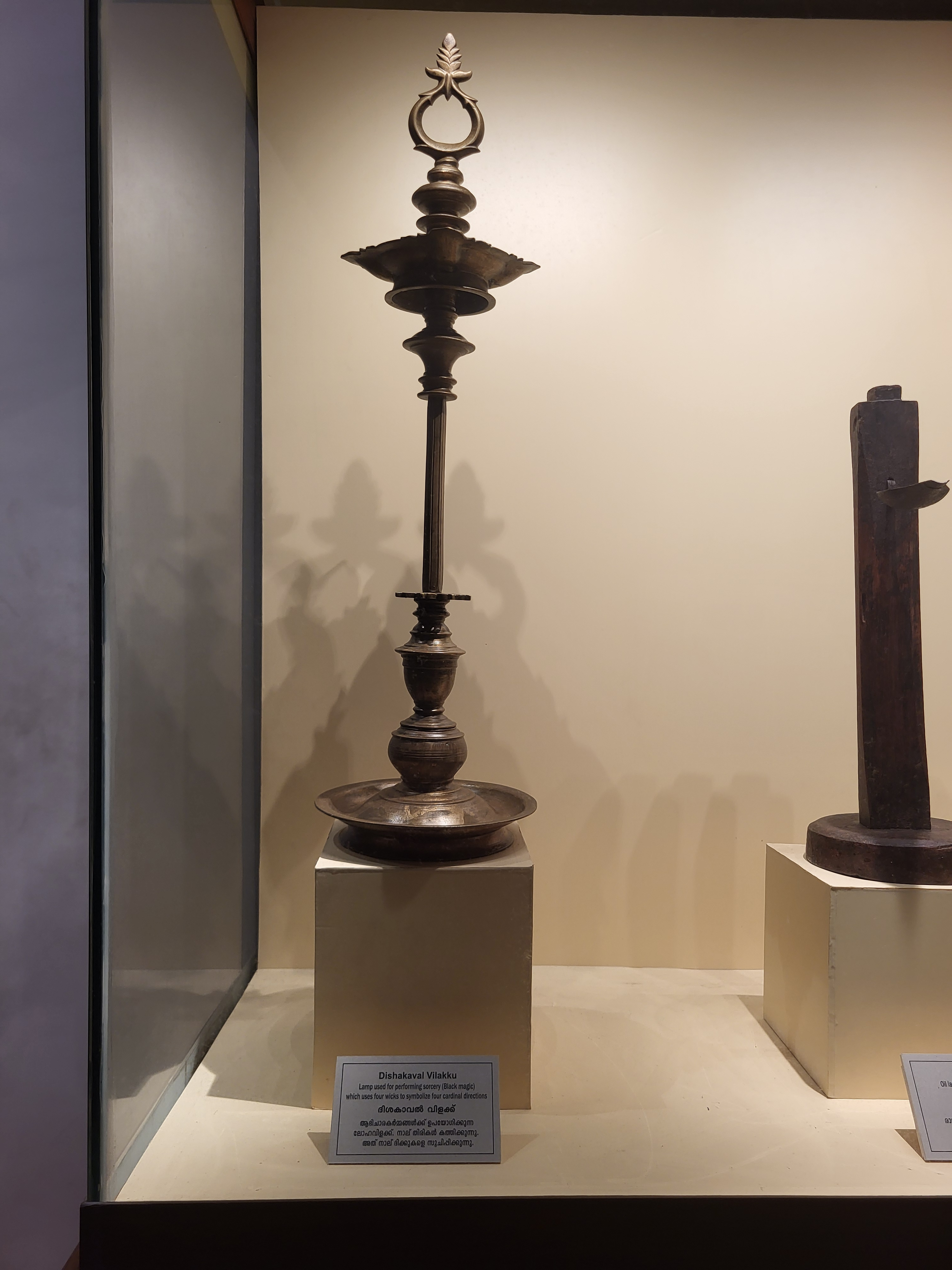
Dishakaval Vilakku

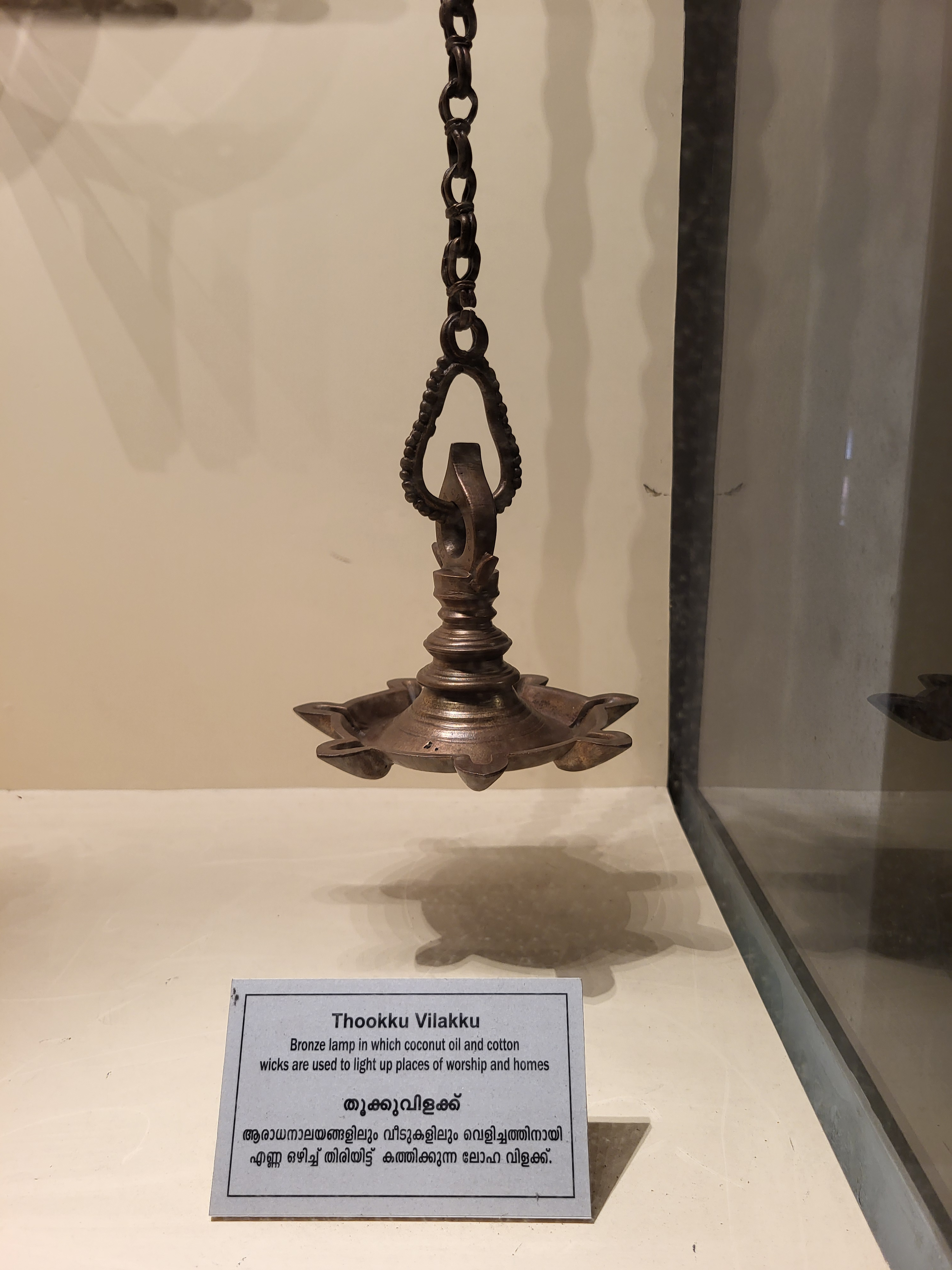
Thookku Vilakku or hanging lamp

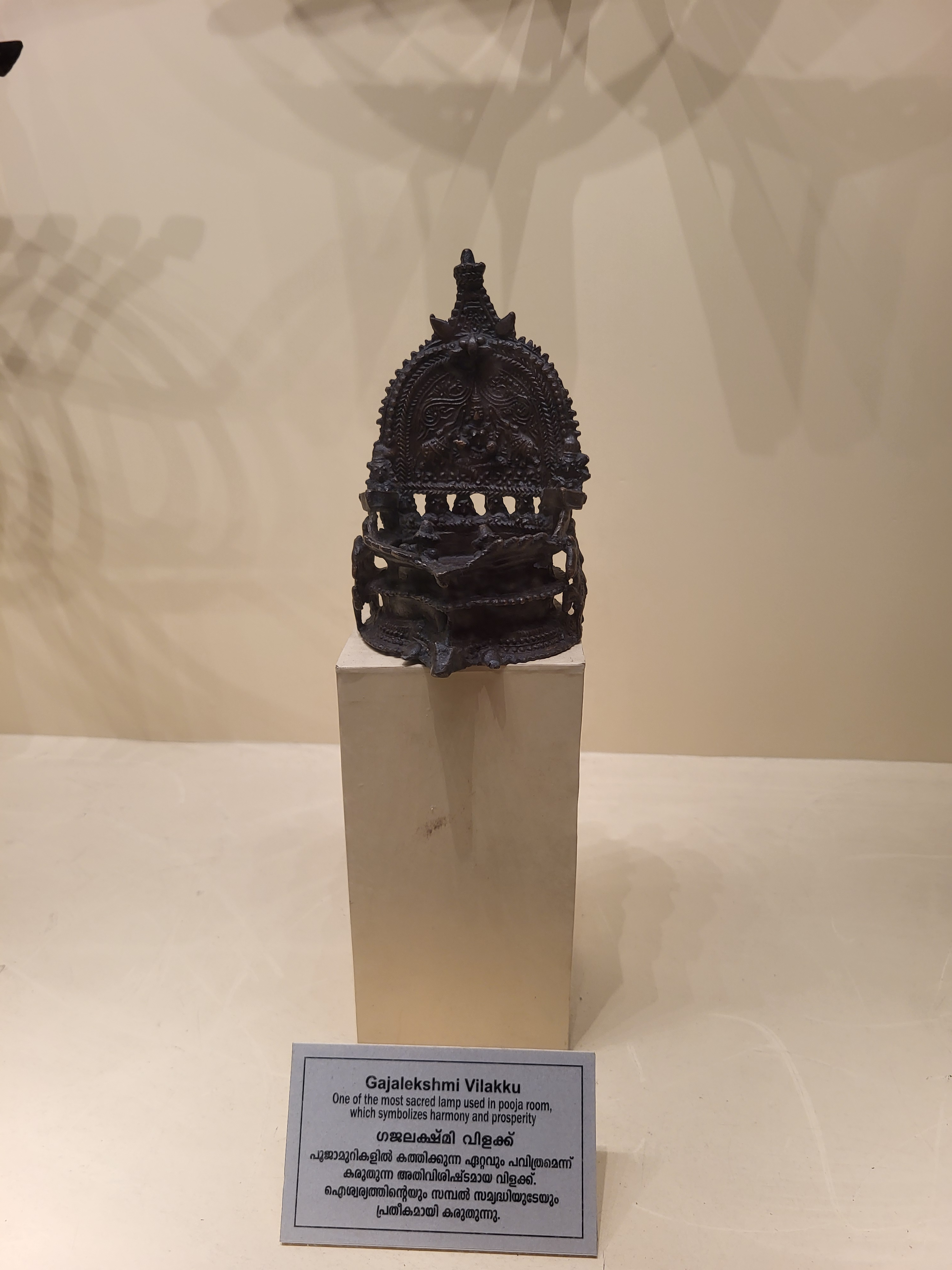
Gajalakshmi Vilakku

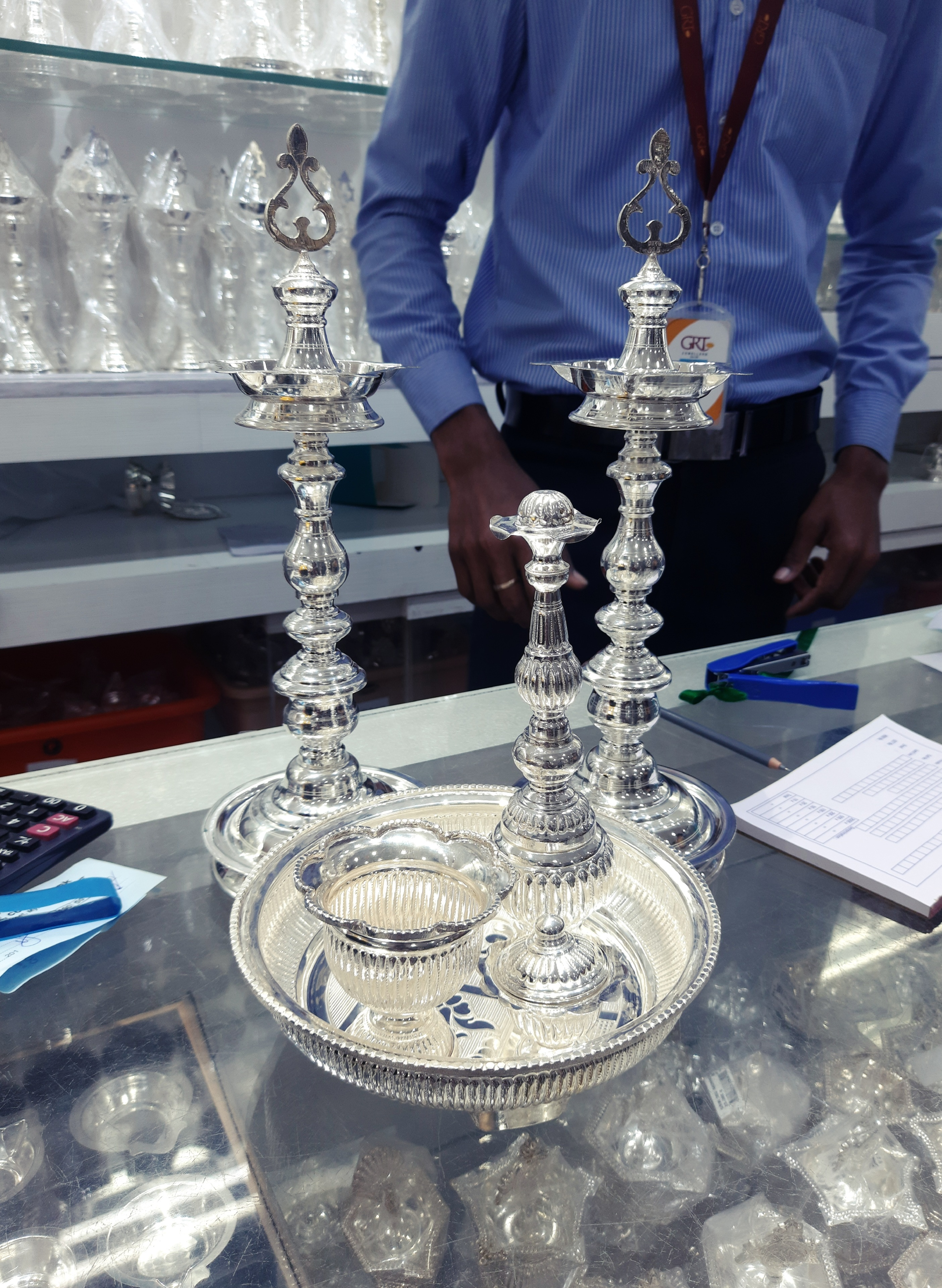
Silverware Vilakkus

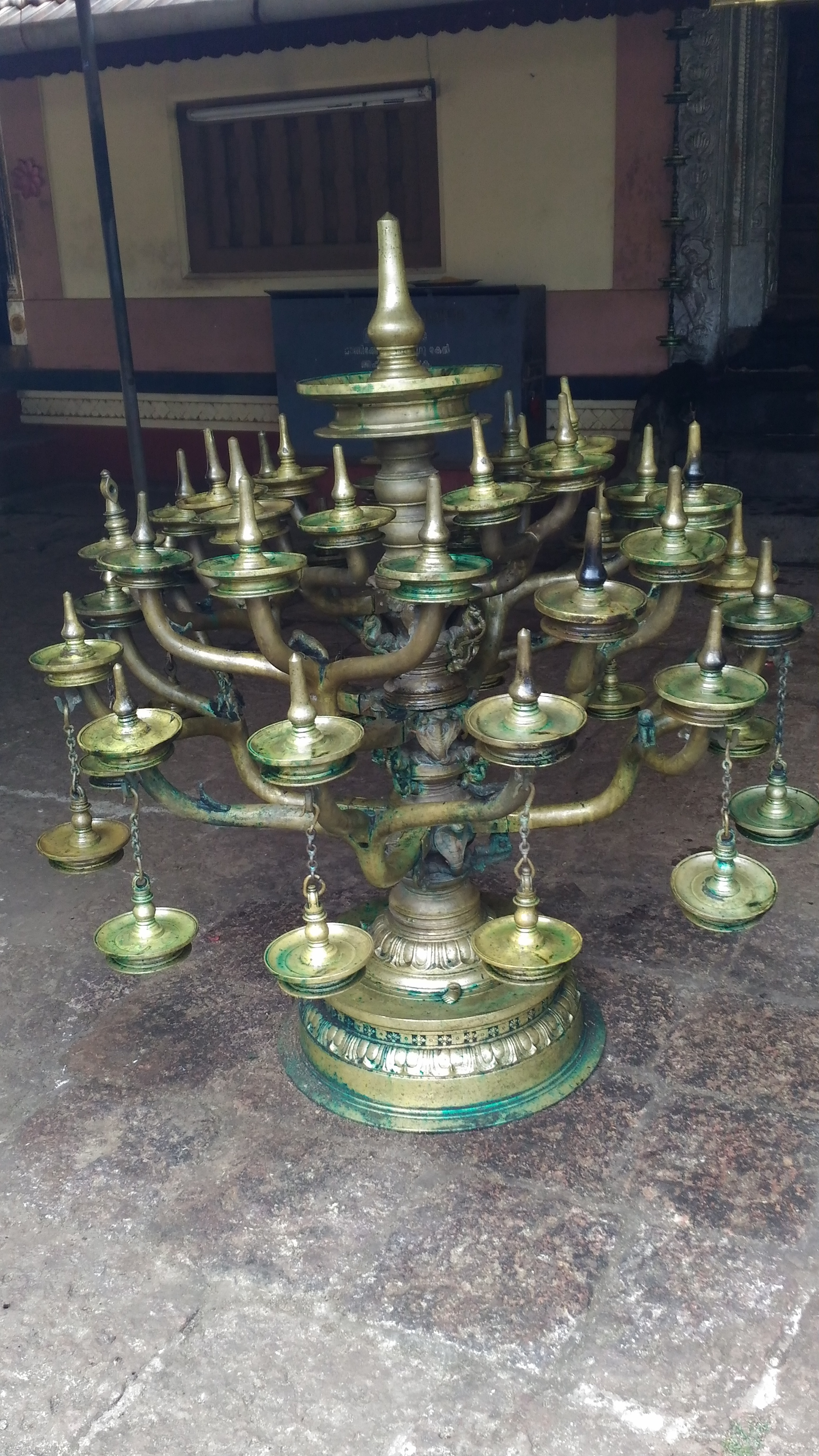
Bronze lamp used in Temples.

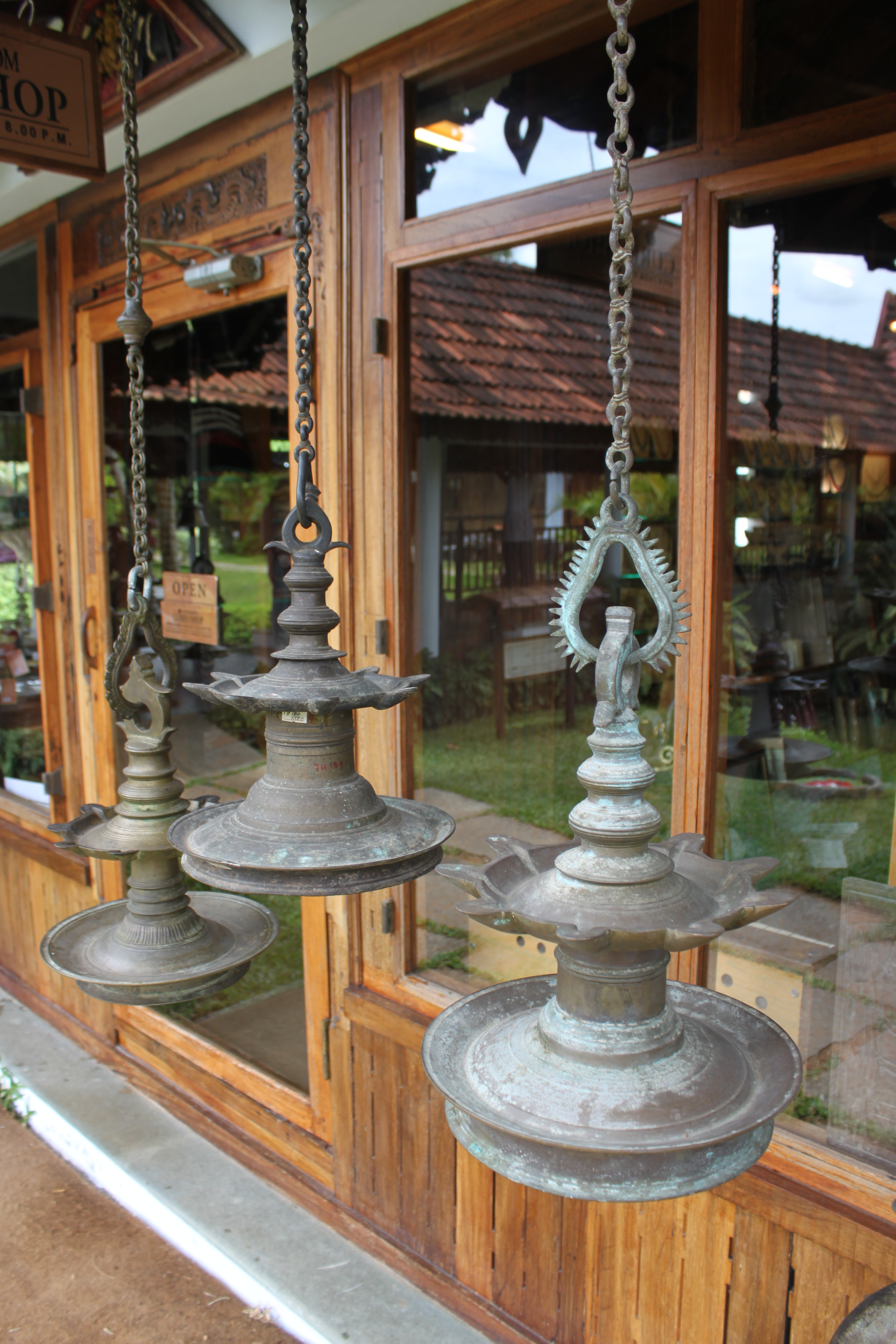
Thooku Vilakku

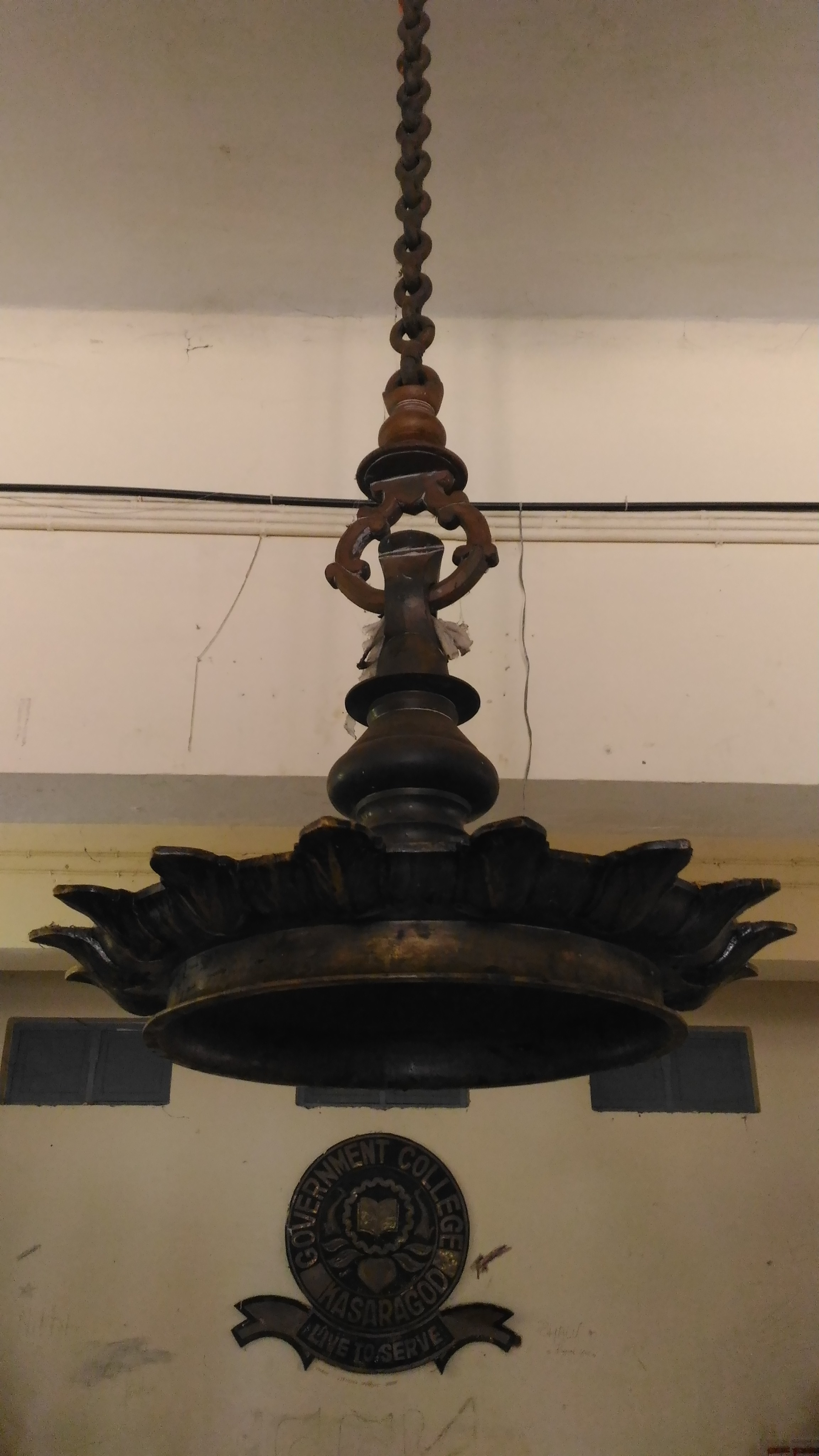
Thookkuvilakku hanging lamp

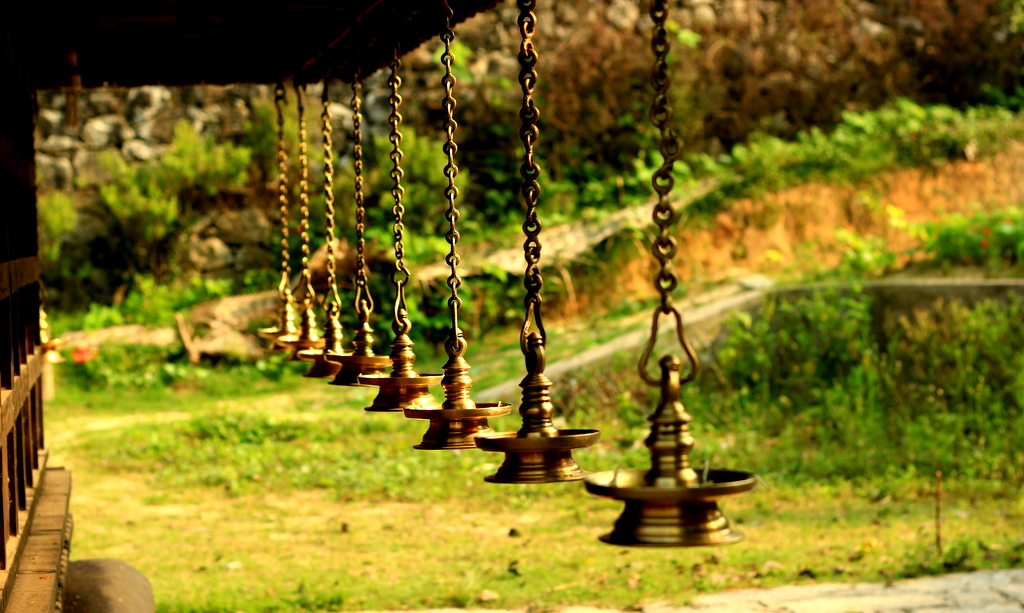
Thookkuvilakku hanging lamps

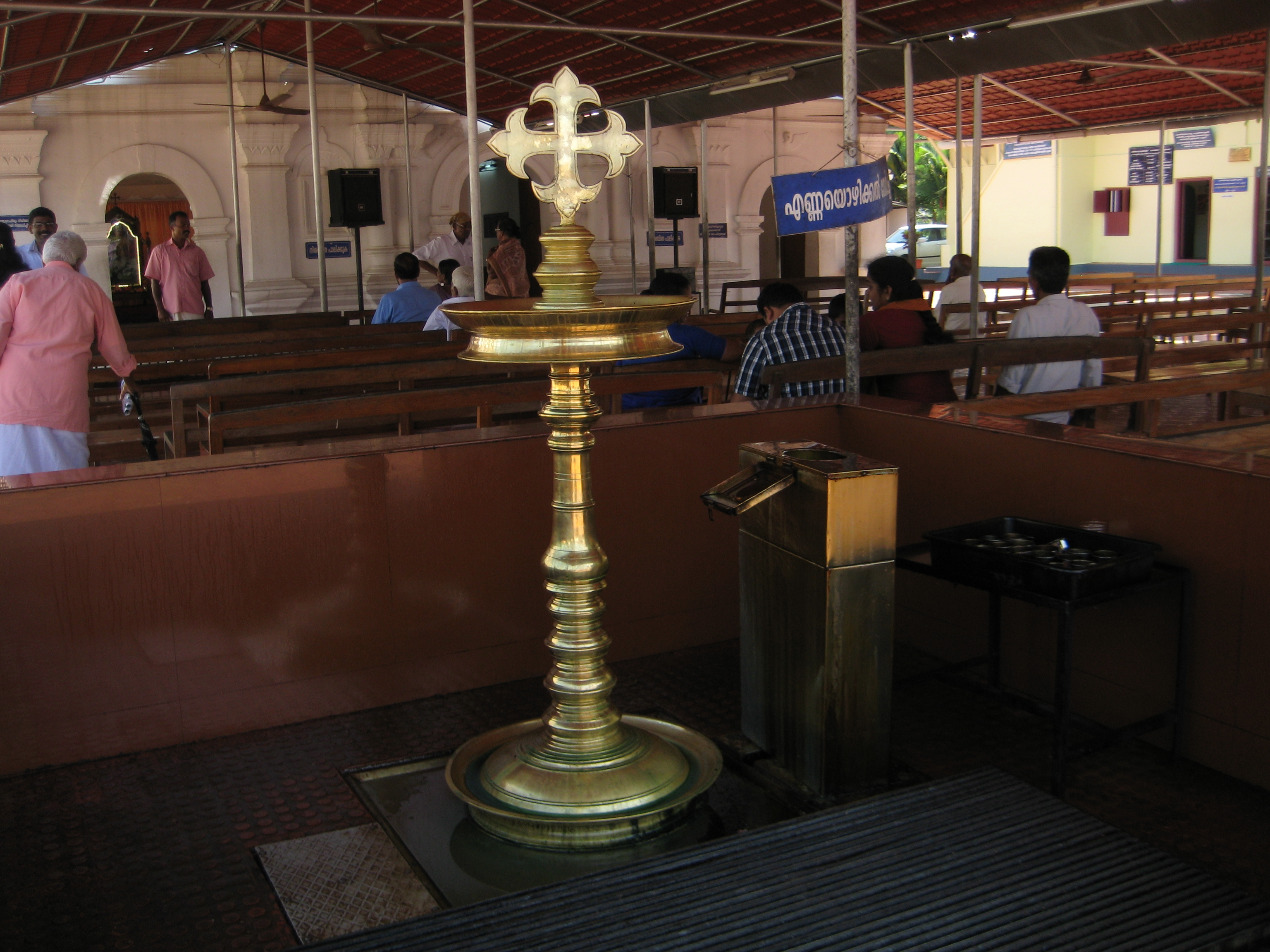
Nilavilakku in Church with Christian cross

== See also ==
- Other lamps
  - Butter lamp
  - Diya lamp
  - Nachiarkoil lamp
  - Sky lantern
  - Paper lantern
  - Types of Indian oil lamps
- Related topics
  - Aarti
  - Diwali
  - Rangoli
  - List of light sources
