= Margamkali =

Ancient Indian dance form from the state of Kerala

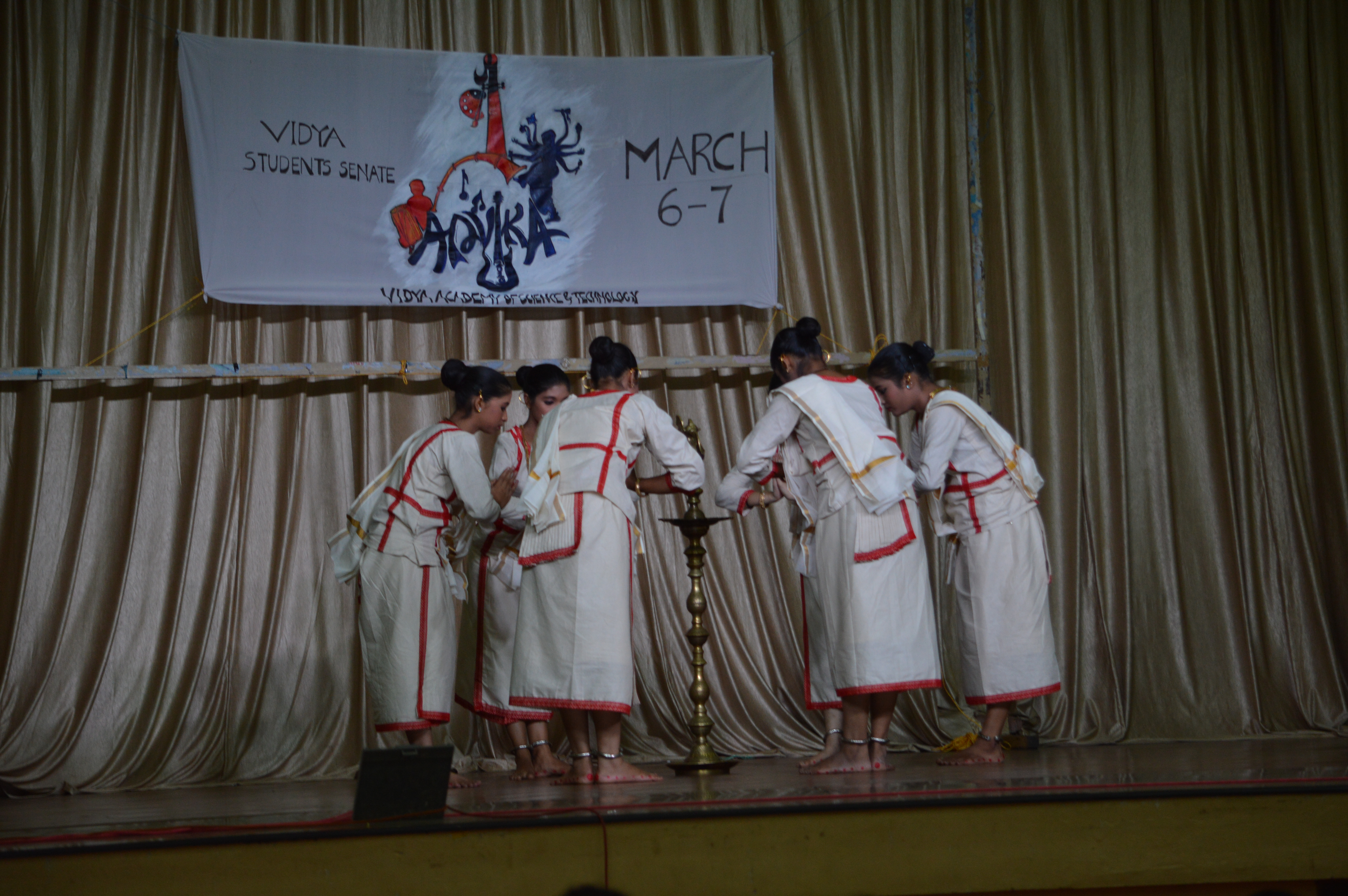
Margamkali performed during an arts & cultural fest.

Margamkali performed during a Syro-Malabar Nasrani wedding at Arakuzha.

Margamkali (Malayalam: മാർഗ്ഗംകളി) is an ancient Indian round dance of the Saint Thomas Christian community based in the state of Kerala. The dance is mainly practised and propagated by the endogamous sub-ethnic group known as the Knanaya or Southist Christians. The Margam Kali retells the life and missionary work of Thomas the Apostle, based on the 3rd-century apocryphal Acts of Thomas.

Historically different forms of the Margam Kali existed in practice among the Kerala Syrian Christians, a Saint Thomas Christian or Northist version and a Knanaya or Southist version. Historian Dr. Istvan Perczel notes that only the Knanaya version is in existence today, with its 14 stanza form written by the Knanaya priest Anjilimootil Itti Thomman in the 17th century. The prototype of Margamkali is composed of 14 stanzas (padas) which are derived from Syrian and Tamil words, and they got to be included in its composition. Until the ninth century AD., Keralam was a part of Tamilakam and the language of the Kerala region was Tamil or Middle Tamil. Gradually Malayalam came under the influence of Sanskrit and Prakrit with the spread of Aryan influence. But some scholars states that those songs are written in a language which is neither pure Malayalam of today nor the spoken Tamil of today, and this language is absolutely free of any Sanskrit terms,it might be Middle Tamil spoken in Chera Kingdom or Chentamil. There was a time when Syriac language was used as a trade language (Lingua Franca) in Kodungallur and its surroundings. At least from the fourth century, the Knanites as well as the rest of the Syrian Christians in Malabar used the Syriac language in their liturgical celebrations. They firmly believed that the Syriac language was sacred since Jesus Christ, his mother, and the Apostles used it, and the holy mass was instituted by Christ in that language. These were the reasons for the Syrian Christians of Kerala to maintain and use the Syriac language even in their cultural performances. The present day Margamkali songs have many Syriac liturgical words like maran (our Lord), alaha (God), mar thomma (St Thomas), malaka (angel), kandessa (Saint), ruha (spirit), nivyalanmar (prophets), Iso (Jesus), Mishiha (Christ) are seen in the lyrics. The Tamil words like meyu (body), peeli (dress). All these lead us back to an early period of the history of Malayalam literature, which had Tamil words aplenty. However, Persian and Portuguese words are not seen in the text. Those words might possibly have been borrowed from karintamil or Middle Tamil because Margamkali has close affinity with the Cindu kind of song composition, which was popular in Tamil language during the period (Karimbumkalayil).

== History ==
There are several opinions on the potential origin of Margamkali. They are:

1. It is traced back to Jewish wedding songs and dance from the diaspora. Scholars have found common origin among Malabar Jewish dance and songs and the dance form of Margamkali. In addition, scholars like P.M. Jussay and Dr Shalva Weil have found many similarities in the customs and rituals of Knanaya Christians and Malabar Jews.
2. It is derived from Sangam kali, a performance dance form of Brahmins.
3. It is derived from the Yathra Kali, a performance art of Nambudiri Brahmins in Kerala.

"Margam" means path or way or solution in Malayalam, but in the religious context it is known as the path to attain salvation. The process of conversion to Christianity was known as "Margam Koodal" until recently in Kerala. Much of this folk art is woven around the mission of St. Thomas, the Apostle. The original Margam Kali describes the arrival of St. Thomas in Malabar, the miracles he performed, the friendship as well as the hostility of the people among whom he worked, the persecution he suffered, the churches and crosses he put up in various places, etc. These details are incorporated in the various stanzas of the Margam Kali songs. Kerala's Margam Kali is an important element in the age-old and hallowed tradition of St Thomas among the Syrian Christians of Malabar Coast.

The disparity between the present condition of this form and the early days leads one to assume three important phases in the history of Margamkali. The first phase was the pre-colonization one in which this semi-theatrical form was performed by the Saint Thomas Christians during special occasions. Parichamuttukali (The sword and shield dance) was also a part of it. Later Synod of Diamper curbed and suppressed this native form. During the seventeenth century, due to the efforts of a Knanaya priest Itti Thomman Kathanar, the textual part of this form got certain upliftment and care. The Margamkali might have been edited and refashioned into the present fourteen stanza structure during this period. However, until the end of the nineteenth century the art form was not in common practice even though it did exist in some places. But at the end of the nineteenth and the beginning of the twentieth century, the form became popular once again, and some structural changes took place then. Masters such as Kalarikal Unni ashan, Indumoottil Kocheppu ashan, Indumoottil Kutto ashan were some of them who were responsible for this change and upheaval. By this time the Knanaya scholar Puttanpurikkal Uthuppu Lukose compiled and published Margamkali Pattukal in 1910. In 1924 the European priest and scholar Fr. Hosten S.J. witnessed the Margam Kali danced by the Knanaya of Kottayam and was enamored by the ancient artform. Subsequently, Hosten endeavored to present the dance at the Mission Exhibitions at the Vatican in 1925 by bringing these dancers to Rome, however this venture was met with mass resentment and disapproval from the Northist St. Thomas Christians who viewed the artform as being an "uncouth performance" and stated that if performed it "might ridicule all the St. Thomas Christians".

In the late 1900s the art form was heavily in decline among the St. Thomas Christian Community but the Knanaya community took upon the initiative to promote and further expand the art form. During the 1960s the St. Thomas Christian scholar of folk culture Dr. Chummar Choondal led a sociological survey of the Margam Kali and noted that the practice was solely of the Knanaya Community. Furthermore, Choondal found that all of the Margam teachers and groups of the time period were entirely Knanaya. The following analysis of the art-form was stated by Dr. Chummar Choondal.

“Knanaya Christians have the most ancient and varied art forms. Margamkali is their dance form. Generally, it is said that margamkali is said in vogue among the Syrian Christians, but a close and critical observation will show that the practice and propagation of margamkali were among the Knanites. During my research in the 1960s, I could not find this art form practiced in the regions like Trissur and Pala where the Syrians are thickly populated. The traditions of margamkali can thus by analyzed: 70% among Knanaya Catholics and 25% among Knanaya Jacobites.”

In the 1970s and 1980s the Knanaya priests Fr. George Karukaparambil and Jacob Vellian as well as scholar of folk culture Dr. Chummar Choondal undertook years of heavy research and study with the help of 33 Knanaya ashans or teachers of Margam Kali to revitalize the ancient art form. Through critical historical, musicological, and ethnochoreological evaluation this team of researchers systematized Margam Kali and promoted it among schools and cultural organizations as an item of competition in youth festivals and eventually presented it to Kerala's Minister of Education who introduced a 14 minute long documentary created by the team. In order to make sure Margam Kali would be an art form set in stone, the team looked for a formal center for the furthering or Margam Kali and allied Christian art forms. Mar Kuriakose Kunnasserry the Bishop of the Knanaya Diocese of Kottayam came to the aide of the team in 1995 and established Hadusa (Syriac for Dancing/Rejoicing), as an All India Institute of Christian Performing Arts which in part has forever aided the existence and prominence of Margam Kali today. Hadusa has released a text titled "Margam kali Aattaprakaaram" which is considered as an authentic reference material for this art form.

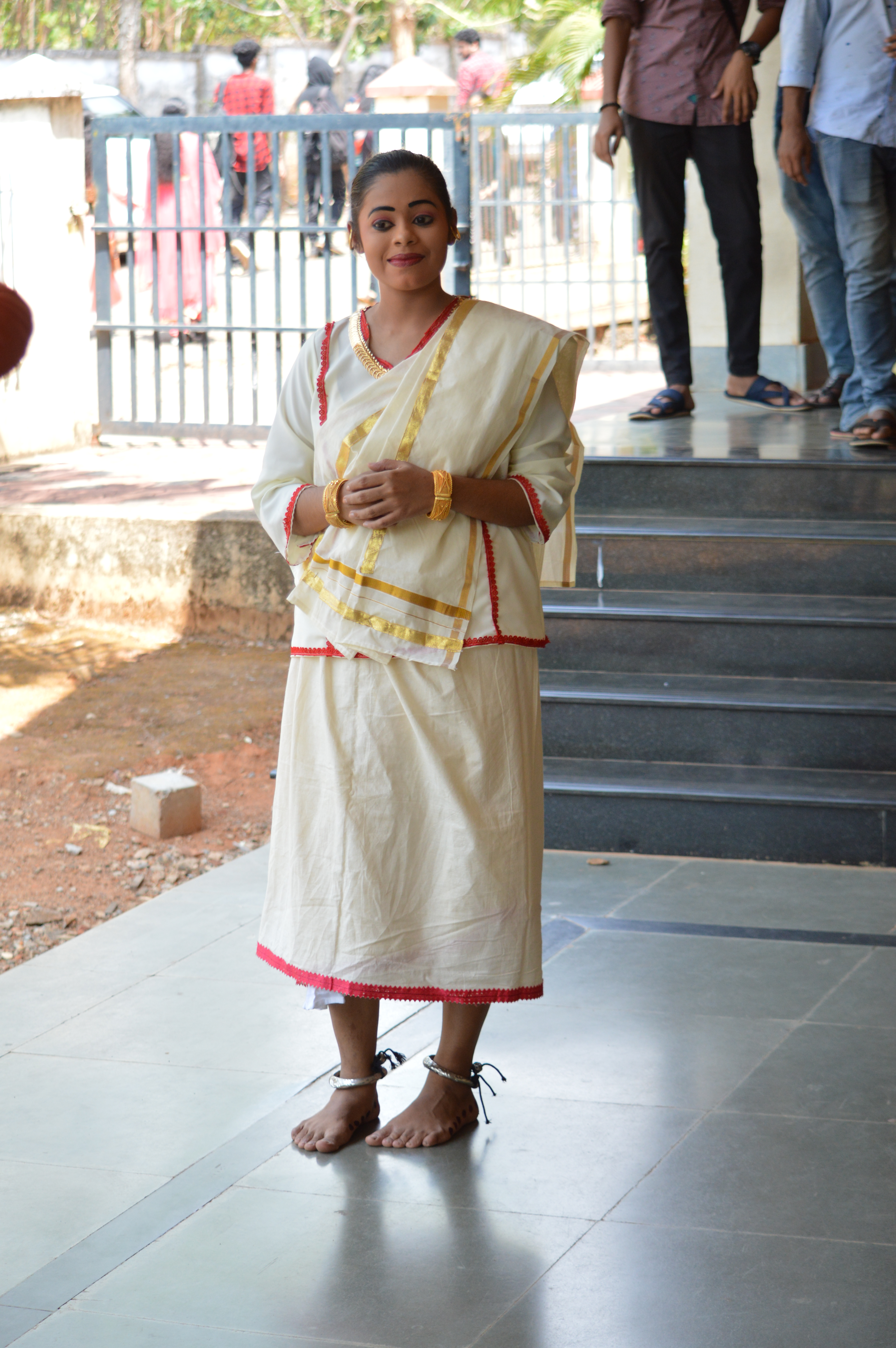
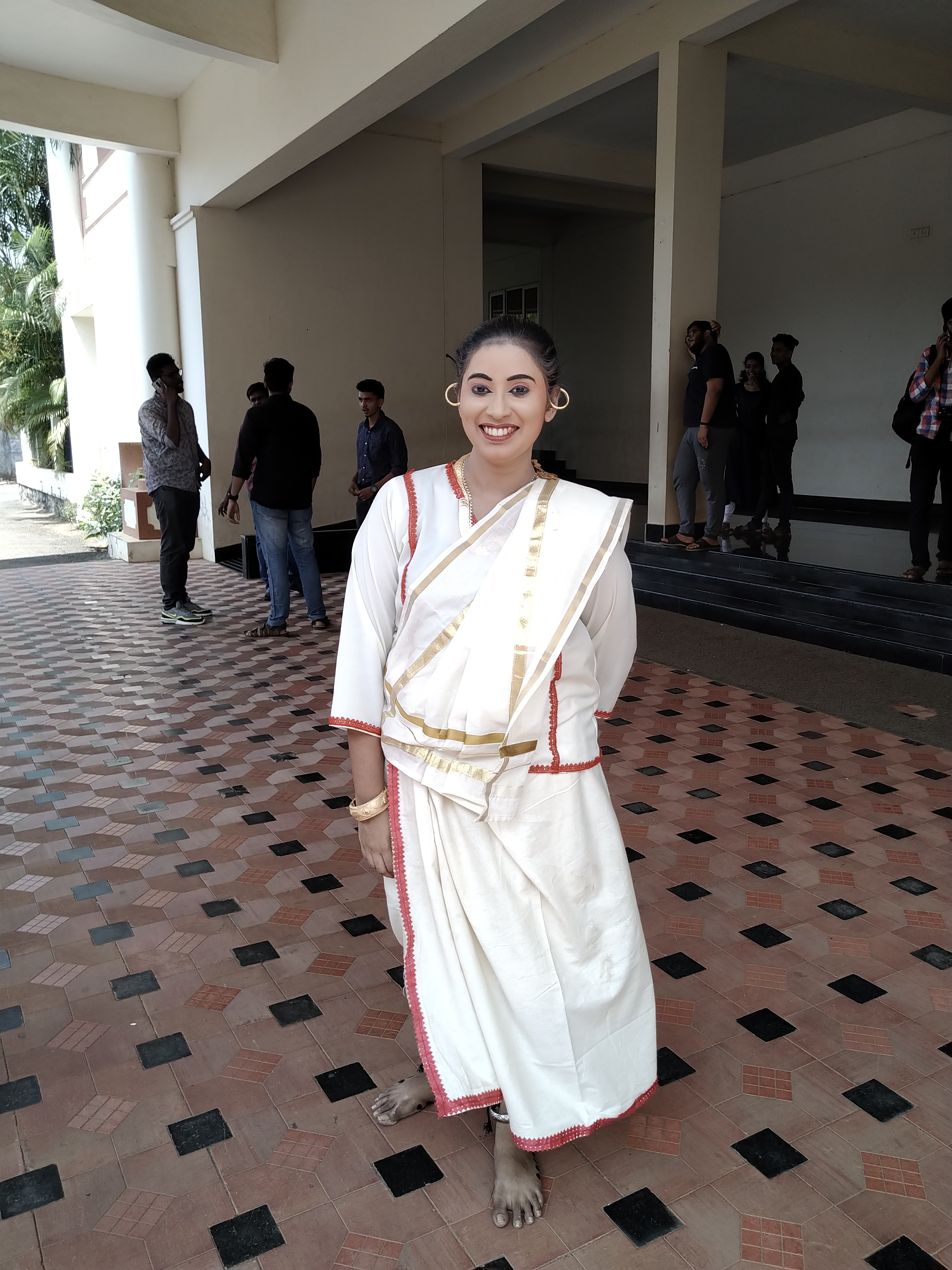
Women wearing Margamkali dress as part of a performance in a college arts festival

== Performance ==
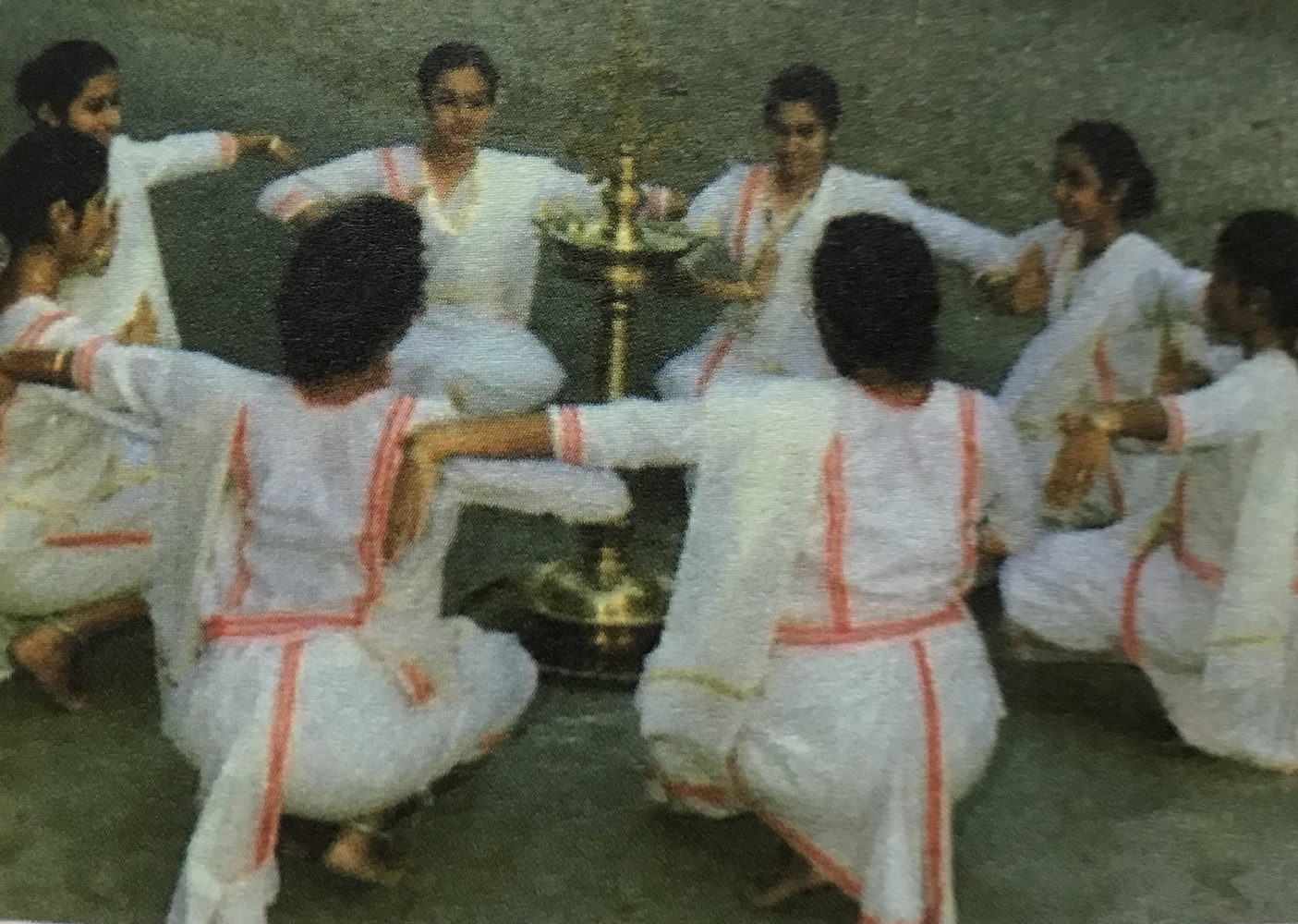
Knanaya Margam Kali

Typically, a dozen dancers sing and dance clapping around a Nilavilakku wearing the traditional "Chattayum Mundum". The lamp represents Christ and the performers his disciples. The performance is usually held in two parts ("padham") and begins with songs and dances narrating the life of Saint Thomas, the apostle. It then takes a striking turn with a martial play of artificial swords and shields. Margamkali does not use any instruments other than two small palm size cymbals played by the same person who sings the song. It was originally played by men and afterwards by boys, but nowadays women also perform the dance.

== Today ==
Currently both Margamkali and Parichamuttukali are included in the State Youth Festival of Kerala. This makes these art forms a competitive item in the Four-tier system (i.e. School, Sub District, Revenue and State level) Youth festival. Margam Kali is performed mainly by women in cultural shows and by school children in a variety of competitions.

== Bibliography ==
- Ipe, Ann (2015). "A Content Analysis of the Changes in Margamkali and Its Present Scenario". Xavierian Research Journal. 3. St. Xavier's College for Women.
- Karukaparambil, George (2005). Marganitha Kynanaitha: Knanaya Pearl. Deepika Book House. ASIN B076GCH274.
- Vellian, Jacob (1990). Crown, Veil, Cross: Marriage Rights. Syrian Church Series. Vol. 15. Anita Printers. OCLC 311292786.
- Vellian, Jacob (2001). Knanite Community: History and Culture. Vol. 17. Jyothi Book House. OCLC 50077436.

== See also ==
- Arts of Kerala
- Kerala Folklore Academy
