= Sarkaradevi Temple =

Bhadrakali Temple

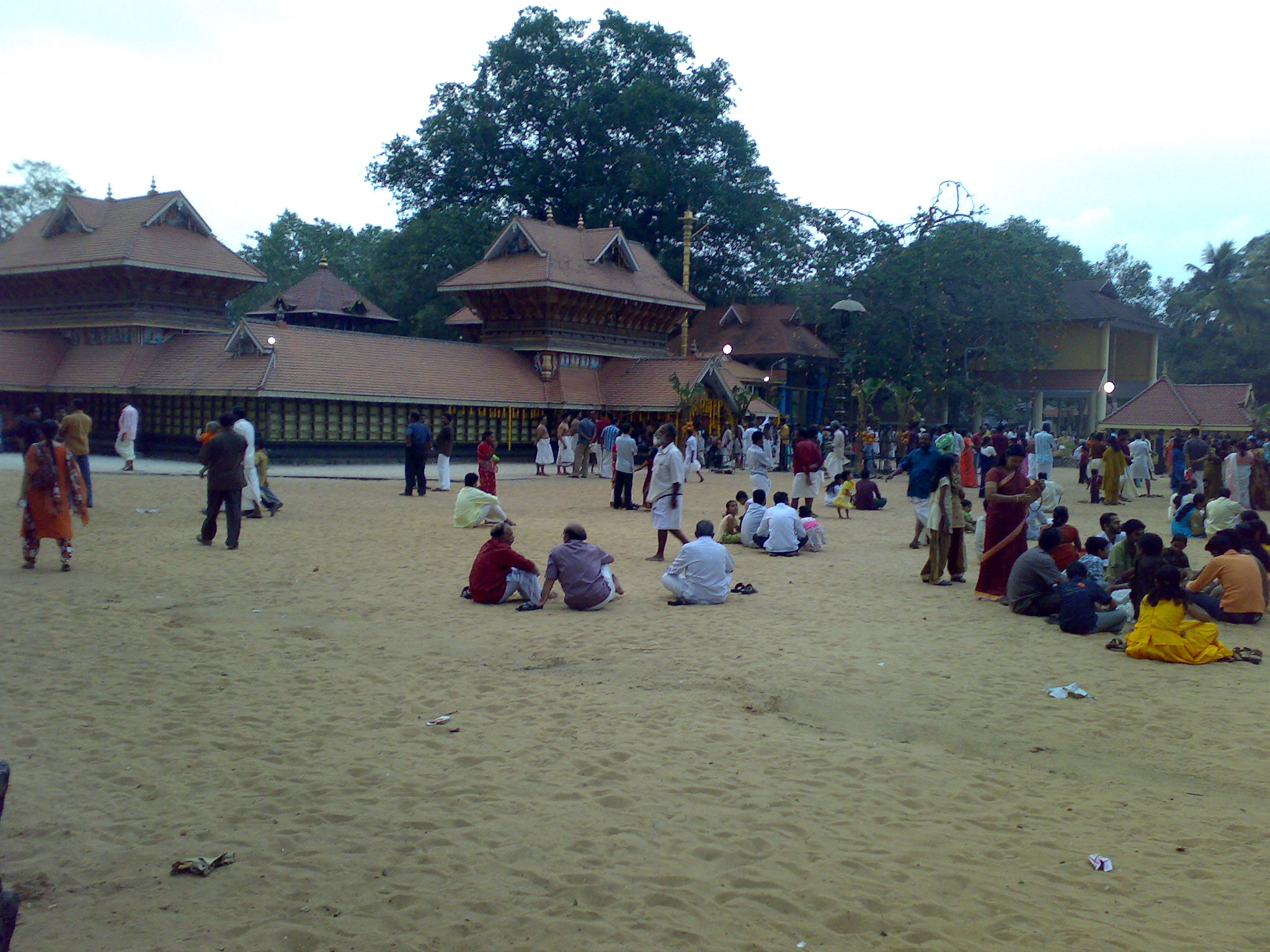

- Sarkaradevi Temple, Sarkara, Thiruvananthapuram, Kerala

Religion
- Affiliation: Hinduism
- District: Thiruvananthapuram
- Deity: Goddess Bhadrakali
- Festivals: Pongala; Kaliyoottu; Meena Bharani

Location
- Location: Sarkara, Chirayinkeezhu
- State: Kerala
- Country: India
- Interactive map of Sarkaradevi Temple
- Coordinates: 8°39′14.4″N 76°47′09.6″E

Specifications
- Temple: One
- Elevation: 31.62 m (104 ft)

Website
- https://www.sarkaradevitemple.com/

Sarkaradevi Temple is one of the most important temples in South India. It is situated Chirayinkeezhu town in Thiruvananthapuram district. Tradition accords a remote antiquity to this temple. Its main deity is Bhadrakali (Goddess Durga). The Sarkaradevi Temple assumed a significant status for many reasons and rose to historical importance mainly with the introduction of the famous Kaliyoot festival by Anizham Thirunal Marthanda Varma, the Travancore sovereign, in 1748. The Sarkaradevi Temple have some basic attachment with Nakramcode Devi Temple which located in Avanavanchery, Attingal.

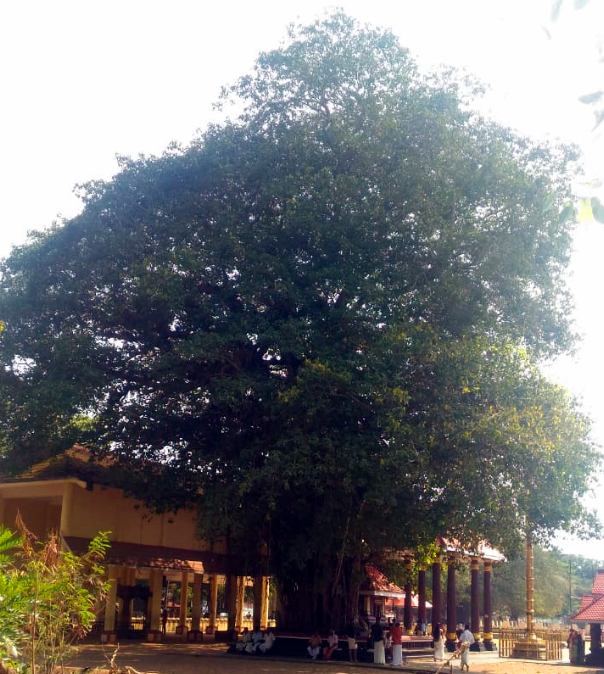
Ficus tree in front of Sarkaradevi Temple, Chirayinkeezhu, Thiruvananthapuram, Kerala

== History ==
Chirayinkeezhu Taluk being directly under the immediate administration of the Attingal, Kerala Swarupam, the Attingal Ranis where entrusted by the Travancore Raja with the conduct of the elaborate festival of Kaliyoot. The Attingal Rani being related to the Travancore royal family through adoption from the Kolathunadu royal family. From the time of Venad Kings, had enjoyed independent rights in several respects over the neighbouring regions and temples and at times even over the entire Venad. Even the King Marthanda Varma annexed Attingal to Travancore, soon after ascending the throne Marthanda Varma decided to assume direct control over Attingal 'estate'. The Ranis seem to have been allowed to continue in their independent status in many respects. Hence it was no wonder that when the former decided to introduce Kaliyoot festival in the Sarkaradevi Temple of Chirayinkeezhu Division, he entrusted the responsibility to the Attingal Ranis, even though the finances came directly from the Travancore royal treasury.

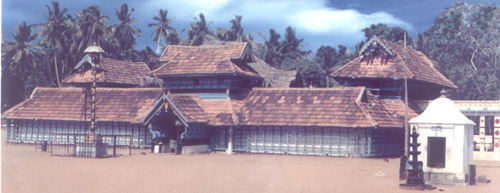
Old Sarkara Temple

The Attingal Ranis in turn bestowed the members of the military family of Niranam poets, as Kannassa, they were probably Nair Panikkers or members of the Kaniyar caste, which makes their claim to mastery of Sanskrit a significant feature as Kaniyar, being adept in Astrology and Ayurveda, they were accepted by the Kings. When two princesses were adopted from Kolathunad, some senior members of the Ponnara family are said to have accompanied them as bodyguards to Attingal, where the former were settled by the Venad Kings. The descendants of the family are still residing there, with the responsibility of supervising the grand festival. Even now the responsibility is continuing with the descendants of the Ponnara family. One of the most important peculiarities of this temple is that it is the only temple in South Kerala where such elaborate Kaliyoot festival is conducted. Another festival which makes the temple the center of attraction is the Meenabharani mahotswavam which is conducted for ten days in the month of March–April every year. Famous Malayalam Film Actor Prem Nazir donated an elephant to the Sarkara Devi Temple.

== Festivals ==
=== Kaliyoot ===
Kaliyoottu was originally a practice that existed in the north Malabar. The credit of bringing this ritual to southern parts of Kerala belongs to King Marthanda Varma of Odanad (1729–1758). Legend has it that King Marthanda Varma tried several times to annexe the Kingdom of Kayamkulam. Though he was defeated and disappointed all these times he was so determined that he decided to try again. With this obstinate vision he made another arrangement for war. On his way to Kayamkulam the king chose the big ground near the Sarkara temple to take rest.

Soon he was surrounded by local people and their leaders. It was from them the king happened to hear about the powers of the Sarkara Devi. He promised that he would offer her a Kaliyoot if she blesses him to win the war. He became victorious in that war and kept his promise.

The chief festival in the temple is the Kaliyoot festival, which falls in the Malayalam month of Kumbham (February/March). The object of the festival is to offer the first harvest to the Goddess. The rituals and ceremonies related to the festival extend up to nine days. It also involves a dramatic presentation of the story related to the genesis of Kali and the confrontation between Kali and the demon Darika, which represents good and evil respectively.

Kaliyoot is the dramatic presentation of the genesis of Bhadrakali and Darika the representatives of good and evil respectively, their confrontation and later the extermination of Darika in devotional terms and with rhythmic footsteps.

The colossal body of Bhadrakali was jet black. She had three burning eyes and her mouth was like a huge cave. Two long saber like teeth were projecting out from it. Her black hair rolled down like a tumultuous river. She had innumerable arms and each holding a separate weapon. It was impossible to look at her face.

She went into battle against Danavendra and Darika.

The demon army was no match to Goddess Bhadrakali. All of them were crushed and killed. Then Danavendra was killed. Finally, Bhadrakali chopped the head of demon Darika.

Kaliyoot is a synthesis of older agrarian art tradition is a further established by the fact that the time chosen for performing Kaliyoot after Makara Koithu (the Malayalam month of Makaram corresponds to the season of the second harvest season in Kerala. Koithu is a Malayalam term for harvest) and that Kali appears under the guise of a pulaya (the pulaya caste is the traditional agricultural labouring community in Kerala.) girl in the Kali drama.

The object of Kaliyoot festival is to offer the elementary harvest to the Amma (the divine Mother), the defender of the land. The ritual art of Kaliyoot was originally celebrated in North Malabar to propitiate Goddess Kali was brought to Travancore and Sarkara Temple by King Marthanda Varma (1729–1758). There is a historical legend connected with it. For expanding the domain of this kingdom, Marthanda Varma Maharaja tried to capture Kayamkulam province several times. All his efforts were in vain and he felt disappointed. But he did not give away his ambition. His one and only motive was the defeat Kayamkulam Raja. With the unyielding desire he was forced to make another arrangement for a war. On his way to Kayamkulam it is said that he chose the big ground near the Sarkara temple to take rest.

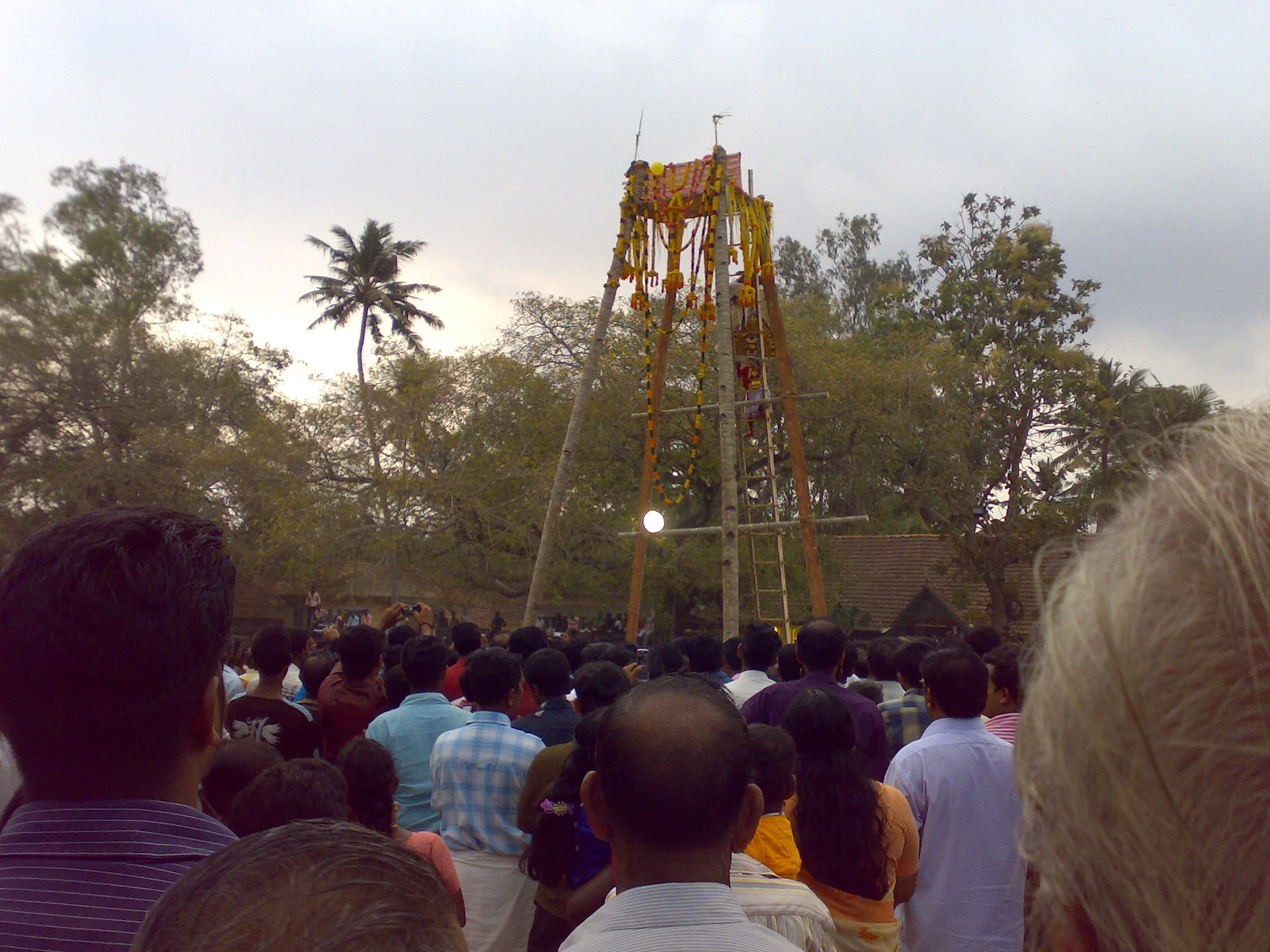
Kaliyoot Festival

Learning of the arrival of the Maharaja the Karakkar and Kalarigurukkars (The grand teachers of military techniques at the Kalari) assembled together to have a glimpse of the Maharaja. Hearing the Raja's stories of defeat at Kayamkulam, they suggested that the only way to his triumph was to offer a Kaliyoot to Sarkaradevi. In conformity with their suggestion the Maharaja decided to offer Kaliyoot to Sarkaradevi and finally became successful in the war.

Kaliyoot festival is a 9 day long festival with rituals and traditional ceremonies conducted in the temple premises. The first 7 days ceremonies are dramatic visualisations of stories leading to the war between Bhadrakali and Darika. The ceremonies takes its peak with the 8th and 9th day ceremonies,"Mudi uzhichil" and "Nilathil poru" respectively.

On the 8th day of ceremonies, Bhadrakali herself goes out in search of Darika, but returns at the end of the day without finding the demon king. This function is one of the most important ritual associated with the festival as on this day the deity offers blessings to the devotees directly.

The famous "Nilathil poru" (ground fight) takes place at the 9th and last day of ceremonies which visualises the killing of demon King Darika by Bhadrakali and thus spreading the prevalence of truth over the evil.

The 8th and 9th day functions in the Kali drama festival are a visual treat and the colorful ceremonies takes hours for completion. The men from the Ponnara family are assigned with the Kali, Durga, and Darika costumes.

The basic text titled Kaliyoot Mahotmyam authored by Niranam poets connect Kaliyoot as a devotional offering. After the construction of the stage for the chief performance the pernu and the invoking of the spirit of the Goddess into lamps, the chief rites of the first days begin and ends with compromising talk between Bhadrakali and Darika is known as "Mudithalam Thullal".

=== Meenabharani Festival ===
The Meenabharani festival is the second great annual festival in the temple of Sarkara Devi Temple. This festival often falls on the occasion of the annual special pooja of Attavishesham. During the period of king Dharma Raja and his success or Marthanda Varma orders were given for the elaborate conduct of the festival and the expenses like paddy, incurred for the same were recorded.(Mathilakam Records, churana 937, ola, 1639, 1750–51, Kerala State Archives, Thiruvananthapuram) The festival of Meenabharani is celebrated for ten days and it is believed that on the tenth day the benevolent Goddess appears and showers her blessings on the devotees. The Meenabharani festival generally starts with Kodiyettu (flag hoisting), nine days before the auspicious day of Bharani which is considered as the birth star of Sarkaradevi. It ends on the tenth day with Arat (holy immersion) of the deity in the temple tank. There are very interesting ceremonies connected with this festival. On all days recital of the exploits of the Goddess is staged by special teams of people. On the ninth day an important function is conducted in this temple known as Pallivetta. It is believed that during this function Sarkara devi disappears from the temple and she went for hunting. The Goddess is taken in procession as for hunting with the accompaniment of five caparisoned elephants and firetorches to the Bhagavathy palace. Through this hunting she tried to avoid powers of malice and maintain peace and security in this vicinity. During the earlier period animal sacrifices were conducted along with this performance. However, animal sacrifices were avoided during the later periods. Now this function ends with the return procession of the deity and the cutting of a coconut with a bow and arrow. After that the ceremonial Arat of the deity is conducted.

There are various stories passed on through generations about Sarkara temple. Most of the locals come together for the festival season. Chirayinkeezhu has a large number of expatriate workers. They all come together for Meenabharani irrespective of faith. Sarkara devi is commonly referred in Malayalam as "Sarakara Ponnammachi".

== See also ==
- List of Hindu temples in Kerala
- Temples of Kerala
- Vellayani Devi Temple
