= Kaliyoottu =

Indian folk play

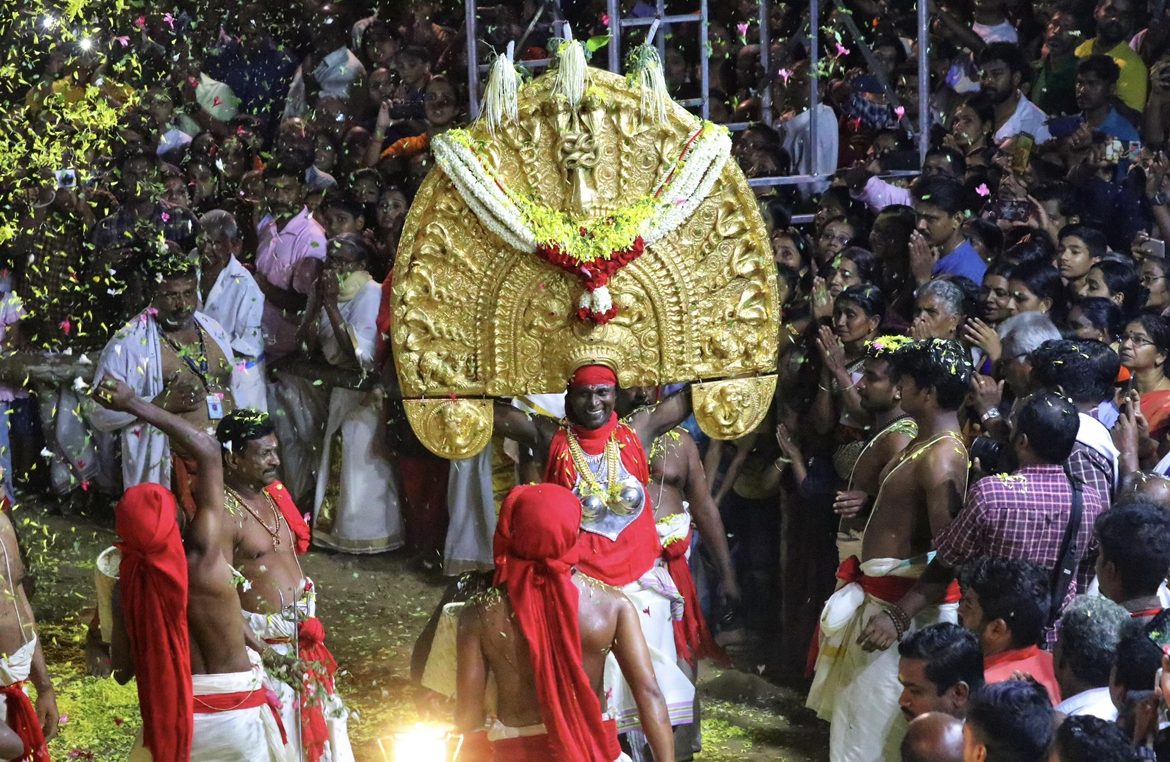
- Kalamkaval, a part of Kaliyoottu ceremony in Vellayani Devi Temple
- Native name: കാളിയൂട്ട് (Malayalam)
- Genre: Ritual
- Origin: Kerala, India

Kaliyoottu also known as Kali natakam (literally means Kali play) is a ritualistic performing art popular in Thiruvananthapuram and Kanniyakumari districts of southern Kerala, India. It is a folk art related to the battle between Bhadrakali and the asura Darika.

It is said that Marthandavarma, the Maharaja of Travancore who won the battle against Kayamkulam started Kaliyoottu at Sarkaradevi Temple in Thiruvananthapuram district.

== Overview ==
Kaliyoottu is also known as Paranate is a folk art form is mainly popular in Thiruvananthapuram and Kanniyakumari districts. Here Kali temples are known as Mudipuras. The name Mudipura means the place where Bhadrakali's hair (Mudi is the Malayalam word for hair and Pura means house) is kept. The main temples where Kaliyoottu takes place are Vellayani Devi Temple near Thiruvananthapuram and Sarkara Devi Temple near Chirayinkeezhu there is Kaliyoottu with local variation. The Kaliyoottu festival at Vellayani Temple is the longest running festival in South India . This festival lasts for 70 days and is held once in three years.

Pujaris in Mudipuras called 'Vathis', play an important role in Kaliyottu. Vathi dressed as Bhadrakali will perform the Kalamkaval ceremony, which is performed before main Kaliyoottu ritual. After the kalamkaval and aniyara kettal (dressing up), the ritual drama is staged.

Bhadrakalithottam, the ritual song of Kaliyoottu is to be sung in 48 days, but it fluctuates depending on the festival days. Inside the temple, the song is sung sitting on the pandal placed opposite the main deity. Kuzhithalam also known as Chinki is the main instrument used.

Dramatic and ritualistic elements come together harmoniously in this ritualistic art form that transforms an entire village into the performance.

== History ==
It is said that the Maharaja of Travancore Marthandavarma and his helper Ramayyan, defeated in the war with the Kayamkulam kingdom, rested on the altar in front of the Sharkaradevi temple on their way back. He prayed to the goddess for victory in the war and vowed to perform Kaliyoottu in front of the temple if he was victorious. It is said that Marthandavarma Maharaja was victorious in the ensuing battle and started Kaliyoottu at Sarkara temple. It is also said that the mother of Marthandavarma, Umayamma Rani gave the authority to perform this ritual to the Ponnara family. The first Kaliyoottu took place in 1749 AD.

There is another argument that Kaliyoottu was an ancient practice and that King Marthandavarma re-started this ancient ritual which was extinct.

== Ritual ==
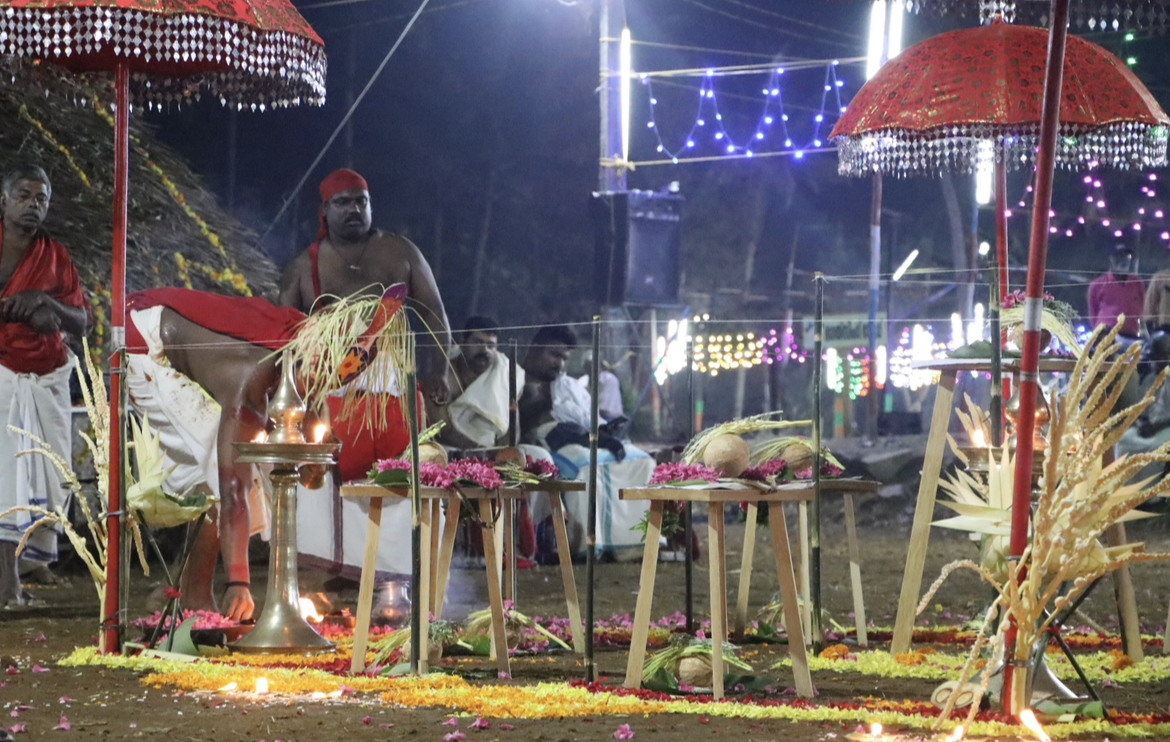
Uchabali ritual, a part of Kaliyoottu in Vellayani Devi Temple

During the royal reign, the Thevara people, who performed the puja rituals in the palace, used to come to Sarkaradevi Temple on the third or last Friday of Malayalam month Kumbha (February/March) and give the note to the senior member of the Ponnara family. Now the note is given under the leadership of Melshanti (main priest).

After writing the note for Kaliyottu, the drama will be staged for nine days as various stories making fun of social customs. Adding time each day, the ceremonies last until the dawn of the ninth day, the last day. A ceremony known as Uchabali is first done by the Vathis. During the Uchabali ceremony, the soldier sent by Darika disturbs the sacrificial ground, and then impales the soldier with the spear of Kali. The dead soldier is carried away wrapped in a mat. With this, the Uchabali will conclude. It is a ceremony performed during the time 12.30 am to 3.30 am known as Bhadrakaliyama.

On the south side of the temple, near an area known Tullalpura, a pandal called Kavalmadam is constructed. In some temples this pandal is known as Pallikamadam. On the first day, after the regular pujas in the temple, the goddess is invoked from the shrine in a lamp to the Kavalmadam. The goddess idol is placed on either side by a representative of the king and a representative of the Ettuveetil Pillamar. After the King and Pillaimar are seated, the first part of the ritual known as Vellattam begins. Legend has it that Vellatam is a dance performed by Lord Shiva's demons to wish the goddess victory.

On the third day, the character Narada enters the arena. It can be understood from his conversation that Narada came for local news and spot observation as per Shiva's instructions. It has a question and answer method as in folk dramas.

On the fourth day, as part of the ritual, Kavalut Nair, the protector of the area, enters the arena. Legend has it that Lord Shiva sent Nandikesan to Kaliyottu area for supervision. Kavalut Nair, a patriot, makes some social criticism. He severely criticizes polygamy in the Nair community at that time. On the fifth day, the characters of Olamballi and Ugramballi, who are full of brahminism, arrive.

On the sixth day, Kaniyar and Kurupp characters known as Nanair and Kantar come. They are believed to be divine sages who have come as per the instructions of Shiva and their duty is to find solutions to the problems of the localities. The ritual Pulayar Purappad is a 7th day ritual. There are eight characters in this, including the seven Pulayars and the Lord. Panicker caste people play the role in this. The legend behind the Pulayar Purappad is to commemorate how Bhadrakali disguised herself as Pulaya woman and entertained with the Pulayars while fleeing from the forest in fear of Vilwamangalam Swamiyar. This is a ceremony to commemorate Vilvamangalam Swamiyar who enshrined Sharkaradevi. The character of Kontipanikarachan, the guru of Kaliyoottu, also takes place on this day. On the eighth day, Bhadrakali and Durga travel in search of Darika. Bhadrakali travels to the north and Durga to the south. Bhadrakali and Durga, dressed in special costumes, enter every house and are welcomed by the family with cheers and lighting of candles. The Devis return unable to find Darikan.

The main part of Kaliyottu, the killing of Darikan, begins on the ninth day at 5 pm. This ceremony is known as Paranate. The name may have come from the aerial battle or flying (Parakkal is the Malayalam word for flying) battle with Darikan. After the battle in the sky, Nilathil poru (meaning battle on the ground) starts. This is a scene that creates a sense of fierce war. At the end of the seven wars, Kali kills Darika and symbolically cuts Darika's head. Darika Nigraha, the killing of Darika is symbolically performed by cutting bunched banana.

After the Aaraattu (holy bath), the ceremony concludes with the Devi returning to main shrine.
