= Sarkara-Chirayinkeezhu =

- village
- Location in Kerala, India Sarkara-Chirayinkeezhu (India)
- Coordinates: 8.656081°N 76.787006°E
- Country: India
- State: Kerala
- District: Thiruvananthapuram
- Talukas: Chirayinkeezhu

Government
  - Body: Gram panchayat

Population (2011)
  - Total: 29,907

Languages
  - Official: Malayalam, English
- Time zone: UTC+5:30 (IST)
- PIN: 6XXXXX
- Vehicle registration: KL-

Sarkara-Chirayinkeezhu is a village in Thiruvananthapuram district in the state of Kerala, India.

== Demographics ==
As of 2011 India census, Sarkara-Chirayinkeezhu had a population of 29907 with 13721 males and 16186 females.
