= Kottukal =

- village
- Location in Kerala, India Kottukal (India)
- Coordinates: 8.3812°N 77.0152°E
- Country: India
- State: Kerala
- District: Thiruvananthapuram

Government
  - Body: Gram panchayat

Population (2011)
  - Total: 46,915

Languages
  - Official: Malayalam, English
- Time zone: UTC+5:30 (IST)
- PIN: 695501
- Vehicle registration: KL-

Kottukal is a village in the taluk of Neyyattinkara, Thiruvananthapuram district, in the state of Kerala, India.

== Demographics ==
As of 2011 India census, Kottukal had a population of 46915 with 23202 males and 23713 females.
