= Utsava =

Hindu festivity

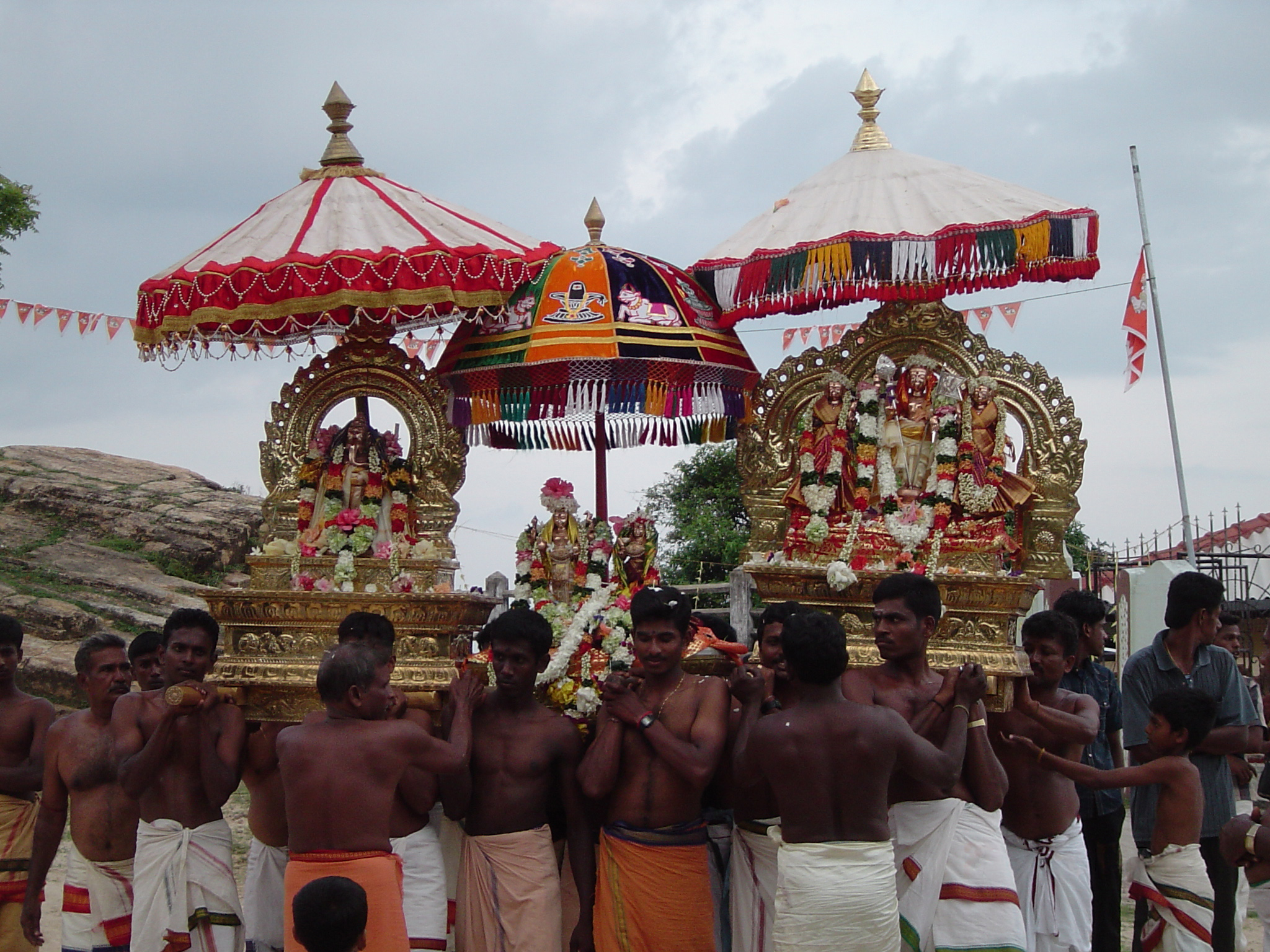
Hindu procession during an utsava

Utsava (Sanskrit: उत्सव, lit. 'special occasion'), also referred to as Utsavam, generally means a festival or celebration or any joyous occasion, mostly associated with Hinduism. It also carries the meaning of delight, merriment and pleasure. The Sanskrit word utsava comes from the word "ut" meaning "removal" and "sava" which means "worldly sorrows" or "grief". According to Hindu tradition, utsava are specific to festivals associated with temples.

According to the Agamas, the daily rituals are called Nityotsava, weekly festivals as Varotsava, monthly as Masotsava, alignment with stars as rkotsava and annual festivals as Mahotsava or Brahmotsava. Most of the temple towns in South India have prakarams and streets that accommodate an elaborate festival calendar in which dramatic processions circumambulate the shrines at varying distances from the centre. The temple chariots used in processions are progressively larger in size based on the size of the concentric streets.

== Utsava ==
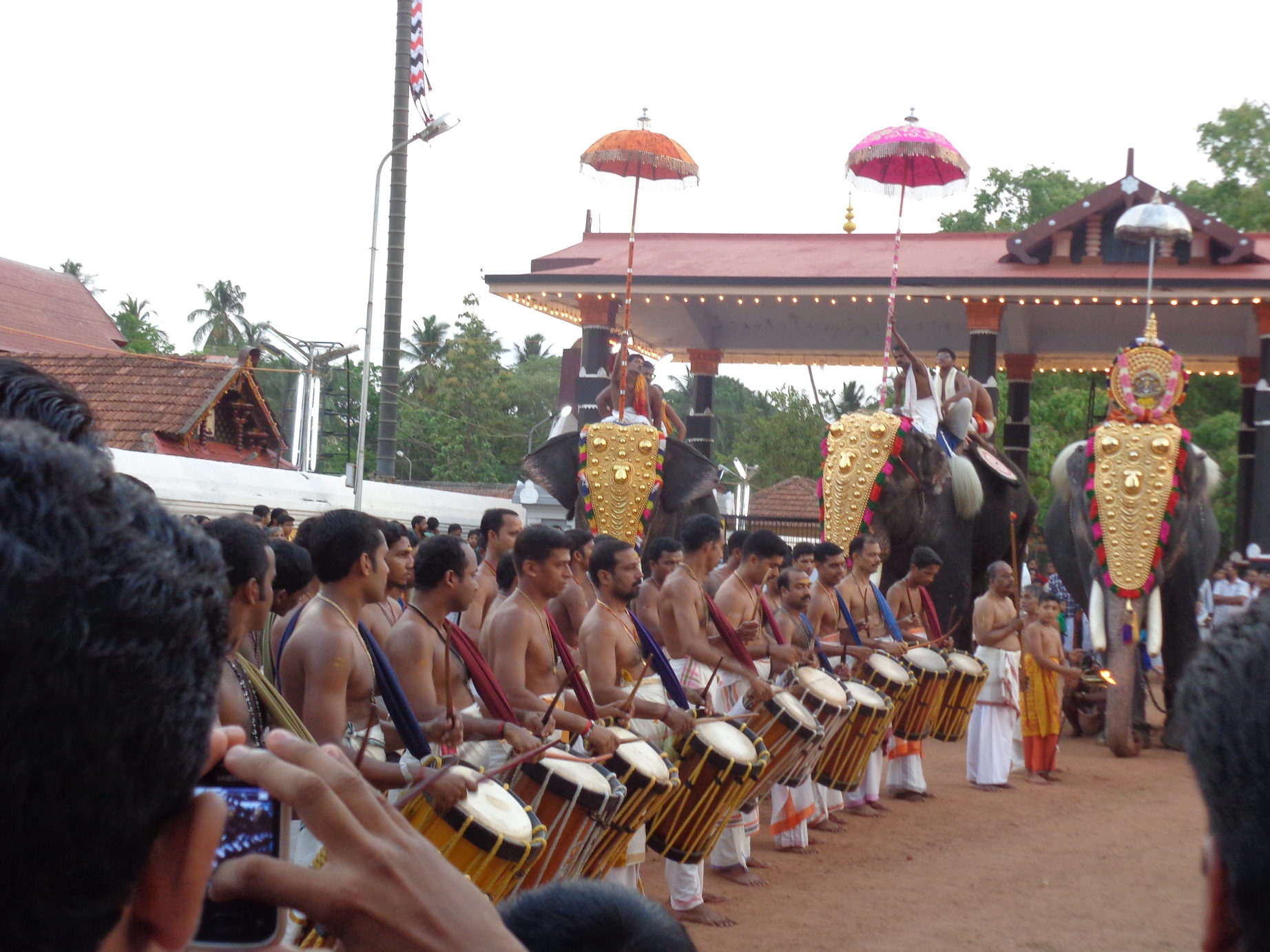
Thiruvangad Utsavam

Utsava is a Sanskrit term referring to festival and the festivities associated. Agamas, the diction for temples, refer to utsava as specific festivals associated with the temples. More than the religious aspects, the utsavas are meant to celebrate along with the society and thanking the elements of nature. People belonging to various castes and tribes come together to celebrate the event, which is always associated with a feast for all. The utsavas are usually associated with a season like Vasanthotsava celebrated during spring season. The events usually have parades and the festive deities are taken around various streets to indicate that god is accessible to all. According to Agamas, the daily rituals are called Nityotsava, weekly festivals as Varotsava, monthly as Masotsava, alignment with stars as rkotsava and annual festivals as Mahotsava or Brahmotsava.

== Types of utsavas ==
Most South Indian temples have daily, weekly, monthly and annual rituals, and festivals. There are weekly rituals like somavaram and sukravaram, fortnightly rituals like pradosham and monthly festivals like amavasai (new moon day), kiruthigai, pournami (full moon day) and sathurthi when ablution and special poojas are performed. Brahmotsavam is the chief festival celebrated in most of the temples for ten or more days. The word is a combination of two Sanskrit words—Brahma and utsavam (festival)—and Brahma reportedly conducted the first festival. Brahma also means "grand" or "large". Vasanthotsavam, the spring festival, is celebrated in temples to worship lord of nature and their elements and natural forces as well as lord and deity of directions and environment. There are special festivals like Theerthavari, Garuda Sevai and Sapthastanam when the festival deities of many temples are taken in chariots or vehicles to the main temple in the region. Devotees perform various rituals on the festive deities.

== City-scape and festivals ==
Most of the historic South Indian cities like Madurai, Srirangam, Sirkali, Tiruvarur, and Chidambaram were built around large temples in the center of the city. The streets of the city act as extension of the prakarams of the temple. These squares retain their traditional names of Aadi, Chittirai, Avani-moola and Masi streets, corresponding to the Tamil month names and also to the festivals associated. The temple prakarams and streets accommodate an elaborate festival calendar in which dramatic processions circumambulate the shrines at varying distances from the centre. The temple chariots used in processions are progressively larger in size based on the size of the concentric streets. The festive images are carried out in various palanquins or mounts with figures of peacock, elephant, Garuda or large chariots. Ancient Tamil classics record the temple as the centre of the city and the surrounding streets. The city's axes were aligned with the four-quarters of the compass, and the four gateways of the temple provided access to it. The wealthy and higher echelons of the society were placed in streets close to the temple, while the poorest were placed in the fringe streets.
