= Vellayani Devi Temple =

Bhadrakali Devi Temple

Major Vellayani Devi Temple
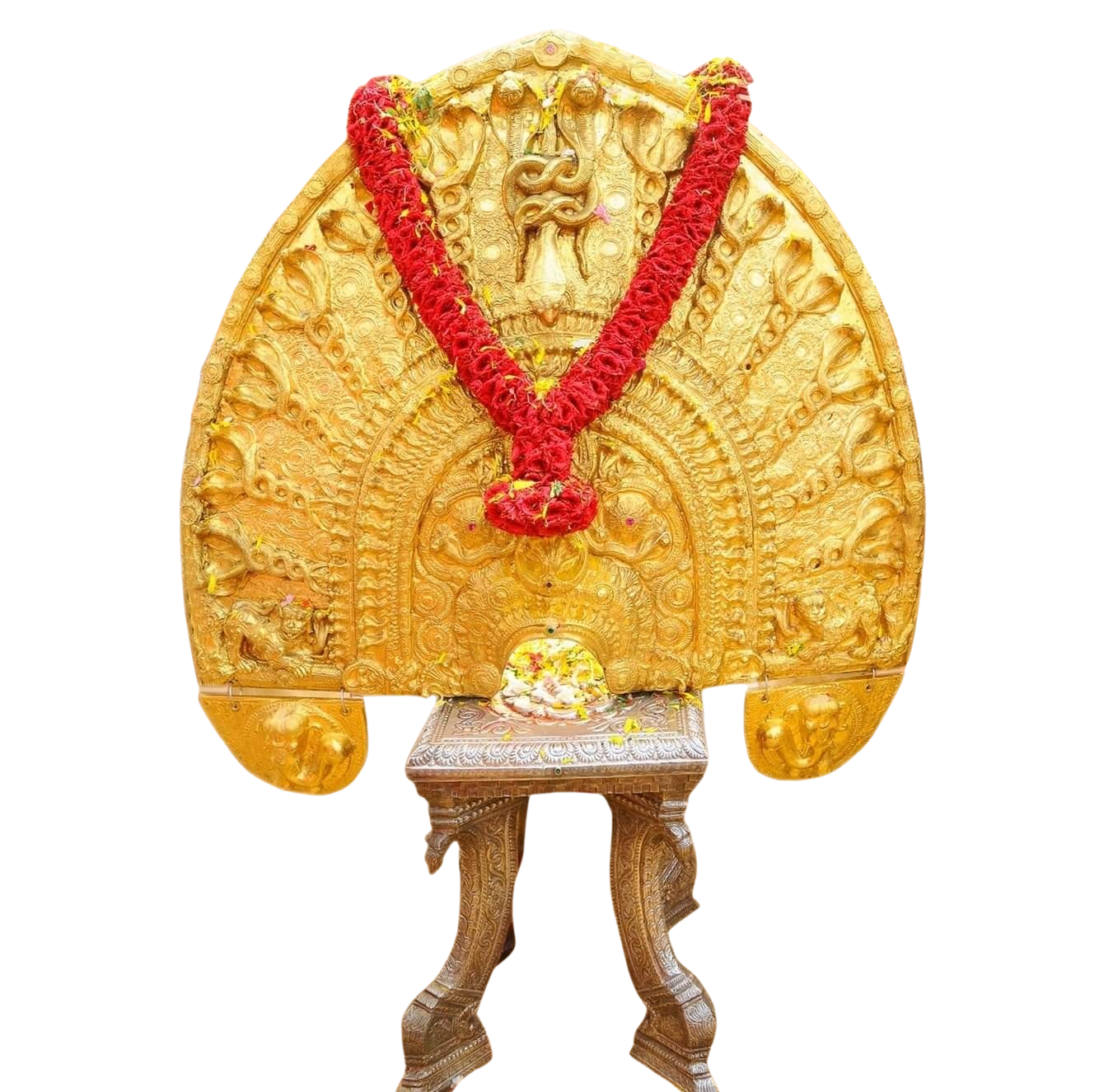
- Golden Idol of Vellayani Devi

- Location in Kerala Vellayani Devi Temple (India) Vellayani Devi Temple (Asia)

Religion
- Affiliation: Hinduism
- District: Thiruvananthapuram
- Deity: Goddess Bhadrakali
- Festivals: Kaliyoottu, Aswathy Pongala
- Governing body: Travancore Devaswom Board

Location
- Location: Nemom, Vellayani
- State: Kerala
- Country: India
- Coordinates: 8°26′44″N 76°59′29″E

Architecture
- Type: Dravidian architecture (Kovil)

Website
- https://www.onlinetdb.com/

Vellayani Temple Dikkubali Mahotsavam

The Major Vellayani Devi Temple is a highly revered shrine in Kerala, India, dedicated to goddess Bhadrakali. The shrine is situated in Vellayani 1.5 km west of Vellayani junction, 12 km southeast of Thiruvananthapuram on the eastern bank of Vellayani Lake. The temple is under the management of Travancore Devaswom Board. The temple structure has a bronze roof with traditional art work and carries Dravidian architecture. The temple has eastern and northern towers called Gopurams with statues of different Gods sculptured in them. The Gopurams function as gateways through the walls that surround the temple complex.

Vellayani Devi Temple is renowned for celebrating South India's longest continuous temple festival and the duration of the festival is around 65 to 70 days. This festival is held every three years.

== Deities ==
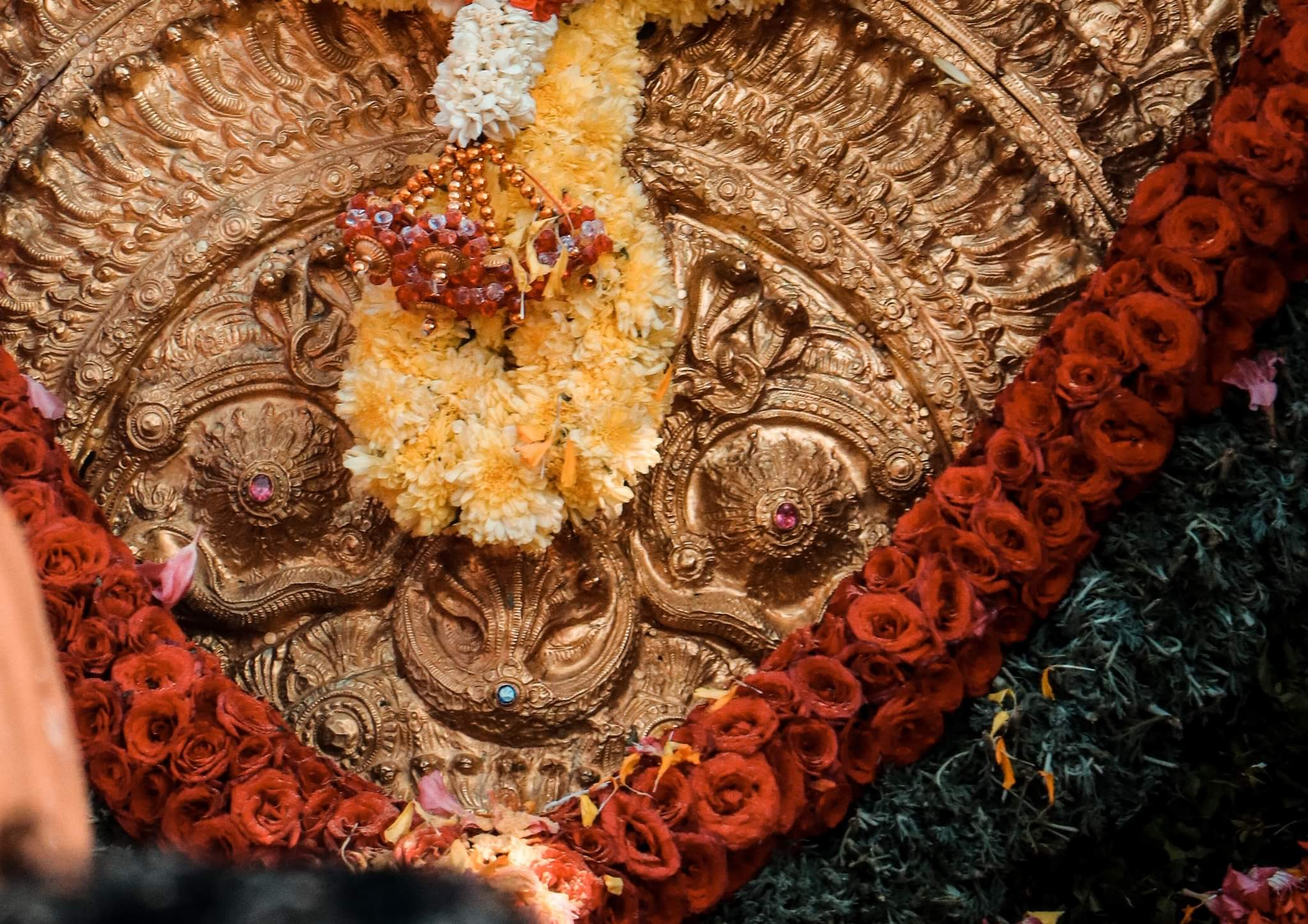
Artistic detailing of the golden idol

The temple enshrines Goddess Bhadrakali as the presiding deity. The deity, as per the scriptures is a form of Shiva's wrath. Goddess Kali is situated toward the north (vadakke nada). The idol is known in the local Malayalam language as Thirumudi. The idol of the Goddess in the Vellayani temple is one of the largest among the idols of Kerala Kali temples. The idol is four and a half feet in height as well as width. Pure gold and precious stones decorate the frontal view of the idol.

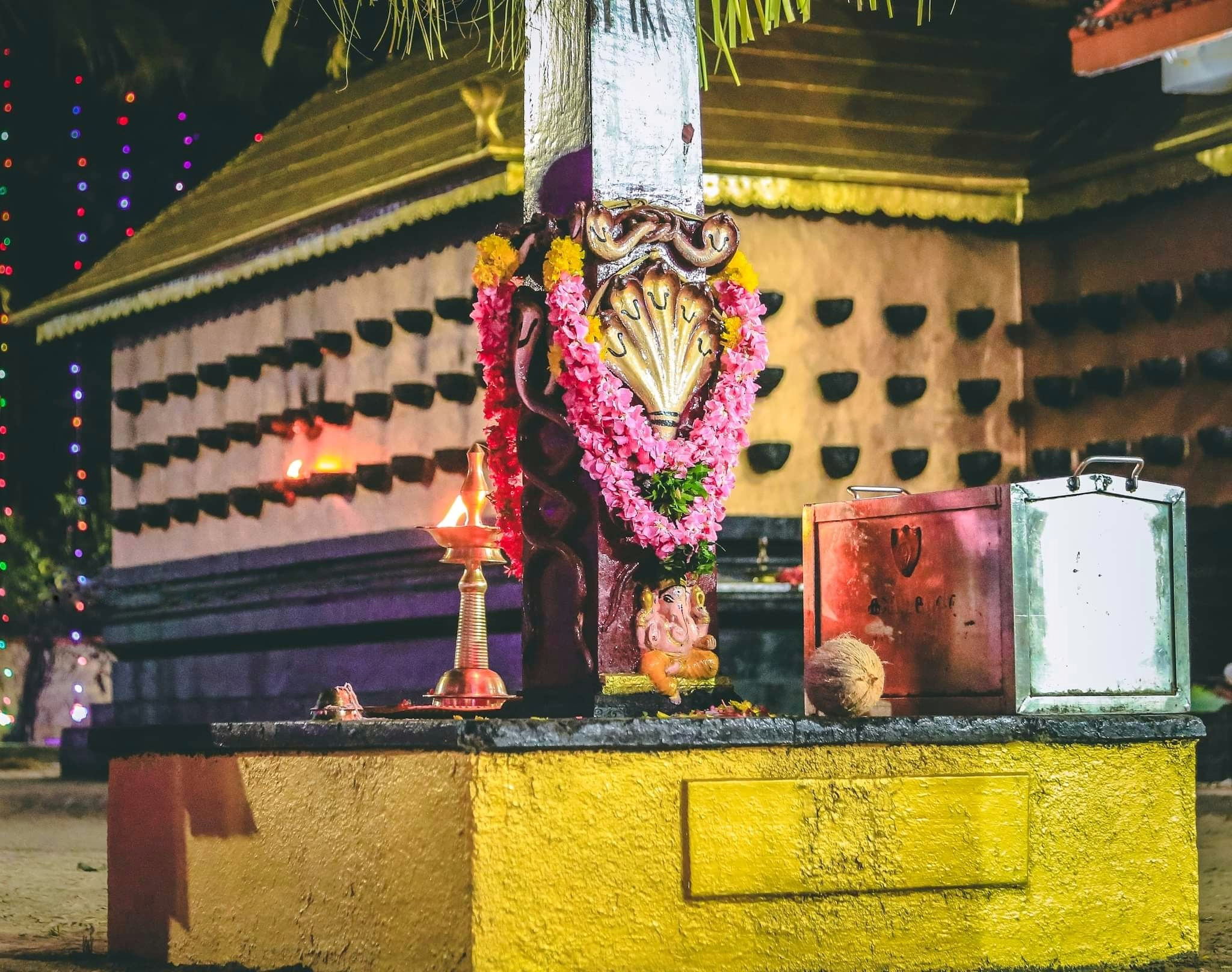
Upadevatha's in Vellayani Devi Temple

Other deities worshipped at the Vellayani Devi temple called Upadevatha's temples include Lord Shiva, Lord Ganesh and Nagaraja. The temple also has a small sub-temple where another deity Madan Thampuran is enshrined.

In the temple Antler is also worshipped. The circulating notion about this is that the antler serves as a medium to invoke the spirit of the divinity at a new-built temple. One of the antlers kept in the Sanctum sanctorum oriented towards the east is from the Thekkathu.

== History ==
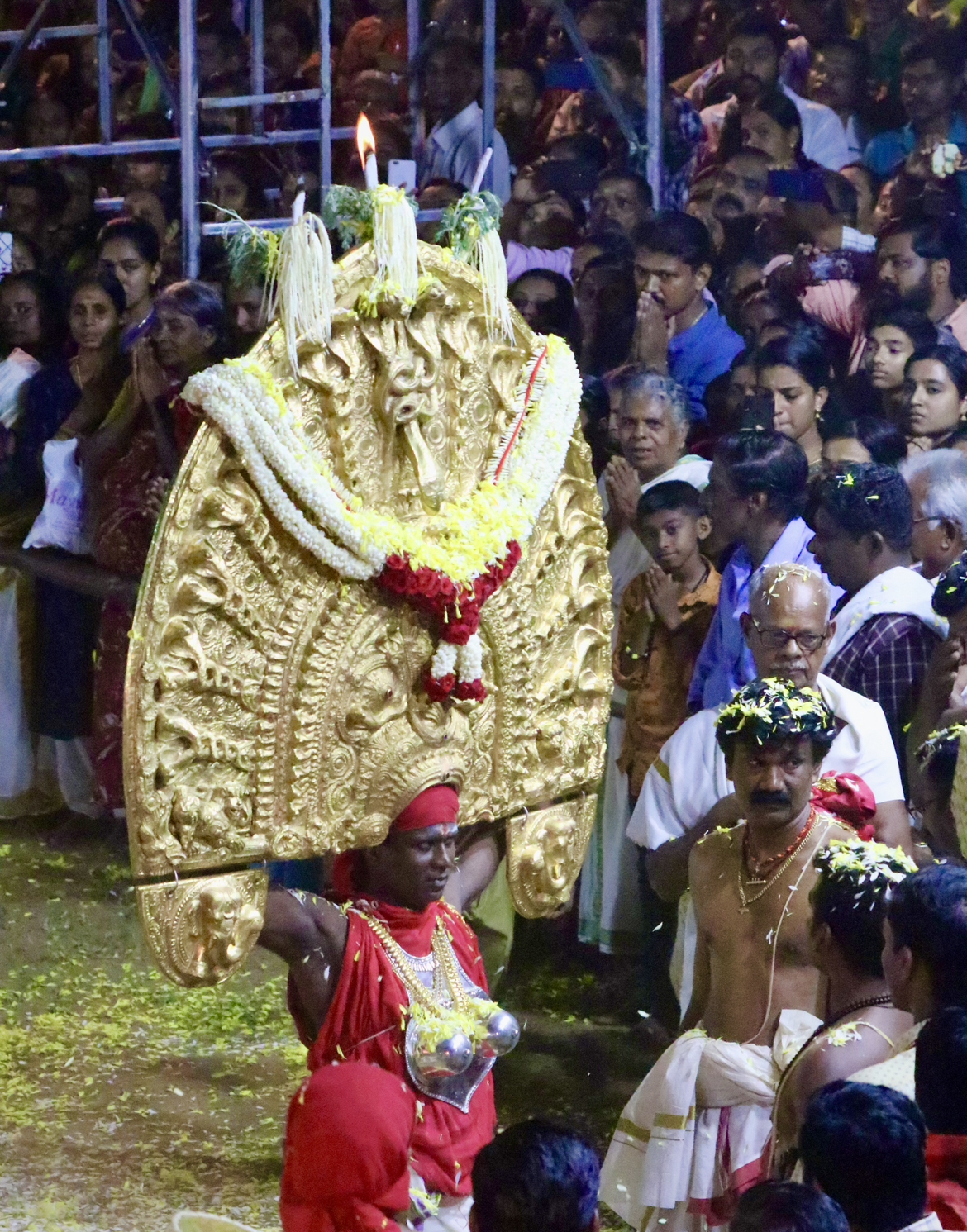
Vellayani Devi

Legend says that a Kollan (blacksmith) named Kelan Kulasekhara saw a frog with divine spirit of Goddess near Vellayani Lake. He caught the divine frog with the help of his assistant who belonged to a low caste. They brought the matter to the Nair chieftains of the locality and with their help Kulasekhara consecrated the Thiru Mudi (idol) in which divine spirit is evoked. The right to perform Uchabali (a ritual connected with festival of the temple) is still held by the Nair families. Priest of the temple is not belonging to Brahmin community but a selected person belonging to the Kollan (blacksmith) community.

== Kali - Darika Legend ==
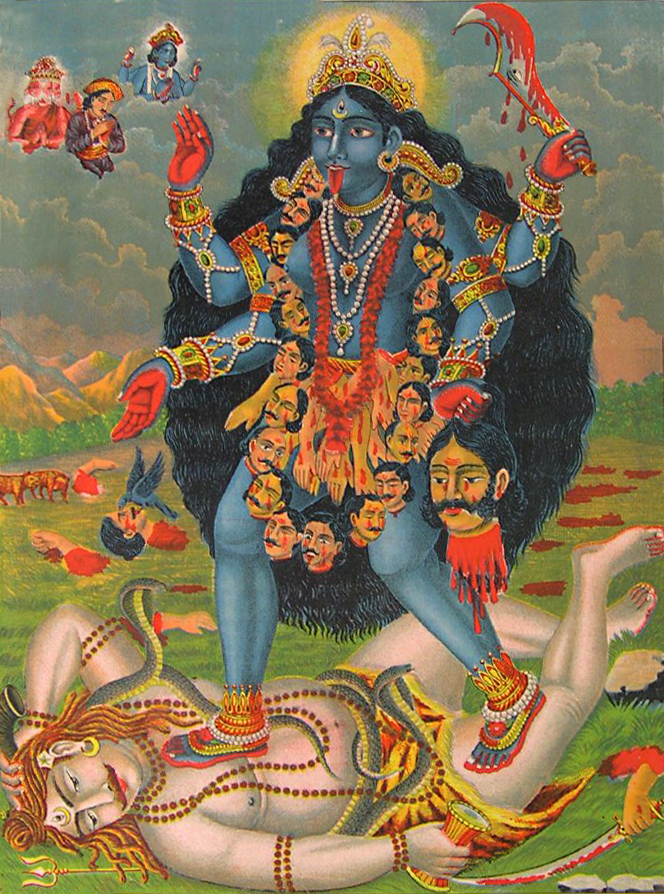
Bhadrakali

Darika was a demon who received a boon from Brahma which granted that he would never be defeated by any man living in the fourteen worlds mentioned in Hindu mythology. This made Darika immensely powerful and arrogant. with this boon, Darika went on to conquer the world, defeating even Indra, the king of the Devas. As his atrocities became intolerable, the sage Narada requested Shiva to control Darika Shiva opened his third eye and create Kali, whose purpose was to destroy Darika.The Goddess was a woman who was not born of humans. Even after beheading Darika, Goddess unable to control her rage, began destroy everything. The Gods could not defeat her, and she was finally calmed when Shiva lay on the ground in front of her, submitting.

== Kaliyoottu Mahotsavam ==
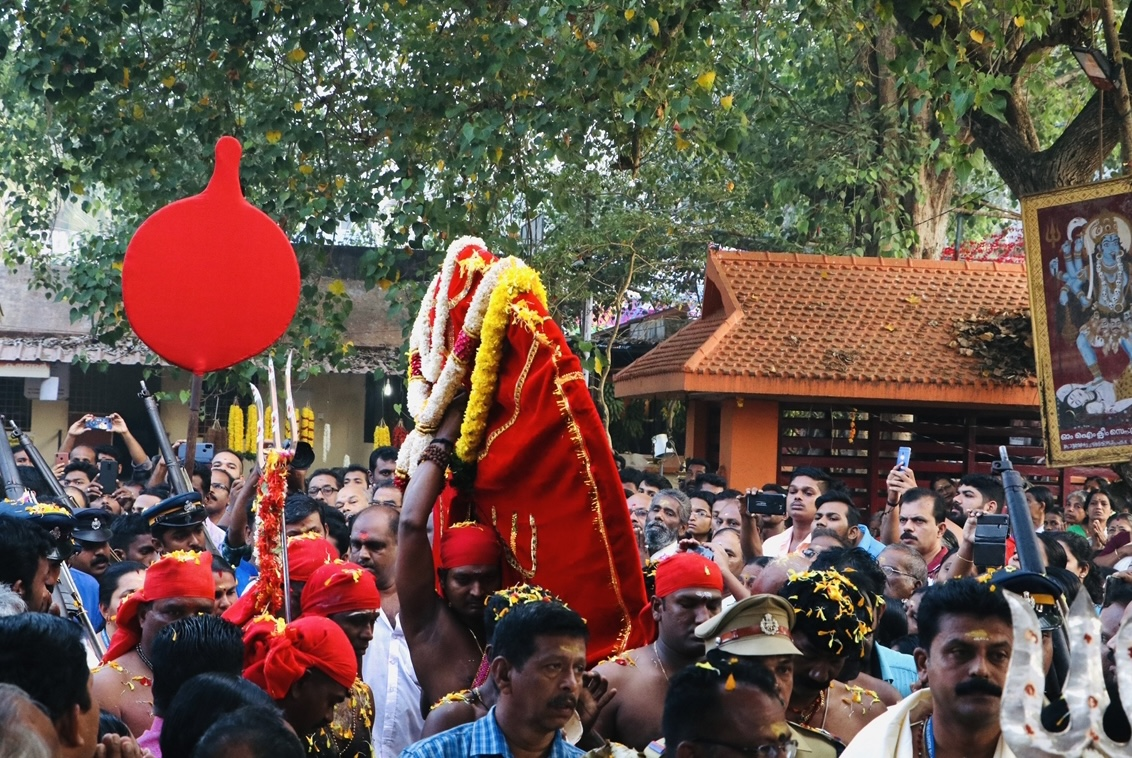
Purathezhunallathu At Vellayani Devi Temple

Vellayani Devi Temple is renowned for celebrating the longest continuous festival of South India and the duration of the festival is around 65 to 70 days. This festival is held every three years, usually between February and April. The festival is known as the Kaliyoottu Mahotsavam, which literally means "the festival to sumptuously feed Devi". Kaliyoottu is the dramatic presentation of the genesis of Bhadrakali and Darika the representatives of good and evil respectively, their confrontation and later the extermination of Darika in devotional terms and with rhythmic footsteps.

Kaliyoottu is a ritualistic performing art. The most important rituals associated with the Kaliyoottu festival are Kalamkaval, Uchabali, Dikkubali, Paranettu and Nilathil Poru.

Here in Vellayani encompassing beautiful Vellayani Lake, is the heaven of the resplendent "Vellayani Devi" (Goddess Bhadrakali), is the deity of this village. The deity is in the form of a golden crown ("Thanka Thirumudi"), inside Mudippura (mudi means hair of goddess and pura means house). Pujaris in Mudipuras called 'Vathis', play an important role in Kaliyoottu. During Kaliyoottu Vathi dressed as Bhadrakali will perform the Kalamkaval ceremony wearing the "Thanka Thirumudi".

Once in three years here celebrating Kaliyoottu, ie. " Thanka Thirumudi " The main deity who comes out from the Mudippura and visits all the four directions (Dikkubali) insearch of "Darika" (The Evil). Finally, the goddess finds Darika near the temple on her journey on air (Paranettu) and calls him for an open war (Nilathil poru).

On the nilathil poru day Devi kills Darika and ensures peace and prosperity to her devotees. This ritual is a symbolic victory over Evil by Goodness.

The Vellayani Kaliyoottu is the longest running festival celebrated in Kerala, continuously for 70 days. The date of the Kaliyoottu festival was announcing on the ceremony called "Thiruvay Prasnam" (on the basis of astrology)

The darshan of the "Thanka Thirumudi" (Goddess Golden Thirumudi crown, the main deity) is an enlightening experience for the devotees. The Kaliyoottu gives pleasure, peace and prosperity to the Devotees.

=== Karadikottu ===
Karadikottu is the maiden custom related with the festival performed with a special drum. The performer is locally known as Panan.

=== Kalamkaval ===
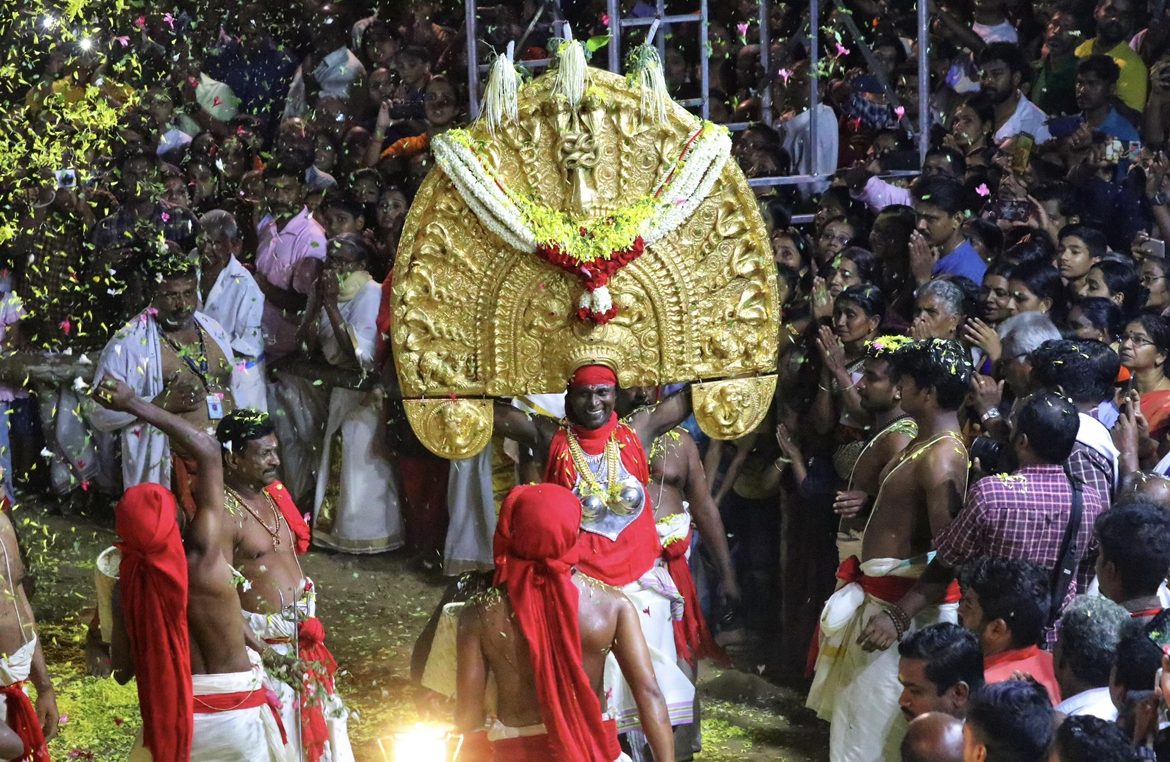
Kalamkaval in Vellayani Devi Temple

Kalamkaval is a famous customs practiced at the temple premises and nearby places during festival. It is believed that the Goddess Bhadrakali searches her enemy demon, Daaruka in all directions before putting him to death. Devotees commemorate this legend by seeing this unique Kalamkaval. Kalamkaval is the ritual in which chief priest, carries the idol on his head and performs some trance like dances until he is unconscious. During kalamkaval, chief priest wears anklet and thiruvabharam (traditional gold ornaments of goddess that includes kappu, vanki, odyanam, paalakka mala, pichi mottu mala, muthu mala etc.). All people believe that the priest gets strength to carry on the trance with the idol on his head, due to the blessings of the Devi enshrined in the temple.

=== Nagaroottu ===
Nagaroottu is the custom performed (before "Uchabali") for the satisfaction of Naga.

=== Uchabali ===
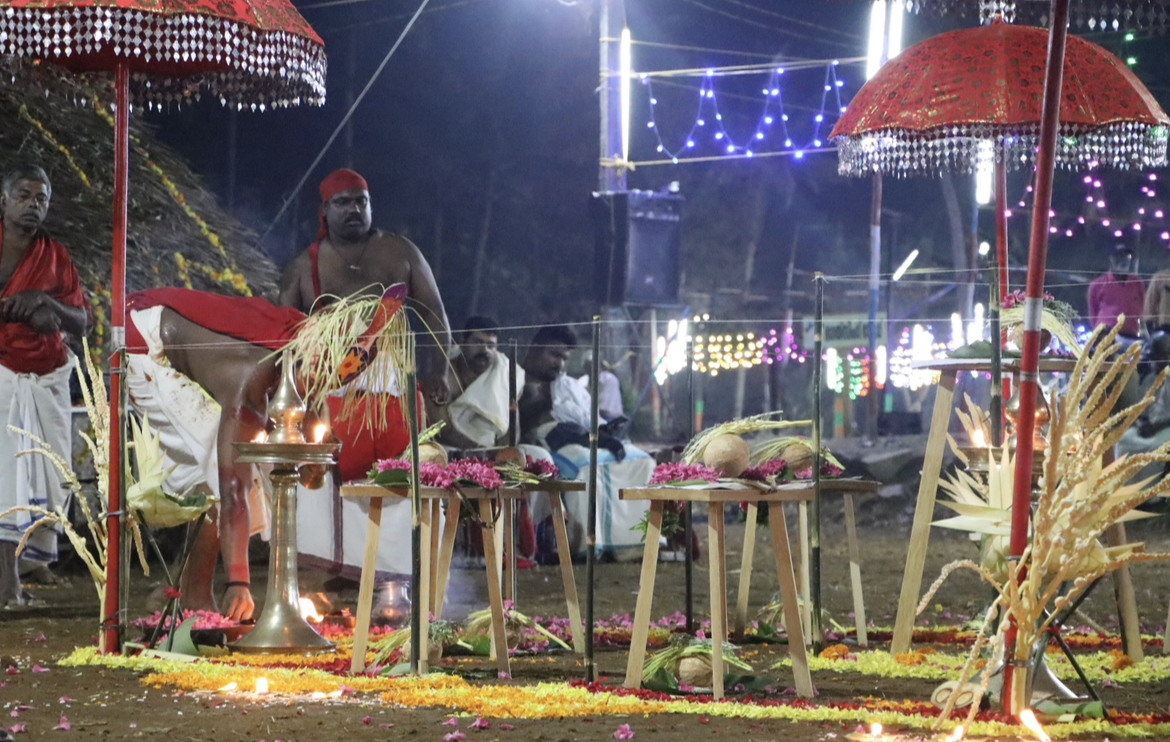
Performing Uchabali in Vellayani Devi Temple

Uchabali is another custom performed during the festival. About sixty four gestures like in Kadhakali are used for the performance. Mathsyam, sampannam, chathurasramam, sarppamudra, and jyothimudra are some of the main gestures used. A beautiful crown built of coconut palm is fixed at the spot of Uchabali. Uchabali is performed during midnight.

=== Paranettu ===
It is believed that a fight erupted between Devi and the demon Darikan in sky. The fight is enacted on a specially erected stage, about 100 feet high and is conducted at night known as Paranettu.

=== Nilathilporu ===
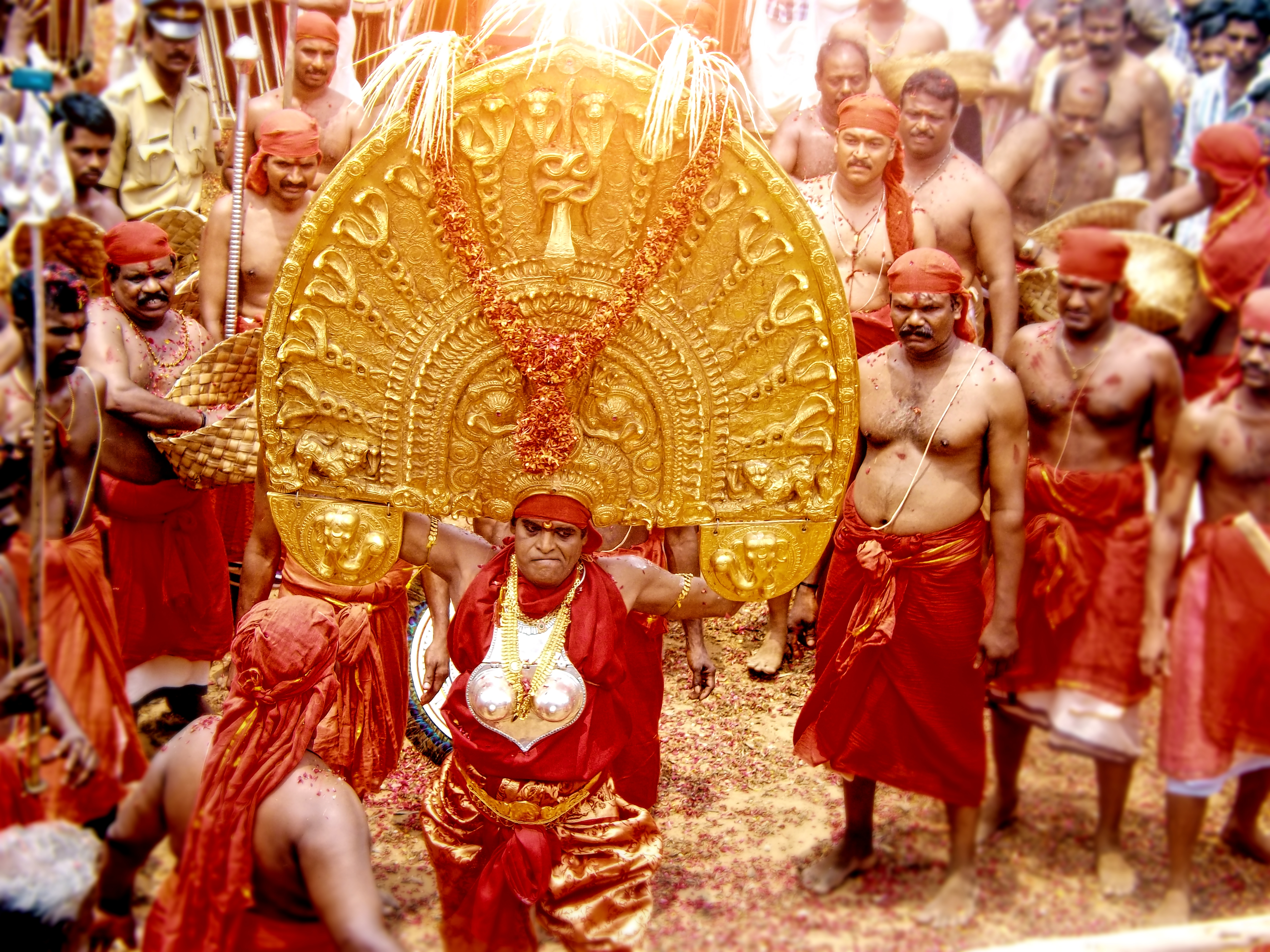
Nilathilporu At Vellayani Devi Temple

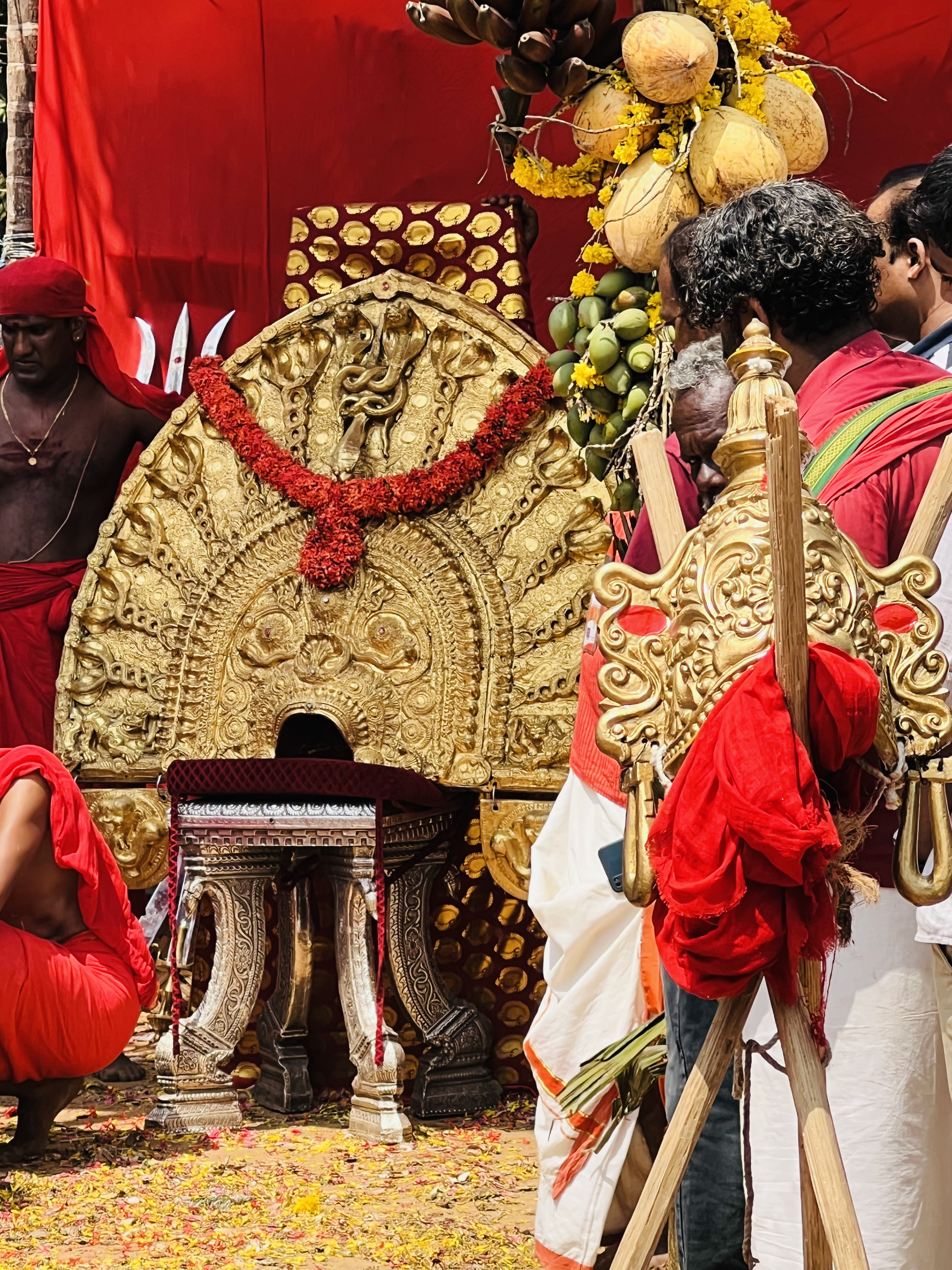
Vellayani Devi after defeating Daarika

Nilathilporu that marks the conclusion of the Kaaliyoottu festival at Vellayani Devi Temple. During the climactic moment of this ceremony, the demon Daarika (the man with the symbolic crown in the foreground) weeps and begs for mercy from the Goddess. Subsequently, the Goddess beheads the demon.

=== Aaraattu ===
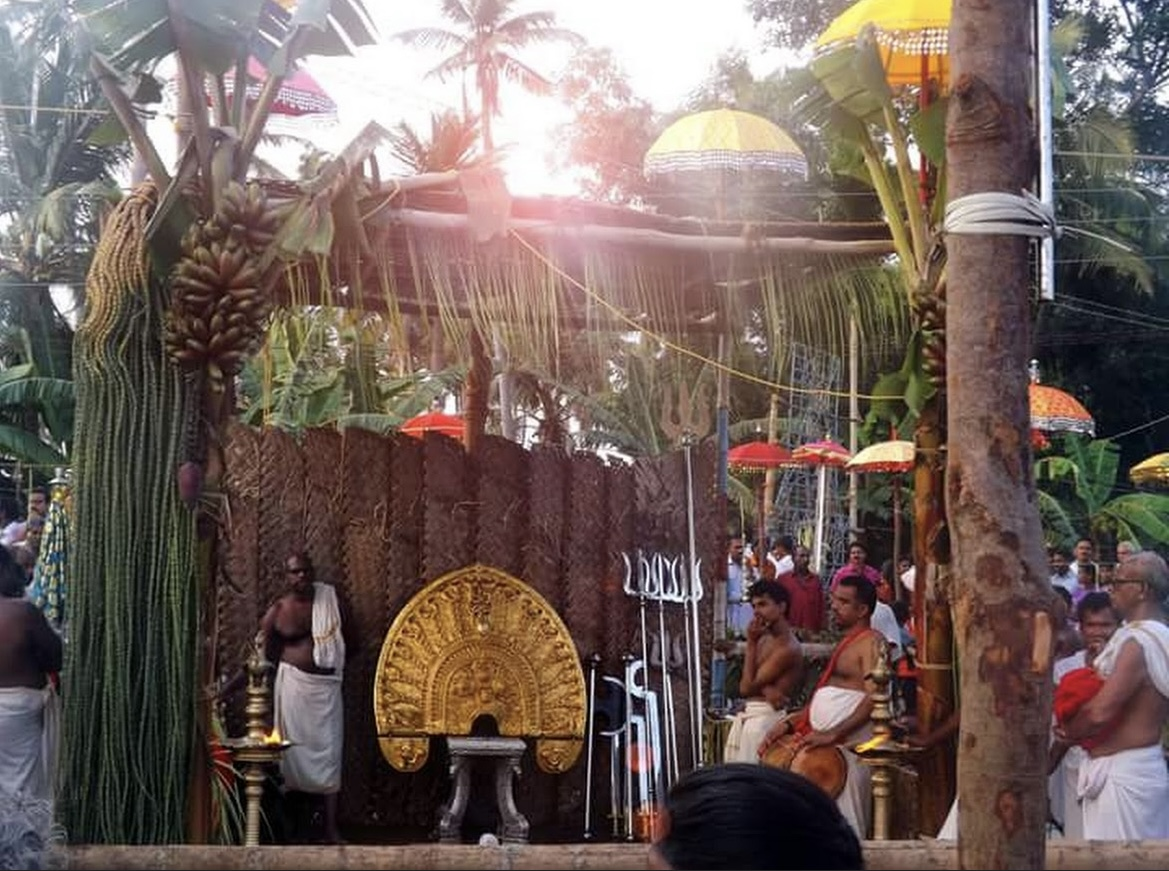
Vellayani Devi’s Aarattu

The festival, Kaliyoottu, ended with a grand procession knows as Aaraattu. During Aaraattu the Idol is cleaned using water collected from 101 pots. Aaraattu is conducted at vellayani lake. A girl from the priest family below ten years of age, along with chief priest performs the function.

== Pooja timing ==
Every day, the temple opens at 5:30 pm and closes at 8:00 pm. On Sunday, Tuesday and Friday, the temple is also open from 12:30 pm to 2:00 pm, during which a special Madhu Pooja is performed for the Goddess. On the first day of all Malayalam months, the temple will open at morning 5:30 am and close at 8:00 am.

== Aswathy Pongala ==
Pongala Festival at Vellayani Devi Temple is celebrated during the Malayalam month of Meenam on the Aswathy Nakshatram (Aswini Nakshatra). Pongala is the rice cooked with jaggery, ghee, coconut as well as other ingredients in the open in small pots by women to please the Goddess

== Fireworks blast accident ==
One person died of the five persons who were injured in an explosion in temple firework shed on 26 March 2012. The accident took place around 8.45 a.m. when last-minute arrangements were on for the Aswathi pongala festival at the temple. The embers from an exploded pipe gun fell on the stored explosives resulting in the blast. The compound that housed the fireworks shed was behind the temple and soon after the blast, the area was engulfed in smoke. The police have registered cases against five men for careless handling of explosives.

== See also ==
- List of Hindu temples in Kerala
- Vellayani Lake
- Attukal Temple
- Padmanabhaswamy Temple
- Bhadrakali
