= Sree Bhuvaneswary Temple, Valamchuzhy =

- Sree Bhuvaneswary Temple, Valamchuzhy, Pathanamthitta, Kerala

Religion
- Affiliation: Hinduism
- District: Pathanamthitta
- Deity: Bhuvaneswary
- Festivals: Rudrapongala, Padayani

Location
- Location: Valamchuzhy
- State: Kerala
- Country: India
- Interactive map of Sree Bhuvaneswary Temple, Valamchuzhy
- Coordinates: 9°15′37.4″N 76°47′57.5″E

Architecture
- Type: Architecture of Kerala

Specifications
- Temple: One
- Elevation: 49.38 m (162 ft)

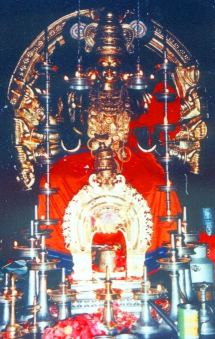
Kodungallur Bhagavathy

Sree Bhuvaneswary Temple, Valamchuzy is one of the oldest temples in Pathanamthitta, South India.

== Location ==
This temple is located with the geographic coordinates of (9°15′37.4″N 76°47′57.5″E) at an altitude of about 49.38 m above the mean sea level.

The temple is 3 kilometres (1.9 mi) from the city centre. Sree Bhuvaneswary Temple is surrounded by the sacred river Achankovil, which has its origin in the Achankovil mountain ranges. The name "Valamchuzy" is derived from the fact that the river circumvents the temple on three sides. Due to the action of the river over the past 3,000 years, large tracts of land belonging to the temple have been washed away. The temple presently is well protected from floods. Formerly this area was under dense forests, and remnants can still be seen in the Sarpakavu (sacred serpent grove). The Sarpakavu is home to a large variety of rare medicinal herbs. Illegal sand mining from the river is posing a danger to the Sarpakavu.

As elsewhere, the great floods of 1096 had repercussions in Pathanamthitta, and they caused severe damage to the temple. However, after the floods had receded much reclamation and maintenance work were undertaken by the temple authorities with the active participation of the government and the landlords near the temple. A bund was constructed to make access to the Sree Bhuvaneswary Temple easier.

The temple continued to be under the patronage of the Velluvettuvelil Madam family until 1974. They served as the priests. Later on, the temple administration passed to the senior members of the 14 Karas hailing from Pathanamthitta municipality, Pramadam, and Mylapra Panchayats. A Devasom council and a team of 14 executives are elected every two years from these 14 Karas. The administration is on the lines of the Indian Parliament.

== Legend ==
Legend has it that a devotee brought a flower from Kodungallur Bhagavathy Temple that was the incarnation of the goddess Bhuvaneswary. The devotee received a divine inspiration that he should install the flower at Valamchuzy, where the river Achankovil circumvents the place from three sides. The residents of the surrounding area gathered together and decided that a temple should be built there to install the goddess Bhuvanaswary. The devotee and his long line of successive generations continued to act as the torch bearers of the temple. The sword and the Chilambu brought from Kodungalloor are displayed at the temple. The Kodungallur Bhagavathy Temple and Valamchuzy temple are similar in several aspects. It is believed that animal sacrifice existed here at one point.

== Festivals ==
Rudrapongala, held in the Malayalam calendar month of Kumbham on the Bharani days, constitutes the main offering to the deity. Many devotees from all over the country throng to this shrine during the Makarabharani festival. It is believed that if appindy is ceremoniously carried by the devotees, it will cure them from all forms of incurable diseases and sorrows.

The birthday of the Goddess is celebrated on the Bharani day, in the Malayalam calendar month of Makaram. The flag hoisting signalling the start of the festival is held on the Pururuttathy day of Makaram, and concludes with the Aaraattu on the tenth day. The most auspicious day is on the fifth day of the festival, which coincides with the birthday of the goddess Bhuvanaswary. This particular day is marked by a lot of celebrations and festivities.

The Padayani, held in the Malayalam calendar month of Meenam, is celebrated with utmost devotion and fervor. Newborn babies are brought in cradles and placed in front of the goddess. This ritual is specific to this temple, and it attracts devotees from every corner of Kerala and beyond.

== See also ==
- Pathanamthitta District
- Temples of Kerala
- Kodungalloor
