= Gavi, Kerala =

Gavi
- Village
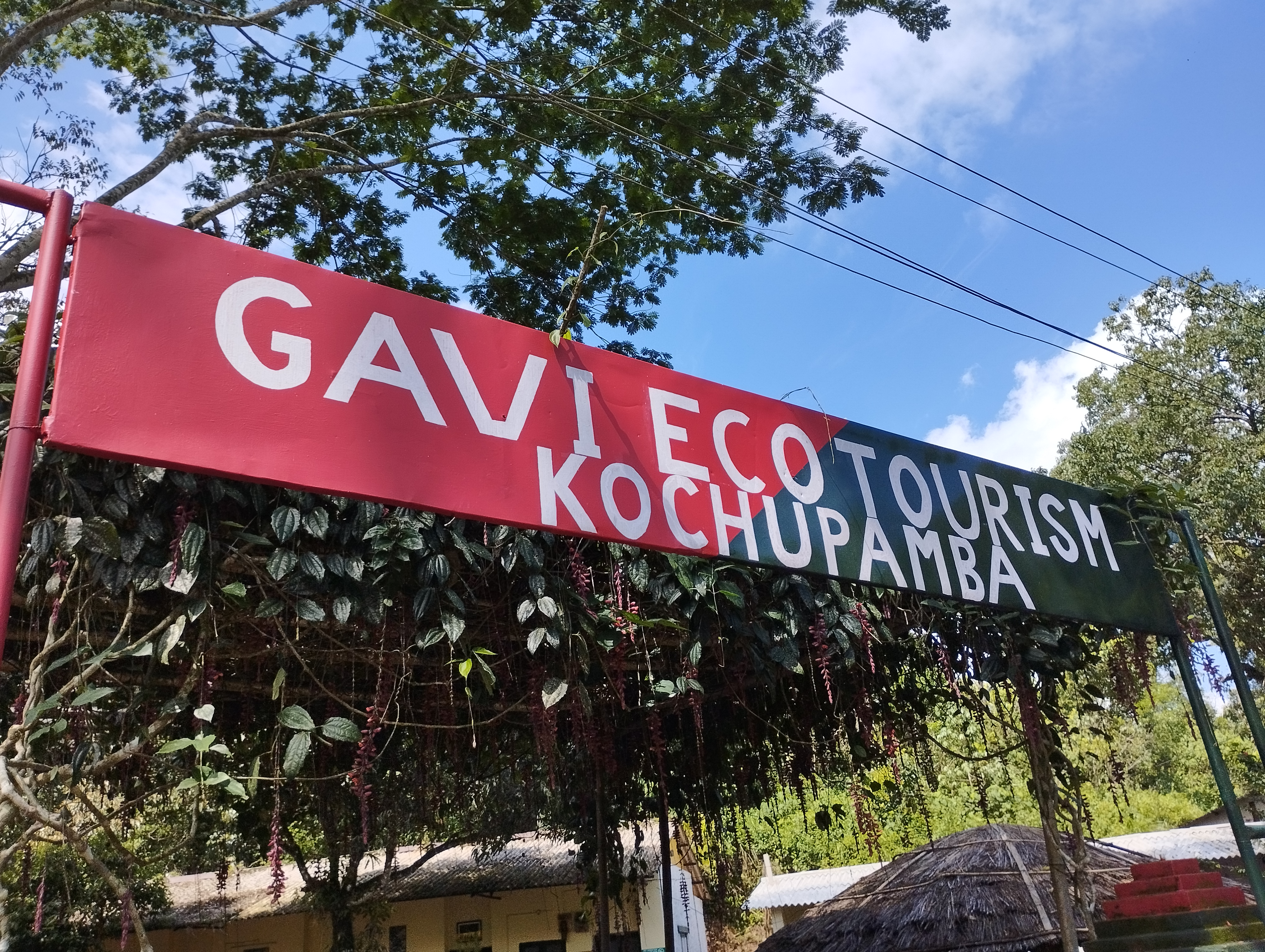
- Gavi, Kerala

- Location in Kerala, India Gavi (India)
- Coordinates: 9°26′25.72″N 77°9′37.25″E
- Country: India
- State: Kerala
- District: Pathanamthitta district
- Named for: Tourism

Government
  - Type: Panchayath Seethathodu
  - Rank: Konni taluk
- Elevation: 1,036 m (3,399 ft)

Languages malayalam
  - Official: Malayalam, English
- Time zone: UTC+5:30 (IST)
- PIN: 685 565
- Telephone code: 04865
- Vehicle registration: KL-62, KL-03, KL-83.

Gavi (Malayalam: [ɡɐʋi, ɡeʋi]) is a village in Pathanamthitta district in Thiruvalla, Kerala, India.The nearest railway station is Thiruvalla (120 km). It is located 28 km southwest of Vandiperiyar, a town in Idukki on N.H 220, the highway connecting Kollam and Madurai. Until 2012, Gavi was not known to many people and it became a major tourist destination after the release of Malayalam movie Ordinary, which was mainly shot at Gavi.

== Getting there ==
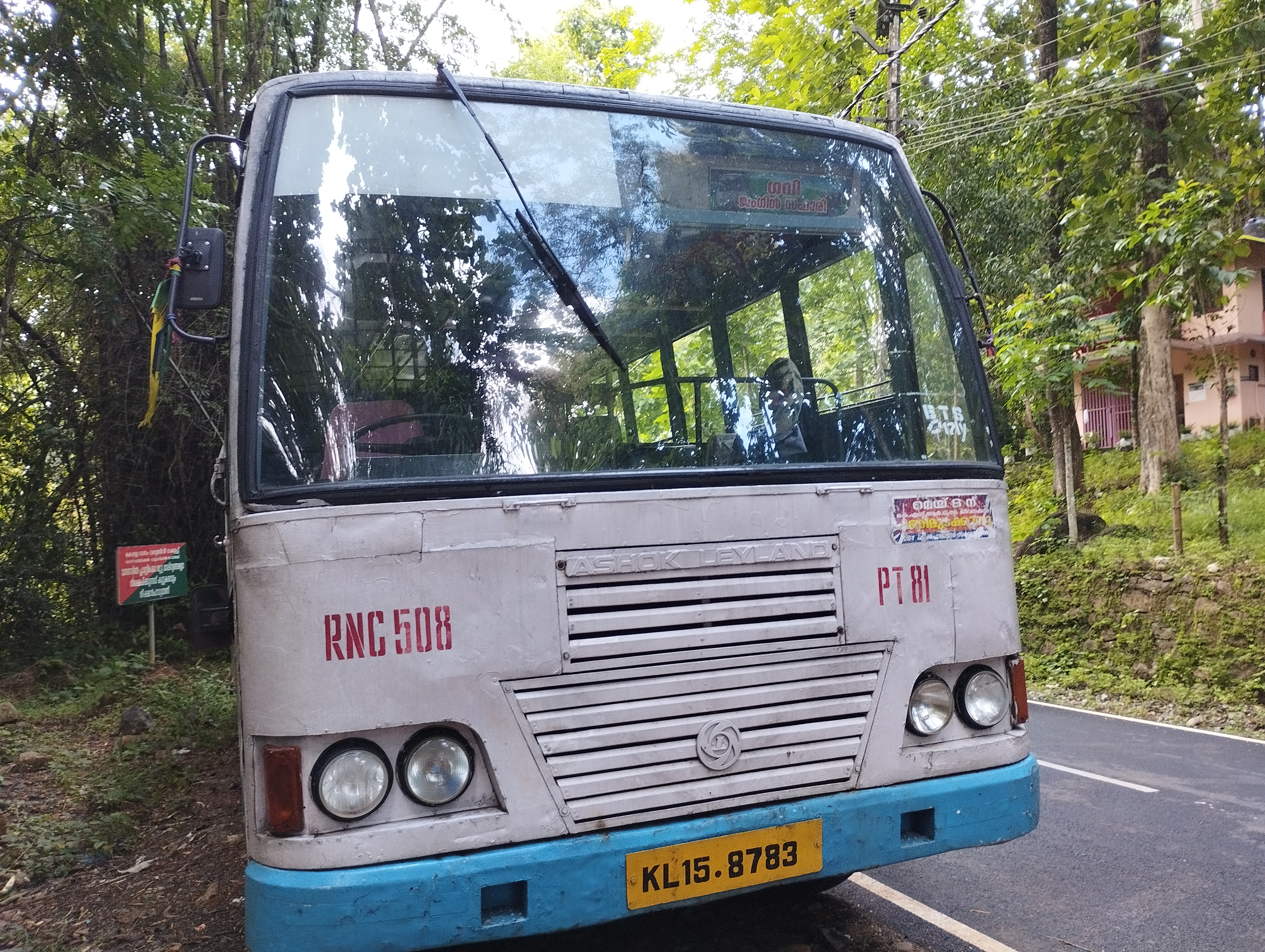
Gavi KSRTC

The nearest railway station is Chengannur (120 km).

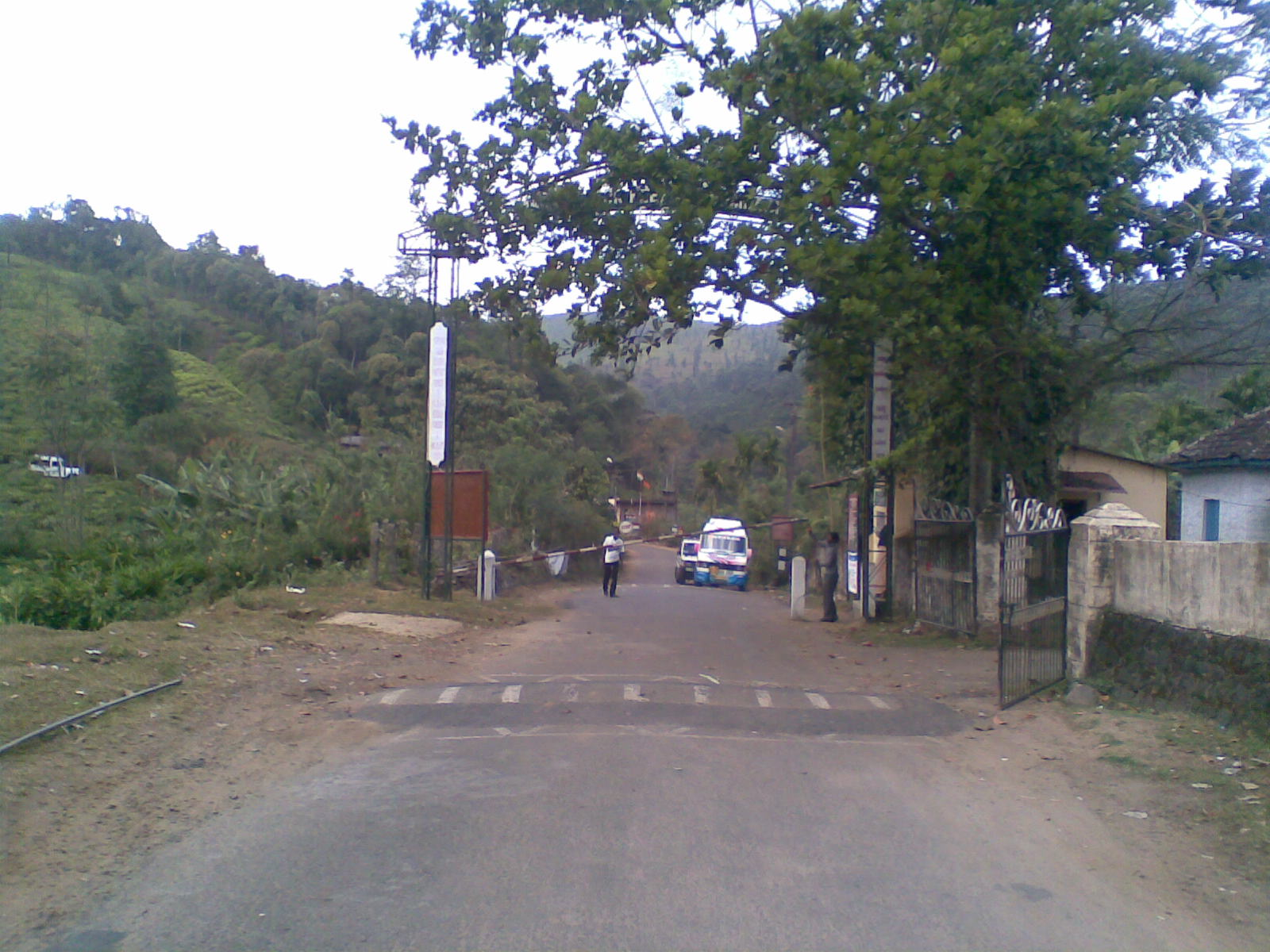
Vallakadavu check post near Gavi

The nearest railway station to gavi is Chengannur it is about (120 km) from Gavi.

Gavi is 14 km south west of Vandiperiyar, 28 km from Kumily, near Thekkady. Gavi is inside the Ranni reserve forest. Gavi is a part of Seethathode Panchayath in Ranni Taluk. Gavi is part of the Periyar Tiger Reserve, and the route can be covered by car from Vandiperiyar. Gavi is well known as an ecotourism destination. The entrance fee is 25 rupees per person and 50 rupees per vehicle. Cameras are 25 rupees and video cameras are charged 100 rupees. Both day and night stays are available. Forest tent camping is available from November through March. It has been said that most enjoyable route to Gavi is the way from Pathanamthitta.

Botanists have said that "gopher trees" can be seen in Gavi, Kerala. Gavi's forest area, there are two gopher trees and they are believed to be the only two gopher trees in India. The tree, which is identified as gopher, is known as nirampalli. Gopher wood or gopherwood is a term used once in the Bible. There is no consensus about what modern species is meant by "gopher wood".

The tree standing at Gavi forest is of robust stem and lush foliage. According to state Forest Department officials, though the fully-grown gopher in Gavi is the only such tree sighted in the periphery of the jungle, possibly there could be more such trees still surviving in the inner forests of Periyar Tiger Reserve (PTR) in Kerala.

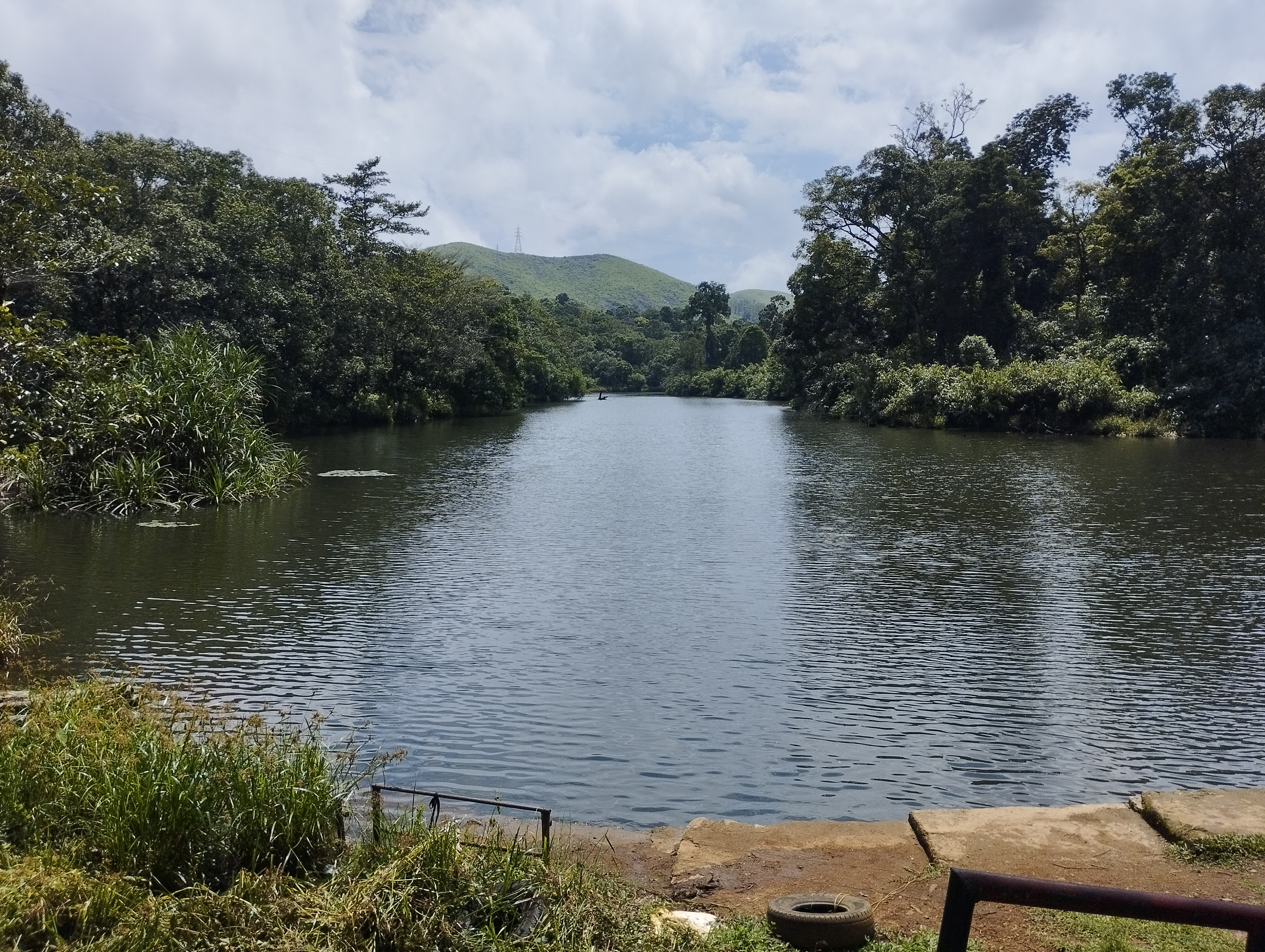
Kochu Pamba

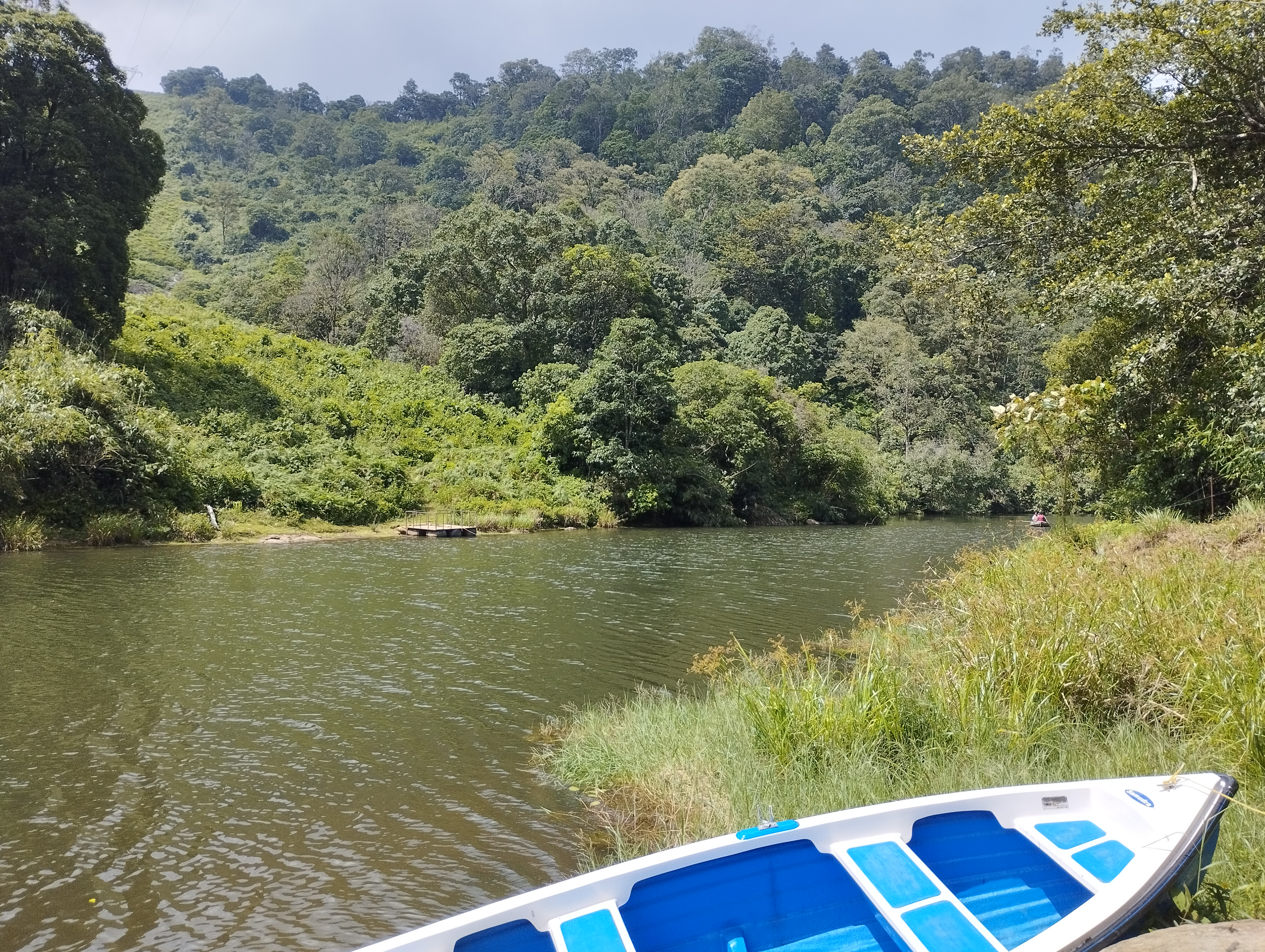
Kochu Pamba

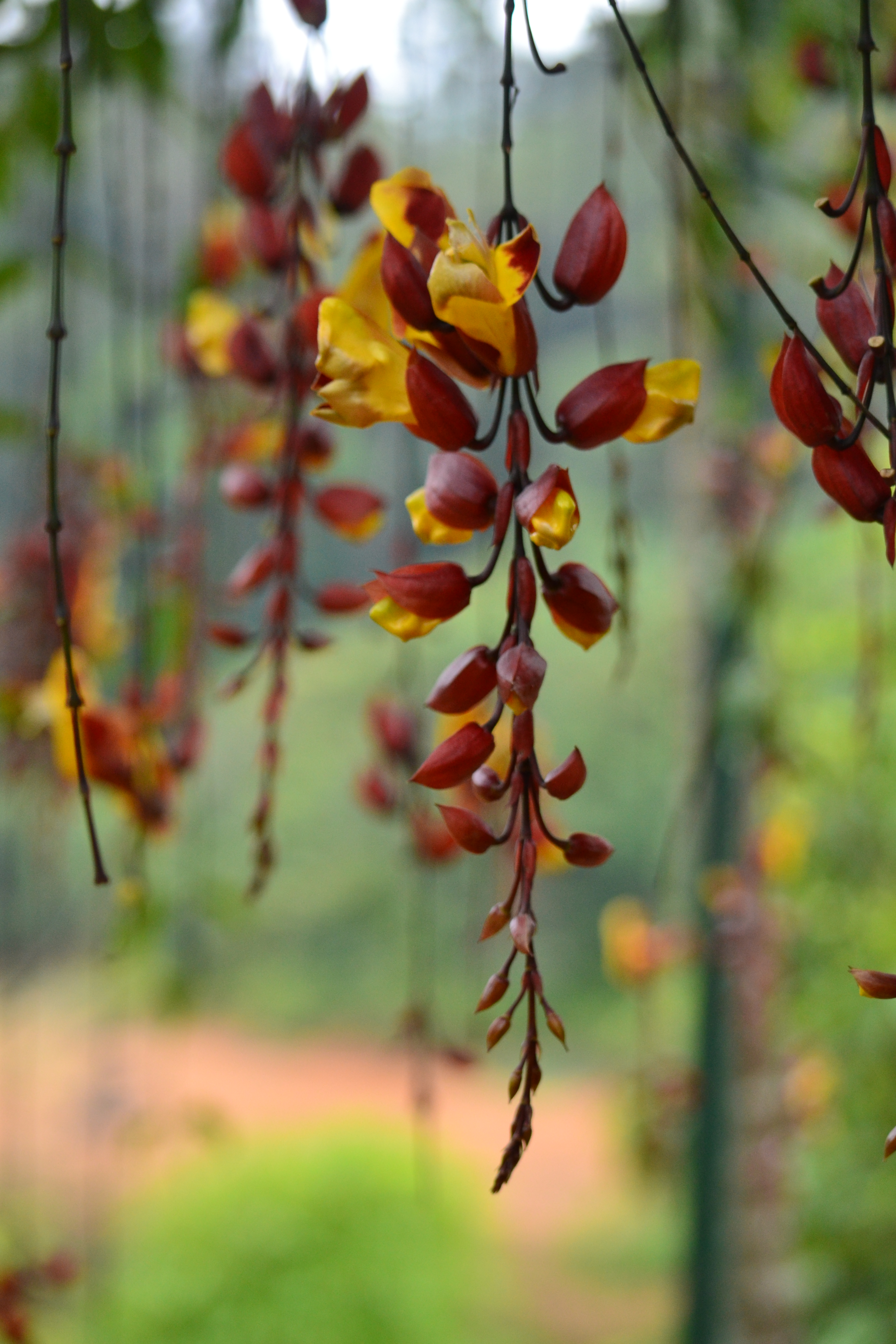
Lady Shoe Flower (Thunbergia mysorensis) in Gavi, Kerala

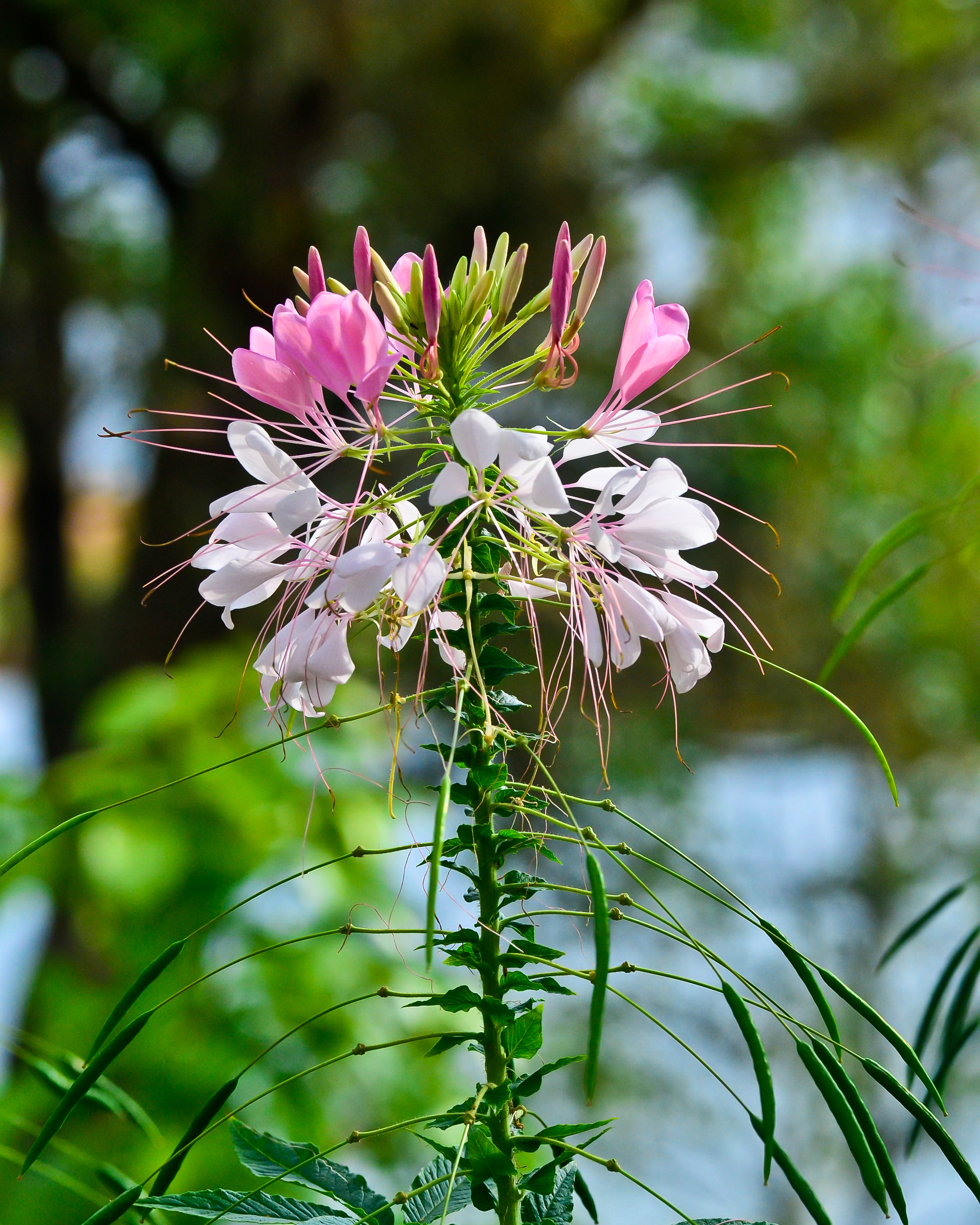
Cleome hassleriana (spider flower) at Periyar National Park, Gavi

== Flora and fauna ==
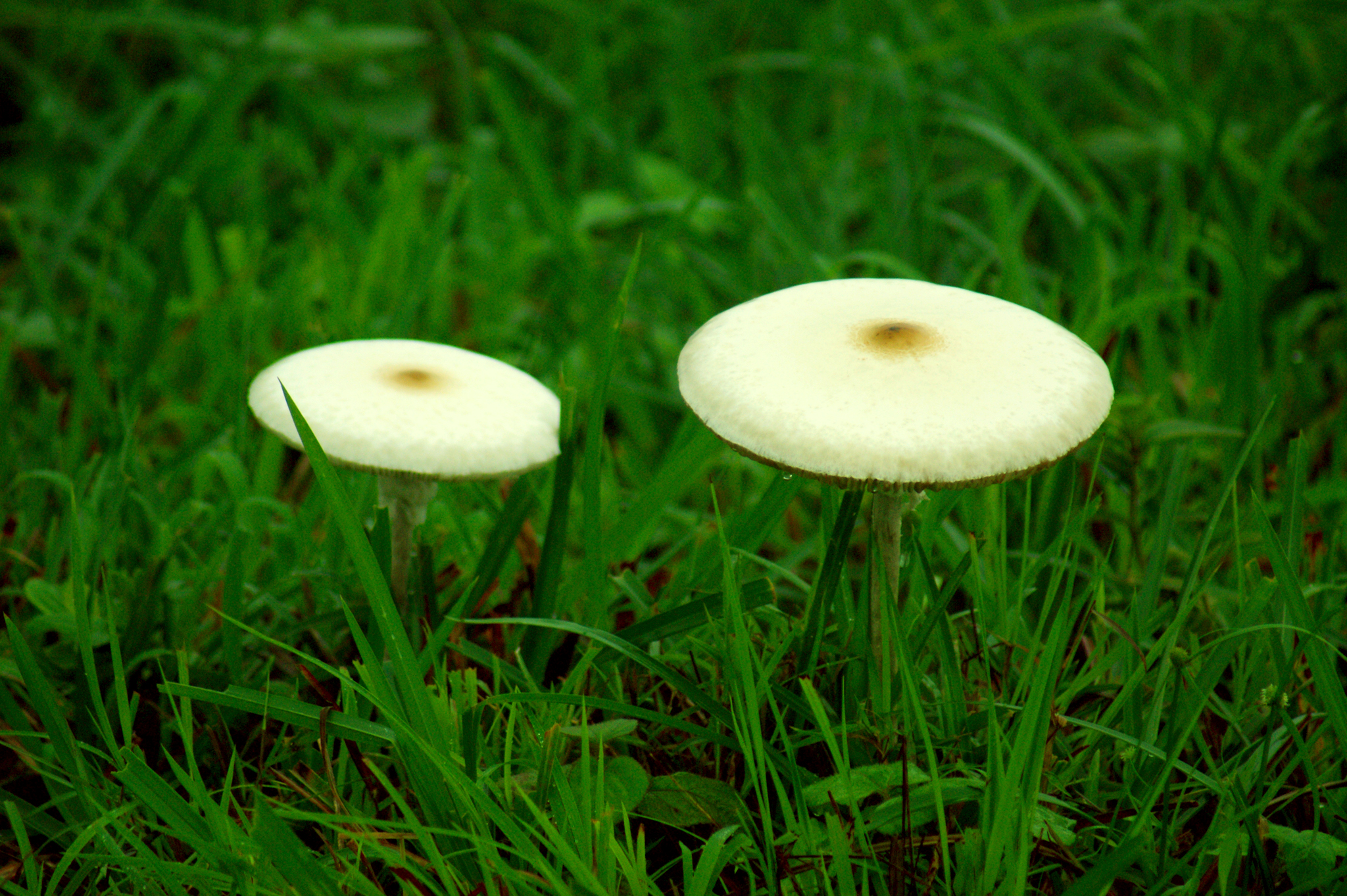
Mushrooms in Gavi

Gavi's evergreen forests are abundant with wildlife including the tiger, elephants, leopards, bears, Indian gaur, sambar, barking and mouse deers, lion tailed macaque, Nilgiri langur, Nilgiri marten, Malabar giant squirrel and more than 250 species of birds.

== Climate ==
Climate data for Gavi, Kerala
Month	Jan	Feb	Mar	Apr	May	Jun	Jul	Aug	Sep	Oct	Nov	Dec	Year
Mean daily maximum °C (°F)	24.3 (75.7)	25.4 (77.7)	27.0 (80.6)	27.3 (81.1)	27.2 (81.0)	25.3 (77.5)	24.3 (75.7)	24.6 (76.3)	25.1 (77.2)	24.5 (76.1)	23.6 (74.5)	23.8 (74.8)	25.2 (77.4)
Mean daily minimum °C (°F)	15.5 (59.9)	16.1 (61.0)	17.4 (63.3)	18.6 (65.5)	19.3 (66.7)	18.6 (65.5)	18.2 (64.8)	18.1 (64.6)	17.9 (64.2)	17.7 (63.9)	16.9 (62.4)	15.9 (60.6)	17.5 (63.5)
Average precipitation mm (inches)	23 (0.9)	32 (1.3)	56 (2.2)	131 (5.2)	168 (6.6)	327 (12.9)	407 (16.0)	256 (10.1)	174 (6.9)	252 (9.9)	183 (7.2)	77 (3.0)	2,086 (82.2)
Source: Climate-Data.org

Summer: February–April, daytime temperatures up to 28 °C. but can drop to 20 °C at night. Monsoon: June–August, daytime temperatures up to 25 °C but can drop to 10 °C at night.

== Gallery ==
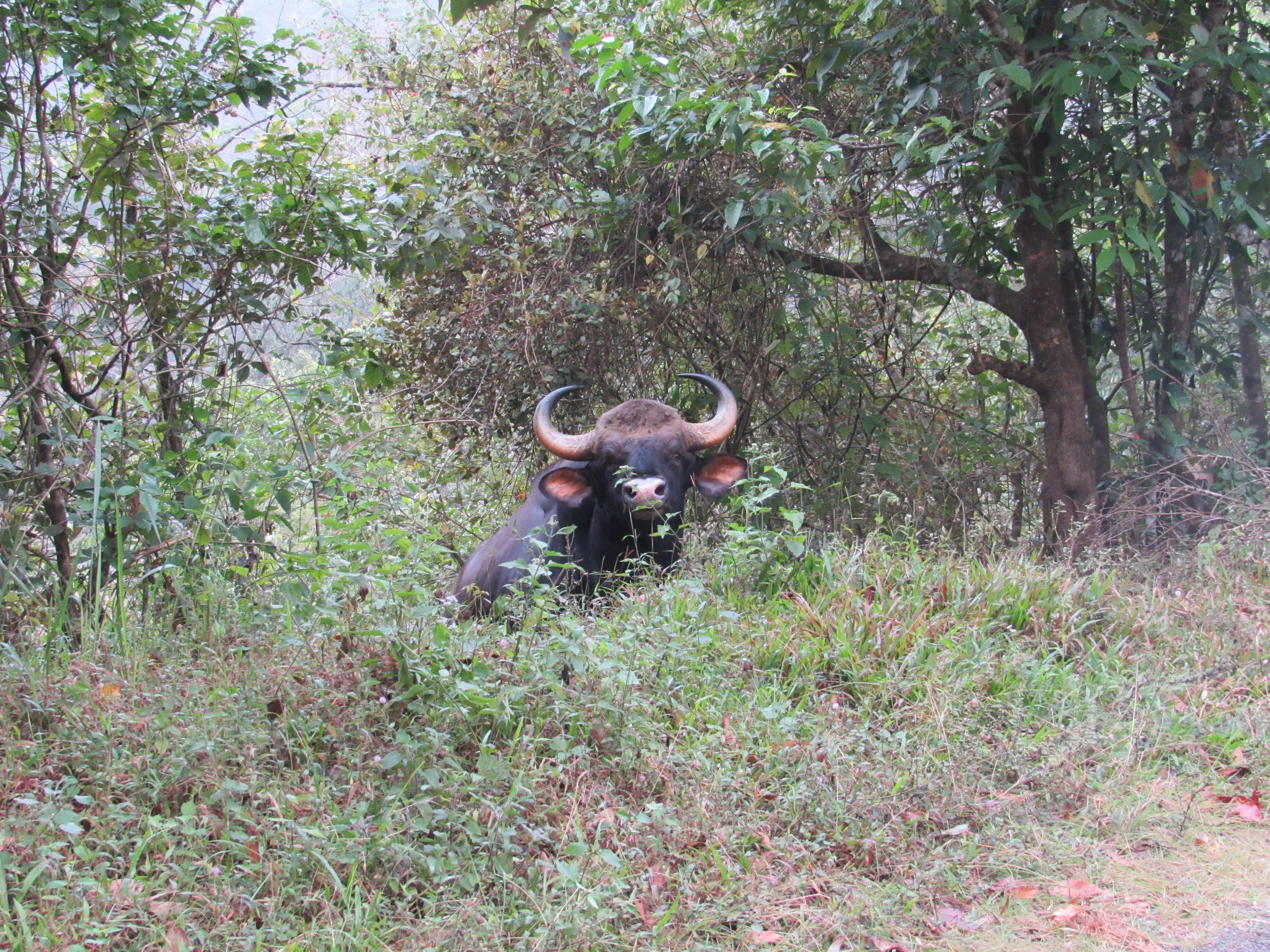
Indian Bison

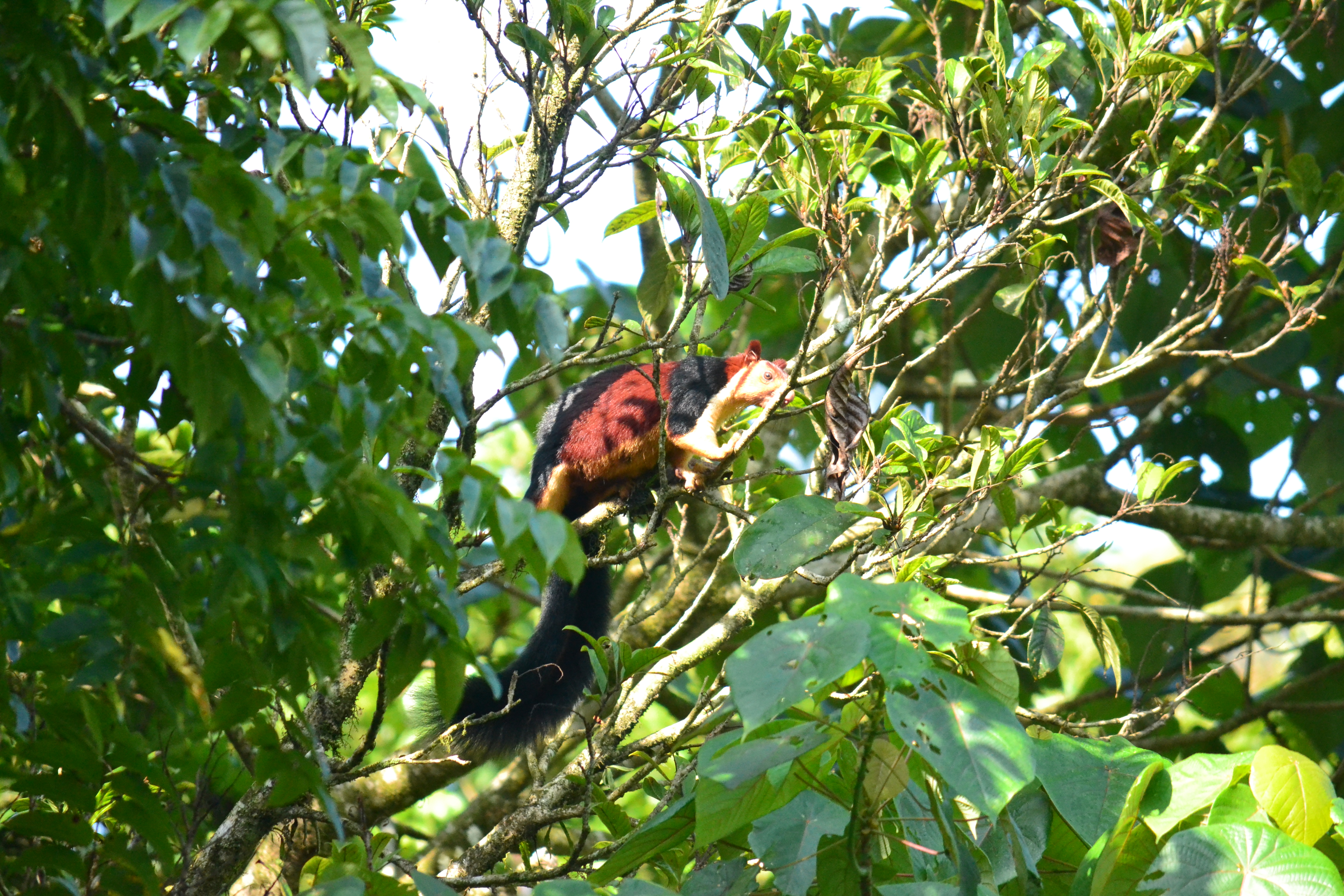
Malabar giant squirrel found in Gavi, Kerala

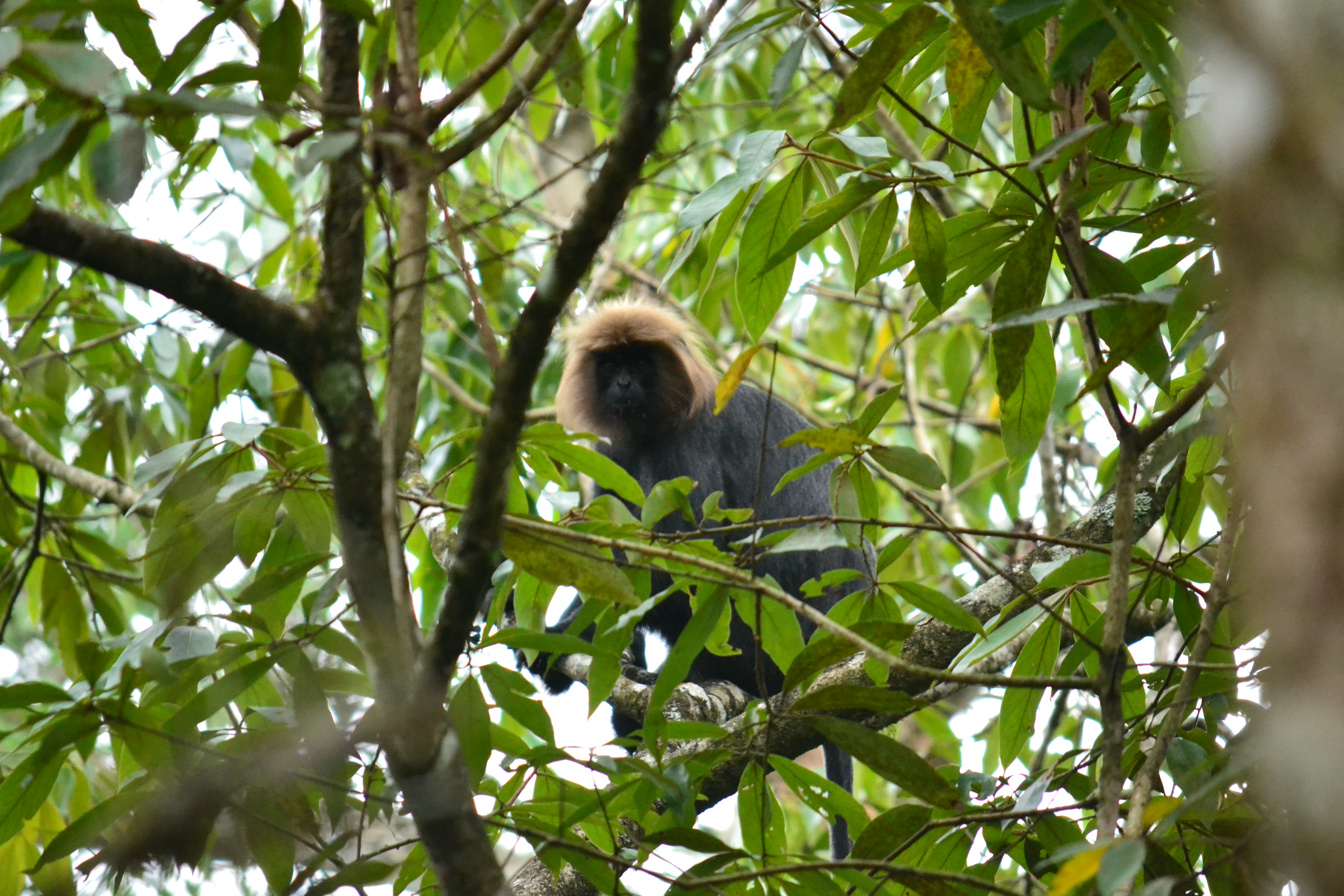
Nilgiri langur gavi

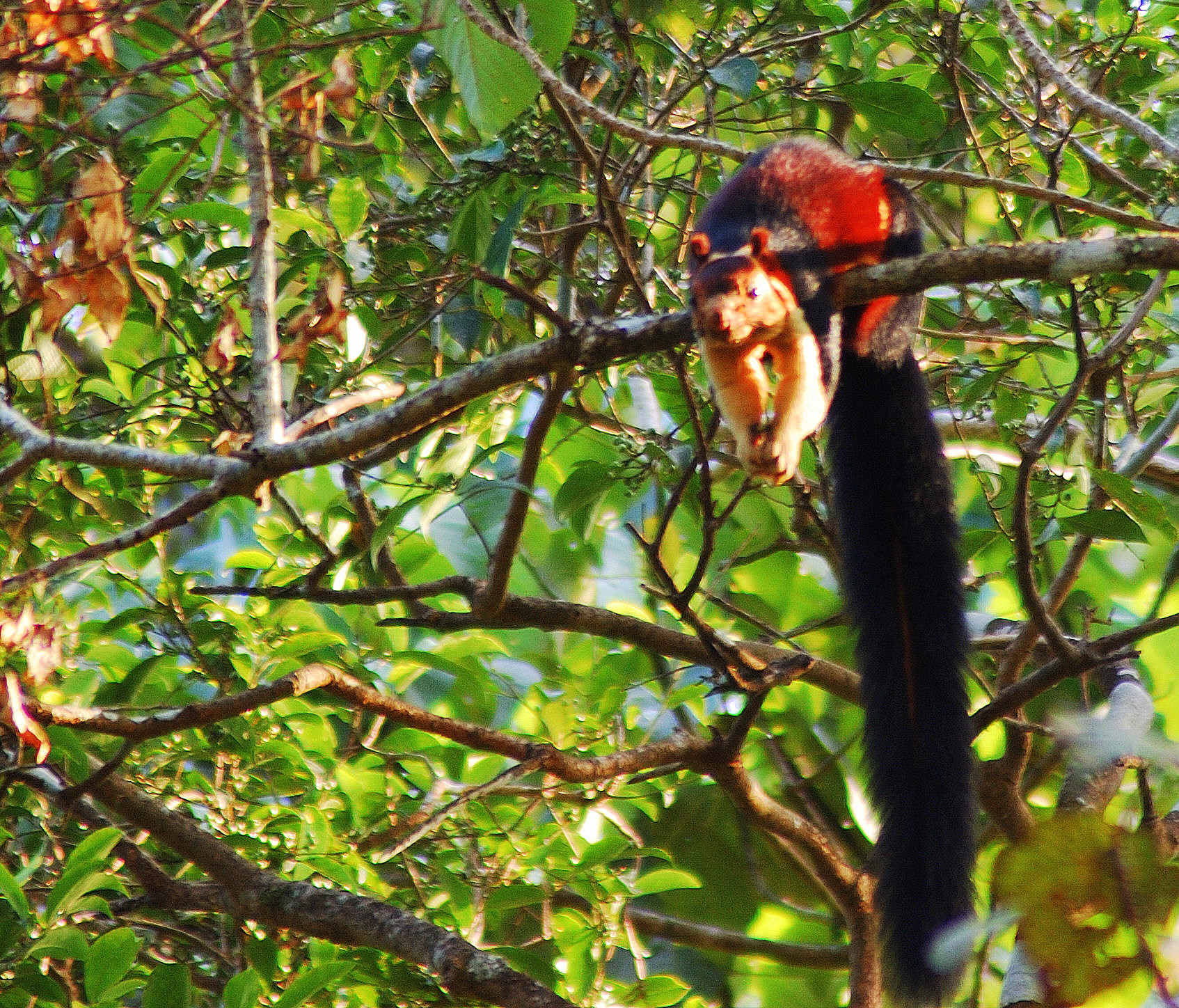
Indian giant squirrel

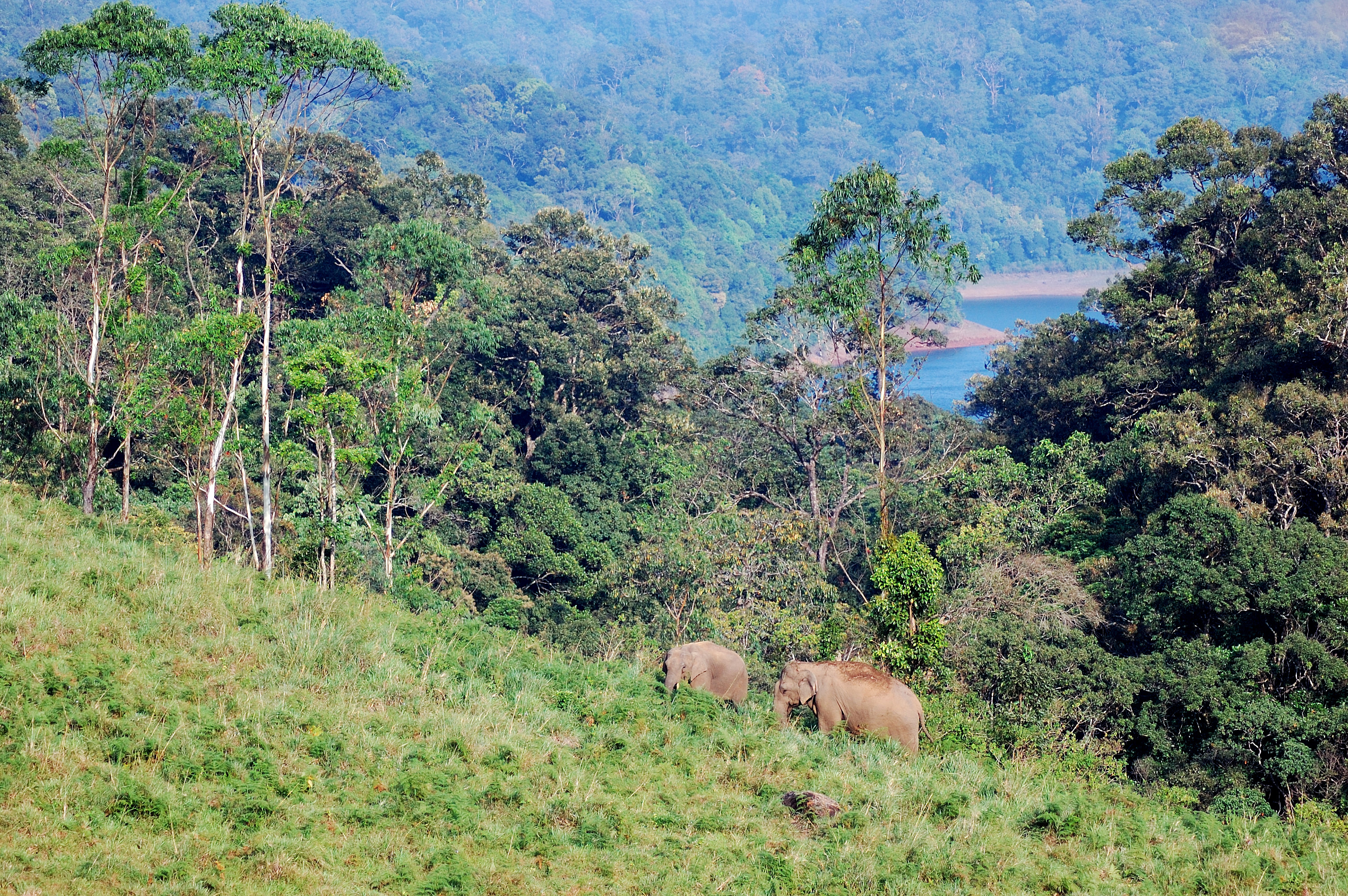
Indian elephants near Gavi

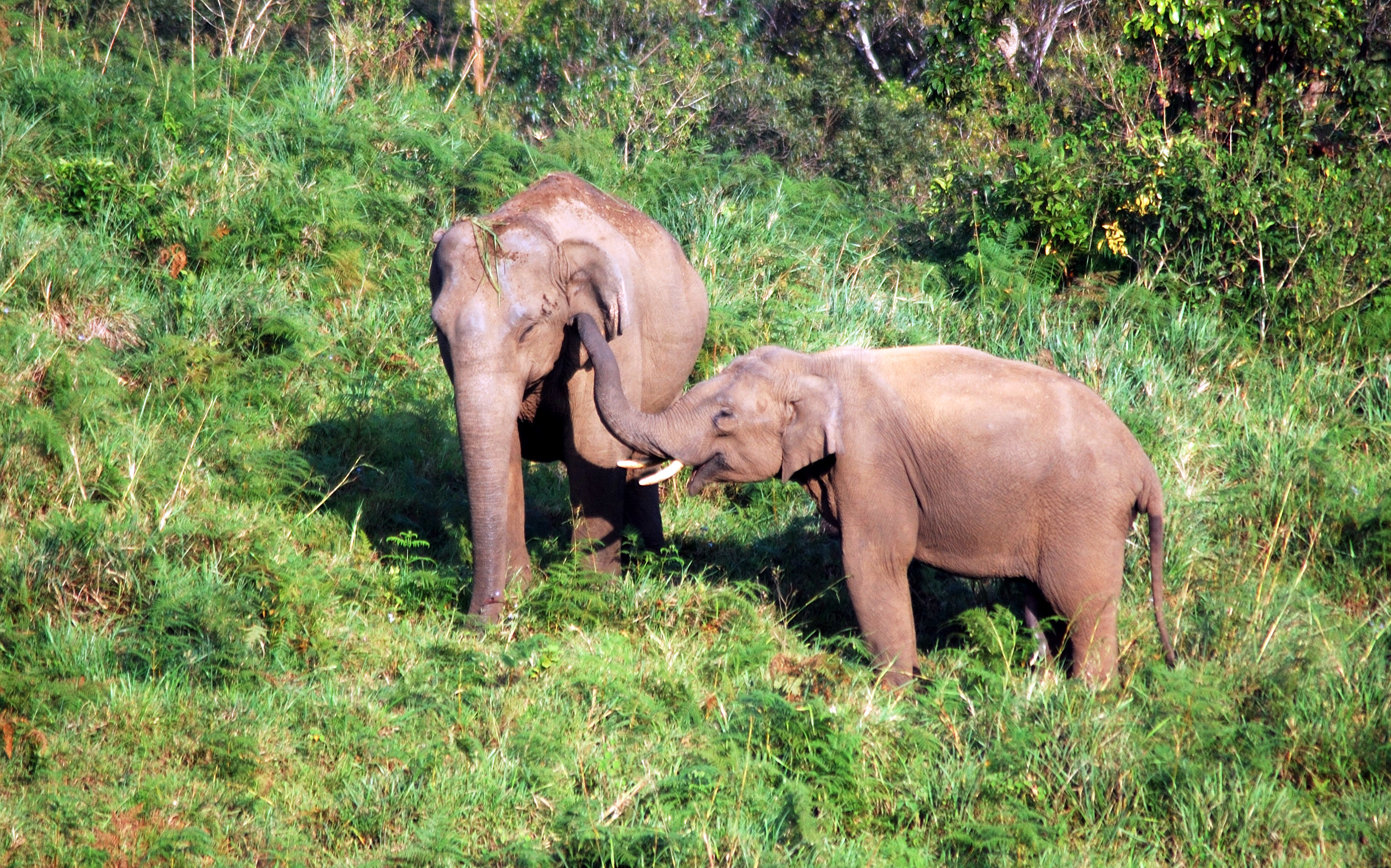
Indian elephants near Gavi

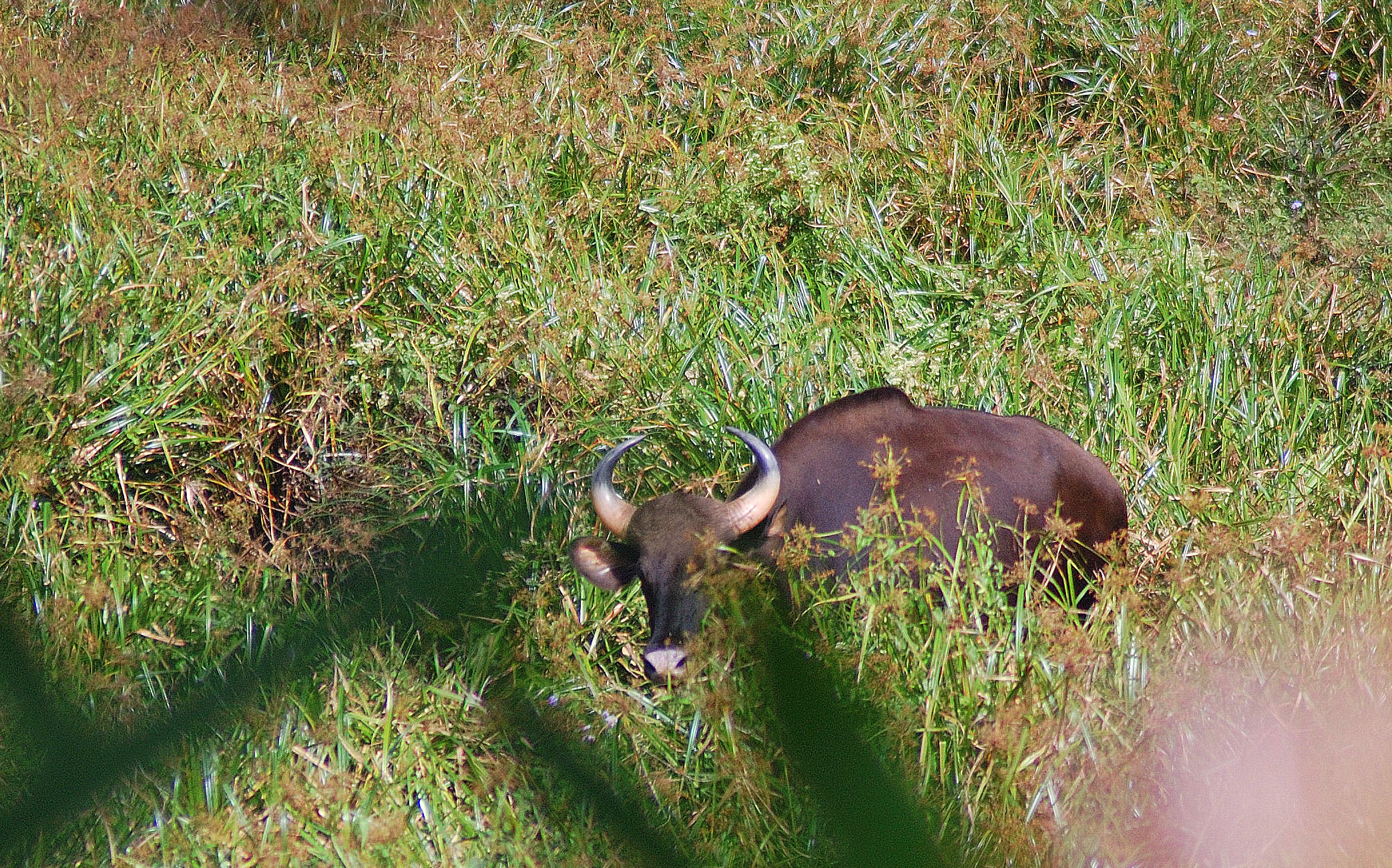
Indian bison (gaur) spotted in Gavi

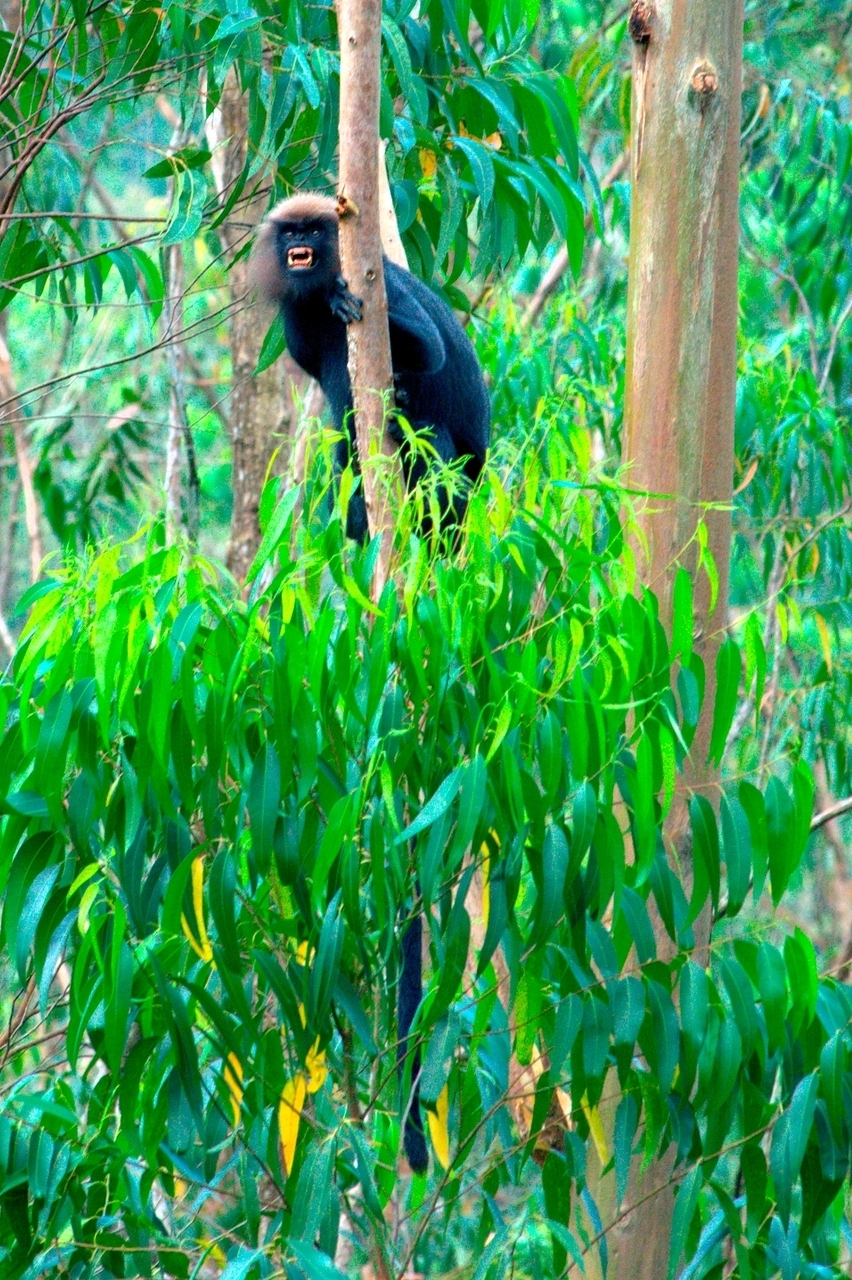
Nilgiri langur on the road from Vandiperiyar to Gavi

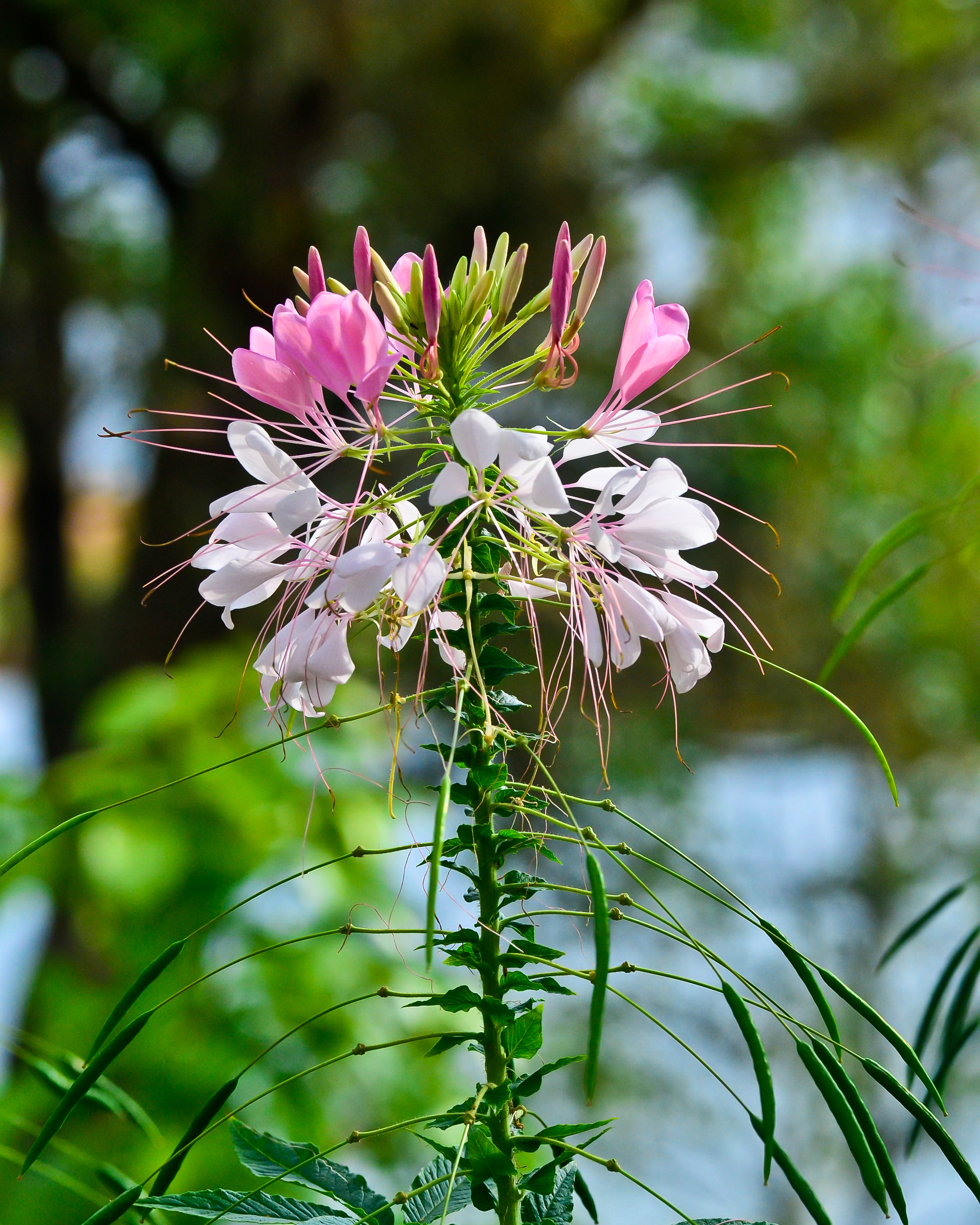
Cleome hassleriana in Gavi

== In visual media ==
The 1973 released Malayalam movie Ponnapuram Kotta was filmed at Echopara and Gavi.

The 2012 Malayalam movie Ordinary was partially shot at Gavi. Gavi became a major tourist destination after the release of Ordinary.
