= Malayalappuzha =

Malayalapuzha
- Village
- Location in Kerala, India Malayalapuzha (India)
- Coordinates: 9°17′0″N 76°49′0″E
- Country: India
- State: Kerala
- District: Pathanamthitta

Government
  - Type: Panchayat

Population (2011)
  - Total: 16,664

Languages
  - Official: Malayalam, English
- Time zone: UTC+5:30 (IST)
- Vehicle registration: KL-03

Malayalapuzha is a village outside the city suburbs of Pathanamthitta in Kerala. It is seven kilometers away from Pathanamthitta central junction and five kilometers from Kumbazha junction. Malayalapuzha is famous its ancient Bhadrakali temple. The place is also famous for its temple elephant Malayalapuzha Rajan, which is 9.5 feet high.

Other than State operated and private buses, jeep service is a popular mode of transportation at Malayalapuzha.

== Demographics ==
As of 2011 India census, Malayalapuzha had a population of 16664 with 7822 males and 8842 females.

== Education ==
- MUSALIAR COLLEGE OF ARTS & SCIENCE, CHEENKALTHADOM, MALAYALAPPUZHA, PATHANAMTHITTA
- Musaliar College of Engineering & Technology, Malayalappuzha, Pathanamthitta
