= Pathanamthitta =

Pathanamthitta Pilgrim Capital of Kerala
- Town
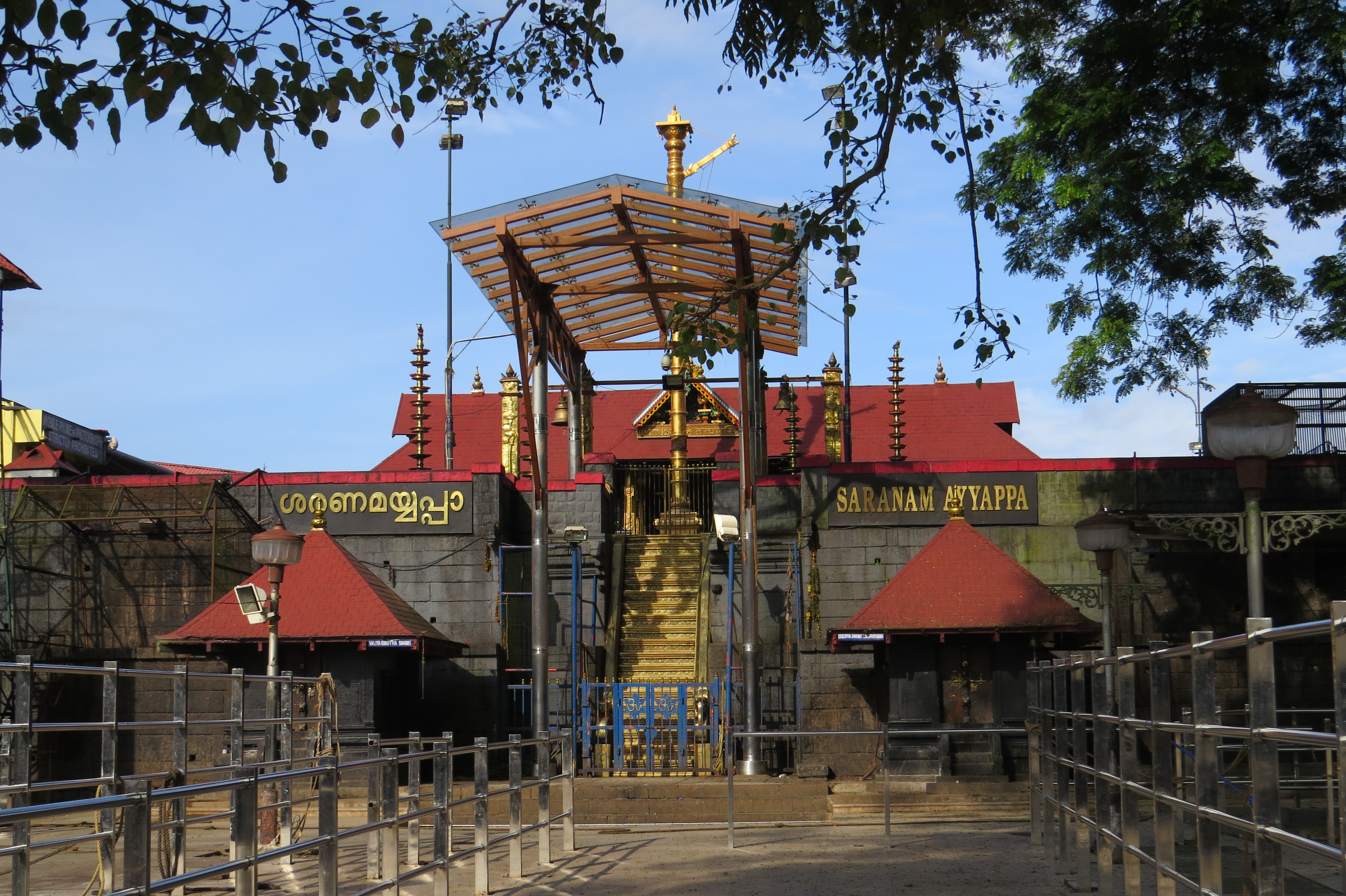
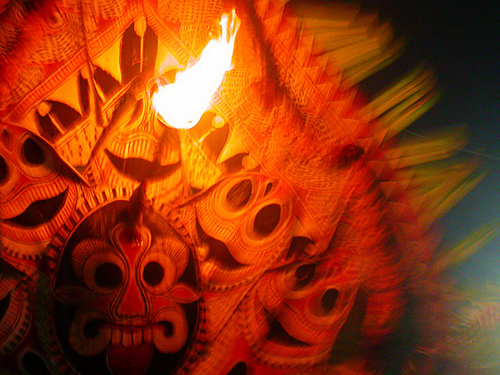
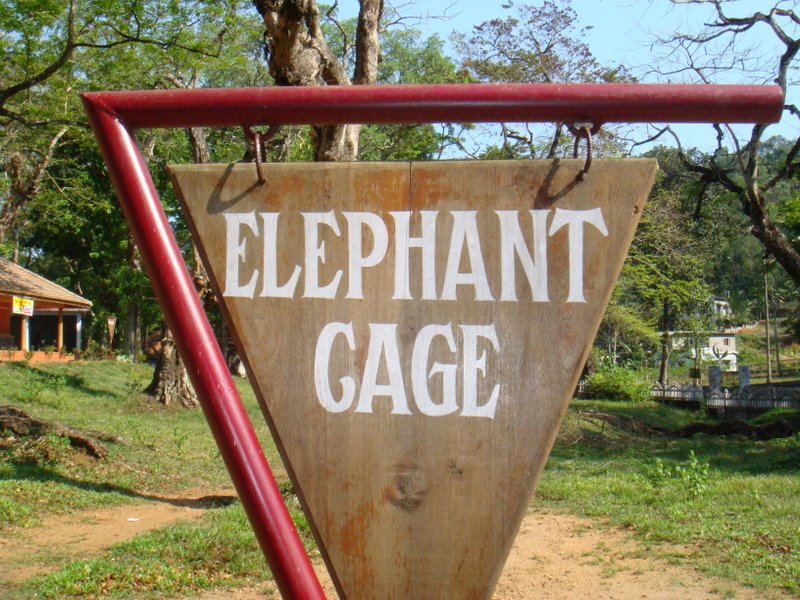
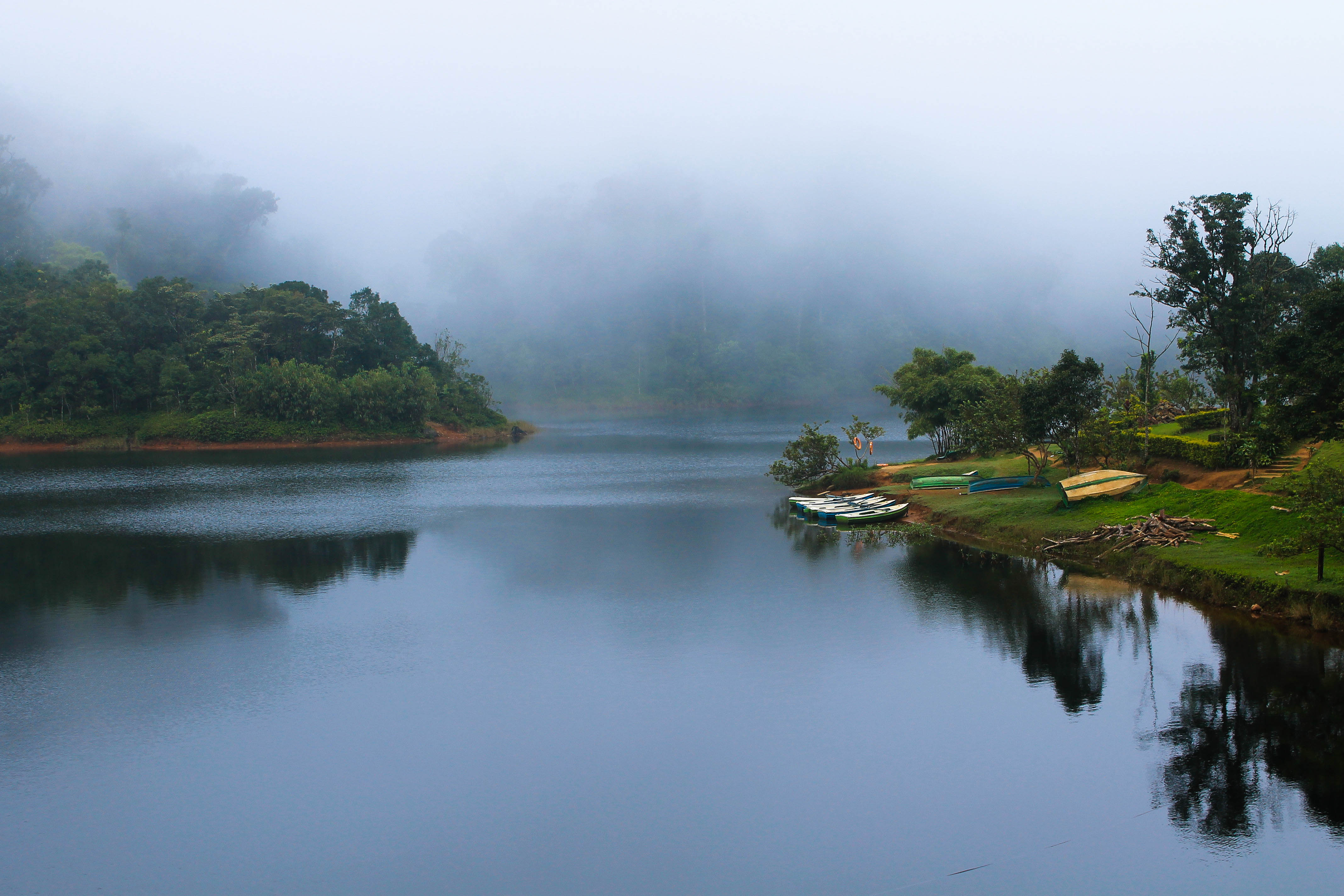
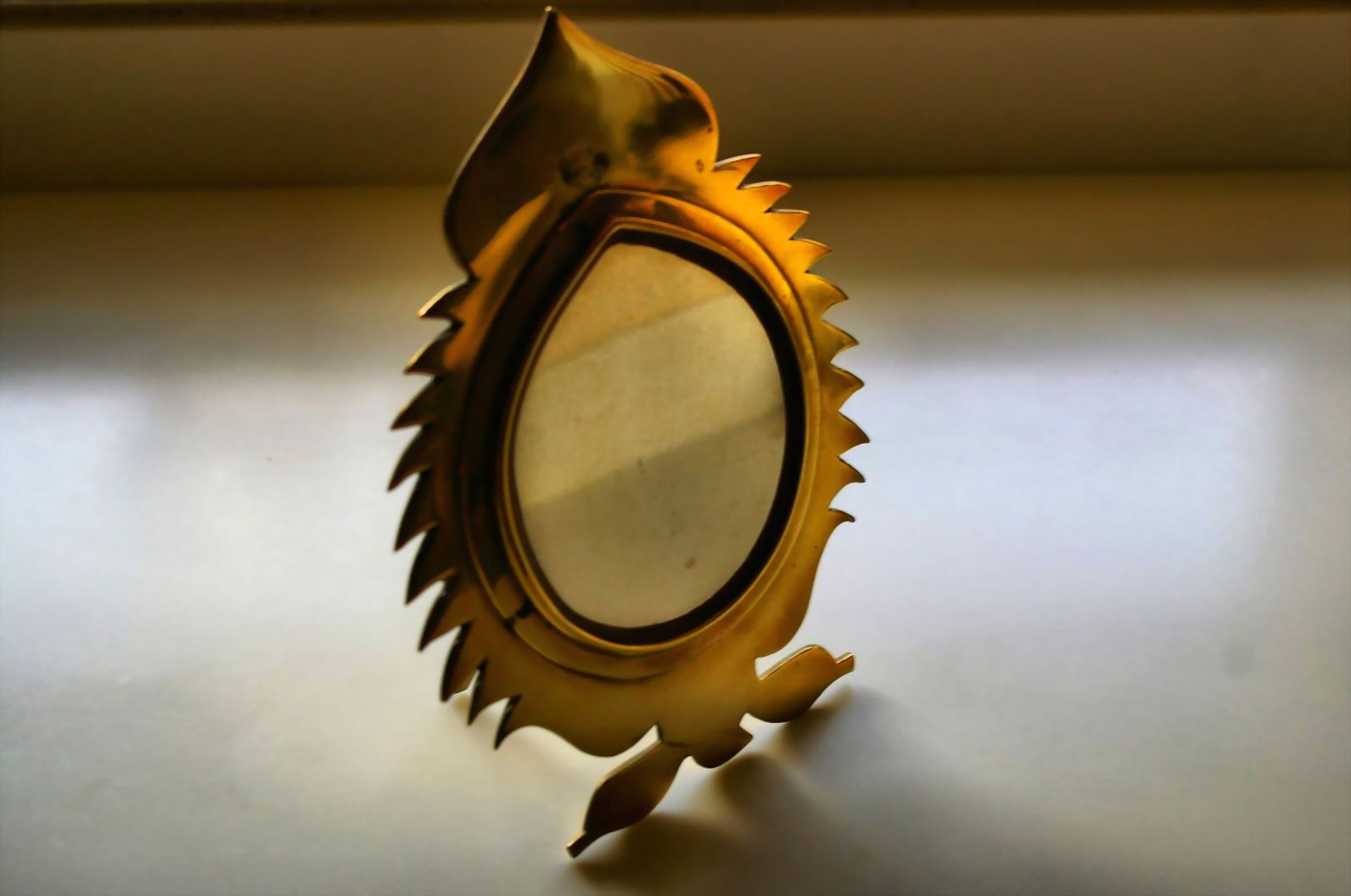
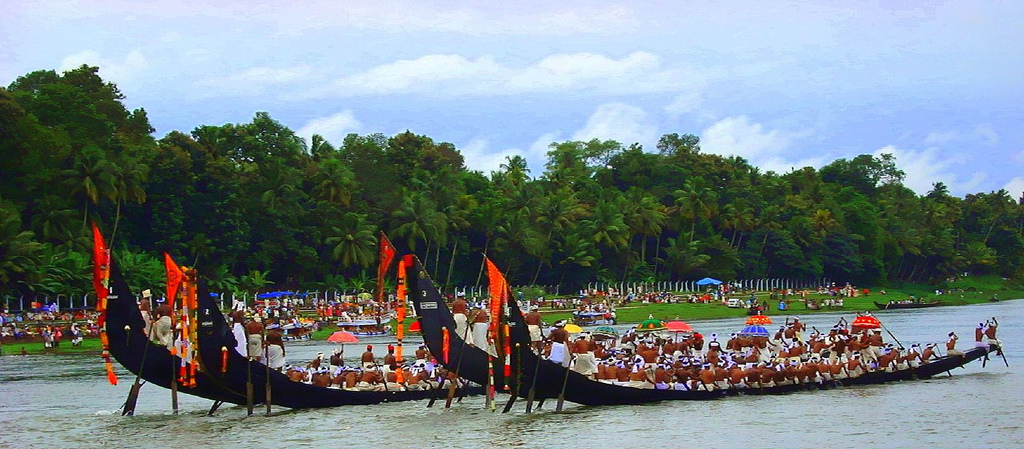
- From left to right : Sabarimala temple, Padayani is an art form, Konni elephant cage, Gavi, Aranmula Mirror, Kerala Boat Race.

- Location in Kerala, India Pathanamthitta (India)
- Coordinates: 9.2648°N 76.7870°E
- Country: India
- State: Kerala
- District: Pathanamthitta
- Founder: K. K. Nair

Government
  - Collector: Prem Krishnan (04/03/2024-Present)

Area
  - Total: 23.50 km^{2} (9.07 sq mi)
- Elevation: 31 m (102 ft)

Population (2011)
  - Total: 37,538
  - Density: 1,597/km^{2} (4,137/sq mi)

Languages
  - Official: Malayalam
- Time zone: UTC+5:30 (IST)
- PIN: 689645
- Telephone code: 0468
- Vehicle registration: KL – 03
- Website: pathanamthitta.nic.in/en/

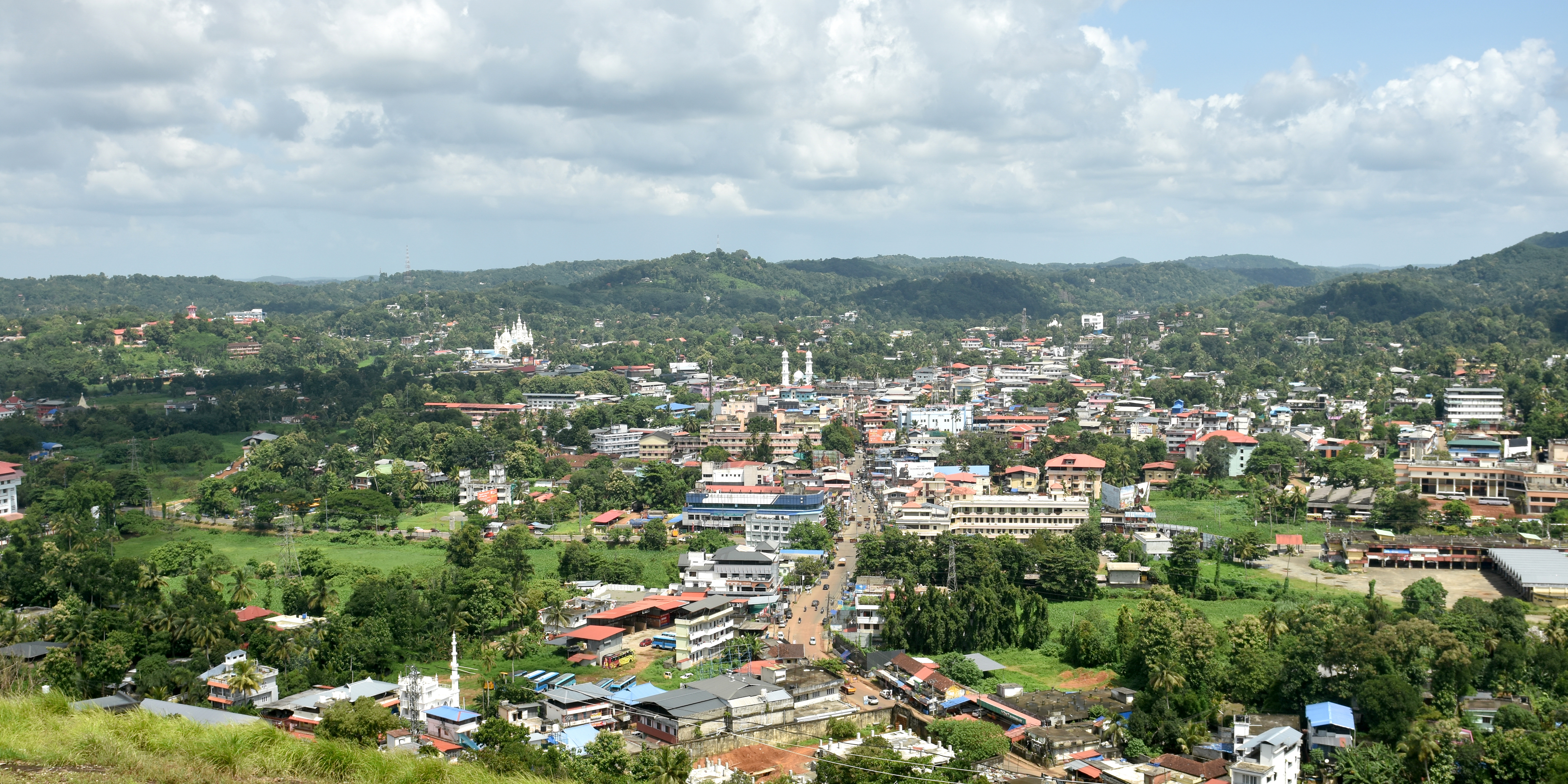
Pathanamthitta Town

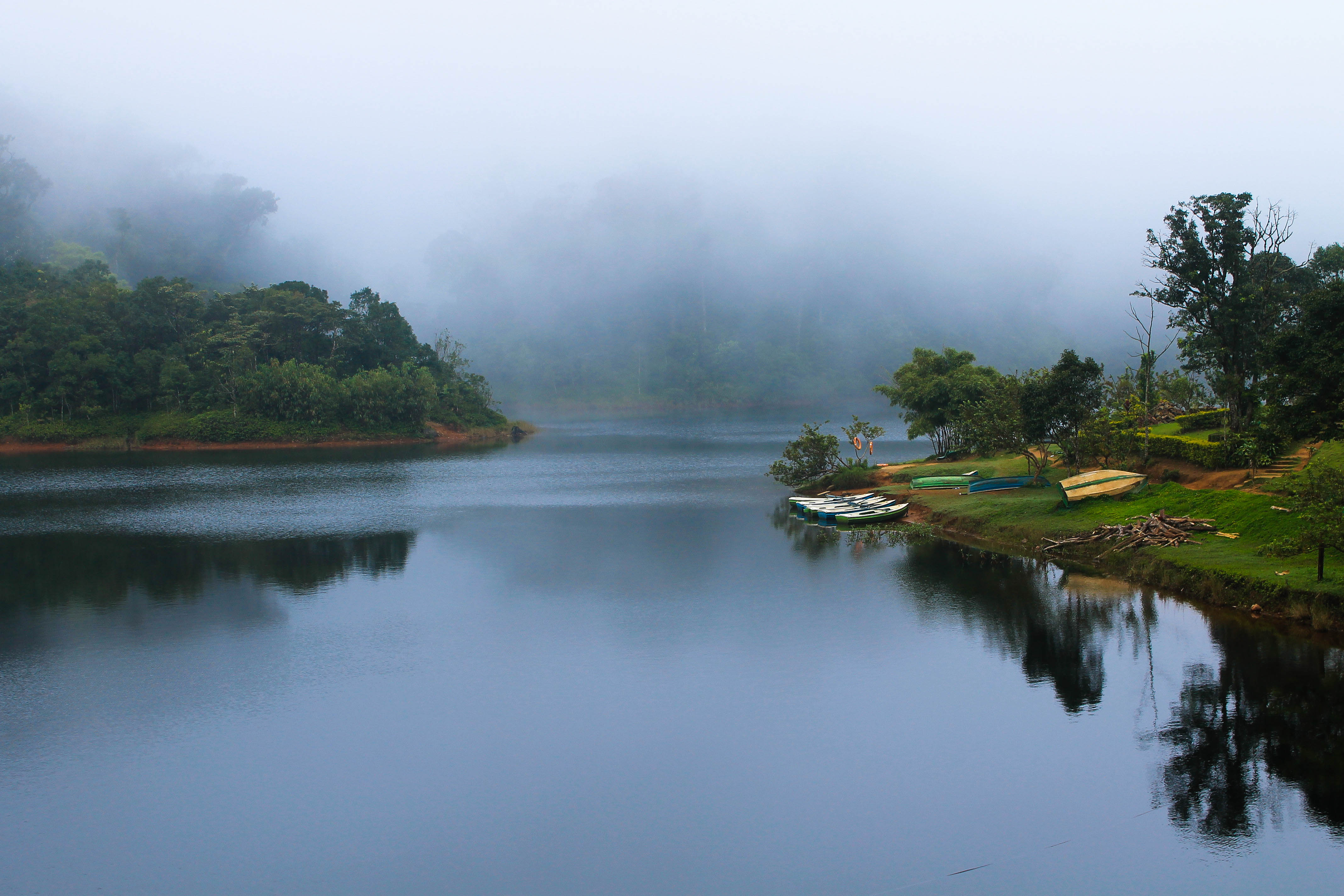
Gavi, a major tourist destination in Pathanamthitta

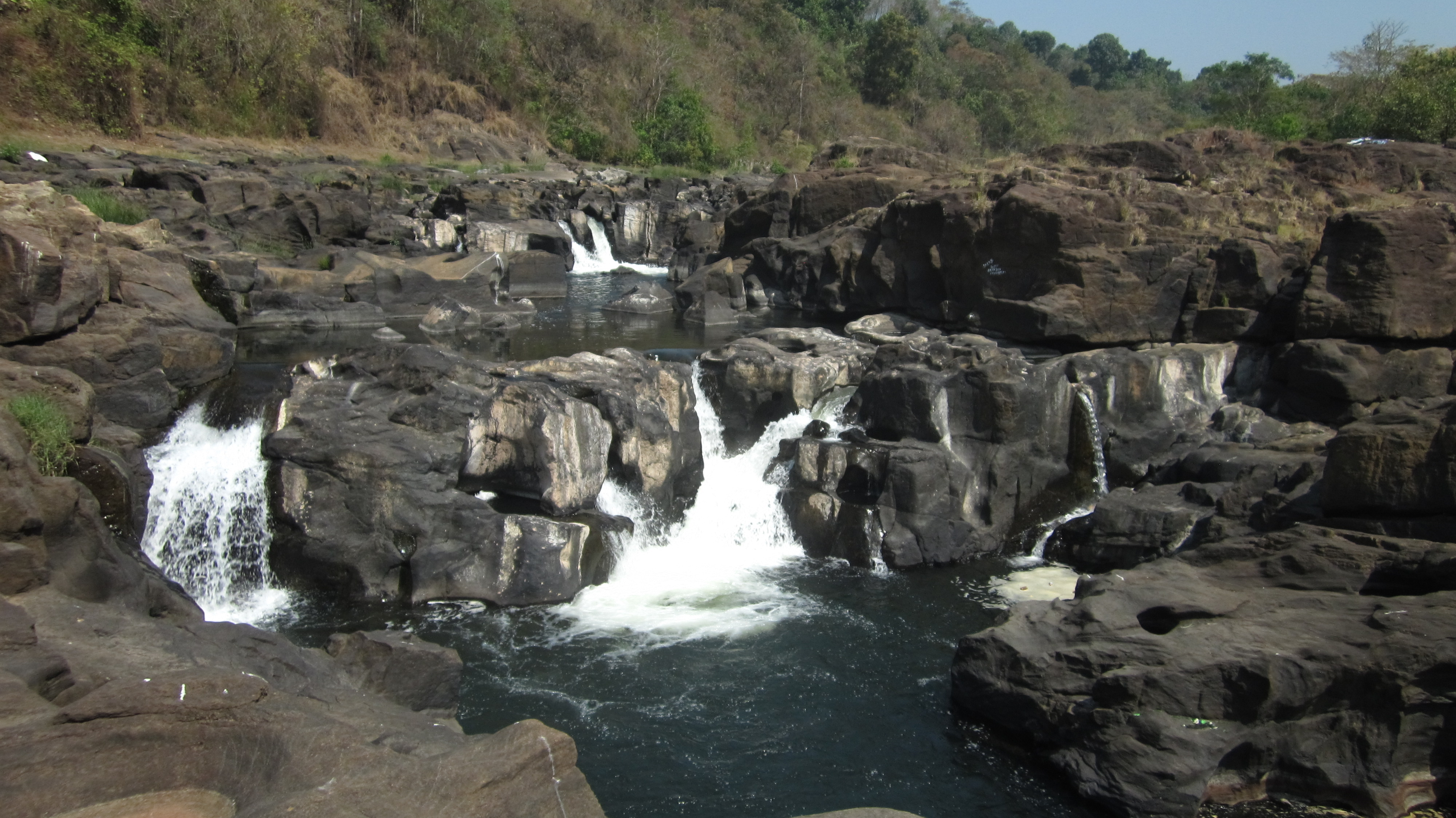
Perunthenaruvi Falls, Pathanamthitta

Pathanamthitta (IPA: [pɐt̪ːɐnɐn̪d̪iʈːɐ]), is a Municipal Town in southern Kerala, India, spread over an area of 23.5 km^{2} (9.1 sq mi). It is the administrative capital of Pathanamthitta district. The town has a population of 37,538 (as of 2011 census). The Hindu pilgrim centre Sabarimala is situated in the Pathanamthitta district; as the main transport hub to Sabarimala, the town is known as the 'Pilgrim Capital of Kerala'.

== Etymology ==
The district's name is a combination of two Malayalam words, pathanam and thitta, which together mean 'array of houses on the river side'. The district headquarters is located on the banks of the river Achankovil.

== History ==
The regions that form the town were formerly under the rule of Pandalam, which had connections with the Pandya kingdom. It is believed that Hindu God Lord Ayyappa was the King of this region. When Pandalam was added to the princely state of Travancore in 1820, the region came under Travancore administration.

Pathanamthitta district, along with most parts of Alappuzha district, was part of the Quilon district of the Travancore Kingdom until the formation of Pathanamthitta district in 1982.

Modern day Pathanamthitta District, the thirteenth revenue district of the State of Kerala was formed with effect from 1 November 1982, with headquarters at Pathanamthitta.

== Geography ==
Pathanamthitta has an average elevation of 18 metres (62 ft) above sea level.

The main trunk road from south to Sabarimala starts from MC Road at Adoor via NH 183A Pathanamthitta. From The North it Starts from Thiruvalla MC Road and Continues through State Highway 7 (Kerala), The Main Eastern Highway (Punalur-Muvattupuzha Road/SH-08), Main Central Road (Kesavadasapuram-Angamaly Road/SH-01), NH 183A Kollam -Teni via Adoor- Pathanamthitta.

== Climate ==
Pathanamthitta district

Climate chart (precipitation, max. and min. temperature)
J	F	M	A	M	J	J	A	S	O	N	D
16 32 22	236 33 23	76 33 24	167 33 25	125 32 25	595 30 24	232 29 23	563 29 23	297 30 23	196 30 23	93 30 23	88 31 23
- █ Average max. and min. temperatures in °C
- █ Precipitation totals in mm
Imperial conversion
J	F	M	A	M	J	J	A	S	O	N	D
0.6 89 72	9.3 91 73	3 91 75	6.6 91 77	4.9 89 76	23 85 74	9.1 85 74	22 85 74	12 86 74	7.7 86 74	3.7 87 74	3.4 88 73
- █ Average max. and min. temperatures in °F
- █ Precipitation totals in inches

Pathanamthitta has a tropical monsoon climate bordering a tropical rainforest climate, more or less the same as is prevalent elsewhere in Kerala. Annual temperatures range between 20 °C (68 °F) and 39 °C (102 °F). The district experiences three distinct weather conditions: winter, summer and the monsoon. The winter season is experienced from December to February and summer season from March to May. There are two rainy seasons: The South-West monsoon (June to September) and the North-East monsoon (October to November). The South-West monsoon is usually very heavy. About 75% of its annual rainfall is received during this season.

The town has a tropical climate. The monsoons start in June. The months of April–May can get significantly humid. The best weather is from October to February.
Pathanamthitta experiences three distinct seasons: summer, monsoon and winter. Typical summer months are from March to May. The warmest month in Pathanamthitta is April. Although summer doesn't end until May, the city often receives locally developed heavy thundershowers in May (although humidity remains high).

The monsoon lasts from June to August, with moderate rainfall. Most of the heavy rainfall in the city falls between June and July, and June is the wettest month of the year. The Last weeks of June is also days of floods. The three major rivers viz Pampa, Achankovil and Manimala swell with rainwater.

Winter begins in December. December through February are the winter months. The lowest temperatures are experienced during January.

A 2014 World Health Organization (WHO) study on ambient air quality among 123 Indian cities found that Pathanamthitta had the cleanest air in India, in terms of least concentration of dust particles in air. Two out of the three least polluted cities in India are from Kerala, Kollam being the second least polluted. As per the database, in Pathanamthitta, the annual mean of PM10 and PM2.5 is recorded at 23 and 10 respectively, which is closer to the recommended level of concentration of particulate matter. While a number of Indian cities are among the world's most polluted, Pathanamthitta's air quality is comparable to some of the cleanest cities in North America, Europe and Australia.

Climate data for Pathanamthitta, Kerala
Month	Jan	Feb	Mar	Apr	May	Jun	Jul	Aug	Sep	Oct	Nov	Dec	Year
Mean daily maximum °C (°F)	31.0 (87.8)	31.8 (89.2)	32.9 (91.2)	33.0 (91.4)	32.5 (90.5)	30.5 (86.9)	29.8 (85.6)	29.9 (85.8)	30.4 (86.7)	30.3 (86.5)	30.0 (86.0)	30.4 (86.7)	31.0 (87.9)
Mean daily minimum °C (°F)	22.4 (72.3)	23.2 (73.8)	24.6 (76.3)	25.5 (77.9)	25.4 (77.7)	24.3 (75.7)	23.8 (74.8)	23.8 (74.8)	24.0 (75.2)	23.9 (75.0)	23.6 (74.5)	22.6 (72.7)	23.9 (75.1)
Average precipitation mm (inches)	20 (0.8)	36 (1.4)	66 (2.6)	160 (6.3)	264 (10.4)	476 (18.7)	446 (17.6)	306 (12.0)	241 (9.5)	318 (12.5)	214 (8.4)	57 (2.2)	2,604 (102.4)
Source: Climate-Data.org

== Economy ==
=== Agriculture ===
Agriculture is the main occupation of the people. About 75% people are dependent on this sector. Rubber is the most important crop, with its plantations covering over 478 square kilometres (185 sq mi). The hilly terrain coupled with high humidity makes the region suitable for rubber plantations. Paddy is the most important crop cultivated in the wet lands. Tapioca and pulses are the important dry land crops. Other major crops are coconut, banana, pepper and ginger. In certain areas cashew, pineapple, sugarcane, cocoa and other tree spices are cultivated. The land available for cultivation is less since sizeable area of the district is reserve forest.

Major Agricultural Products
Products	Area under cultivation (km^{2})	Production (tonne)
Rice	43.39	10784
Sugar Cane	1.23	601
Pepper	56.51	1328
Ginger	5.26	1358
Cardamom	6.64	82
Cashewnut	11.41	686
Rubber	478.47	69094
Tapioca	79.91	226993
Coconut	217.39	380

- Source : Statistics for Planning-DES 2006

=== Fisheries ===
Pathanamthitta district has a unique position in the inland fisheries map of Kerala state with its freshwater resources like rivers, reservoirs, streams, ponds, quarries and paddy fields. The fisheries activities in this region started with the establishment of a Fresh Water Survey Station. The district has an Ornamental Fish Breeding resource centre and a National Fish Seed Farm. There are 2444 fishermen depending on this sector for their livelihood.

== Administration ==
Kerala Assembly Election 2016 Constituency map of Pathanamthitta

Pathanamthitta assembly constituency was part of the Idukki (Lok Sabha constituency) but now Pathanamthitta is a separate Lok Sabha constituency. Pathanamthitta comes under Aranmula Assembly constituency. Earlier, Pathanamthitta itself was an Assembly constituency. But after delimitation, Pathanamthitta lost its named constituency.

The district headquarters is at Pathanamthitta town. The district administration is headed by the District Collector Prem Krishnan. He is assisted by five Deputy Collectors holding charges of general matters, revenue recovery, land acquisition, land reforms and election. Under the three tier system of panchayat in rural areas, Pathanamthitta has one district panchayat, 9 block panchayat and 57 grama panchayats. Under the single tier system in urban areas, there are 4 municipalities the district. In addition, there is a census town (Kozhencherry).

As per the Delimitation of Parliamentary and Assembly Constituencies Order, 2008, Pathanamthitta has five Assembly constituencies, down from eight. However, the district was unified into a single Parliamentary constituency, thus contributing a seat to the Lok Sabha. The Pathanamthitta parliamentary constituency is formed by including all the five Assembly constituencies of the district along with two other Assembly constituencies in the neighboring Kottayam district.

Indian National Congress, the CPM/CPI, Bharathiya Janatha party(BJP)and Kerala Congress are the main political parties.

== Municipality Members ==
Pathanamthitta Municipality Election 2025 Results
Ward	Ward Name	Councilor Name	Alliance
001	Mundukottackal	Saji K. Simon	INC/UDF
002	Kairaleepuram	V. R. Johnson	CPI(M)/LDF
003	Kulasekharapathy	Ansar Muhammed	INC/UDF
004	Arabic College	Shainy Ashraf	CPI(M)/LDF
005	Kumbazha North	Aravindakshan Nair	INC/UDF
006	Myladupara Thazhom	Bijimol Mathew	KC(M)/LDF
007	Myladupara	Akhil Madathileth	BJP/NDA
008	Plaveli	Joji Samuel	CPI(M)/LDF
009	Kumbazha East	Ambika Venu	INC/UDF
010	Kumbazha South	M. N. Vijayaraj	CPI(M)/LDF
011	Kumbazha West	Nejim Rajan	INC/UDF
012	Chuttippara East	Sagheer	IUML/UDF
013	Valamchuzhi	Adv. Geetha Suresh	INC/UDF
014	Kannankara	Misna Arif	INC/UDF
015	Town Square	Fathima S.	INC/UDF
016	Petta North	Bibin Baby	Others
017	Collectorate	C. K. Arjunan	INC/UDF
018	Kallarakkadavu	Adv. A. Suresh Kumar	INC/UDF
019	Azhoor West	Asha Mohanraj	INC/UDF
020	Azhoor	Manju V. G.	CPI/LDF
021	Kodumthara	Leo Akhil	INC/UDF
022	College Ward	Kochurani B.	Others
023	Karimpanakkuzhi	Abel Mathew	INC/UDF
024	Churulikode	Ajin Varghese	CPI(M)/LDF
025	North YMCA	Sobha K. Mathew	CPI(M)/LDF
026	Pattamkulam	Ammini Teacher	CPI(M)/LDF
027	Thycavu	Sindhu Anil	INC/UDF
028	Anchakkala	Anila Anil	CPI(M)/LDF
029	Poovanpara	Sajini Mohan	INC/UDF
030	Vettippuram	Sherina Rahim	Others
031	Vanchipoika	Ansil Ahammed	CPI(M)/LDF
032	Peringamala	P. K. Aneesh	CPI(M)/LDF
033	Saradamadom	Joyamma Simon	INC/UDF

== Transportation ==
=== Airport ===
The proposed Sabari International Airport, Cheruvally would be the closest airport upon completion, at 28 km away from Pathanamthitta town.

Thiruvananthapuram International Airport (113 km), Cochin International Airport, at Nedumbassery, Kochi (142 km) are the nearest airports.

=== Heliport ===
Perunad Heliport (helipad) is situated in Kuttikayam estate, Mampara road. Which is known as Sabarimala helipad. Chipsan Aviation Pvt Ltd, having service from various location. Most of the Sabarimala pilgrimages are using this heliport.

=== Railway ===
Chengannur railway station (station code: CNGR), located 24 km (15 mi) away, is the nearest railway station. Tiruvalla railway station (station code: TRVL), located 30 km (19 mi) away, is the only railway station in the district. Mavelikara railway station (station code: MVLK), located 32.5 km (20.2 mi) away, is also nearby after Chengannur and Tiruvalla.

=== Road ===
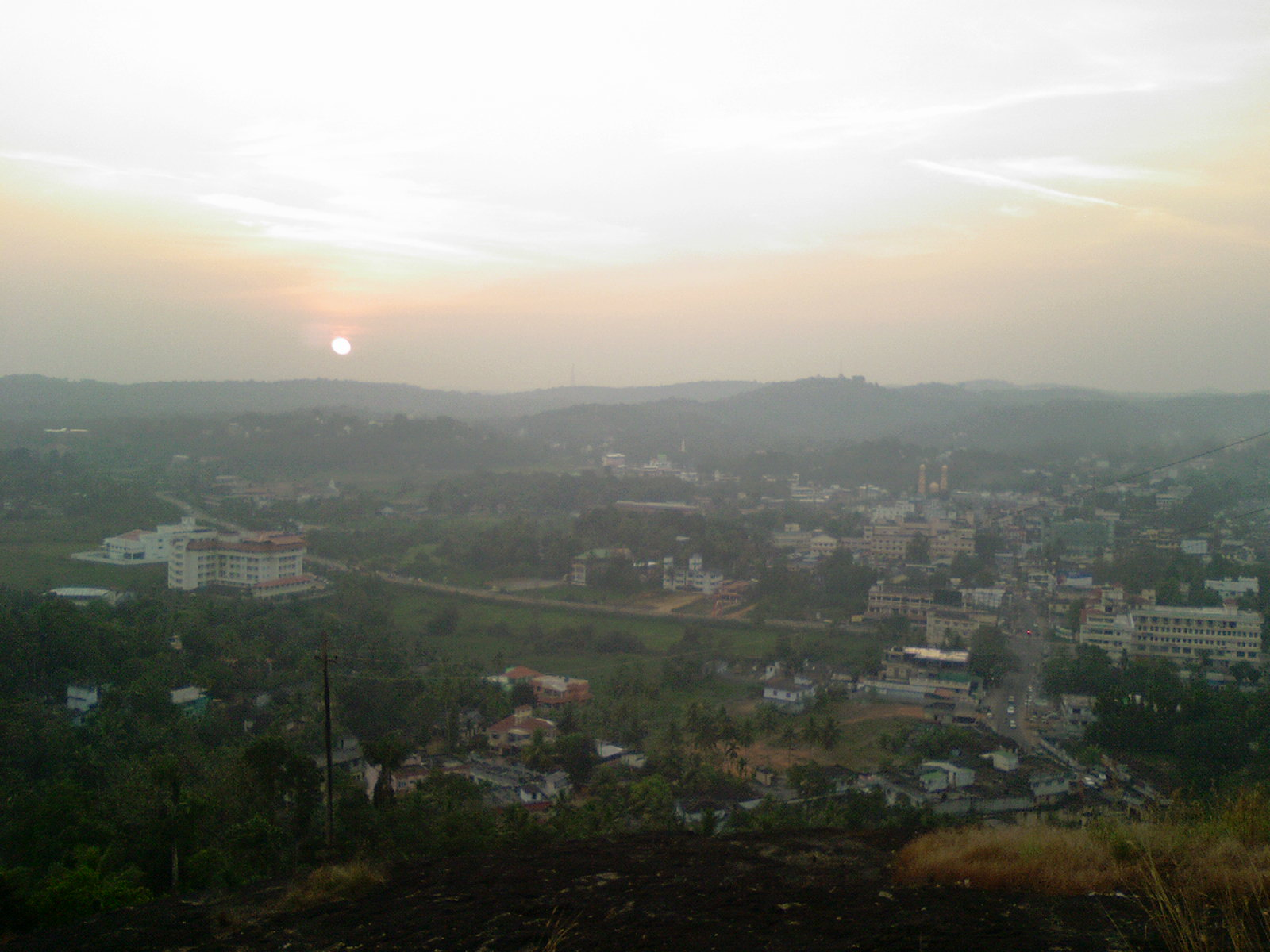
View of Pathanamthitta

Pathanamthitta is the meeting point of two major State Highways T.K. Road (SH – 07) and Main Eastern Highway (Punalur-Muvattupuzha Road / SH – 08). The town is well connected to major towns and cities inside and outside Kerala by the State run K.S.R.T.C and private buses.

== Tourism ==
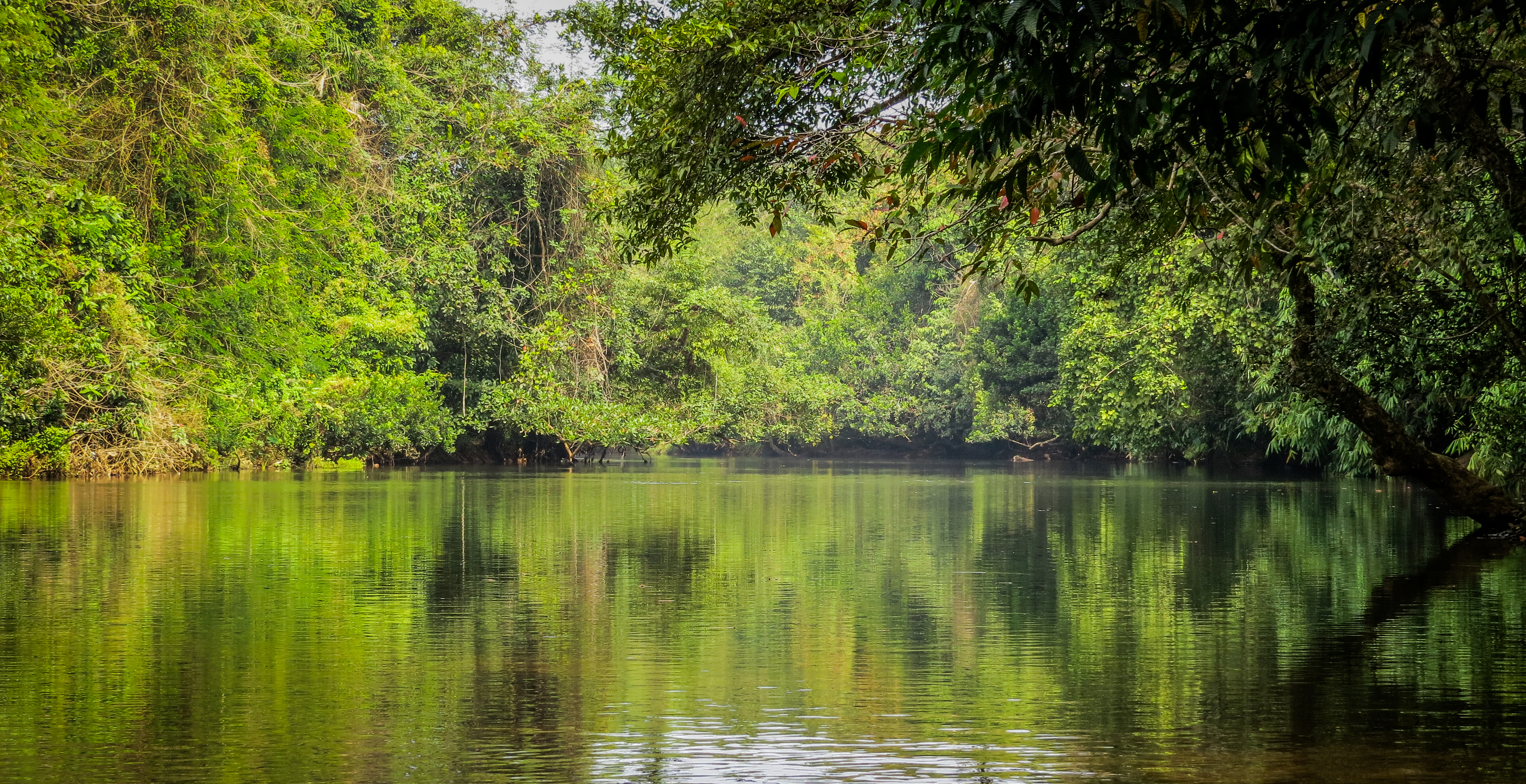
Lake tourism in Adavi

Pathanamthitta district is known as the Headquarters of Pilgrimage Tourism, of the Kerala State. Situated near the Western Ghats and bordered by the hills, Pathanamthitta district is a treat to eyes with its vast unending stretches of forests, rivers and rural landscapes. Blessed by nature, the district is famous for its scenic beauty, fairs and festivals. Land of Lord Ayyappa is the tag-line of Pathanamthitta tourism. Pathanamthitta attracts a large number of tourists every year. Pilgrim centres and other eco tourism spots like Gavi and Adavi are most visited in Pathanamthitta.

== Culture zone ==
Places around Pathanamthitta city within a distance of 15 km include, Elanthoor, Ranny, Vadaserikara, Kozhencherry, Vechoochira, Kadammanitta, Vazhamuttom, Adoor, Pandalam, Manjinikara, Mathoor, Cheekanal, Omallur, Malayalappuzha, Kodumthara, Elavumthitta-Muloor Smarakam, Kodumon, Kalanjoor, Ayroor Cherukolpuzha, Ulanadu, Kaipattoor, Mylapra, Uthimoodu, Thumpamon, Maroor, Pramadom, Konni, Chengara and Valamchuzhy. The places beyond these are Thiruvalla, Nilackal, Parumala, and Maramon. Pathanamthitta lies on the road route to the pilgrim town of Sabarimala, which is 65 km away. The Chettikulangara temple, at Mavelikkara is about 35 km from Pathanamthitta. Padanilam Parabrahma Temple is situated 26 km from Pathanamthitta. Aranmula is around 14 km from Pathanamthitta. Aranmula Temple is one of the biggest temples in South India en route to Sabarimala.

- Sabarimala Mandala Pooja.
- Maramon Convention was recorded in 2010 as one of the largest Christian gatherings in Asia. The annual conventions are held during the first half of February.
- Cherukolpuzha Hindu matha convention
- Aranmula annual boat race.
- Aranmula Kannadi – Centuries old art of mirror making from metal composites.
- Kumbanadu Convention is the largest Pentecostal peoples gathering at Kumbanadu.
- Mylapra Perunnal - The feast of St. George at Mylapra Valiyapally, on May 6 and May 7 attracts thousands of devotees from far and wide.

== Notable people from Pathanamthitta District ==
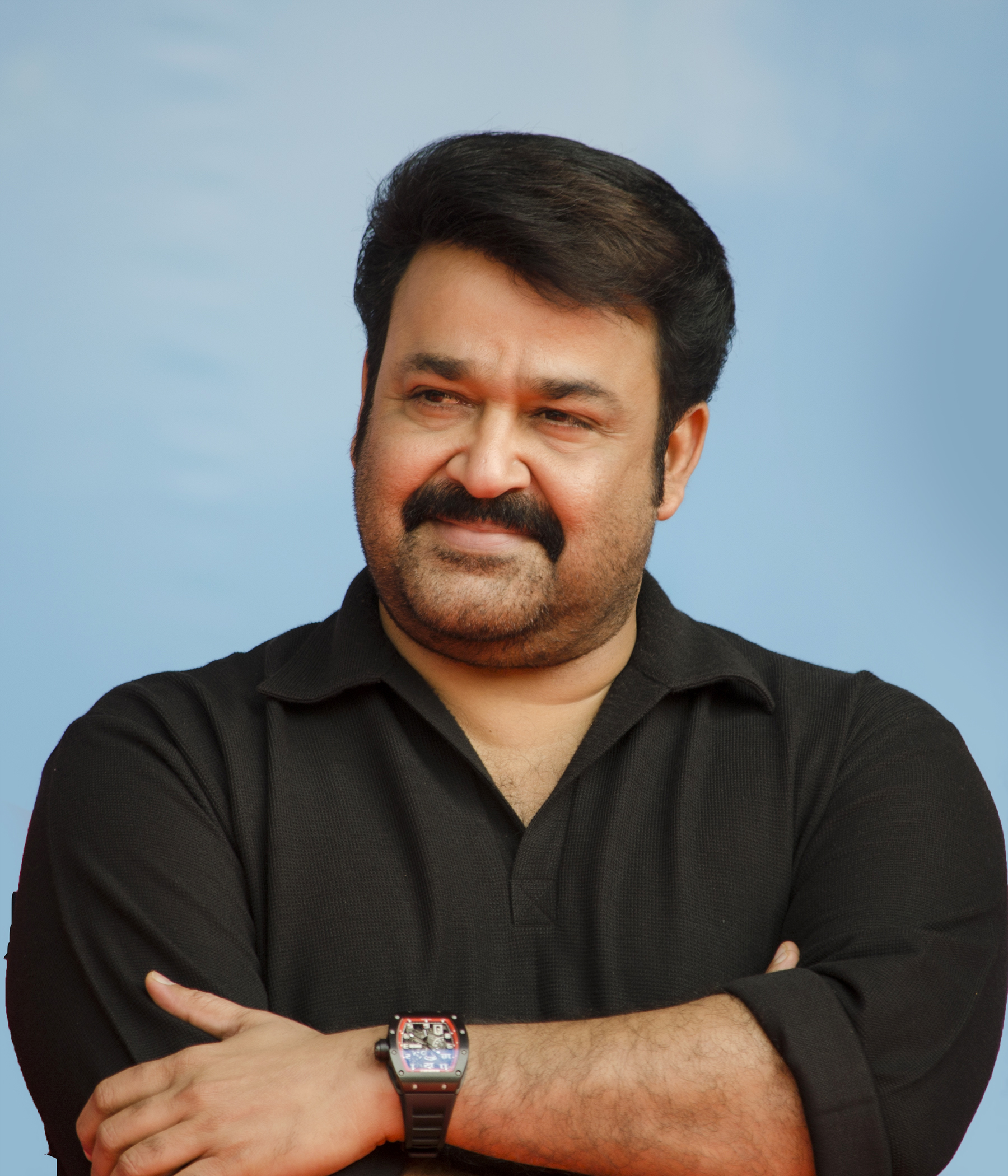
Indian film actor Mohanlal is from Elanthoor, Pathanamthitta.

See List of people from Pathanamthitta District

== Demographics ==
As per the 2011 Census of India, Pathanamthitta municipality has a population of 37,538, of which 17,744 are males and 19,794 are females. The population of children aged 0–6 is 3,400, which is 9.06% of the total population.

Pathanamthitta has a Human sex ratio of 1,116 against the state average of 1,084, and a child sex ratio of 973 against the Kerala average of 964. The literacy rate of the town is 96.40%, higher than the state average of 94.00%. Male literacy is 97.40% and female literacy is 95.52%.

Scheduled Castes constitute 8.77% and Scheduled Tribes 0.35% of the population. The municipality administers 9,813 houses.

== Religion ==
Religions in Pathanamthitta municipality
Religion	Percent
Hindus	45.13%
Christians	30.03%
Muslims	24.28%
Others	0.56%
Distribution of religions Source: 2011 Census.

Hinduism (45%) is the majority faith in Pathanamthitta municipality followed by Christianity (30%) and Islam (24%).

Pathanamthitta is a center of the Malankara Orthodox Syrian Church, with its largest diocese in members, Thumpamon Diocese being headquartered here at Saint Basil Aramana, Pathanamthitta with the diocesan co-cathedral at Makamkunnu Saint Stephen Orthodox Cathedral in Pathanamthitta Town, the other being Saint Mary Orthodox Cathedral in Thumpamon. In 1992, Thumpamon Orthodox Diocese covered 101 parishes with 12 chapels. The current diocesan bishop is Abraham Mar Seraphim a member of Saint George Orthodox Valiyapally, Thumpamon Eram.

=== Religious conventions ===
- The Cherukolpuzha Convention, in Pathanamthitta is an important religious convention of the Hindus. It is held at Cherukole on the sand banks of Pamba River, usually in February every year. It is organized by the Ayroor-Cherukolpuzha Hindumatha Maha Mandalam at Vidyadhiraja Nagar at Ayroor village.
- The Maramon Convention, one of the largest Christian convention in Asia, is held at Maramon, Pathanamthitta, Kerala, India annually during the month of February on the vast sand-bed of the Pampa River next to the Kozhencherry Bridge. It is organised by Malabar Mar Thoma Syrian Christian Evangelistic Association, commonly known as MTEA, the missionary wing of the Malankara Mar Thoma Syrian Church.
- Kumbanad Convention is the second largest Christian convention in Kerala and it is the general convention of India Pentecostal Church of God.It is held at the second last week of January annually at Hebronpuram, Kumbanad.
- Madhya Thiruvithamcore Syrian convention held every year during the three-day Lent in February. It was started in 1918 under the auspices of Thumpamon diocese and is held on the grounds of St Stephen's cathedral, Makamkunnu, Pathanamthitta. It was started when Thengumtharayil Geevarghese corepiscopa was the vicar of the church. It is the oldest and largest convention in the orthodox Syrian church.

=== Places of worship ===
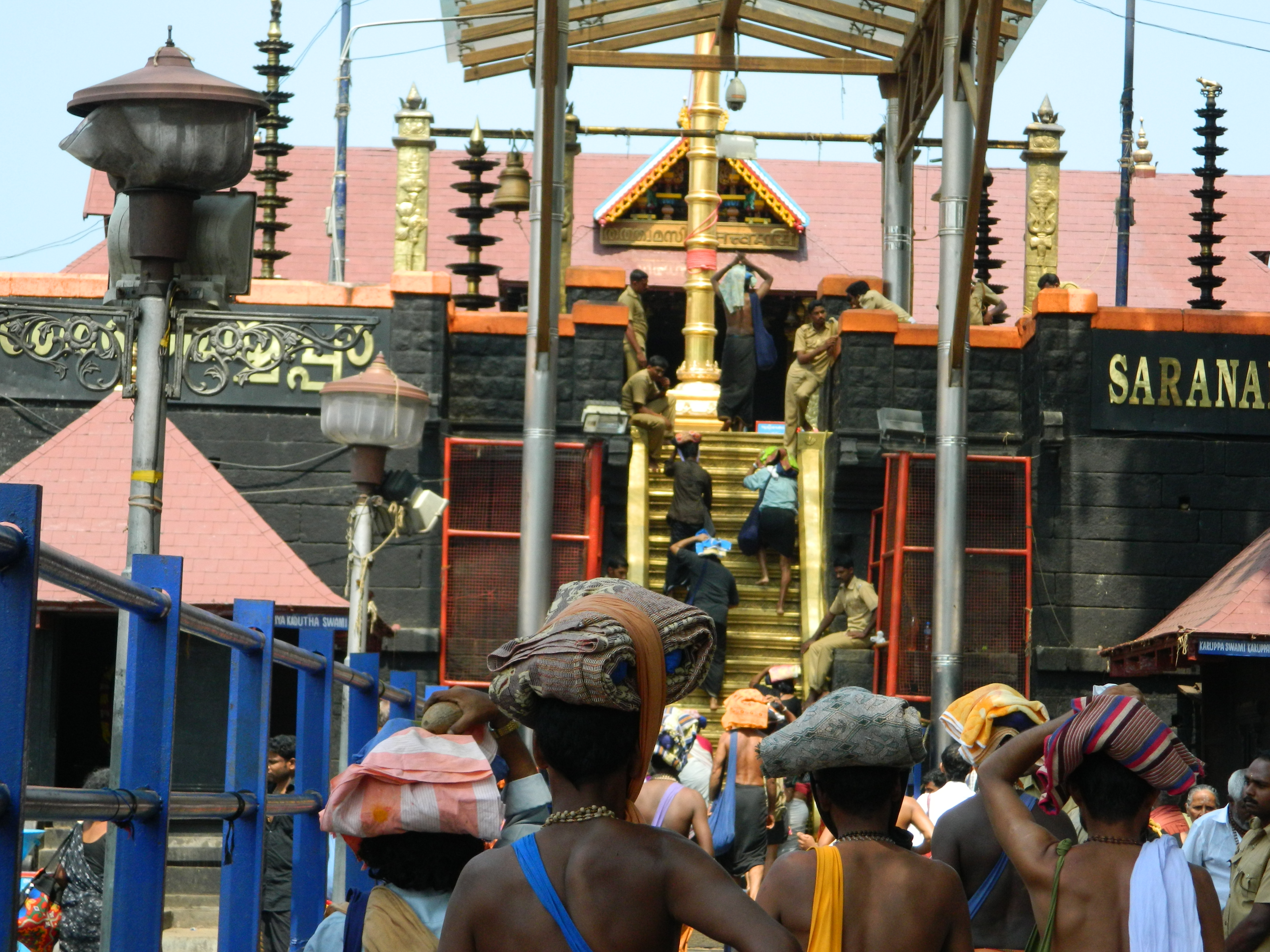
Sabarimala Temple

- The Sabarimala Sree Ayyappa Temple, a pilgrim centre in the Sabarimala hills in the Pathanamthitta district. It is known as the 'Pilgrim Capital of Kerala'.
- Aranmula Parthasarathy Temple is one of the Divya Desams, the 108 temples of Vishnu revered by 12 poet saints, or Alwars.
- Anikkattilammakshethram, Shivaparvathy temple
- Thrikalanjoor SreeMahadeva Temple
- Vaipur Mahadeva Temple
- Malayalappuzha Devi Temple in Malayalappuzha
- St.Peter's Malankara Syrian Catholic Cathedral, Pathanamthitta
- Assemblies of God in India, Thiruvalla
- India Pentecostal Church of God, Hebronpuram, Kumbanad
- St. Peter and St. Paul's Church, Parumala
- St. George Orthodox Church, Mylapra, also known as 'Mylapra Valiyapalli
- St Mary's Orthodox Church, Kallooppara
- St. Ignatius Monastery, Manjinikkara, Omalloor. Saint Elias III, the Patriarch of the Syriac Orthodox Church, arrived in Omalloor, Manjanikkara on February 12, 1932, but died the next day, February 13. The Manjanikkara Dayara attracts thousands of pilgrims every year.

== Flora and fauna ==
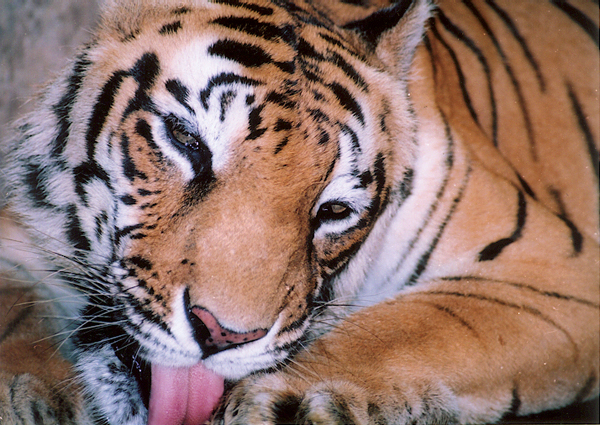
The tiger inhabits Pathanamthitta's reserve forests

Pathanamthitta has tropical biodiversity with forest, plantations, rivers and fertile land. Fifty percent of the district is covered with forest, providing rich flora and fauna. The district has a variety of plants including medicinal, spices, tuber crops and those yielding fruits and fiber. Aromatic plants and spices such as pepper, ginger, cardamom and turmeric are cultivated on a large scale. Trees such as timber, teak, rosewood, jack tree, manjakadambu, anjili, pala can be found in abundance.

The forests of the district have excellent wild life habitats. A variety of animals and birds can be found. Tigers, elephants, gaur, deer, monkeys and other wild animals are found in the forest. Giant squirrel, lion-tailed macaques, barking deer and bear can also be spotted in the reserve. Malabar grey hornbill and great Indian hornbill are found. Pathanamthitta also houses the Indian peacock. Wide variety of other birds such as sunbirds, woodpeckers and kingfishers can also be seen.

The existence of the wildlife habitat is under threat from various areas. Pollution from fertilizer and industries and illegal sand mining are the major threats. Issues connected to Sabarimala pilgrimage such as clearing of forest land and large amount of waste discharged also threatens the habitat.

== Sports ==
Main stadiums in the town are Pathanamthitta K. K. Nair Stadium and Pathanamthitta Indoor Stadium. Other stadiums include Pramadom Rajiv Gandhi Indoor Stadium. These stadiums host sports events in state, district levels and is also used for other purposes.

=== Cultural Sports ===
The Aranmula Boat Race is part of a festival celebrated during the month of September. Though the snake boat race is also performed at nearby places, the race held at Aranmula is unique because of the boats' shape and design. Maramadimatsaram (Ox Race) is another such seasonal sport. This is held as part of the largest annual cattle fair of Central Travancore region. The race is held in three categories.

== See also ==
- Kumbazha
- Kurisumuttom
- Malamekkara Mulluthara Devi Temple
