= Malayalappuzha Devi Temple =

Bhadrakali temple in Kerala, India

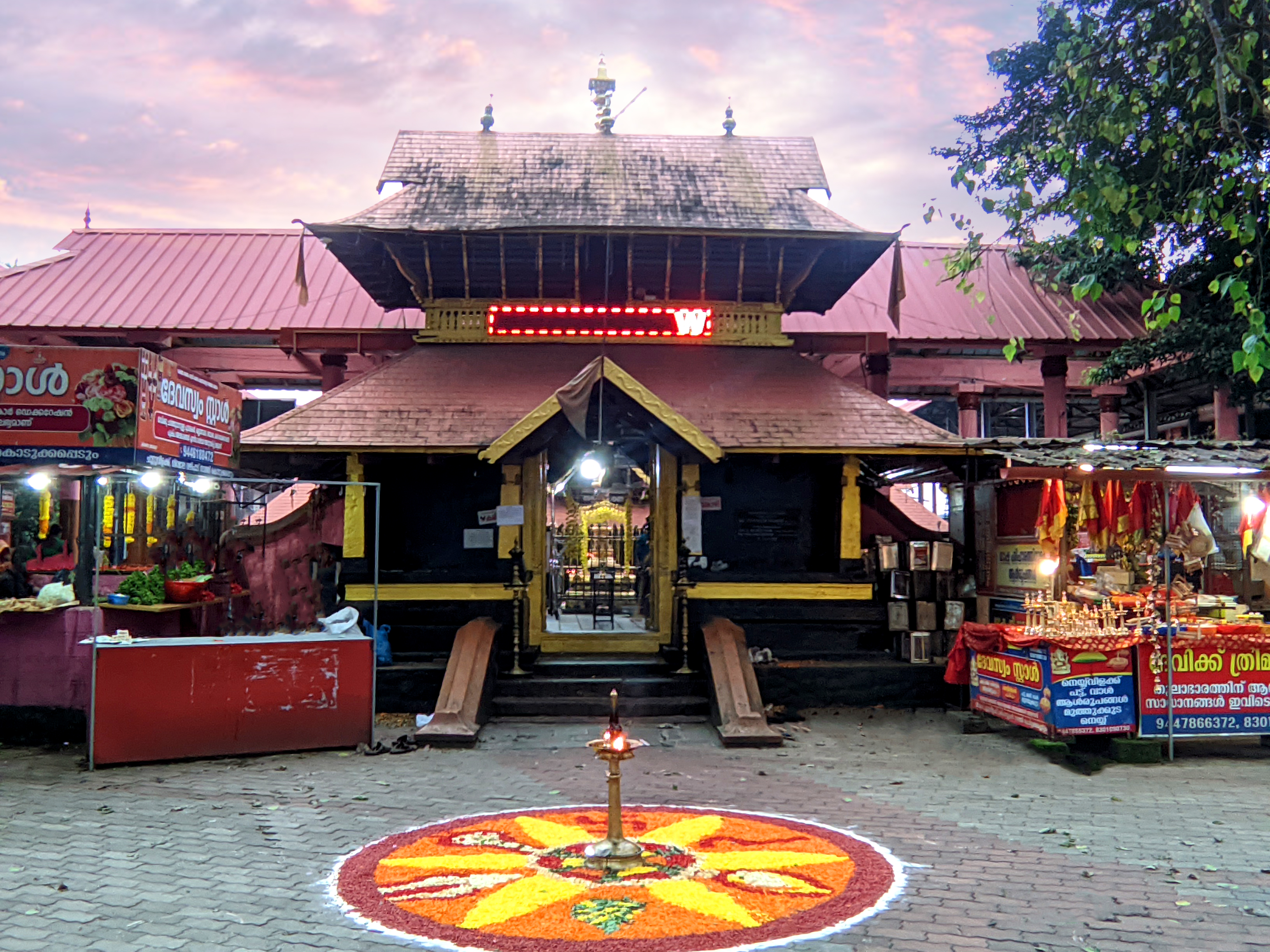
Malayalappuzha Devi Temple

Malayalappuzha Devi Temple is a Bhadrakali temple situated at Malayalappuzha in Pathanamthitta in Kerala, India. Nearest Railway station is Chengannur railway station It is believed that the temple was built more than 1000 years ago.

In the temple, Bhadrakali is seen in a ferocious form soon after the killing of the demon, Darika. The main idol is 5.5 feet high, made from katu sarkara yogam. In addition to this idol, two other idols are also erected inside the sanctum sanctorum; one used for abhisheka and the other for sreebali, a daily ritual.

== Worshiping ==
Malayalapuzha Devi is believed to grant boons for extending prosperity to all the devotees. The goddess is worshiped for protecting devotees from enemies, getting the unmarried girls married, obtaining jobs for the unemployed, and helping businesses flourish. This popular belief and faith makes the temple visited by devotees from far locations. The devi is also known as Goddess Idathattil Bhagwathi

== Legend ==
Once upon a time, two revered members of the Namboothiri caste from northern Travancore—belonging to the Aikireth Illam and Eravimangalath Illam —undertook a sacred pilgrimage to the holy shrine of Mookambika. With them, they carried an idol of Bhadrakali, to whom they devoted themselves in deep and prolonged meditation.

Moved by their unwavering devotion, Goddess Bhadrakali bestowed upon them a divine oracle, proclaiming that her perpetual presence would dwell within the idol they bore. Empowered by this divine revelation, the two Namboothiris resumed their pilgrimage, bearing the sacred idol with reverence.

As time passed and age wearied their bodies, the Goddess again manifested before them—this time to guide them to their final destination. She revealed that Malayalappuzha was the most auspicious land to enshrine her divine form. Obedient to her command, the Namboothiris journeyed to Malayalappuzha and consecrated the idol, establishing what would become a powerful and revered temple of Bhadrakali.

To this day, the descendants of the Aikireth Illam and Eravimangalath Illam faithfully perform the daily rituals and poojas, preserving the sacred legacy passed down through generations, and continuing to serve the divine.

== Features ==
Malayalapuzha Devi Temple features beautiful wall paintings and artistic stone carvings. The temple features a unique statue of Goddess Parvati feeding baby Ganapathy on her lap. An idol of Veera Bhadra can be seen on the entry to the sanctum. Sub deities in the temple are Brahma Rakshas, Nagaraja and a swayambu Shiva Linga.

== Festival ==
The annual festival is celebrated for 11 days. The festival starts on the Thiruvathira nakshtra in the Kumba masam (February – March). Kathakali is conducted on the fourth and fifth day.

== Visiting Hours ==
The temple is open for darshan from 5 AM to 1 PM and in the evening 5 PM to 8 PM.

== Contact Details ==
Malayalapuzha Devaswam Phone Number is +91 468 2300260

== How to Reach ==
Chengannur Railway Station, around 33 km, is the nearest major station for those coming in train. Trivandrum International Airport is the nearest air terminal around 107 km away.
