= Uthimoodu =

- Village
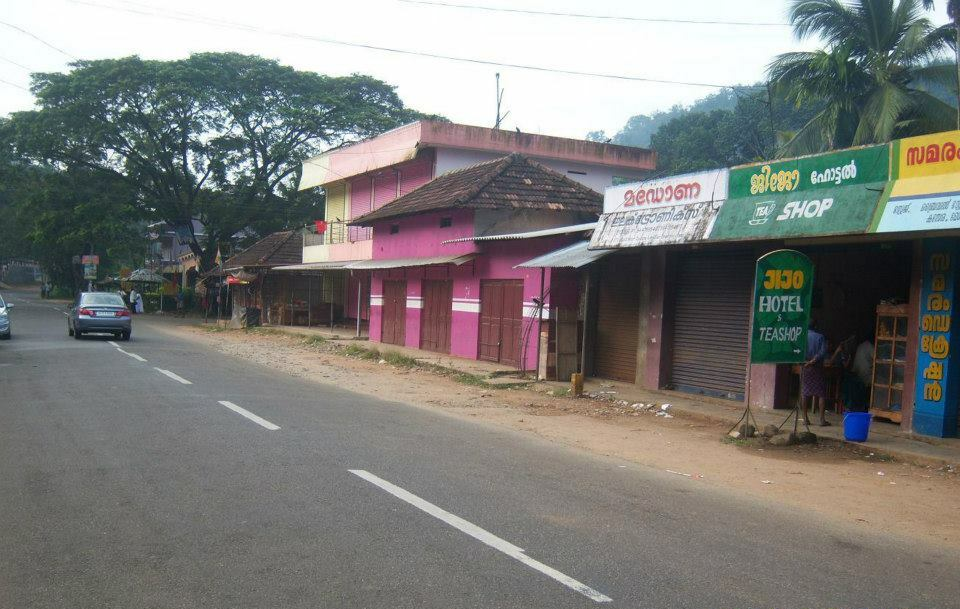
- Uthimoodu Junction

- Location in Kerala, India Uthimoodu (India)
- Coordinates: 9°20′15″N 76°49′40″E
- Country: India
- State: Kerala
- District: Pathanamthitta

Government
  - Type: Democratic
  - Body: Grama panchayath

Languages
  - Official: Malayalam, English
- Time zone: UTC+5:30 (IST)
- PIN: 689672
- Telephone code: 04735
- Vehicle registration: KL-03, KL-62
- Lok Sabha constituency: Pathanamthitta

Uthimoodu is a small village in Pathanamthitta district of the Indian state of Kerala.

"Uthimoodu" means "at the base of Uthi tree (Indian Ash Tree, Lannea coromandelica)". It is said that the current village center where the four roads crossing is located had an Indian Ash tree by which the name Uthimoodu name originated from. The area around the present Uthimoodu was dense forest before the establishment of current human settlements. Even though this was a forested area before current settlements, local stories narrated by older folks through word of mouth talk about few Adivasis who lived in this area who had specific local names for each mounts that constitute today's Uthimoodu village. Some of the original names that are used even today include Pothengal (resting location of water buffaloes), Irultankuzi mala (Rain flash water hole mount) etc. The story of Odiyan Manickyan in the movie Odiyan reflects the type of life and practices in this region before current settlement.

== Landmarks ==
Uthimoodu is the second largest business centre in Ranny Grama Panchayat. The main establishments in Uthimoodu are Uthimoodu Co-operative Society, Indian Overseas Bank, Krishibhavan, Milma, Cornerstone International School, Chamathackal MTUP School, Uthimoodu MTLP School and NMLP School Valiplackal, Federal Bank ATM, Akahaya Centre, Vetinery Sub Centre...

== Economy ==
The primary occupation is agriculture. Rubber is the major contributor to the agricultural sector. Other major crops are cocoa, coconut, tapioca and pepper. Remittances from non-resident Indians (NRIs) from Uthimoodu make important contributions to the economy.

== Demographics ==
Uthimoodu is a place of communal harmony. The majority of the people are Christians(majority being Marthomites) & Hindus (mostly belonging to the Ezhava community). However there are other Hindu Denominations such as Acharis, Saivavellalimars, Velakkathara Nairs, Pulayars, Kuravas, Tribals in good numbers besides Malankara Catholics, Orthodox, Pentecost, CSI denominations etc.

== Geography ==
The major places in Uthimoodu are Valiplackal, Valiakalunku, Dippo Padi, Nursery Padi, Velivayalpadi, Moozhiyar Junction, Kottamala, Karimkuttickal, Ottakallu, Erattakallu, Muruppel, Poykamon, Pandhalathu Mukku and Chamathackal.

== Transport ==
Uthimoodu is on the route from Ranni to Pathanamthitta about 7 km from Ranni, 8 km from Pathanamthitta and 10 km to Kozhenchery. The place is centroid of Pathanamthitta, Ranni and Kozhenchery. The nearest railway stations are Chengannur (27 km) and Thiruvalla (32 km). The nearest airports are Trivandrum (106 km) and Cochin (130 km). The newly proposed Sabari International Airport is just 23 km travel from Uthimoodu.

The world-famous Sabarimala Ayyappa Swami temple is only about 60 km from Uthimoodu Junction.

== Religion ==
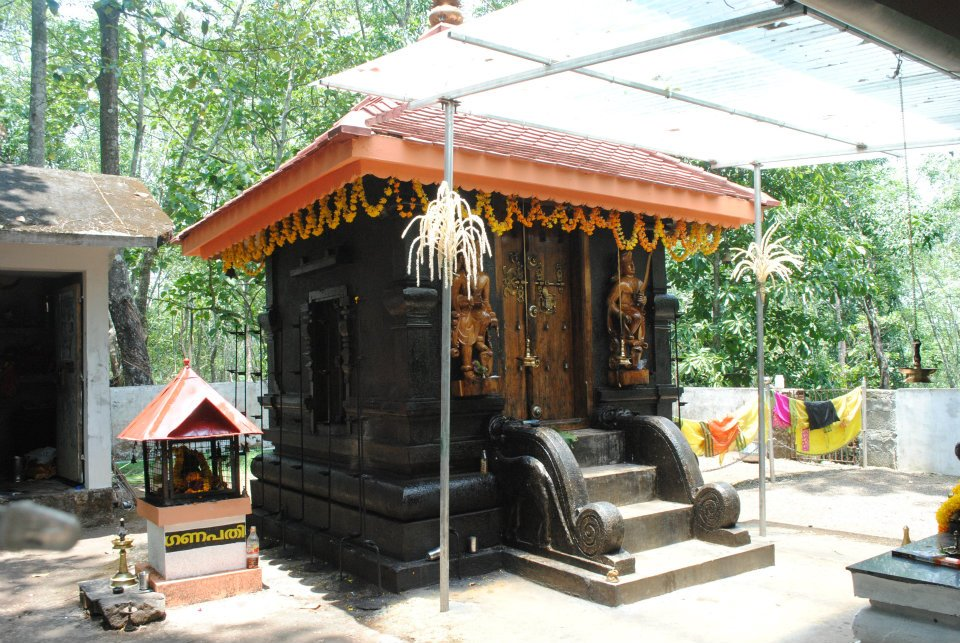
Kottamala Shiva temple

Uthimoodu Mar Thoma church is renowned for its annual Olivu Mala convention (Olive mount convention) also called the "Maramon Convention of the East" established by Christian evangelist, Sadhu Kochoonju Upadesi. The Marthoma church has Completed its over 100 years of existence, and coincides with the settlement of the families mentioned earlier in this article.

The Kottamala Shiva Temple, commonly known as Vambhukkara Shiva Temple is within 3 km built in the early 1990s. People used to do coconut breaking (nalikeryam udakkal) and lighting the lamp (vilakkukathikal), customs and rituals followed in Hindu beliefs. The temple was built in the late 1990s at a place where devotees saw a resemblance of Lord Shiva in banayan tree(ആൽമരം).

Other religious centers include the St. Mary's Malankara Catholic Church, the Pentecostal Mission Prayer Hall and a couple of SNDP Mandirams.
