= Kurisumuttom, Pathanamthitta =

Kurisumuttom
- Village
- Country: India
- State: Kerala
- District: Pathanamthitta

Languages
  - Official: Malayalam, English
- Time zone: UTC+5:30 (IST)
- Vehicle registration: KL-

Kurisumuttom is a village in the Pathanamthitta district of Kerala, India. It is between Thiruvalla and Ranny. The area is characterised by hills, valleys, and streams.
