= Pandalam Municipality =

Municipality in Kerala, India

Pandalam Municipality പന്തളം നഗരസഭ Panthalam Nagarasabha

Type
- Type: Unicameral house

History
- Founded: 2015
- New session started: 2025

Leadership
- Chairperson: M. R. Krishna Kumari, CPI(M)
- Deputy Chairperson: K Manikuttan, CPI

Structure
- Seats: 33
- Political groups: LDF: 14 seats UDF: 11 seats NDA: 9 seats

Website
- pandalammunicipality.lsgkerala.gov.in
- Location in Pandalam

The Municipality of Pandalam also known as Pandalam Municipality (PM) is the civic body that governs Pandalam, the world famous pilgrim town known as the live place of Lord Ayyappa and its connection with famous Sabarimala Temple. Pandalam is known as the pilgrim capital of Ayyappa devotees. In every year lakhs of Ayyappa devotees come here to visit Pandalam Ayyappa Temple & Pandalam Palace where Ayyappa lived. Famous Sabarimala Ayyappa Thiruvabharana Procession starts from here. Pandalam Town is situated in Pathanamthitta, Kerala. It is surrounded by other local bodies including Kulanada panchayath, Thumpamon panchayath, Pandalam Thekkekara panchayath (Thattayil) and Alappuzha district on one side. This is the first ever municipality in Southern Kerala where BJP got power from 2020 to 2025.

== Legislative ==
Pandalam Municipality formed in November 2015. As of 2017, the Pandalam Municipality's legislature, consists of 33 members.

In the 2015 Kerala local elections, CPIM-led Left Democratic Front (LDF) emerged as the largest alliance in the newly constituted municipality, winning 15 of the 33 seats. The INC-led United Democratic Front (UDF) secured 11 seats, while the NDA, led by the BJP, won 7 seats. The LDF subsequently formed the municipal administration.

In 2020 Kerala local elections, BJP won single majority by winning 18 out of 33 seats. The Left Democratic Front (LDF) won 9 seats, while the United Democratic Front (UDF) secured 5 seats. After formation of new local government in Municipality 2 independent councilors come and join support BJP. That leads BJP to a tally of 20 seats.

In the 2025 Kerala local elections, the Left Democratic Front (LDF) emerged as the largest political alliance in the municipality, winning 14 seats, followed by the United Democratic Front (UDF) with 11 seats and the National Democratic Alliance (NDA) with 9 seats falling to third position behind the LDF and UDF.

== See also ==
- Municipal governance in India
