= N. S. S. College, Pandalam =

College in Kerala, India

- Motto: Sreyohi Njanam Abhyasath (Sanskrit)
- Motto in English: "Knowledge indeed is superior to constant practice"
- Type: Government Aided College
- Established: 1950; 76 years ago
- Founder: Mannathu Padmanabha Pillai
- Academic affiliations: University of Kerala, UGC
- Principal: Dr. M. G. Sanal Kumar
- Location: Pandalam, Kerala, India; 9.2215°N 76.6814°E
- Website: www.nsscollegepandalam.ac.in

N. S. S. College, Pandalam is a higher education institution in Kerala, affiliated to the University of Kerala. It is one of the three oldest colleges established and managed by the Nair Service Society. The college was founded by Mannathu Padmanabha Pillai in 1950, with intermediate course offerings from the University of Travancore. The college is in Pandalam town near several other educational institutions under the same management.

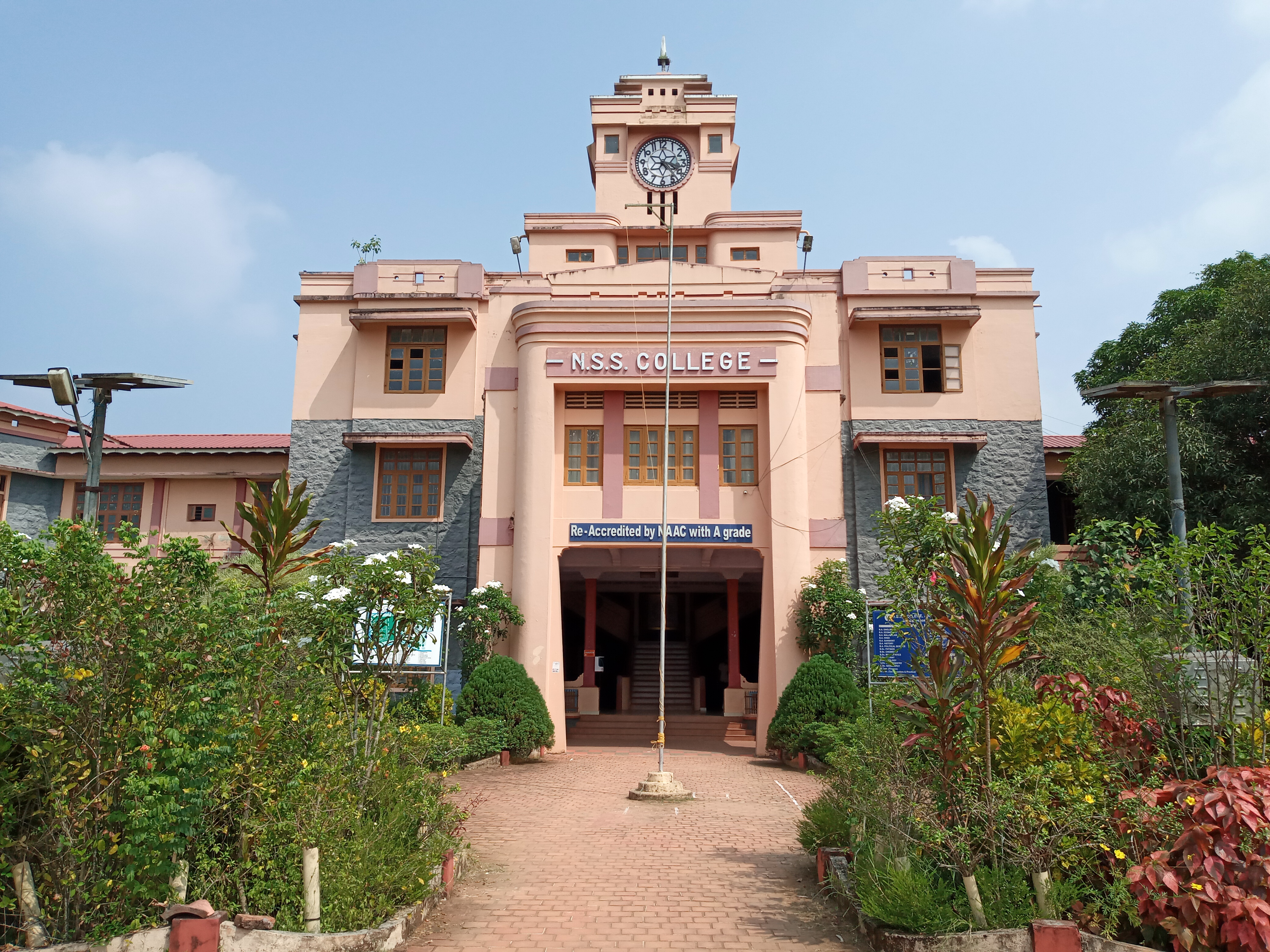
Main building of NSS College Pandalam

The college has 15 departments in science, arts, commerce, and physical education. It offers 14 under-graduate courses, seven post-graduate courses, and one doctoral programme. The college motto (inscribed on the college emblem) is derived from the Bhagavad Gita smriti Sreyohi Njanam Abhyasath (Knowledge indeed is superior to constant practice). The college is accredited as a special grade college by the University Grants Commission. It was accredited as B++ in 2007 and later re-accredited to A grade in 2014 by the National Assessment and Accreditation Council.

The college campus covers 50 acres (20 ha) of land, and houses a study centre of the University of Kerala and the University District Information Office. The Zoology department receives financial assistance from the Sir Ratan Tata Trust. The English department has a theatre called the Pandaleeyan English Theatre, which was formed by N. G. Kurup who was college principal in the 1960s. The theatre has staged William Shakespeare's Hamlet in Thiruvananthapuram and Ernakulam. In 2013, the department staged a Kathakali adaptation of Shakespeare's Othello at its literary fest "Lumina Literati".

The college library has approximately 50,000 books and 1800 reference books. It also has active units of the National Cadet Corps, the National Service Scheme, the Women's Studies Unit, the forestry club, Entrepreneurship Development Club and the Film Club. The college has hosted several national seminars and workshops on various topics such as cinema, Malayalam literature, and water resources management.

Notable alumni of the college include P. S. Sreedharan Pillai, Pandalam Sudhakaran, Adoor Gopalakrishnan, V. N. Rajasekharan Pillai and Narendra Prasad. Notable lecturers who worked here include Kadammanitta Vasudevan Pillai and Manoj Kuroor.

== Notable alumni ==
- Adoor Gopalakrishnan, director
- Dr. Biju, Director
- Narendra Prasad, Actor
- Pandalam Sudhakaran, Politician
- P. S. Sreedharan Pillai, Governor of Goa
- P. Prasad, Former Minister for Agriculture, Government of Kerala
- V. N. Rajasekharan Pillai

== Notable faculty ==
- Kadammanitta Vasudevan Pillai
- Manoj Kuroor
- Rajalakshmi, novelist, short story writer and poet

== Gallery ==
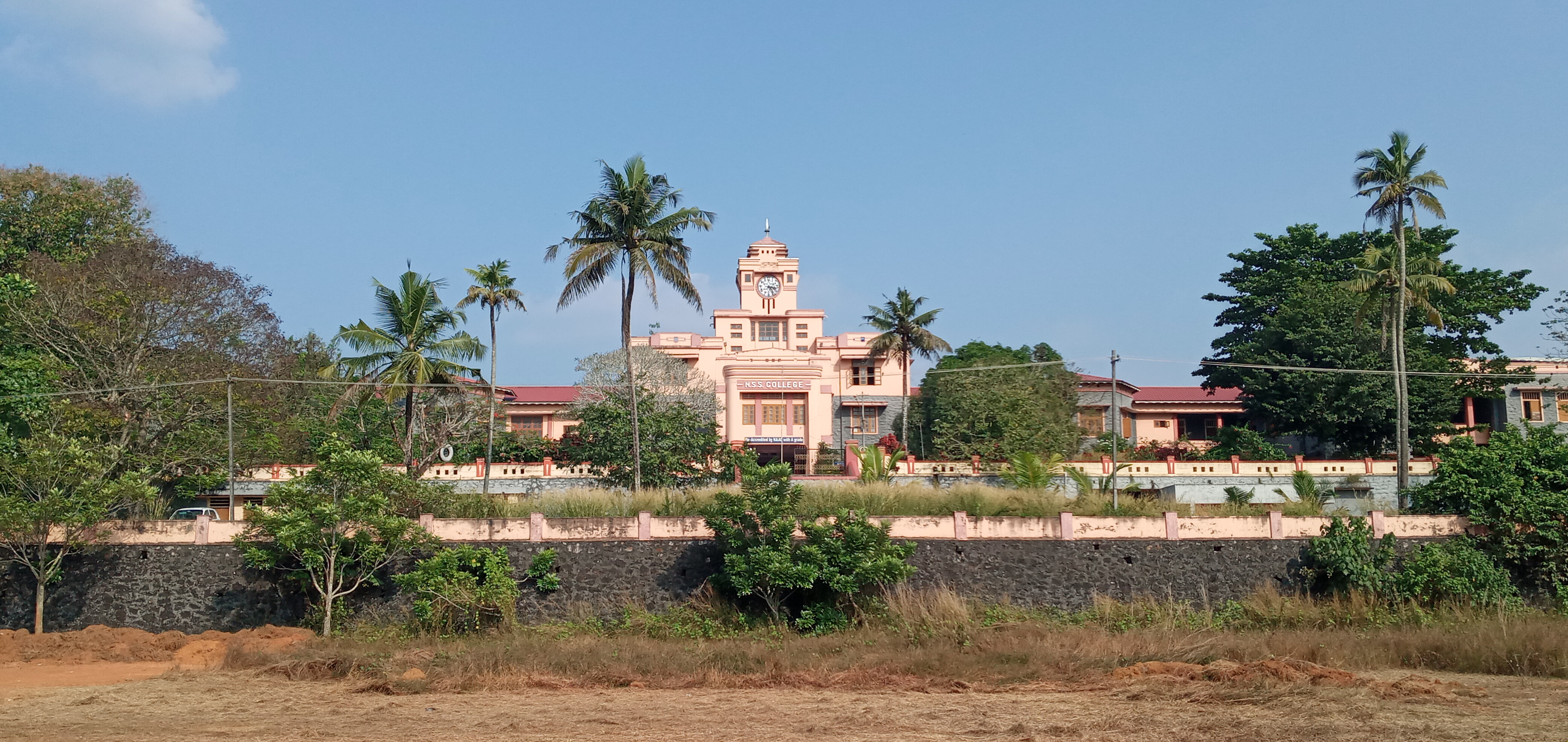
Front view of NSSCollege Pandalam

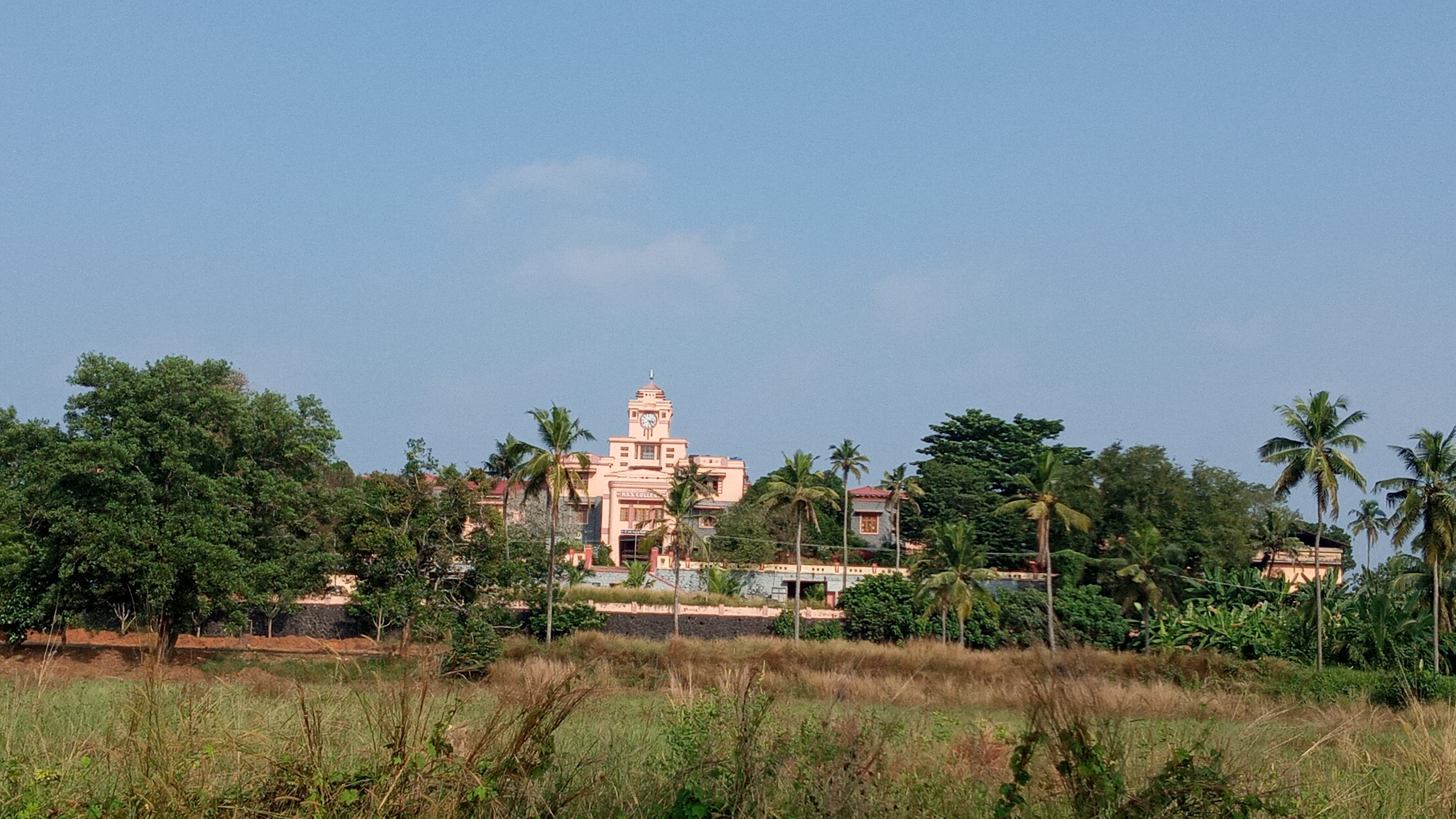
Distant view of NSSCollege Pandalam
