= Pandalam =

Pandalam Panthalam
- Municipality
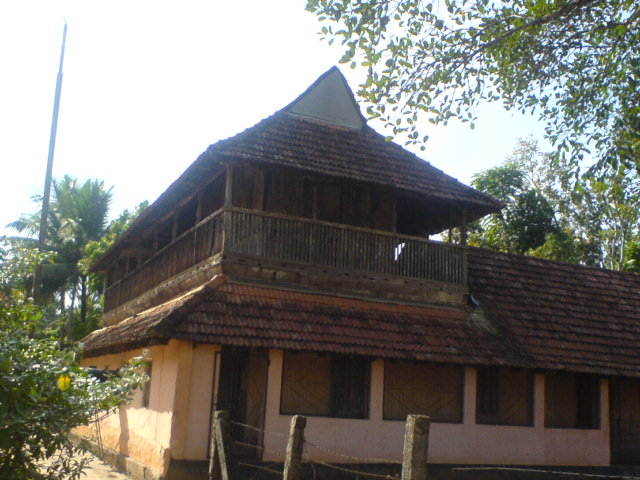
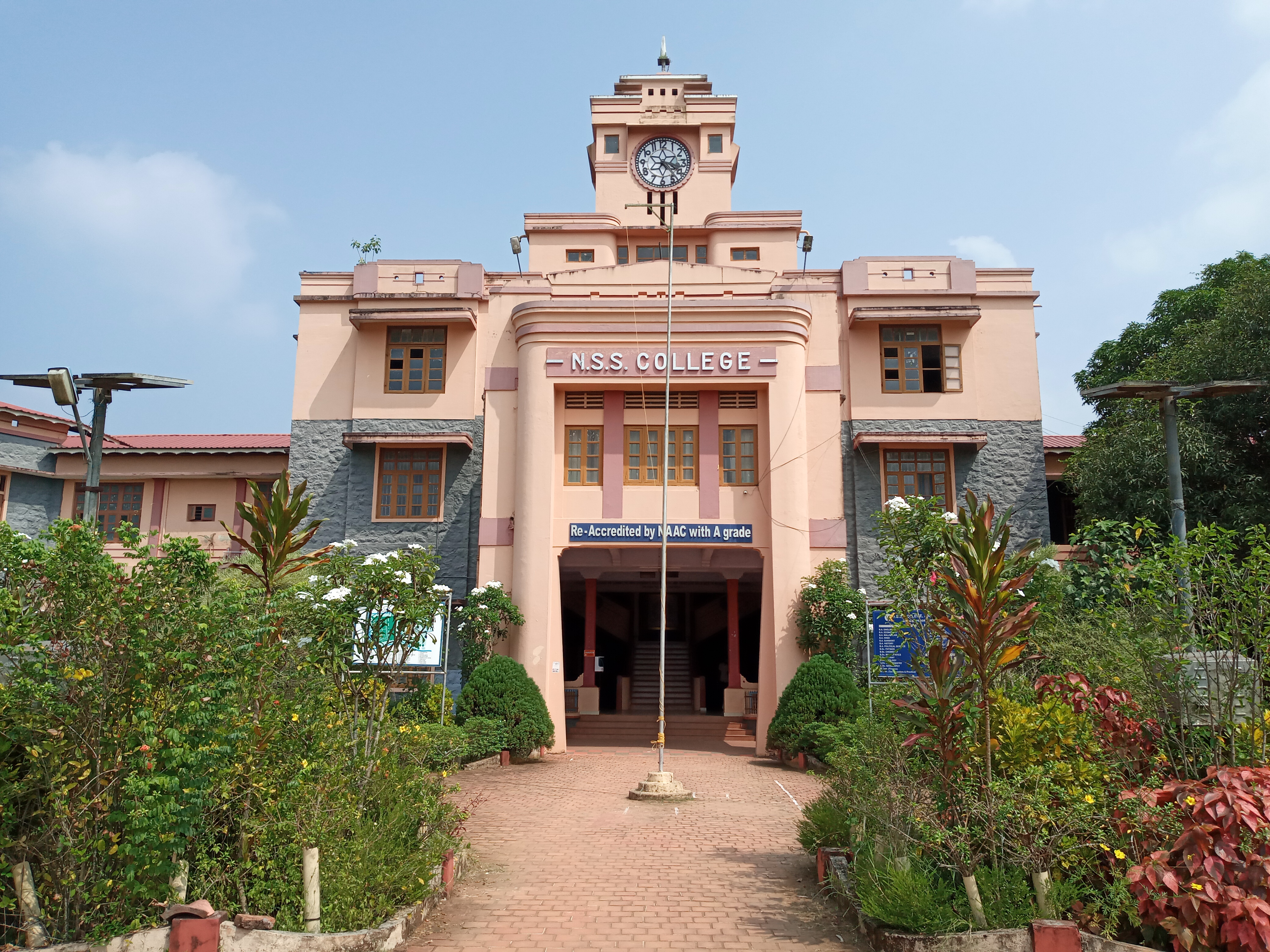
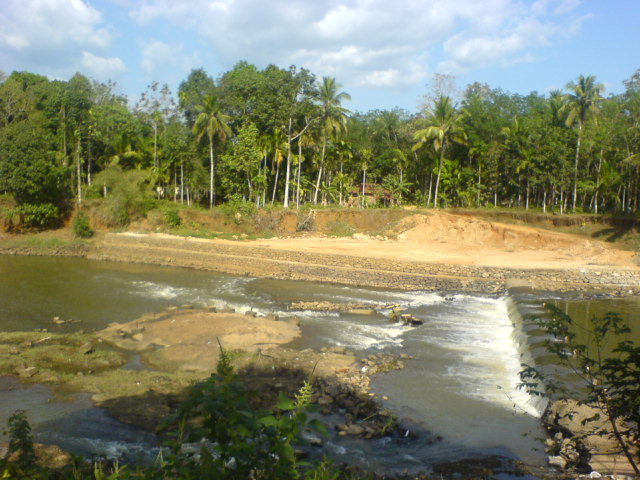
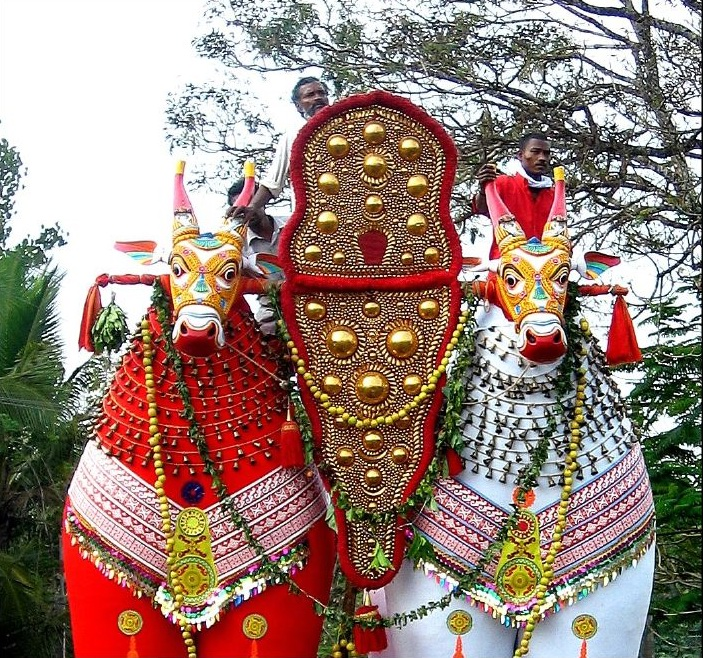
- from left to right: Pandalam Palace, NSS College Pandalam, Achankovil River and Kettukazhcha at Pandalam Mahadeva Temple
- Nickname: Kurunthottayam
- Location in Kerala, India Pandalam (India)
- Coordinates: 9.225°N 76.679°E
- Country: India
- State: Kerala
- District: Pathanamthitta District

Government
  - Type: Municipality
  - Municipal Chairman: Achankunju John (BJP)

Area
  - Total: 28.42 km^{2} (10.97 sq mi)

Population (2015)
  - Total: 42,793
  - Density: 1,506/km^{2} (3,900/sq mi)

Languages
  - Official: Malayalam, English
- Time zone: UTC+5:30 (IST)
- PIN: 689501
- Telephone code: +91
- Vehicle registration: KL 26
- Kerala Legislative Assembly constituency: Adoor
- Lok Sabha constituency: Pathanamthitta
- Official website: pandalammunicipality.lsgkerala.gov.in/en/

Pandalam is a municipality in Pathanamthitta district Kerala, India. Pandalam is known for its connection with Ayyappan and Sabarimala. Rightly recognised as the cultural capital of Central Travancore, Pandalam hosts educational institutions ranging from reputed schools to postgraduate training, Ayurveda, and engineering colleges. There are seven colleges and 23 schools at Pandalam, including N. S. S. College, Pandalam. The Kerala state government plans to make the place a special township, by including the Pandalam municipality and Kulanada panchayat.

The neighborhoods of Pandalam town include Thumpamon, Pandalam Thekkekara, Kulanada, Nooranad, Padanilam, and Venmony.

== Trade and Commerce ==
The centuries-old Kurunthottayam market (now known as the Pandalam market) was one among the largest agricultural markets in central Travancore.

Kerala's widest suspension bridge was constructed in Pandalam over the Achankovil river. The bridge is 70 metres long and 2.5 metres wide.

There are several devotional places at Pandalam. The most famous are Valiyakoikkal Temple, Mahadeva Temple, Puthenkavil Bhagavathi Temple, Pattupurakkavu Bhagavathi Temple, Thumpamon Vadakkumnatha Temple, Kadakkad Sree Bhadrakali Temple and the Thattayil Orippurathu Bhagavathi Temple.

Nooranad Padanilam Parabrahma Temple, which is renowned for its Maha Shivaratri Kettukazhcha is located 8 km southwest of Pandalam town.

== Legend ==
According to legend, Lord Ayyappan, the presiding deity of Sabarimala, had his human sojourn at Pandalam as the adopted son of the King of Pandalam. During Sabarimala pilgrimage season, devotees come to Pandalam in large numbers to worship the deity of Valiyakoikkal Temple near the Pandalam Palace. This temple is on the banks of the river Achenkovil. Three days prior to the Makaravilakku festival, the Thiruvabharanam (sacred ornaments) are taken in a procession from Pandalam to Sabarimala.

== History ==
It is believed that Pandya kings of Tamil Nadu fled to Pandalam in the face of an attack by the Cholas and settled there in the land they bought from Kaipuzha Thampan, a landlord. The Pandya dynasty had provinces on either side of the Western Ghats. The King of Pandalam helped Marthanda Varma to conquer the Kayamkulam province. In return for this help, Marthanda Varma did not attempt to attack and conquer Pandalam during the expansion of his kingdom. The princely state of Pandalam had extended up to Thodupuzha in the Idukki district once. Pandalam was added to Travancore in 1820. Before the formation of the Pathanamthitta district, Pandalam was in the Mavelikara taluk of Alappuzha district.

== Administration ==
Pandalam Municipality is the civic body that governs Pandalam. It is surrounded by other local bodies, including Kulanada panchayath, Thumpamon panchayath, Pandalam Thekkekara panchayath and Nooranad panchayat in Alappuzha district on one side. This is the first-ever municipality in Southern Kerala where BJP is in power.

== Colleges ==
- NSS College Pandalam
- Mannam Ayurveda Co-operative Medical College, Pandalam
- NSS Polytechnic College, Pandalam
- NSS Training College, Pandalam
- NSS Nursing College, Pandalam
- Govt. ITI Cherickal, Pandalam (Under SC department Govt. of Kerala) in Cherickal.

== Hospitals ==
- NSS Medical Mission Hospital
- CM Hospital
- Chitra Multi-Speciality Hospital
- Mannam Ayurveda Medical College Hospital
- Primary Health Centre Kadakkad, Pandalam

== Landmarks ==
=== Pandalam Bridge ===
Pandalam Bridge, popularly known as Kurunthottayam Bridge, is situated in Pandalam junction.

=== Pandalam Suspension Bridge ===
Pandalam Suspension Bridge is a pedestrian suspension bridge in Pandalam that connects Pandalam with Kulanada.

=== Pandalam Palace ===
Pandalam Palace, placed on the banks of the Achankovil river, was home to the royal family of Pandalam. The royal family of this palace enjoys a significant position in the history of Kerala. It is believed that they have descended from the Pandya kings of Madurai. Pandalam Palace carries not just historical importance but a considerable religious magnitude as well. According to legends, Lord Ayyappa was born to the King of Pandalam. There is a temple on the banks of the Achankovil River, which is dedicated to Lord Ayyappa. The sacred ornaments of Lord Ayyappa are carried from Pandalam Palace to Sabarimala as a grand procession three days before the makaravilakku festival

== Notable people ==
No	Name	Profession
1	Pandalam Kerala Varma	Poet
2	Dr Alexander Jacob IPS	DGP, Kerala Police (retd)
3	Benyamin	Novelist, Screenwriter
4	Dr. Biju	Film director
5	M. N. Govindan Nair	Former State Secretary of CPI, former State Cabinet Minister and MP
6	Dr. Jitheshji	Cartoonist
7	Joy Kulanada	Cartoonist
8	Kadammanitta Vasudevan Pillai	Padayani artist
9	Kudassanadu Kanakam	Cine artist
10	P. K. Manthri	Cartoonist
11	Pandalam Balan	Playback singer
12	Pandalam Sudhakaran	Former state cabinet minister
13	V. S. Valiathan	Artist
14	Pandalam K. P. Raman Pillai	Lyricist famous for writing the song "Akhilandamandalam"

== Gallery ==
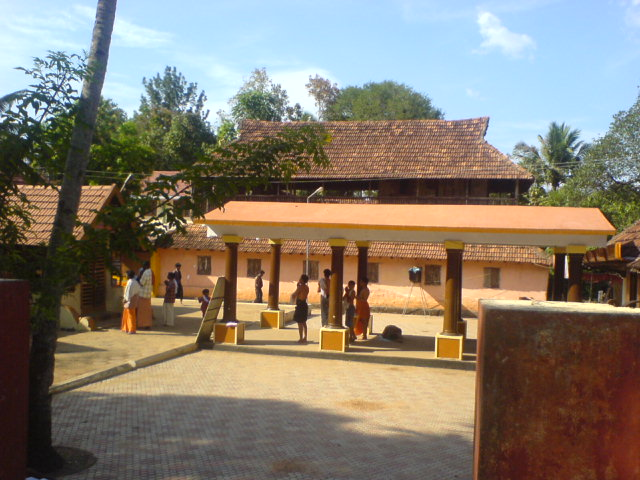
Valiyakoikkal Temple

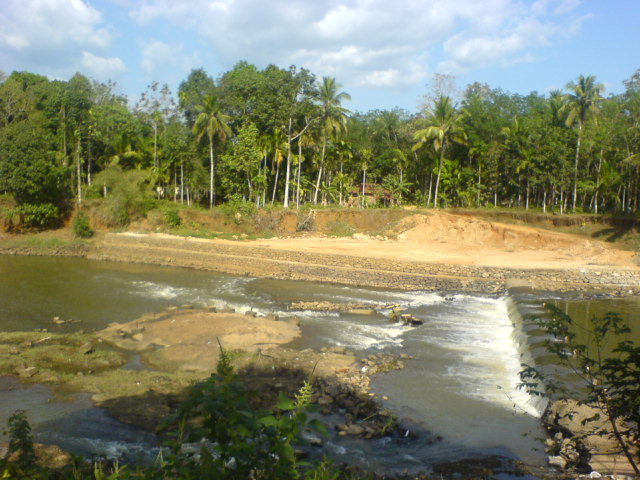
Achankovil river

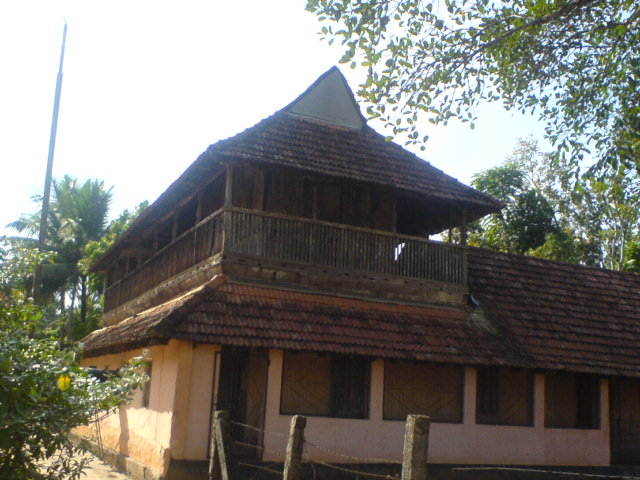
Pandalam Palace

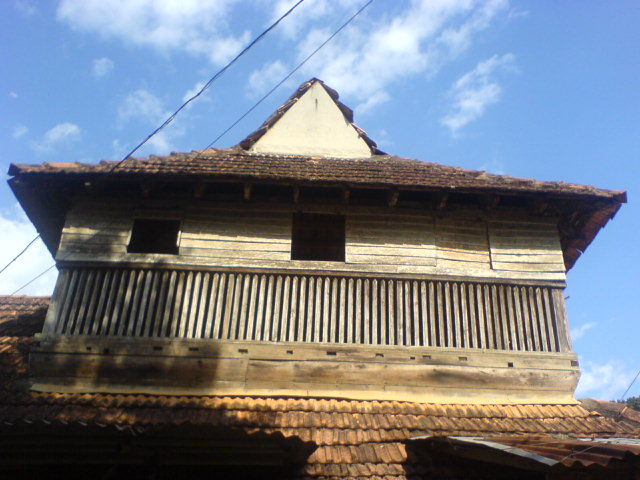
Pandalam Palace

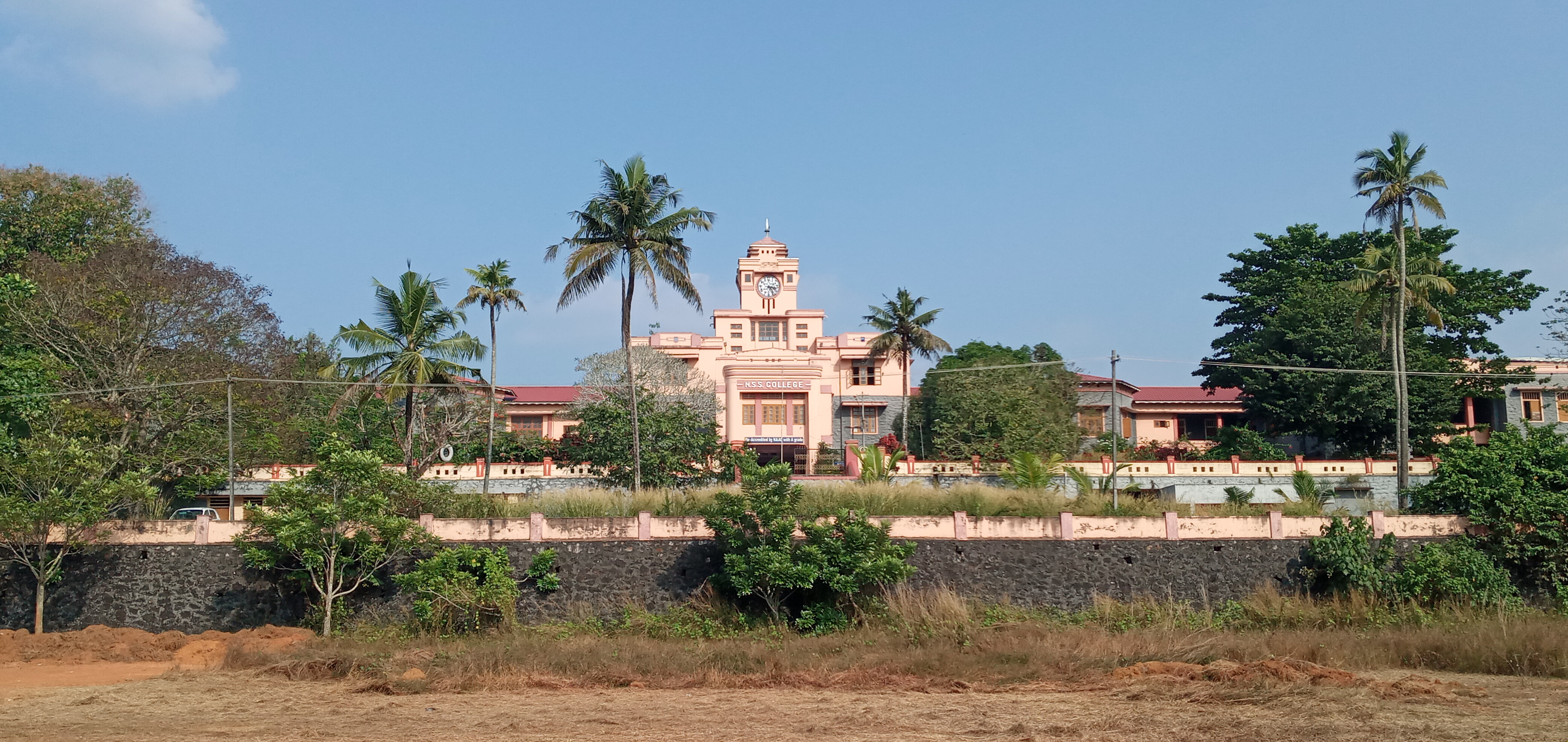
NSS College, Pandalam

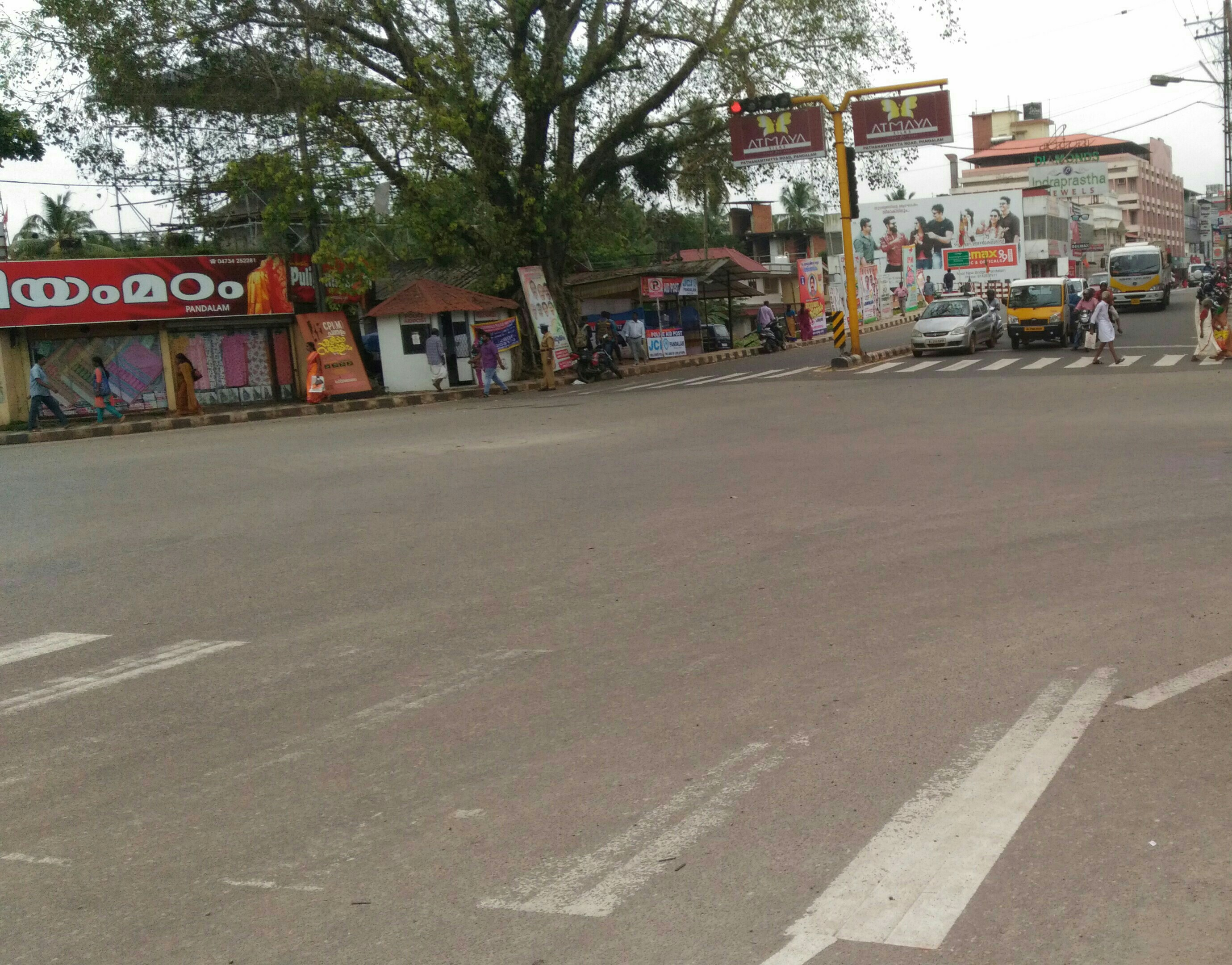
Pandalam Central Junction

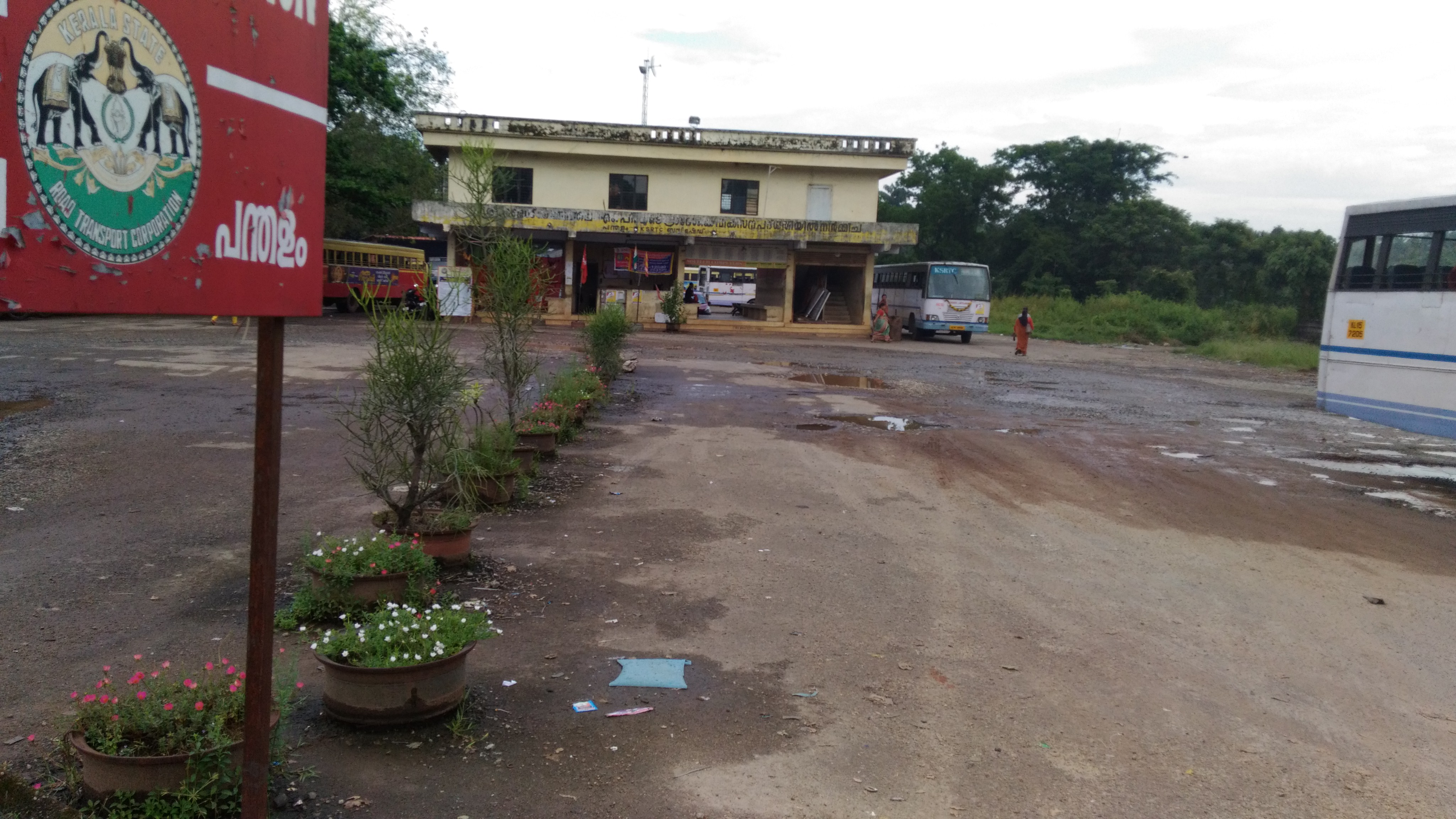
Pandalam KSRTC Bus Station

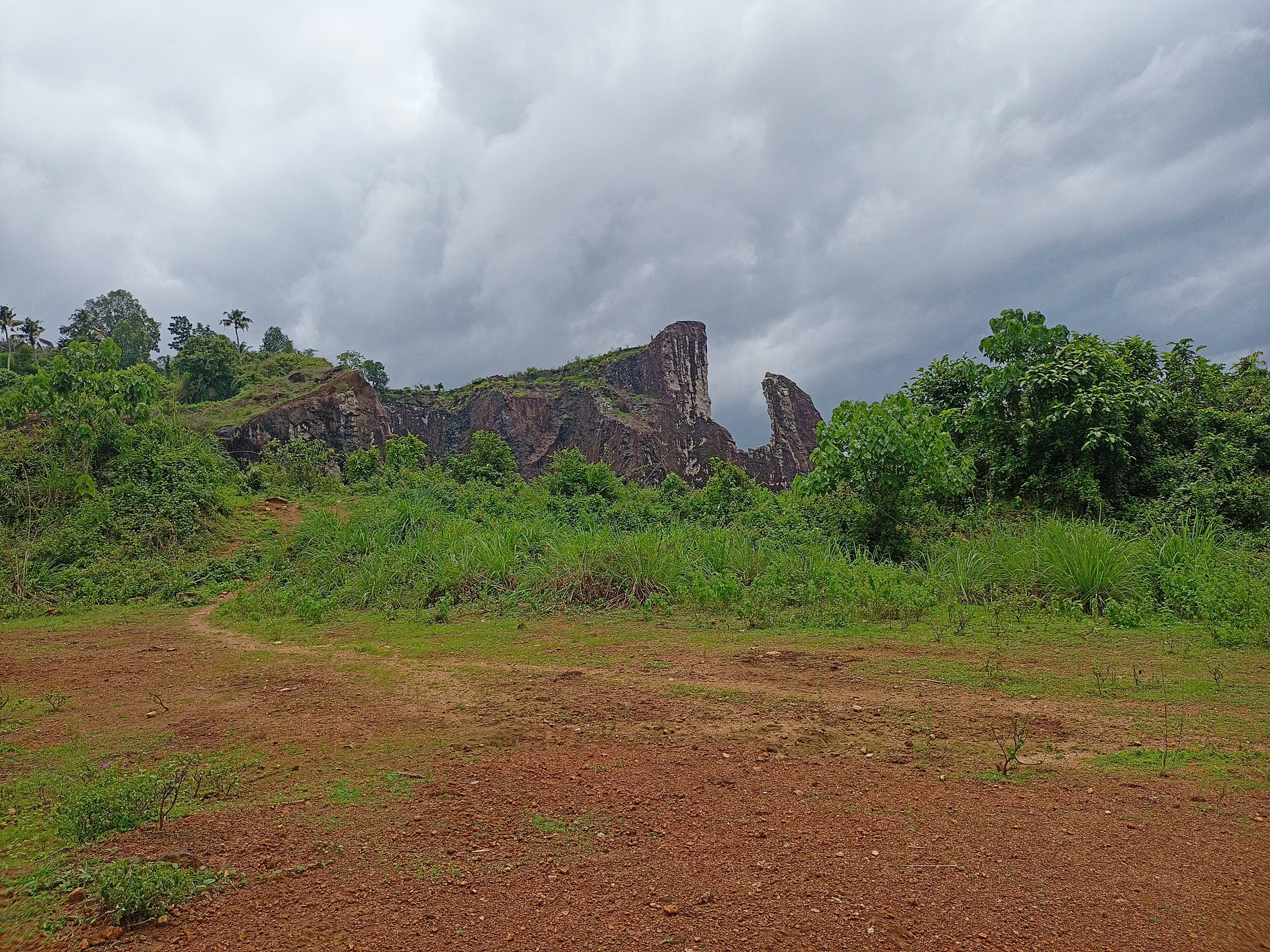
Mavarappara

== See also ==
- Kadakkad
- Thonnalloor
