= Thumpamon (disambiguation) =

Thumpamon may refer to:

- Thumpamon, a village in Pathanamthitta, India
- Thumpamon Vadakkumnatha Temple, a Shiva temple in Pathanamthitta, India
- Thumpamon Valiya Pally, an Orthodox church in Pathanamthitta, India
