= Thiruvabharanam =

Sacred ornaments of Ayyappan

Thiruvabharanam is the sacred ornaments of Ayyappan, the presiding deity of Sabarimala temple. The ornaments are made of gold. It is believed that these ornaments are made at the orders of the Pandalam King, who adopted Ayyappan as his child. Thiruvabharanam is kept at Srambickal Palace, which is close to the Valiyakoikkal Temple, inside the Pandalam Palace premises. At the end of the pilgrim season every year, the ornaments are taken to Sabarimala as a procession and poojas are performed on the idol adorned with the ornaments. After the season, the ornaments are taken back to the Srambickal Palace for safe custody. Thiruvabharanam and the caskets are made available for darshan at Srambickal palace during the pilgrim season (typically from 2nd week of November till the eve of the procession day) and at Valiyakoikkal Temple on the day of the procession.

== Caskets ==
Three caskets are used for carrying Thiruvabharanam, pooja utensils, and special flags to Sabarimala. They are the Thriuvabharana Petti (sacred ornaments casket), the Velli Petti (silver vessel casket), and the Kodi Petti (flag casket). These contain the following:

=== Thiruvabharana box ===
Golden face mask	Prabha Mandalam	Big coiled sword	Small coiled sword	Mini replica of elephant in gold
Mini replica of tiger in gold	Silver covered right hand spiral conch shell	Lakshmi Roopam	Ceremonial plate for carrying flowers	Navaratna ring
Sarapoli Mala (necklace)	Velakku Mala (necklace)	Mani Mala (necklace)	Erukkum Poomala (necklace)	Kanchambaram

=== Velli Petti ===
Pot for Kalasam	Pooja utensils

=== Kodi Petti ===
Elephant caparison	Arayan Jeevatha
Flags of Thalapparamala and Udamparamala	Mezhuvatta Kuda

== Procession ==
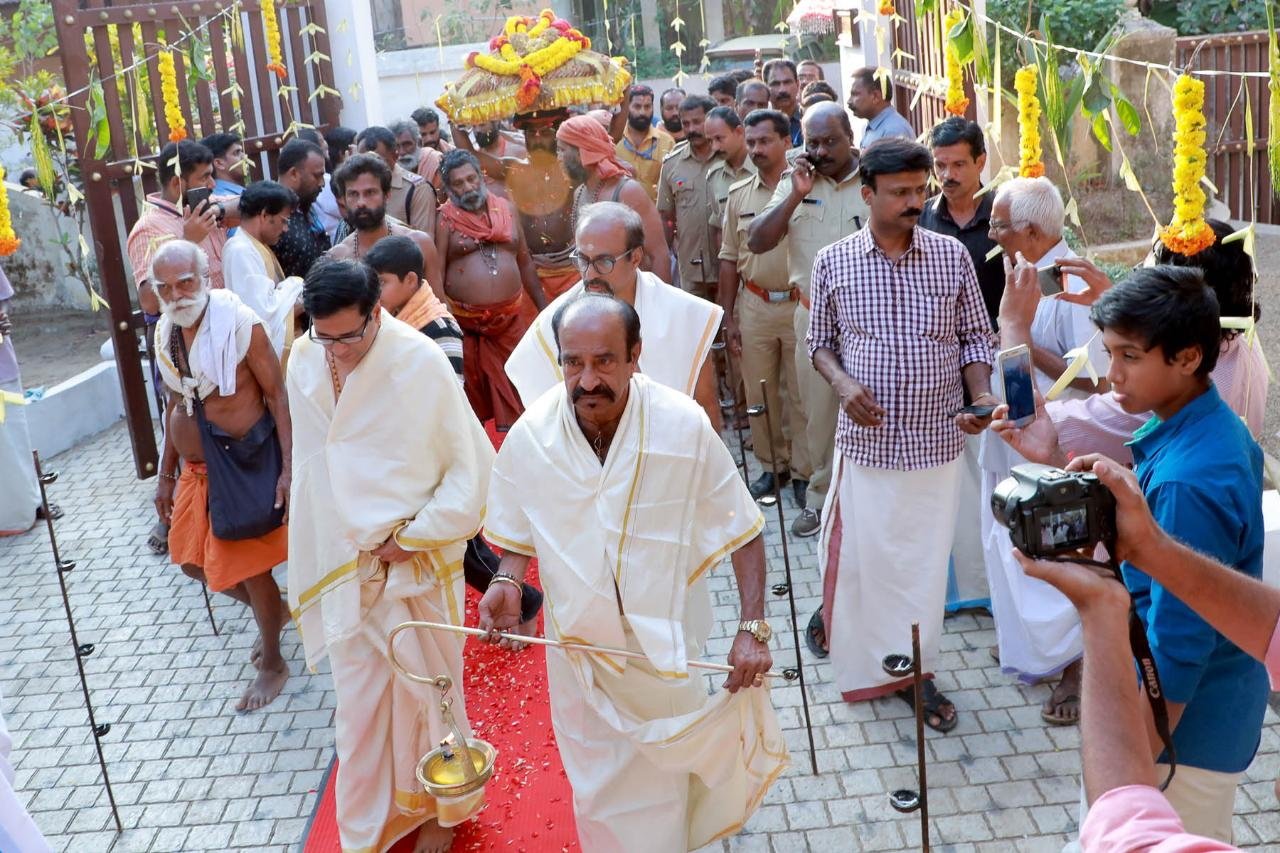
Thiruvabharanam procession

Towards the end of each pilgrim season, a procession carrying the holy caskets containing the sacred ornaments proceeds towards Sabarimala around 12 January every year. At around 1 in the afternoon on that day, a brahminy kite, popularly known as Sree Krishna Parunthu, is sighted circling above the temple and this is considered as an omen to start the procession. Devotees believe that the kite is Garuda accompanying the procession.

Traditional customs forbid the titular king of Pandalam to travel to Sabarimala. Instead, he nominates another person from the family to accompany the procession as his representative. The representative follows Thiruvabharanam procession on a palanquin. On the day of Makara Jyothi, Ayyappa's idol at the Sabarimala temple is adorned with Thiruvabharanam. After the pilgrim season, the return procession of the Thiruvabharanam starts from Sabarimala and reaches back Pandalam.

The Thiruvabharanam procession follows the traditional routes through forests, hills, and rivers. A team of representatives (not belonging to the Royal Family) takes the holy caskets on their heads and goes to Sabarimala by foot. The procession is accompanied by thousands of devotees and armed policemen. The procession is warmly welcomed by different associations and temples on the way to Sabarimala and back.

The Thiruvabharanam procession takes a traditional route to Sabarimala, covering a distance of 83 km by foot. One the first evening, the procession reaches Ayroor Puthiyakavu Devi temple via Kaipuzha, Kulanada, Ullannoor, Parayankara, Kuriyanipallay, Kooduvettickal, Kavumpady, Kidangannur, and Aranmula. On the second day evening it reaches Laha via Peroorchal, Keekozhoor, Aayickal, Pulickamoozhy, Kuthukallinpady, Mandiram, Edakkulam, Vadaserikkara, Madamon, Perunad, and Puthukkada. On the third and final day, the entourage reaches Sabarimala in the evening, via Plappally, Elavumkal, Nilackal, Attathode, Kollamoozhy, Vellachimala, Aettappetty, Oliyampuzha, Valiayanavattom, Cheriyanavattom, Neelimala, Appachimedu, and Saramkuthi.

During the return procession of the Thiruvabharanam from Sabarimala to Pandalam Palace, the journey begins at Perunad Shasta Temple and follows the traditional Thiruvabharanam route. It passes through Ayiroor Puthiyakavu Devi Temple and Cherukol Subrahmanya Temple before reaching the Pampadimon Ayyappa Temple in Kozhencherry. After a break for lunch and rest, the procession resumes in the evening and arrives at Mangattu Palace, located near the eastern temple of Aranmula. Members of the Mangattu Palace ceremonially receive the procession, and the team leading it places the sacred caskets inside the palace. The Thiruvabharanam casket is then opened in the evening, allowing devotees to have darshan. The group carrying the Thiruvabharanam stays overnight at the palace and departs the following morning, continuing the journey to Pandalam Palace via Kuriyanipally, Ullannoor, and Kulanada.
