= Thonnalloor =

Thonnalloor Thonnallur
- Village
- Thonnalloor Pattupurakkavu Devi Temple
- Country: India
- State: Kerala
- District: Pathanamthitta

Languages
  - Official: Malayalam, English
- Time zone: UTC+5:30 (IST)
- PIN: 689501
- Vehicle registration: KL-26
- City: Pandalam
- Climate: Good (Köppen)

Thonnalloor is in Pandalam municipal town, Kerala, India.

== Places of Worship ==
- Pattupurakkavu Bhagavathi Temple
- India Pentecostal Church of God
- Assemblies of God in India
