= Pandalam Bridge =

Pandalam Bridge പന്തളം പാലം
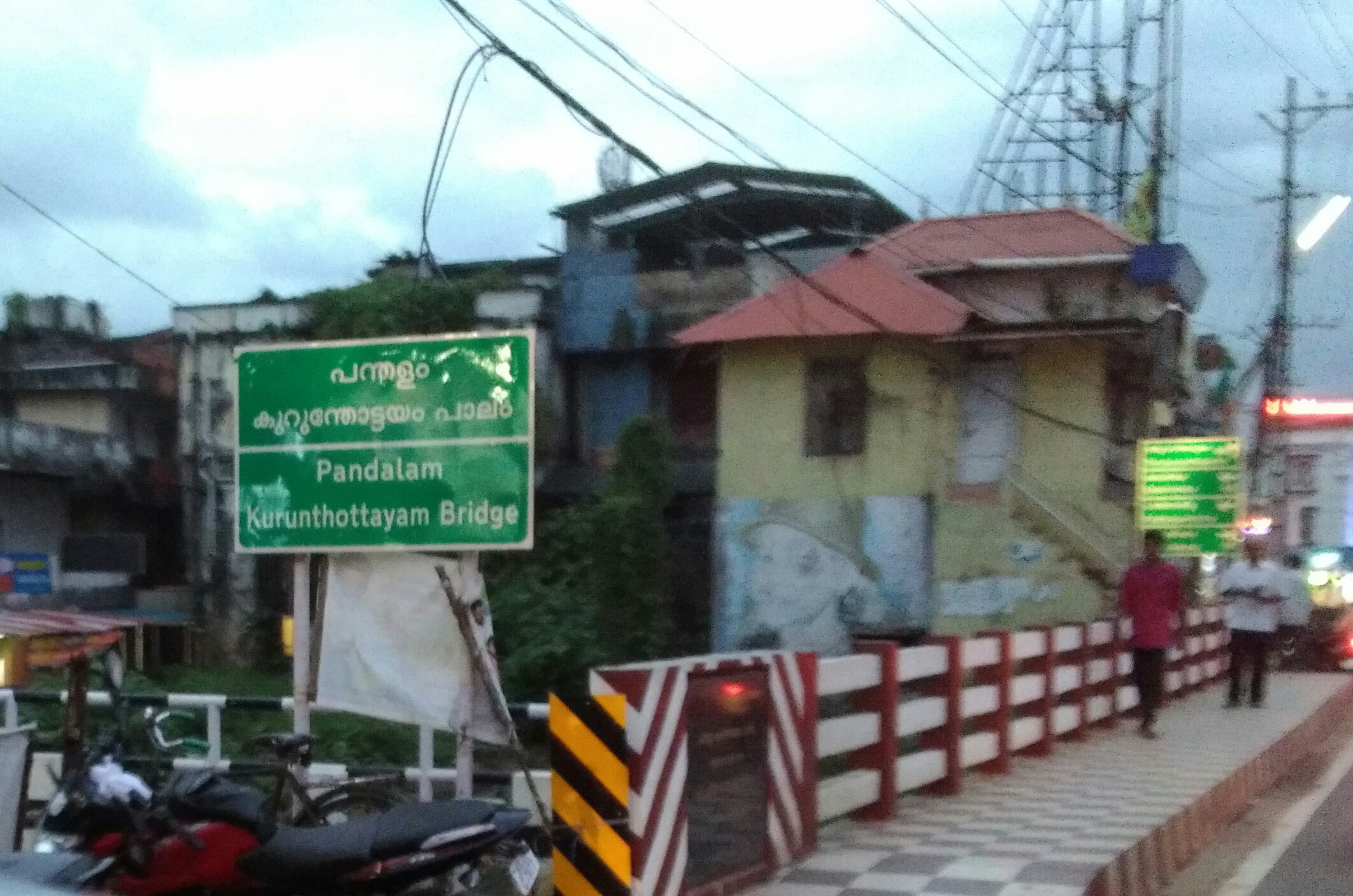
- Coordinates: 9.22°N 76.67°E
- Crosses: Pandalam
- Locale: Pandalam
- Other name: Kurunthottayam Bridge
- Maintained by: Kerala Public Works Department

Characteristics
- Material: Steel
- Width: 47 ft.

History
- Constructed by: Prasanth P. Kumar
- Construction start: 12 July 2016
- Construction end: 15 November 2016
- Construction cost: 4.20 crore INR
- Opened: 14 December 2016; 9 years ago

Statistics
- Toll: Free both ways in city.

Location
- Interactive map of Pandalam Bridge

Pandalam Bridge, popularly known as Kurunthottayam Bridge, is a concrete bridge constructed at Pandalam junction in Kerala, India. Kerala Public Works Department commissioned the bridge and opened for public at December 2016. The cost of the bridge's construction was 4.20 crore INR.

The bridge is 19.35-metre long and 14.6-metre wide and has a 1.5-metre wide pedestrian pathway on either side.

== See also ==
- List of bridges in India
