= Cherickal =

Locality in Pandalam, Kerala, India

Cherickal is a locality in the city of Pandalam. It is geographically situated on the eastern end of the Alappuzha district and the western part of the Pathanamthitta district. The southern end of Cherickal is on the verge of the Alappuzha District (in fact cherickal formed a part of Alappuzha, before it was transferred to the jurisdiction of Pathanamthitta District). Part of Pandalam Municipality and Adoor Taluk, Cherickal comes under the Pathanamthitta Parliamentary and Adoor Assembly Constituencies.

Cherickal is encompassed by valleys, paddy fields, rivulets and streams, as well as country roads that pass through rubber plantations and dales.

== Institutions and Facilities ==
Cherickal has a state-run primary school and is also home to the Mannam Ayurvedic Medical College. The government ITI is also situated in Cherickal.

== Transport ==
Cherickal consist of two neighbouring districts, Alappuzha and Pathanamthitta. National Highway NH 47 passes nearby, through the towns of Kayamkulam, Thiruvananthapuram and Kochi, as well as roads connecting Cochin and Trivandrum. The nearest train station is at Chengannur. Cherickal is also serviced by KSRTC buses from Pandalam.
