= Valiyakoikkal Temple =

Valiyakoyikkal Sastha Temple
- വലിയകോയിക്കൽ ധർമ്മശാസ്താ ക്ഷേത്രം
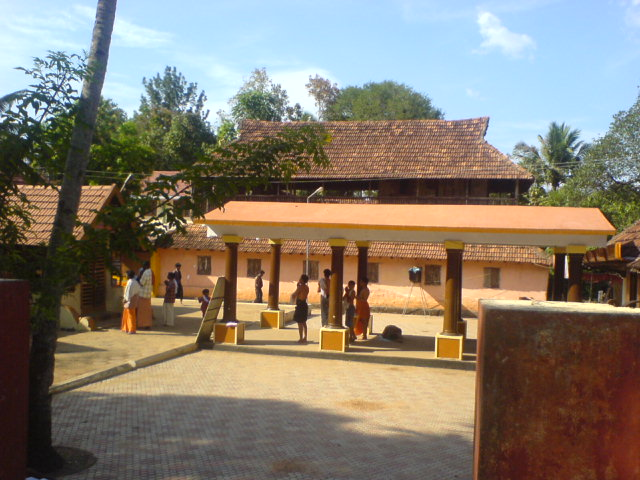
- Valiyakoyikkal Temple

- Valiyakoikkal Temple (Kerala) Valiyakoikkal Temple (India)

Religion
- Affiliation: Hinduism
- District: Pathanamthitta
- Deity: Ayyappan
- Governing body: Travancore Devaswom Board

Location
- Location: Pandalam
- State: Kerala
- Country: India
- Coordinates: 9°14′03.2″N 76°40′31.5″E

Architecture
- Type: Traditional Kerala style
- Creator: Raja Rajasekhara

Specifications
- Temple: One
- Elevation: 35.96 m (118 ft)

Valiakoikkal Temple is the family temple of the Pandalam Royal Family. The temple is located at Pandalam in Pathanamthitta District, Kerala, in the peninsular India. It is situated within the Pandalam Palace premises. The main deity is Ayyappan. Procession of the Thiruvabharanam (Sacred Ornaments) towards Sabarimala shrine starts from the Valiyakoikkal temple every year before the Makaravilakku festival. Millions of devotees visit this temple every year during the Makaravilakku festive season.

== Location ==
This temple is located with the geographic coordinates of 9°14′03.2″N 76°40′31.5″E at an altitude of about 35.96 m above the mean sea level.

== See also ==
- Pandalam
- Ayyappan
- Sabarimala
- Thiruvabharanam
- Pandalam Palace
- Temples of Kerala
