= Kulanada =

- Village
- Location in Kerala, India Kulanada (India)
- Coordinates: 9°14′0″N 76°40′0″E
- Country: India
- State: Kerala
- District: Pathanamthitta

Government
  - Type: Grama Panchayat
  - Panchayat President: Paul Rajan (CPI(M))

Area
  - Total: 21.57 km^{2} (8.33 sq mi)

Population (2011)
  - Total: 23,655
  - Density: 1,097/km^{2} (2,840/sq mi)

Languages
  - Official: Malayalam, English
- Time zone: UTC+5:30 (IST)
- PIN: 689503
- Telephone code: 04734 26 & 04734 20
- Vehicle registration: KL-03
- Nearest city: Pandalam
- Literacy: 100%
- Lok Sabha constituency: Pathanamthitta
- Climate: Good (Köppen)

Kulanada is a village in the district of Pathanamthitta, bordering with Alappuzha district in Kerala state within India. Kulanada assumed its name from the combination of words "Kulam" and "Nada". Kulam meaning pond and Nada meaning the temple where the king of Pandalam worshiped.

The Kulanada village has population of 21,217 of which 9777 are males while 11440 are females as per Population Census 2011. LDF is the current ruling party in Kulanada Panchayath and Paul Rajan is the newly elected president of panchayath. Malayalam is the Local Language spoken here.

== Sub Villages Of Kulanada ==
Ancestors of Kulanada

16.Vattayam
8. Kaluveli
17.Pandissery
4. Ulanadu
18.Panil
9. Koodamparampu
19.Paivazhi
2. Ambalakkadavu
10. Nediyuzhathilpadi
5. Ullannur
11.Panangadu
1. Kulanada
12.Pookaitha
6.Kaipuzha
13. Njettor
3. Punnakulanji
14.Manthuka
7. Kaithakadu
15.Parayankara

== Location ==
Nearby places are Pandalam, Omalloor and Aranmula. The temple which is famous for Uri Vazhipadu, Ulanadu Sreekrishna Swami Temple is located in Kulanada village. The closest railway station is Chengannur (13 KM). Close Airports are Thiruvananthapuram (approximately 110 KM) or Cochin (approximately 140 KM).

== Eminent personalities ==
- Benyamin renowned Malayalam language novelist and screenwriter
- P. K. Manthri prominent cartoonist, known for his famous caricature characters Pachu and Kovalan
- Titto P Thankachen: A well-known Malayalam film lyricist.
- Akash Akhilesh: Founder of Kerala’s first eco-friendly brand, Green Lover and Indian Book of Records holder for launching a startup at 19.

== Schools ==
- Grama Panchayath Higher Secondary school, Kulanada
- Govt. L.P. School, Kulanada
- Shishuvihar, Ulanadu
- GiriDeepam L.P School, R.R.U.P School, Paivazhi
- Govt. U.P. School, Manthuka
- Y.M.C.A KG Pre-School
- M.S.L.P School Ulanadu
- R.R.U.P. School, Paivazhi
- St. John's U.P School Ulanadu
- Prathiksha Buds Rehabilitation Center, Ulanadu

== Temples ==
- Kulanada Devi Temple
- Kaipuzha Sree Krishna Swami Temple
- Pulikkunnil Sree Dharmma Sastha Temple
- Gurunathanmukadi Sri Ayyappaguru
- Ullannur SreeBhadraDevi Temple
- Ulanadu Sree Krishna Swami Temple
- Thumpamon Sree Vadakkunadha Temple
- Thumpinadi Malankaavu Siva Parvathi Temple.
