= Pandalam Suspension Bridge =

Bridge in India

Coordinates: 9°14′09″N 76°40′26″E

Pandalam Suspension Bridge is a pedestrian suspension bridge which crosses the Achankovil River in the state of Kerala, India. It connects Ayyappa Temple with Kaippuzha Sreekrishna Temple.

It is the widest suspension bridge in Kerala. Built by the Kerala State Department of Revenue and Land Survey, the bridge is about 70 metres (230 ft) long and 2.5 metres (8.2 ft) wide.
