= Pattupurakkavu Bhagavathi Temple =

Hindu temple in Kerala, India

- പാട്ടുപുരക്കാവ് ഭഗവതി ക്ഷേത്രം
- Pattupurakkavu Bhagavathi Temple

- Pattupurakkavu Bhagavathi Temple, Pandalam, Pathanamthitta, Kerala

Religion
- Affiliation: Hinduism
- District: Pathanamthitta
- Deity: Bhagavathi

Location
- Location: Pandalam
- State: Kerala
- Country: India
- Coordinates: 9°13′45.7″N 76°40′43.1″E

Architecture
- Type: Kerala architecture
- Elevation: 40.1 m (132 ft)

Thonnallur Pattupurakkavu Bhagavathi temple (Malayalam: തോന്നല്ലൂര് പാട്ടുപുരക്കാവ് ഭഗവതി ക്ഷേത്രം) is a famous Hindu temple at Pandalam, India. It is located one kilometre to the north of Pandalam junction, by the Thiruvananthapuram - Angamaly MC Road. The temple hosted the first ever Devi Bhagavatha Sathram in Kerala, from 28 April – 7 May 2010.

The main deity of the temple is Bhadrakali. The temple also has shrines of other deities such as Ganapathi, Shiva, Udayan, Brahmarakshas, Yakshi, Nāga, Subrahmanyan, Navagraha and Anamarutha. The temple complex also includes an Anakkottil (platform for elephants during the rite Seva), a holy pond, office room, and a few banyan trees. The temple has arrangements for Hindu wedding, including a feast hall and changing rooms. It also has a stage to conduct cultural events. The temple has a Navratri mandapam annexe situated near Pandalam central junction. The deity in the annexed temple is Saraswati, the goddess of knowledge, music, and the arts.

== Location ==
This temple is located with the geographic coordinates of (9°13′45.7″N 76°40′43.1″E) at an altitude of about 40.1 m above the mean sea level.

== Festivals and major occasions ==
The annual temple festival is conducted on the Aswathy day in the Malayalam month of Meenam. Special poojas are performed on that day. Traditional temple art forms and cultural programmes are also conducted. In addition to the festival programmes, the temple also hosts Devi Bhagavath Sathrams, Sapthahams, and Navahams frequently. These include renditions and lectures based on Hindu epics and puranas. The idol erection day is celebrated at the temple in June every year.

Navratri is also of great significance to this temple. Special poojas, Carnatic concerts and cultural programmes are performed at the Navratri Mandapam annexe. Apart from Hindus, the organising committee for the Navratri festival includes people from other religions also, including Muslims and Christians. This symbolises the religious and cultural harmony of Pandalam. The Navratri Mandapam has facility to initiate Vidyarambham at the completion of Navratri celebrations.
