= Kadammanitta Vasudevan Pillai =

Indian artist

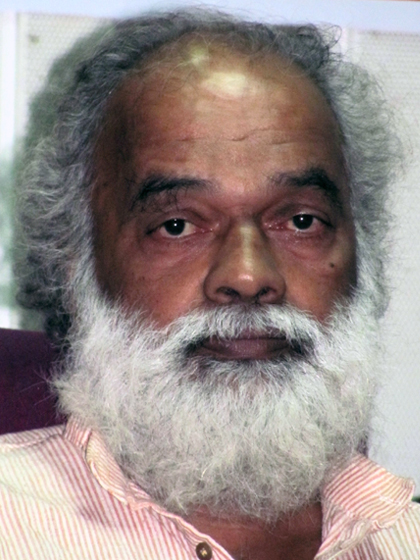
Kadammanitta Vasudevan Pillai

Prof. Kadammanitta Vasudevan Pillai, is a Padayani exponent from Kerala, India. He is the former Vice Chairman of the Kerala Folklore Academy, a professor in mathematics, a writer and public speaker.

== Early and professional life ==
Vasudevan Pillai was born to M. R. Ramakrishna Pillai (late) and Parukutty Amma (late), at a small village called Kadammanitta in Pathanamthitta district Kerala on 24 May 1947. His only sister is Omana Kumariamma. From childhood itself, he was interested in Padayani and Kerala folklore. He completed his pre-school and graduated from Catholicate College in Pathanamthitta. He did his MSc in Mathematics from Ravi Shankar University in Raipur state of Chhattisgarh (then Madhya Pradesh) and was the first rank holder. He completed his Post Graduation with Gold medal. He later came back to Kerala and joined as lecturer in Mathematics in various colleges of NSS Management in Kerala. He worked in NSS College, Pandalam for most of the time, till his retirement as Head of Department in 2002. He has served as the vice chairman of The Kerala Folklore Academy from 1997 to 2001.

== As Padayani exponent and writer ==
Vasudevan Pillai has contributed greatly to the field of Kerala folklore. He has written books on Padayani and other traditional art forms.

- Padayaniyile pala kolangal
- Padayani
- Padayaniyude jeevathalam
- Padayani : Janakeya anushtaana nadakam (Mahatma Gandhi University textbook)
- Padayani : Oru ithihasa nadakam
- Padayani : The traditional epi theater (English, but not a translation)
- Vamsheeya sangeetha shastram
- Ethino musicology (English, but not a translation)
- Apasaraka bimbangalude aasura gethiroopangal (study on Kadammanitta poetry)
- Kadinjoo pottan (drama based on Kadammanitta poetry)

== Awards ==
He is the recipient of State Awards for his literary and cultural contributions.

- Kerala Sangeetha Nataka Akademi Award (1995)
- Kerala Sahitya Akademi Award for Scholarly Literature (1996)

== His Guru ==
The guru to Kadammanitta Vasudevan Pillai is Kadammanitta Raman Nair, the father of famous poet Kadammanitta Ramakrishnan.

== Other contributions ==
His bond with villages can be seen clearly in his works. His association with the great poet of Kerala Kadammanitta Ramakrishnan led to many valuable literary contributions.

The youth of Kadammanitta, under the leadership of Vasudevan Pillai, had formed Kadammanitta Gothra Kala Kalari through which this art form has been taught to many and is being passed over to generations.

== Personal life ==
He currently lives in Kadammanitta. He is married to D. Omana Kumari and is father of three - Kadammanitta Manu (Mrudangam Artist), Kadammanitta Anu (Singer) and Lakshmi (Violin Artist). His company with Kadammanitta Ramakrishnan had led to the rise of many literary contributions.
