= Thumpamon =

- Village
- Location in Kerala, India Thumpamon (India)
- Coordinates: 9°13′0″N 76°43′0″E
- Country: India
- State: Kerala
- District: Pathanamthitta

Government
  - Body: Thumpamon Grama Panchayat

Area
  - Total: 70.84 km^{2} (27.35 sq mi)

Population (2015)
  - Total: 98,705
  - Density: 975/km^{2} (2,530/sq mi)

Languages
  - Official: Malayalam, English
- Time zone: UTC+5:30 (IST)
- PIN: 689502
- Telephone code: 0091-4734
- Vehicle registration: KL-26
- Nearest city: Pandalam
- Sex ratio: 1000 Males : 1805 Females ♂/♀
- Literacy: 94.09% (91.97% - Females, 96.53% - Males)%
- Civic agency: Thumpamon Grama Panchayat
- Climate: Tropical Wet (Köppen)

Thumpamon is a village in Pandalam (5 km Approx), a part of Adoor thaluk in Kerala, India. One of the greatest attractions of this village is the Achenkovil River, which is known for its natural sceneries along the riverbank. The village relies on non-resident Indian and crops like rubber, coconut, paddy and pepper. The most common crop in the village is rubber. Because of non-resident Indians, this is one of the wealthiest villages in Kerala. Thumpamon is divided into two regions, Thumpamon North and Thumpamon South, by the Achenkovil River. In Thumpamon Panchayath Indian National Congress is the current ruling party and BJP emerged as the one and only official main opposition party in the Panchayath. CPM and other left parties has no representation in the Panchayath.

== Nearest important places ==
- Pandalam (5 km)
- Adoor (11.3 km)
- Chengannur (18 km)
- Elavumthitta (5 km)
- Omalloor (8 km)

== Historical & Religious edifices ==
- Thumpamon Vadakkumnatha Temple dedicated to Vadakkumnatha is 500m away from main junction but the temple is situated in kulanada panchayat on the banks of Achankovil river. It is one of the ancient temples in Kerala.
- Thumpamon Valiya Pally (St Marys Orthodox Cathedral/ Thumpamon Bhadrasana Pally) is an ancient church located here. It is the headquarters of the Thumpamon Diocese of the Malankara Orthodox Syrian Church. The church first was built in 717 and it is among the oldest churches in Kerala.
- Other churches are St Mary's Kadheeshtha Orthodox church Thumpamon North, St Marys Orthodox church, Cheneerkara St Marys Orthodox church, Mathoor St George Orthodox Valiyapally Erom, Thumpamon Immanuel Marthoma Church, Thumpamon St Thomas Orthodox church and some Orthodox chapels. The Kuriakose Ketchup Church was built here in 1923.
- There are also Pentecostal churches such as AG, IPC, TPM.
- Pulickal Kalari - Another historical building in this area is pulickal kalari, the traditional gymnasium giving training in attack and self-defense. During the chera chola war numerous Kalaris were established in Kerala. The famous warrior class of Cheralam (Kerala), the Nairs, formed Suicide Squads for attacking cholas. This kalari might also established during this time. But now only the building existed and the kalari is not functioning,

== Gallery ==
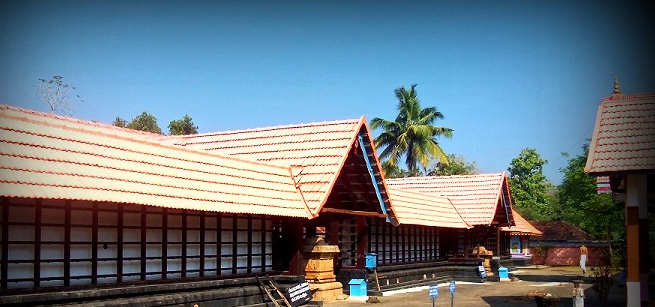
Thumpamon Vadakkumnathan Temple

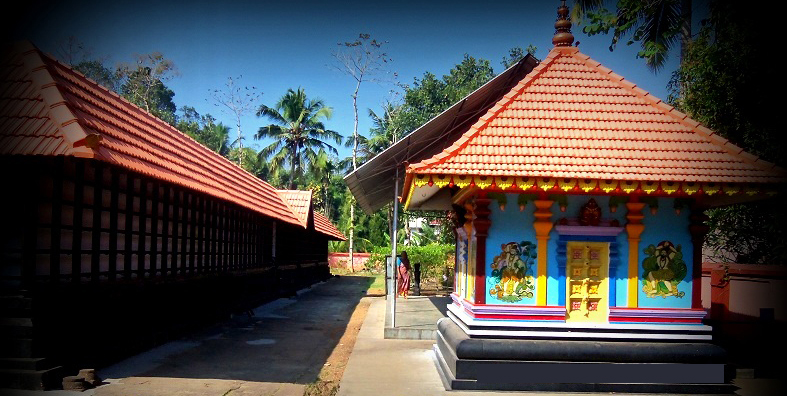
Thumpamon Vadakkumnathan Temple

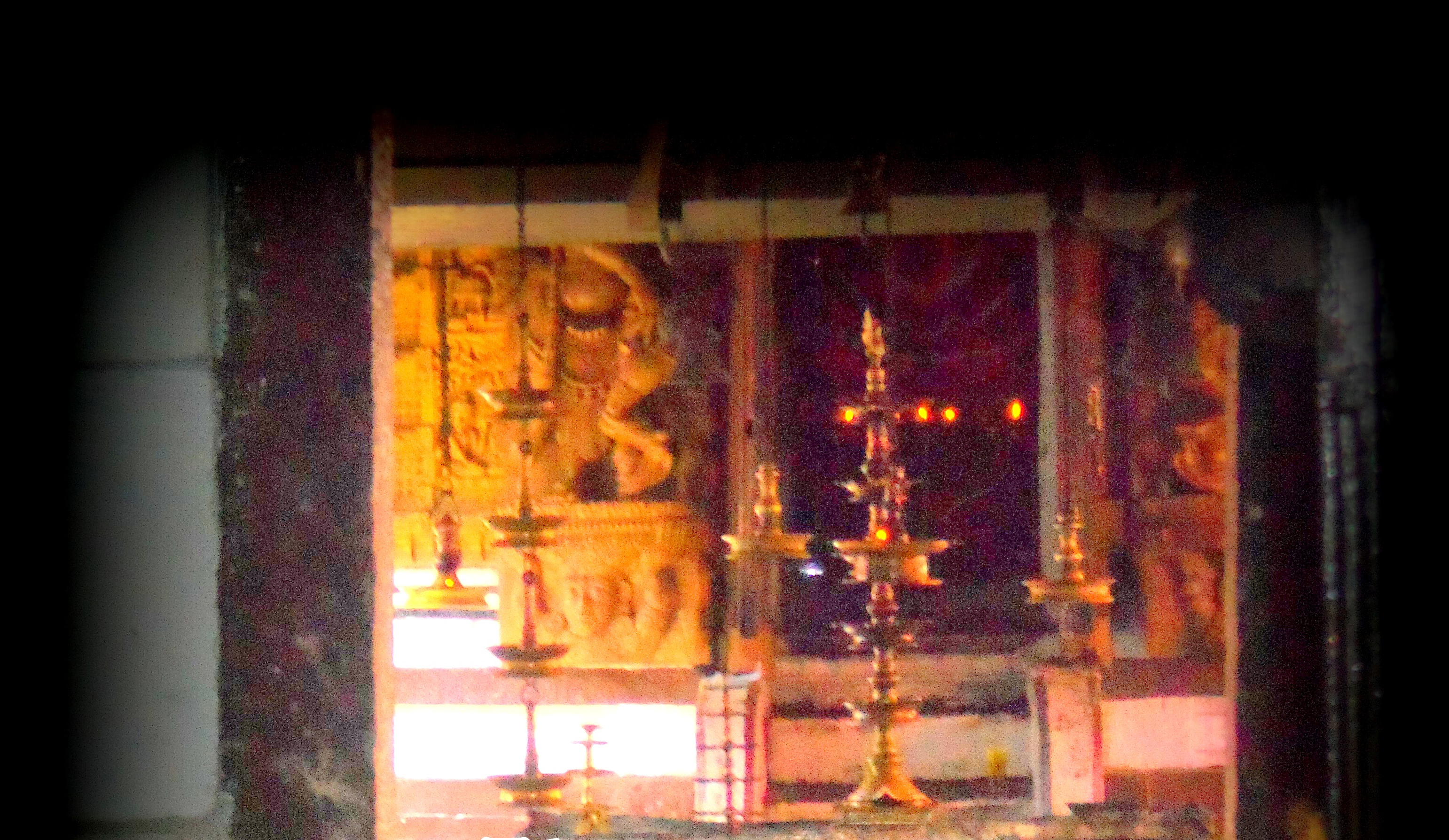
Thumpamon Vadakkumnathan Temple

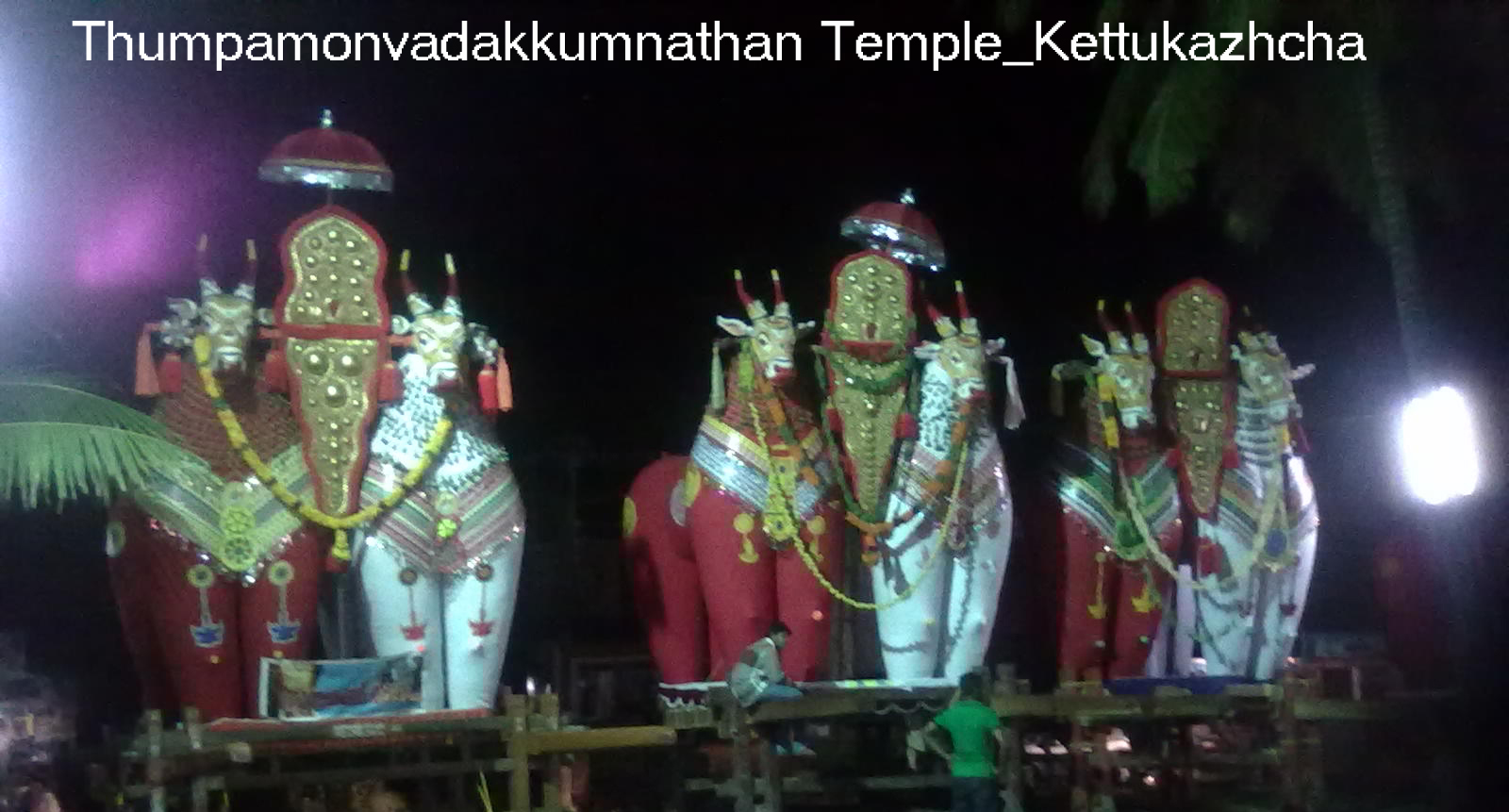
Thumpamon Vadakkumnathan Temple

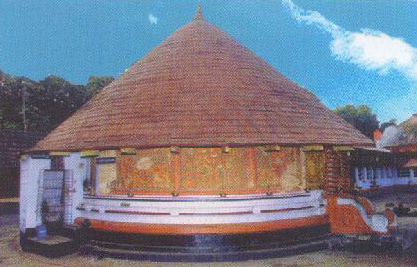
Thekkumnathan Sreekovil

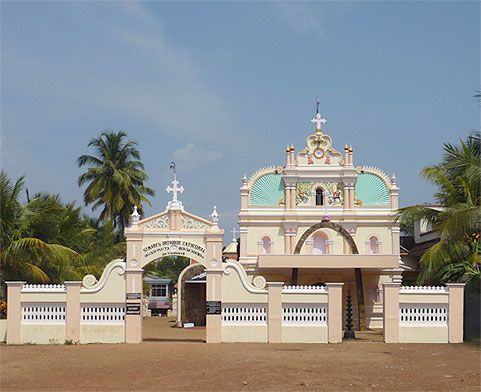
St.Mary's Orthodox Syrian Cathedral Thumpamon

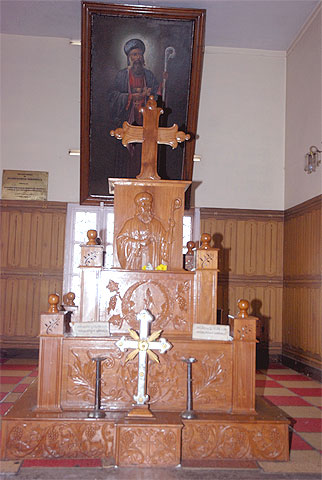
Holy Relic of Parumala Thirumeni (St.Gregorious of Parumala)

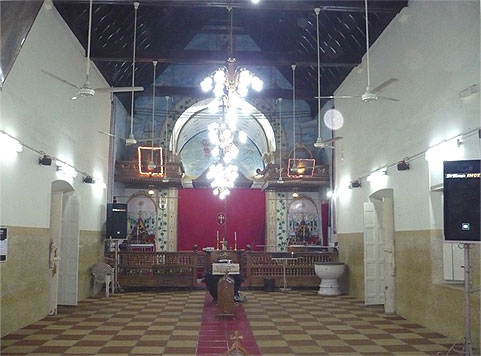
Inside view of St.Mary's Orthodox Syrian Cathedral Thumpamon

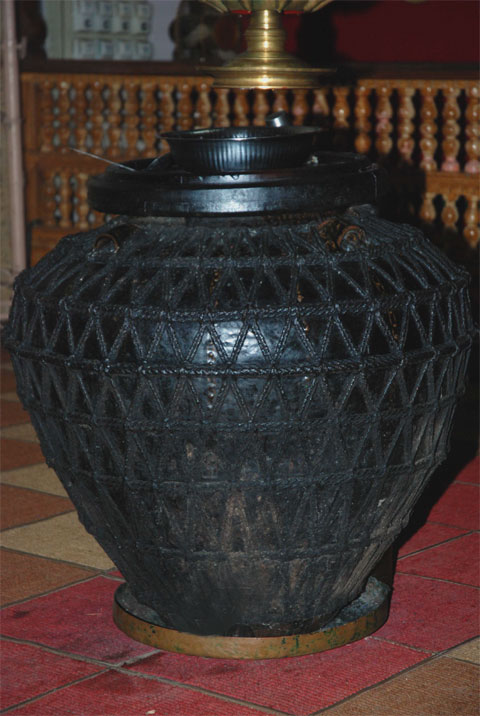
Ancient jar inside the church

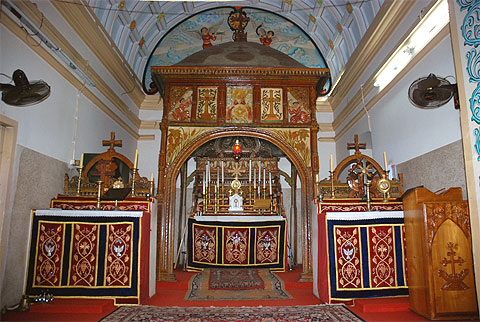
Madhboho altar

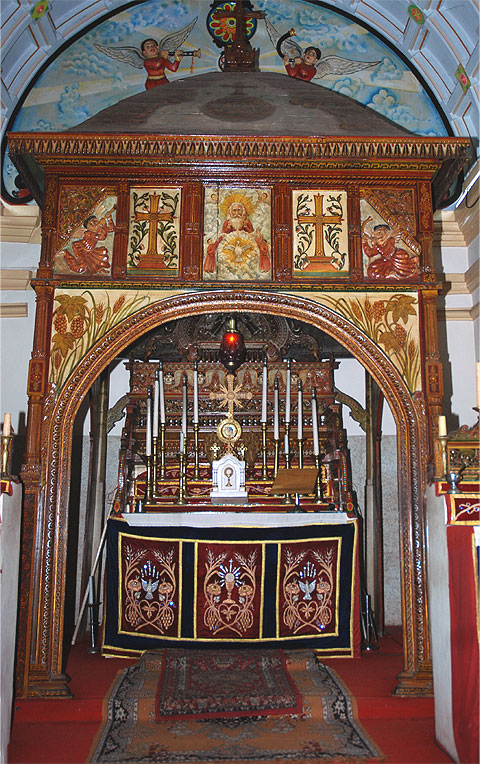
Church's Madhboho altar, close-up view

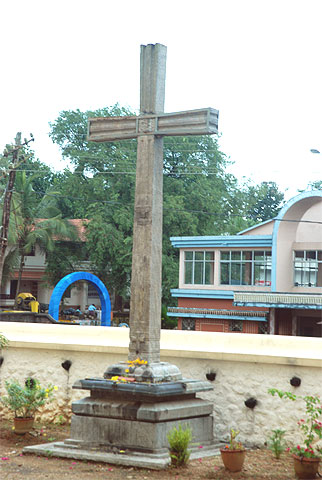
Stone Cross

Moru Curry factory

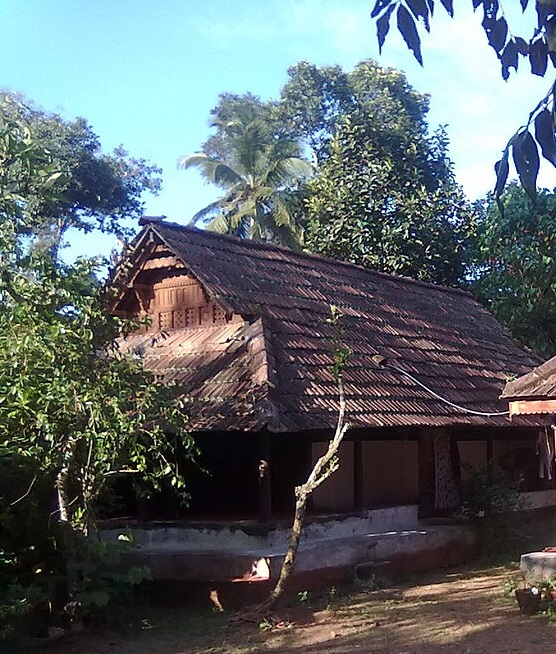
Pulickal Kalari
