= Pandalam Sudhakaran =

Indian politician (born 1955)

Pandalam Sudhakaran Ex. MLA
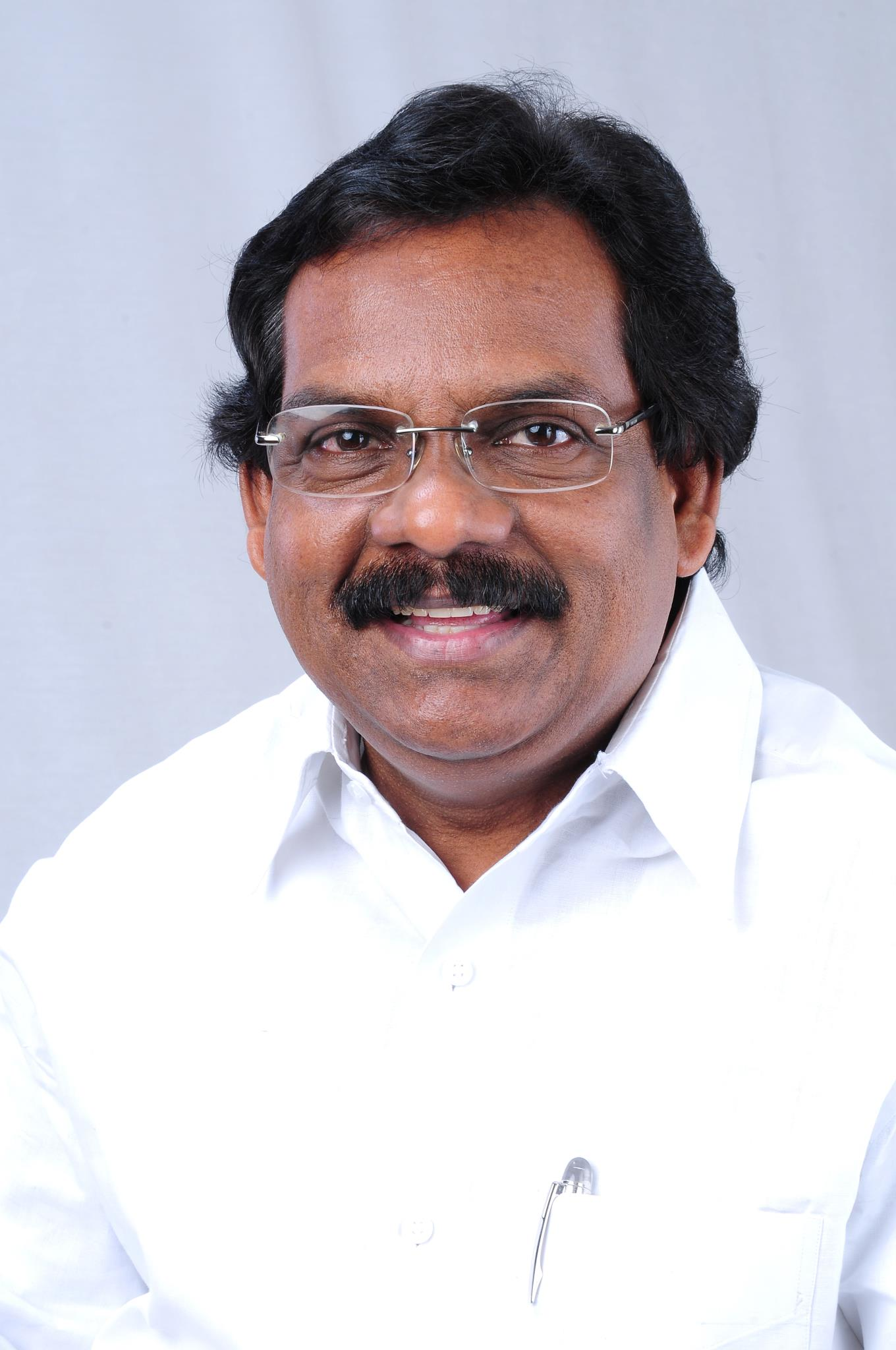

Personal details
- Born: 22 November 1955 (age 70) Pandalam

Pandalam Sudhakaran (born 22 November 1955, in Pandalam, Kerala, India) is an Indian politician who belongs to Indian National Congress party. He became elected to the Kerala Legislative Assembly for the first time in 1982 as Congress party candidate from Wandoor Constituency. He got elected again in 1982, '87 and '91 from the same constituency.

== Political positions held ==
- 1978–1982 Kerala Students Union Vice President, General Secretary
- 1982–1989 Youth Congress Vice President, General Secretary
- 1982–1996 Member, Kerala Legislative Assembly (Wandoor)
- 1989–1992 Youth Congress State President
- 1987–1991 Whip, Congress Legislative Party
- 1991–1996 Minister for Scheduled castes and scheduled tribes, Sports and Youth Affairs, CADA in K. Karunakaran Govt.
- 1995–1996 Minister Excise and Sc/ST, Backward Community in A K Antony Govt.

He was a member of the Gandhiji University Syndicate, Calicut University Senate, Kerala Pradesh Congress Committee (KPCC) executive, AICC, Trivandrum Doordarshan Kendra Advisory Board. He was a Jury member of Kerala state film award committee. He was director of Kerala State Film Development Corporation. KPCC General Secretary, Chairman Kerala Tourism Development Corporation (KTDC), Director of JaiHind TV, and Vice Chairman of the Malayalam Cine technicians Association (MACTA), Executive Board Member of Kerala Kalamandalam, Spokesman of KPCC (from 2013 onwards).
