= P. K. Manthri =

Indian cartoonist (1933–1984)

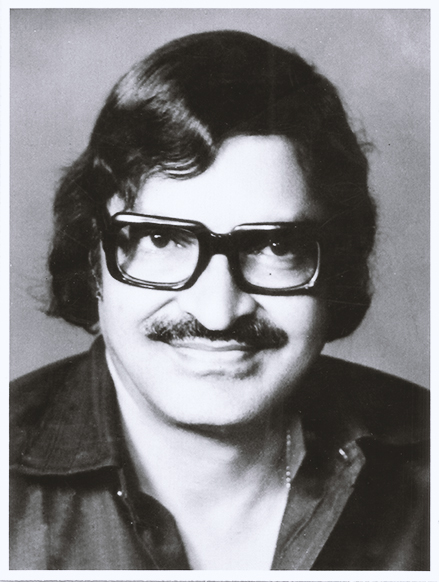
- Born: 21 May 1933; Pandalam, Pathanamthitta, Kerala, India
- Died: 6 December 1984 (aged 51)
- Occupation: Cartoonist
- Parent(s): Poomangalathu Kesavan and Kochikka

P. K. Manthri (real name P. K. Manthri Kumaran) (21 May 1933 – 6 December 1984) was an Indian cartoonist.

== Personal life ==
Manthri was born to Poomangalathu Kesavan and Kochikka, at Pandalam in Kerala, India. His father was a school manager and headmaster. Manthri studied painting from the Ravi Varma School of Arts, Mavelikkara.

== Career ==
He drew cartoons mainly for Thaniniram daily, although he started drawing cartoons for Sarasan in 1950s. He also published cartoons in Asadhu, and Narmada. Later, his works appeared in Mathrubhumi, Janayugam, Malayala Nadu, Malayala Rajyam, and Manorajyam. Pachu, Kovalan, Mr. Kunju etc. are popular cartoon characters created by Manthri. Manthri himself appeared in many of his own cartoons. The beauty of his cartoon character Pachu's wife earned a lot of praise from readers, and was mentioned by Professor M. Krishnan Nair in his weekly article Sahitya Varabhalam in Kalakaumudi weekly. Manthri was a drawing teacher by profession but he left this in 1954. For some time, he worked for Calicut papers Desabhimani and Mathrubhumi. Then he joined the government education department, while continuing to work as a cartoonist. His rash criticism through cartoons - in particular, a cartoon Kudanannakkan Aalilla which targeted the irregular appointment of Arabic teachers in schools from a particular community - irritated the then education minister C. H. Muhammed Koya. As a result, Manthri was suspended from government service for two and a half years from 1969. While he was under suspension, he still drew cartoons using the pseudonym 'Thanthri'. He also published a cartoon book named Chithrahasyam during this period. Over 20,000 copies of the book were circulated. He was allowed back into government service in 1973, as per the report of the then government secretary Malayattoor Ramakrishnan, who was also a cartoonist and novelist. Malayatoor mentioned this incident in his service story.

Manthri was responsible for making the first animated film title in Malayalam cinema. This was the movie Poocha Sanyasi, directed by Hariharan. Cartoonist and publisher Cartoonist Shankar had invited Manthri to Delhi several times to become part of the Shankar's Weekly, but Manthri was not willing to relocate to Delhi.

== Notable works ==
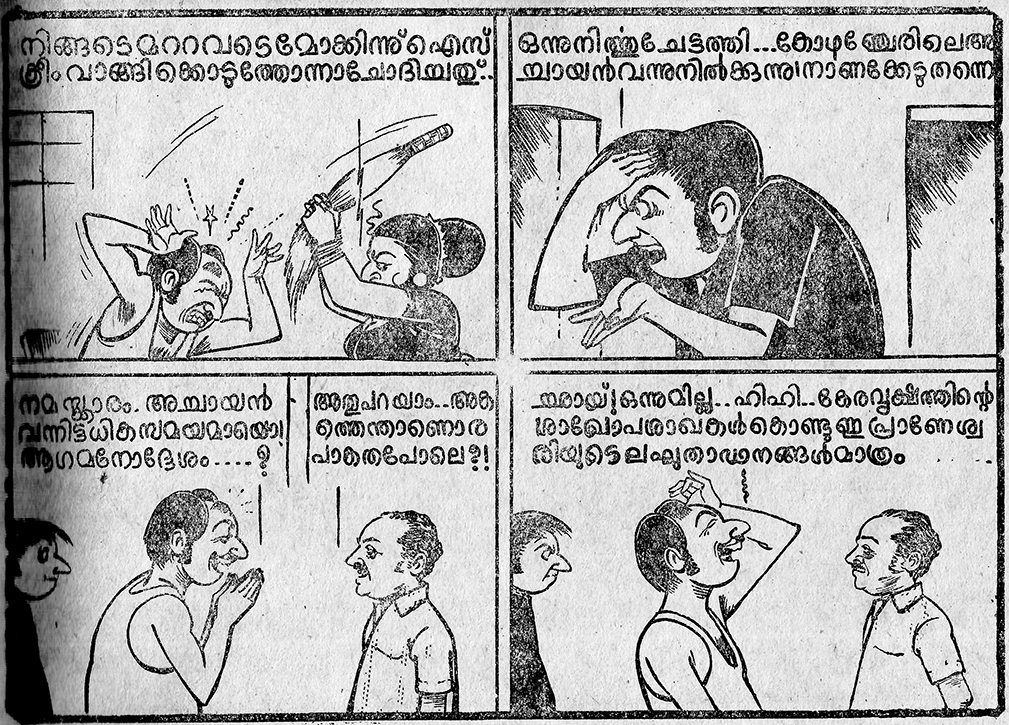
Work by P K Manthri published in Malayalam weekly "MANORAJYAM" in 1979

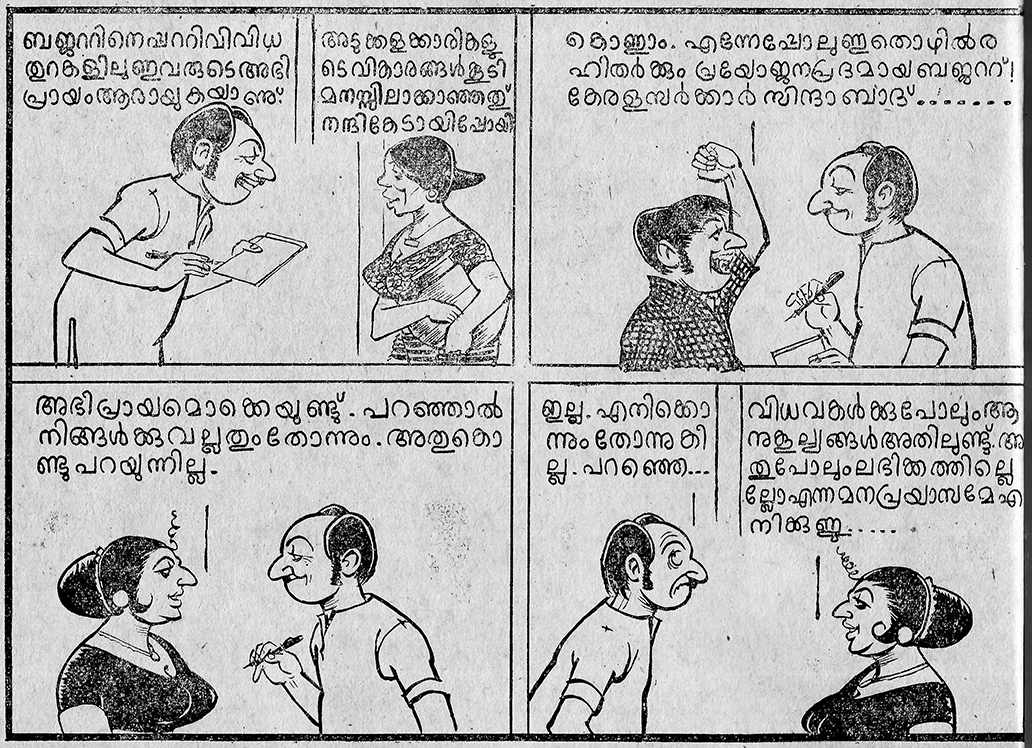
Work by P K Manthri published in Malayalam weekly "MANORAJYAM" in 1979

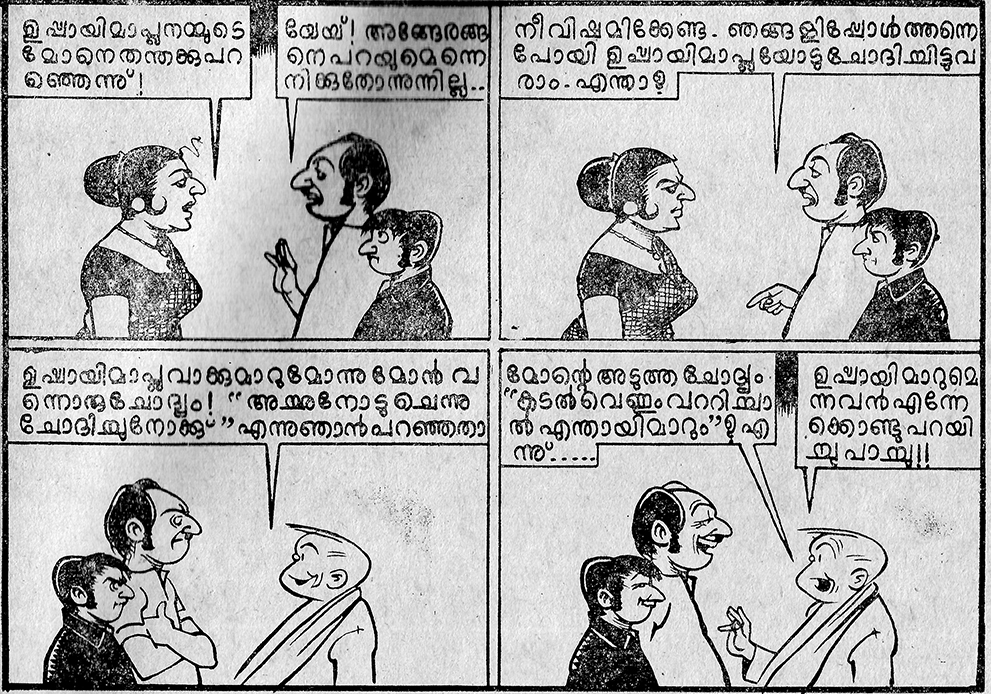
Work by P K Manthri published in Malayalam weekly "MANORAJYAM" in 1979

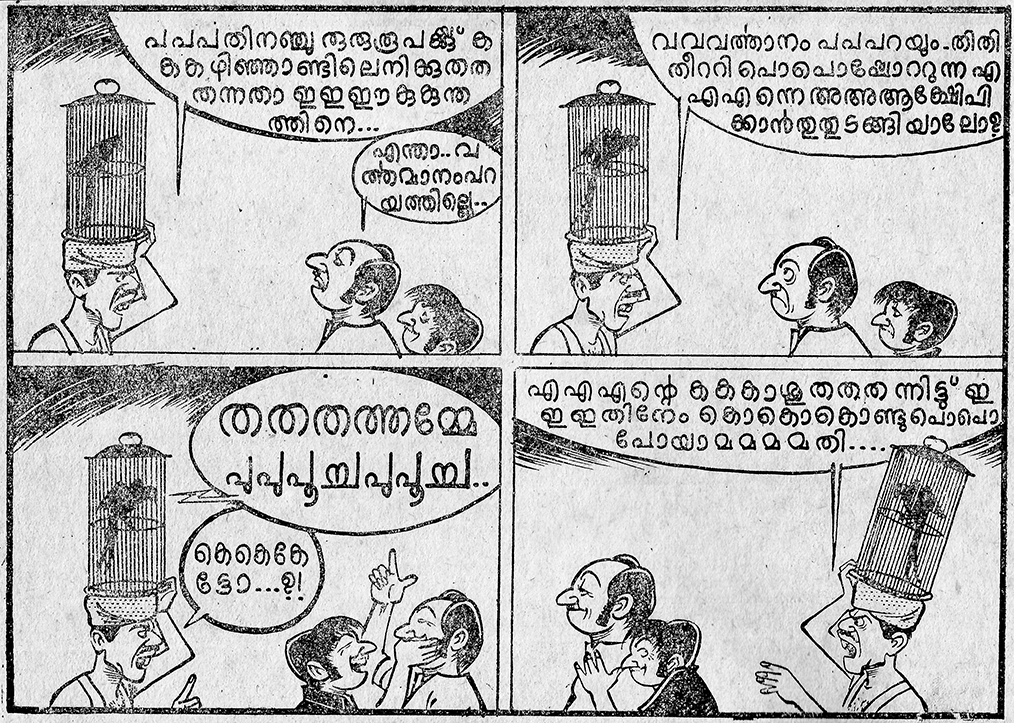
Work by P K Manthri published in Malayalam weekly "MANORAJYAM" in 1979
