= Pandalam Thekkekara =

Village in Kerala, India

Pandalam Thekkekkara Panchayath

Population (2001)
  - Total: 24,278

Languages
  - Official: Malayalam, English
- Time zone: UTC+5:30 (IST)
- PIN: 691525
- Telephone code: Adoor, Pandalam, Kaipttoor
- Vehicle registration: KL-26
- Nearest city: Adoor
- Lok Sabha constituency: Pathanamthitta
- Vidhan Sabha constituency: Adoor
- Climate: Good (Köppen)

Pandalam Thekkekkara Panchayath പന്തളം തെക്കേക്കര പഞ്ചായത്ത്‌

Type
- Type: Panchayath

History
- Founded: 1990

Leadership
- President: Sreedevi J (BJP)
- Vice President: Krishna Kumar PS (BJP)
- Opposition Leader: No official opposition

Structure
- Seats: 15
- Political groups: NDA: 10 seats LDF: 3 seats OTH: 2 seats

Pandalam Thekkekara is a panchayath and also a cultural-spiritual village town in Adoor thaluk of Pathanamthitta district in the state of Kerala, India. Thattayil Orippurathu Bhagavathi Temple, Vrindavanam Venugopala Temple, Thattayil Ayyappa Temple, Thirumangalam Mahadeva Temple, Varikolil Vishnu Temple, Kandalanthara Shiva Temple, Anakuzhi Malanada Temple, Mynagappallil Anapoorneshwari Temple, Gurunadankkavu Temple are the main religious centres located here. Orippuram Meenabharani, Meenakarthika and Meena Thiruvathira festivals are the major festivals in Pandalam Thekkekkara Panchayath. Also, there are some important festivals happens in panchayath including Parappetty Pettathullal.

NSS Polytechnic College Pandalam and NSS Higher Secondary School, Thattayil are situated in the panchayath. St.John's School (CBSE) is also situated near to Keerukuzhy ward of Pandalam Thekkekkara. Mannath Padmanabhan started Nair Service Society Karayogam Movement from two very old Nair tharavadu such as Edayirethu and Kalluzhathil which situates in this Panchayath and hence The No.1 and No.2 NSS Karayogams situates at Pandalam Thekkekkara (Thattayil ) .Mannath Padmanabhan also quoted about the Nairs of Thatta in his autobiography book "Ente Jeevitham Smaranakal". Mohanlal starred famous Malayalam feature film Appu (1990 film) shot in Pandalam Thekkekkara. There are currently 14 Wards in Pandalam Thekkekkara Panchayath. BJP is the current ruling party.Many eminent personalities like Internationally acclaimed pictorial orator and World's Fastest Cartoonist Dr. Jitheshji, Former State Chief of RSS Govindan Nair hails from this Panchayath.

Major political parties are BJP, CPM, CPI & INC.

Agriculture is the main occupation in the Panchayath.

Pandalam Thekkekkara Panchayath is bordered by 2 Municipalities (Pandalam and Adoor) and other 3 panchayaths (Kodumon, Vallicode and Thumpamon). Kulanada grama panchayath is also near to Pandalam Thekkekkara Panchayath. Pandalam Thekkekkara comes under Pathanamthitta Loksabha Constituency and Adoor Legislative Assembly Constituency. National Highway NH 183A and NH 183 passes through Pandalam Thekkekkara Panchayath.

Reading Room & Library: Many libraries are in Pandalam Thekkekara, however few are not functioning well.

The first library was in the old Panchayath building and its first librarian was T.K. Gopala Kurup.

== Demographics ==
As of 2011 India census, Pandalam Thekkekara had a population of 24069 with 11098 males and 12971 females. Hinduism is the major religion covers population with 86%, Christianity with 13%, others below 1%. In Caste wise Pandalam Thekkekkara is a Nairs dominant area.
