= Thumpamon Vadakkumnatha Temple =

Hindu temple in Kerala, India

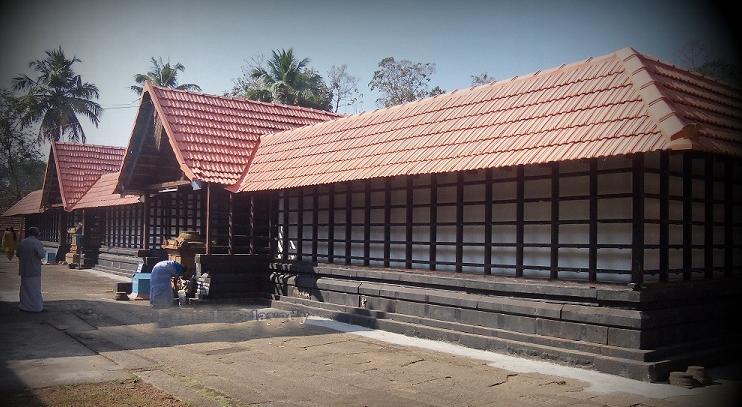
- Thumpamon Vadakkumnatha Temple

- Thumpamon Vadakkumnatha Temple, Pandalam, Pathanamthitta, Kerala

Religion
- Affiliation: Hinduism
- District: Pathanamthitta
- Deity: Murugan
- Festivals: Uthrada Maholsavam, Maha Shivaratri

Location
- Location: Pandalam
- State: Kerala
- Country: India
- Coordinates: 9°13′46.0″N 76°42′38.3″E

Architecture
- Type: Traditional Kerala style
- Elevation: 38.22 m (125 ft)

Website
- thumpamonvadakkumnathan.in

Thumpamon Vadakkumnatha Temple is an ancient Lord Subhramanya temple near Pandalam in Pathanamthitta in Kerala, India. This temple has two Sreekovils (sanctum sanctorum). Both Sreekovils are round (vatta). It is an age old temple whispering several fascinating legends of the bygone eras. It is one of the two major Subhramanya swamy temples in pathanamthitta district. Also this is one of the rare temples with 2 Lord Muruga main deities in 2 sreekovils.

The first Sreekovil of this temple is dedicated to a deity named as Vadakkumnathan (the warrior form of Lord Muruga). The day to day pooja procedure of the deity consider the lord as a representation of Lord Subramanya or Murugan, i.e. Lord Kartikeya. But some worshippers formerly believed that the Lord installed in this Sreekovil is a form of Lord Shiva. Anyway, the concept of Lord Murugan is more famous.

The deity in the second Sreekovil (known as Thekkumnathan) is Balamurugan (Child form of Lord Muruga). It is believed that this deity was worshiped by Sakthibhadra the author of Acharya Chudamani (a drama for Koodiyattam). The Sreekovil has been adorned with magnificent mural paintings that augment its beauty. The important festivals that are celebrated in this temple include Uthrada Maholsavam (Thiruvutsavam - yearly celebration) Sreemath Bhagavatha Sapthaham, Mahashivarathri, Thaipooya Ulsavam, Vishu, Onam, etc. The Uthrada Maholsavam is celebrated in the Uthradam star of Malayalam month Meenam.

== Design ==
The general form of Thumpamon Sree Vadkkumnatha temple is based on the Pancha-Prakara Layout-scheme of the traditional Kerala temples. The Bhakti movement and resurgence of Hinduism also marked the revival of temple construction. According to Kularnava Tantra human body itself is a temple and Sadashiva or Paramathma is the deity in this temple. This Sidhantha (theory) is adopted in the construction of Kerala Temples. Sreekovil or Garbhagruham (sanctum sanctorum) is considered as the head of the deity, Antharalam or inner Balivattom is considered as the face, Mukhamandapam or Namaskara mandapam is considered as the neck, Nalambalam is considered as the hands, Pradakshinaveethi is considered as the Kukshi Pradesa (stomach), compound wall is considered as the legs and the main Gopuram is considered as the foot of the deity. That means Panchaprakaras (Prakaram or compound wall, Bahyahara or Sheevelippura, Madhyahara or Vilakkumadam, Anthahara or Nalambalam and Antharalam or inner Balivattom) of the temple is the Sthoola Sareera (visible part of the body) of the deity. The Deva Prathishta or idol inside the Sreekovil or Garbhagriha and the Shadaadharas (Aadharashila, Nidhikumbham, Padmam, Koormam, Yoganaalam and Napumsaka Shila) under the Prathishta is the Sookshma Sareera (soul) of the deity. The Dwajam (flag staff) or Kodimaram is the spinal code of the deity. Hence a typical Kerala temple resembles a human body in all aspects. Fully realising the need to create places of worship that would attract devotees, the Pancha-Prakara scheme became the standard for temple architecture. The dimensions of the five components of the temple architecture are laid out in Tantra Samucchaya, a treatise on temple architecture, compiled and written in ca. 1300 AD. The five (Pancha) enclosures (Prakaras) around the Sanctum of the Thumpamon Sree Vadkkumnatha temple is as follows:

=== Pancha-Prakaara layout ===
1. Akatthe-Balivattam - (a) The innermost enclosure, which includes two Sreekovils for building housing of the principal deities Vadakkumnathan and Thekkumnathan. (b) Anthar-Mandala: Space outside the Sreekovil occupied by protective deities in the form of small stone platforms - Bali-Kall (c) Namaskaara-Mandapa: A raised platform for prostrations 2. Naalambalam / Chuttambalam - Area around the sanctum which consists of (a) Valia-Ambalam: Covered spaces around the Sreekovil for rituals and prayers (b) Thittapalli: A small temple kitchen (c) Mulayara: Storage space for grains, fruits, utensils, firewood 3. Madhya Haara / Vilakku Madom - The Vilakkumadom galaxy of lamps around temple, lost in the "dark ages", was reconstructed recently. 4. Puratthe-Balivattam / Sivelippura - Outer enclosure and cirumambulatory pathway consists the following: (a) Agra-Mandapa: Pathway leading to the Naalambalam (b) Valiya-Balikall: Large decorated stone platform for sacrificial offerings (c) Bali-Peetha: Positions for protective deities outside the temple (d) Kshetra-Paala: Positions for temple guardians (e) Kovil of minor deities: Sub-shrines within the temple compound The temple had lost the Sivelippura and Koothamabalam (the enclosure for temple musicians) in the "dark ages". 5. Maryaada / Puram Mathil - The outer boundary wall consists the following: (a) Gopuram - Tower marking the main gateways (b) Reconstructed Oottu-Pura: Lunch-hall (c) Puram-Mathil: Outer-wall

== History ==
The evolution of Thumpamon Sreevadkkumnatha temple is closely related to the evolution of other great temples in Kerala and the Kerala’s social and cultural history. Historians divide the history of Kerala temples into four stages:

1. Earliest shrines (Before 300 BC)
2. Age of Jain temples (ca. 300 BC to 500 AD)
3. Age of Buddhist temples (ca. 200 BC to 800 AD)
4. Revival of Hinduism & the 'new' Brahminical temples (ca. 800 AD onwards)

According to this classification, Thumpamon Sree Vadkkumnatha temple belongs to the third and fourth stages. This temple consists two Sreekovils (Sanctum Sanctorum). Both Sreekovils are round (Vatta) in shape. The deity in the first Sreekovil is called Vadakkumnatha. Some worshipers believe that this deity is Shiva. Some another worshipers believe that this deity is Muruga and another opinion is that the deity is Vishnu. Not too much evidence is remaining about the deity in first Sreekovil, i.e., Vadakkumnatha. In between 300 BC and 800 AD the Hinduism was dominated by Jainism and Buddhism. Both these religions are originated from the revival movements in Hinduism. Buddhism was introduced in Kerala by the missions sent out by emperor Ashoka. For more than 700 years, Buddhism flourished in Kerala. The Paliyam copper plates of the Ay King, Varaguna (885-925 AD) shows that at least in South Kerala, Buddhists continued to enjoy royal patronage even until 1000 AD. According to some of the historians in Kerala, many Hindu temples were once Buddhist shrines, including Vadakkunathan temple of Thrissur. So Thumpamon Sree Vadkkumnatha temple might also have a close relation to the Buddhist tradition.

Shankaracharya and the Revival of Hinduism by Brahmin scholars in 800-1000 AD gradually wiped out Buddhism from Kerala. Royal patronage by the Vaishnavite Kulashekara dynasty hastened this process. The Vedic Brahmins arrived in Kerala only in 700-800 AD, along the west coast Tulu-nadu and from Andhra Pradhesh (Thazhamom madom, the Thanthris of Thumpamon Sree Vadkkumnatha Temple belongs to Andhra Pradesh). But unlike in North India, the Brahmins in Kerala adopted the Tantric form of temple ritual-worship.

During the time of Maurya Sharman, a Kadamba King, large colonies of Brahmins from North India were invited to settle in Tulu and Kerala. In 792 AD, King Udaya Varman of Mooshika dynasty settled 237 Brahmin families in Kerala. One tradition has it that six outstanding Brahmins came with these immigrants, defeated Buddhist leaders in public debates and established the intellectual supremacy of Hinduism. (Nearby Thumpamon Sree Vadkkumnatha temple there are house names like Velenikkal Madom, Onpalli Madom, Thazhamon Madom etc.). The Brahmin scholars like Guru Prabhakara and Shankaracharya (788-820 AD) reinforced the supremacy of Hinduism. It is believed that the deity (Balamuruga) in the second Sreekovil of the Thumpamon Sree Vadkkumnatha temple (known as Thekkumnathan) was worshiped by Sakthibhadra, the author of Acharya Chudamani. Sakthibhadra was a contemporary of Shankaracharya and after completing Achrya Choodanani he had given it to Sankaracharya for his opinion. That time Shankaracharya was at Chenganoor Mahadeva temple and was in Munavritha. So he did not give the opinion and Sakthibhadra thought that Shankarachrya does not like his text. So he burned it. But after some times Shankara visited Shakthibhadra and said that the text was remarkable. But Shakthibhadra informed Shankara, that he had burned the text. Then Shankara recaptured the full text from his memory and gave it to Shakthibhadra. All these stories relate the Thumpamon Sree Vadkkumnatha temple to Shankara and Shakthibhadra.

During the reign of the Chera King Rama Varma Kulashekara (1090-1102 AD), Kerala was overrun by the mighty Cholas, led by Koluthunga I. The Cholas burnt down Mahodayapuram (1012 AD), the capital of the Cheras and destroyed Kollam (Quilon), the capital of Venad. Defeated in conventional warfare, the famous warrior class of Kerala, the Nairs, formed suicide squads - Chavar - against the invaders. Numerous Kalaris (gymnasia giving training in attack and self-defence) were established, turning Kerala into one large insurgent military camp. Though the Cholas could not make enduring conquests, they did manage to smash the Chera empire and turn it into numerous, small independent principalities. The Nairs had lost huge numbers of men in battles. The Nair households, the Tharavaads totally lost it glory. The rulers also lost their economic power. Without royal patronage, the powers of the temples too declined. The king handed over the temple to the local Namboothiri Brahmins. The temples then began to be owned and managed by the Namboothiri Brahmins. So we can assume that from this time onwards the Thumpamon Sree Vadakum Nathan temple was owned by Velinikal Illom.

Break-up of joint families led to the weakening of Brahmin communities and the Nair Tharavaads. This age could be called the Dark Ages for Kerala (from late 1300 AD to early 1700 AD) - the Hindu society had created for itself the most difficult citation in the history. At this stage the Thumpamon Sree Vadkkumnatha temple also lost it glory. During this time it might have lost Vilakkumaadam, Sheevelippura, Dwaja-Sthamba (Kodimaram) etc.

== Gallery ==
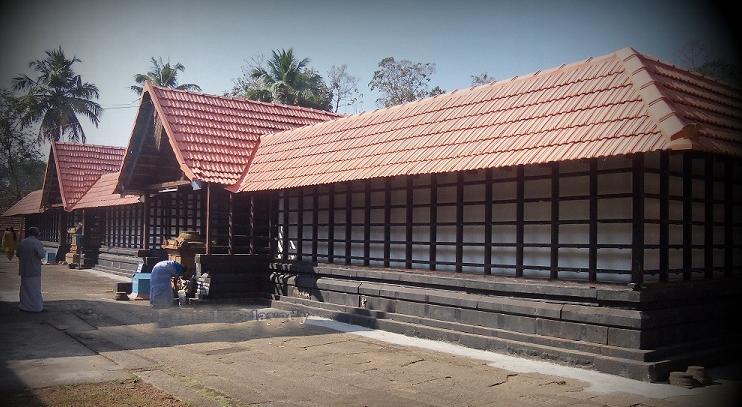
Thumpamon Vadakkumnathan Temple

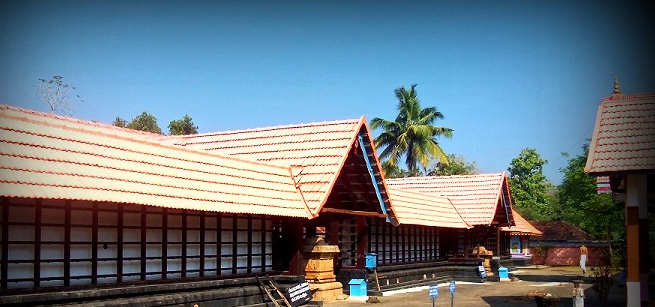
Thumpamon Vadakkumnathan Temple

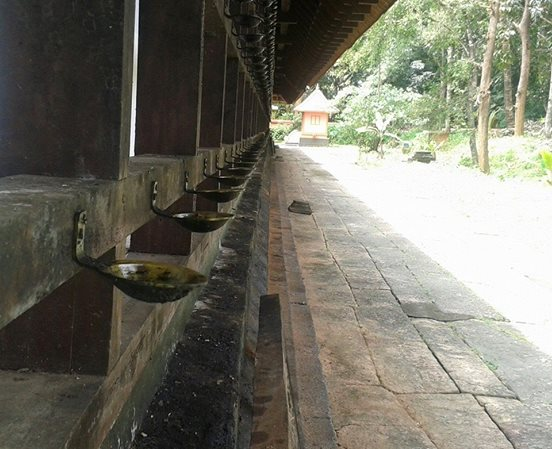
Thumpamon Vadakkumnathan Temple

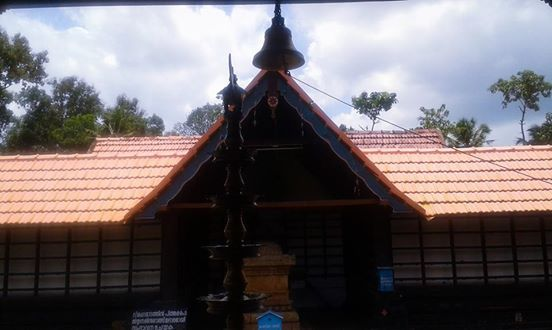
Thumpamon Vadakkumnathan Temple

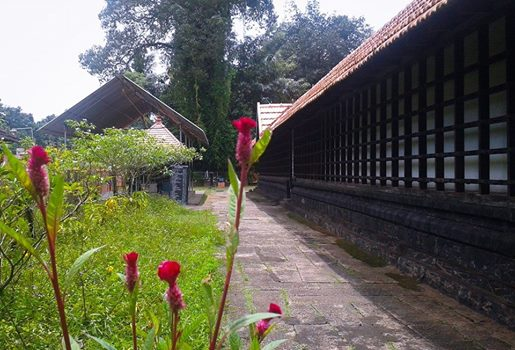
Thumpamon Vadakkumnathan Temple

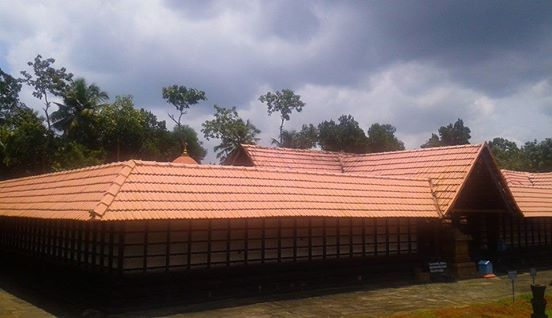
Thumpamon Vadakkumnathan Temple

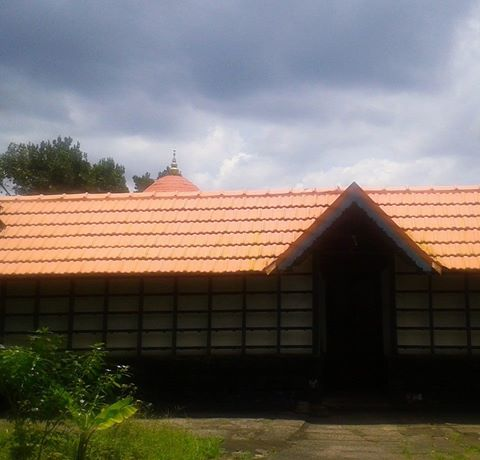
Thumpamon Vadakkumnathan Temple

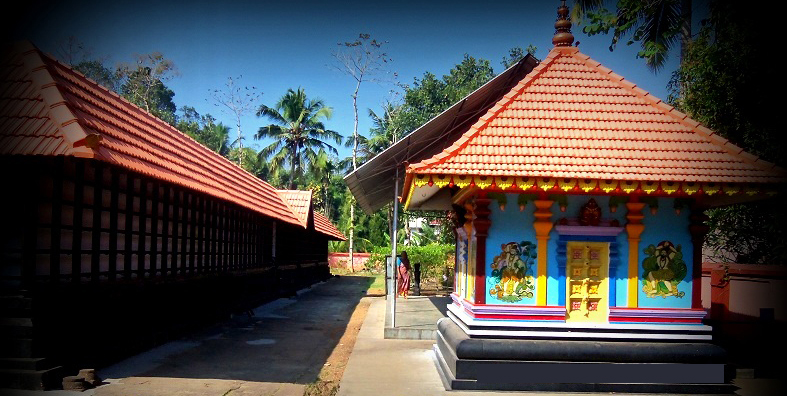
Thumpamon Vadakkumnathan Temple

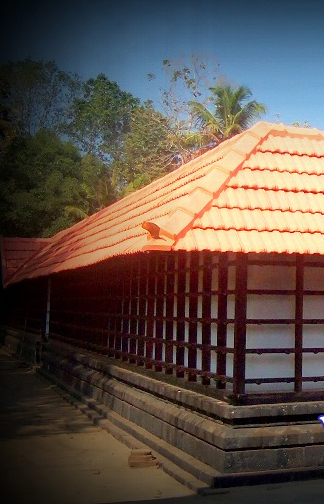
Thumpamon Vadakkumnathan Temple

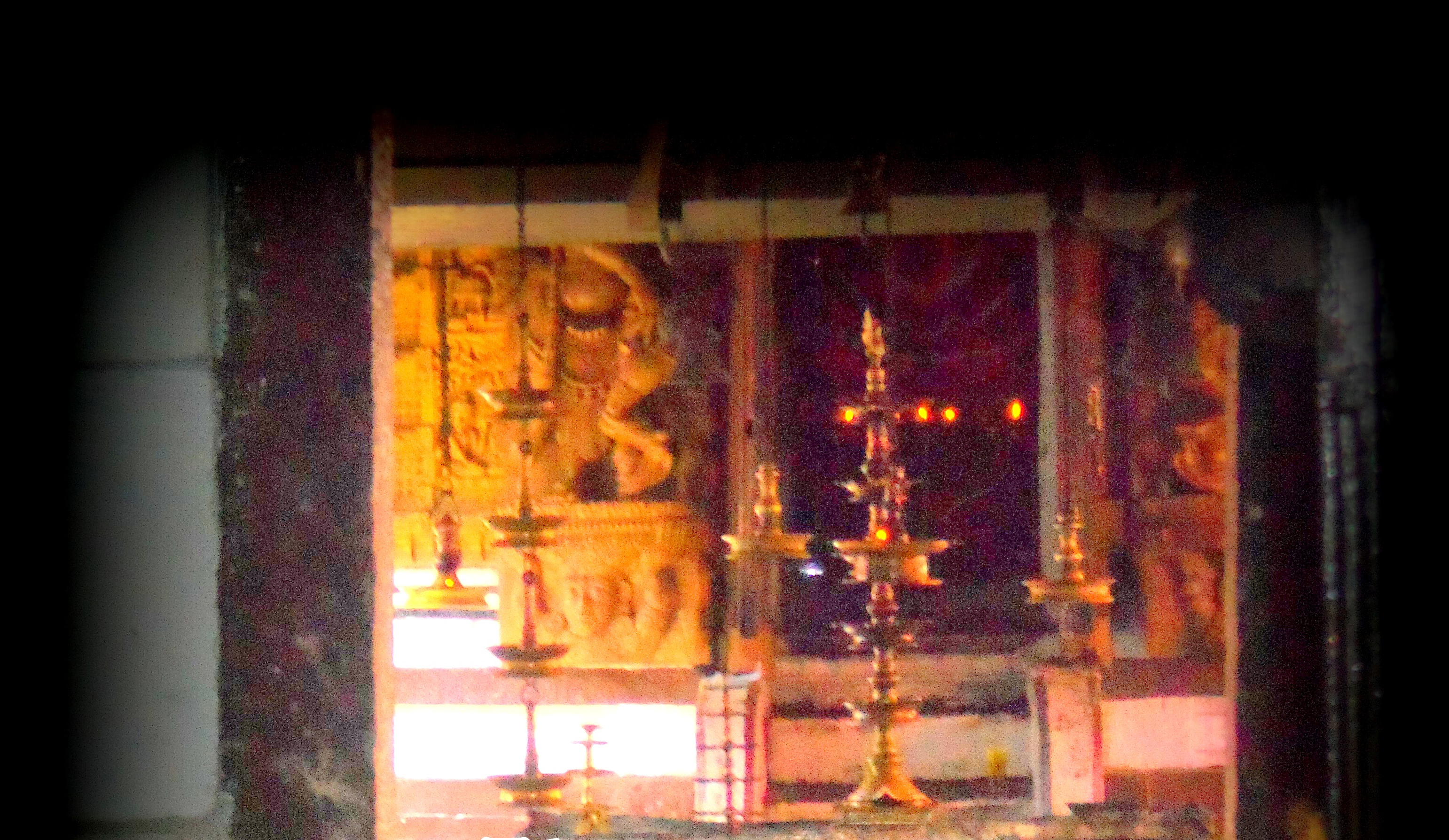
Thumpamon Vadakkumnathan Temple

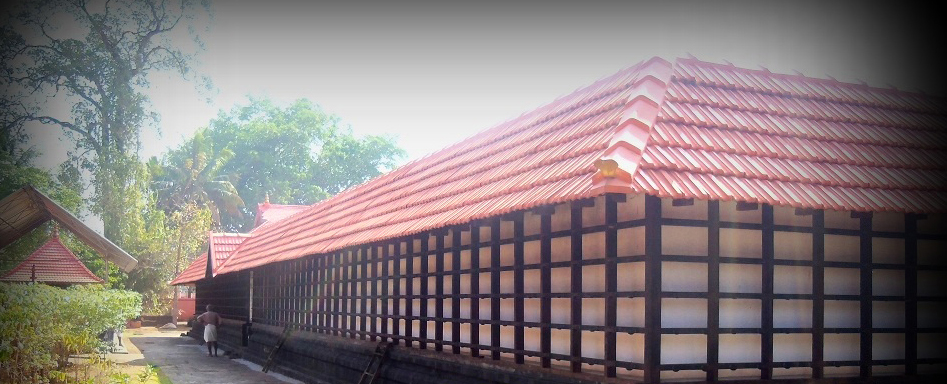
Thumpamon Vadakkumnathan Temple

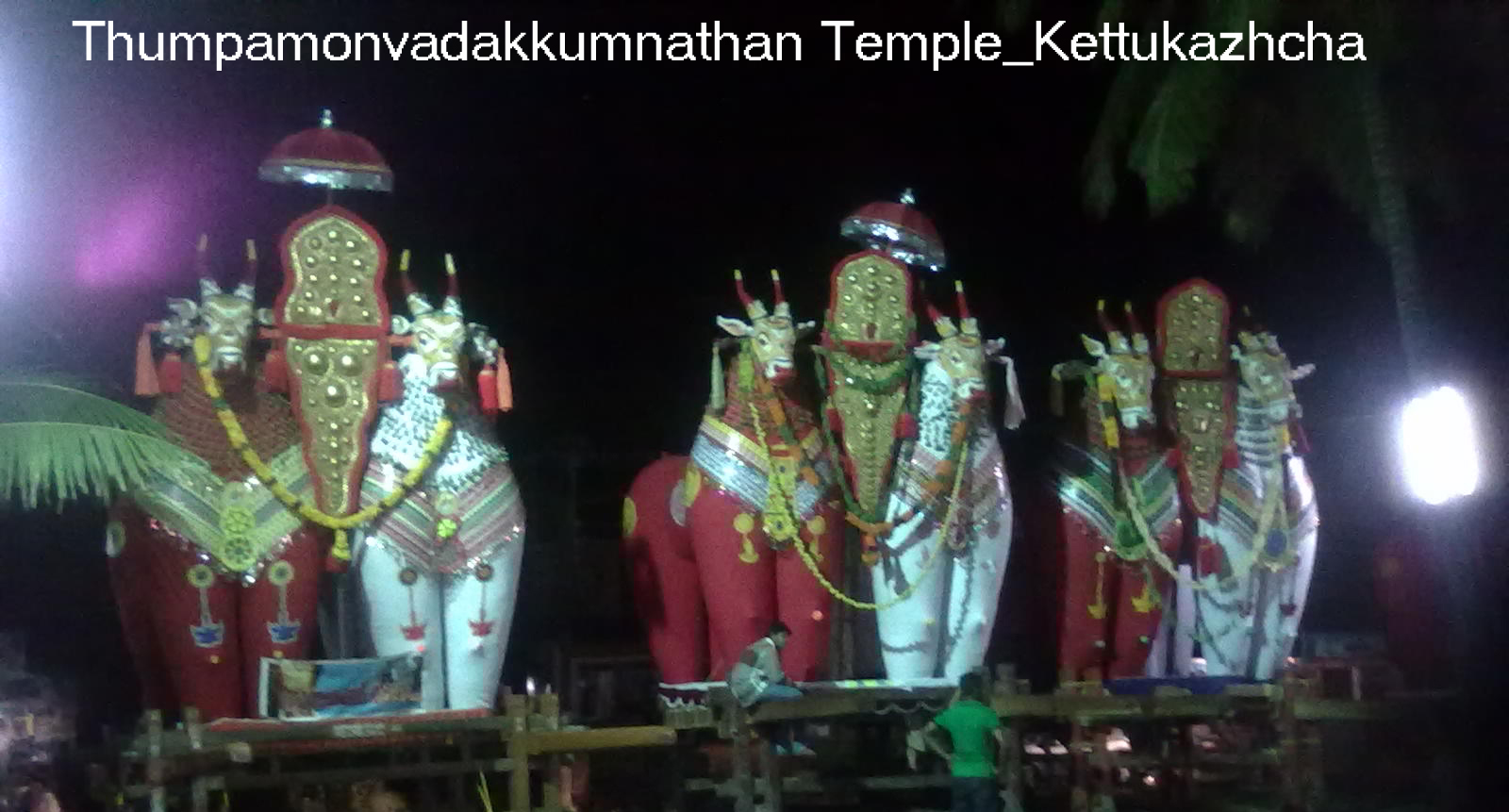
Thumpamon Vadakkumnathan Temple

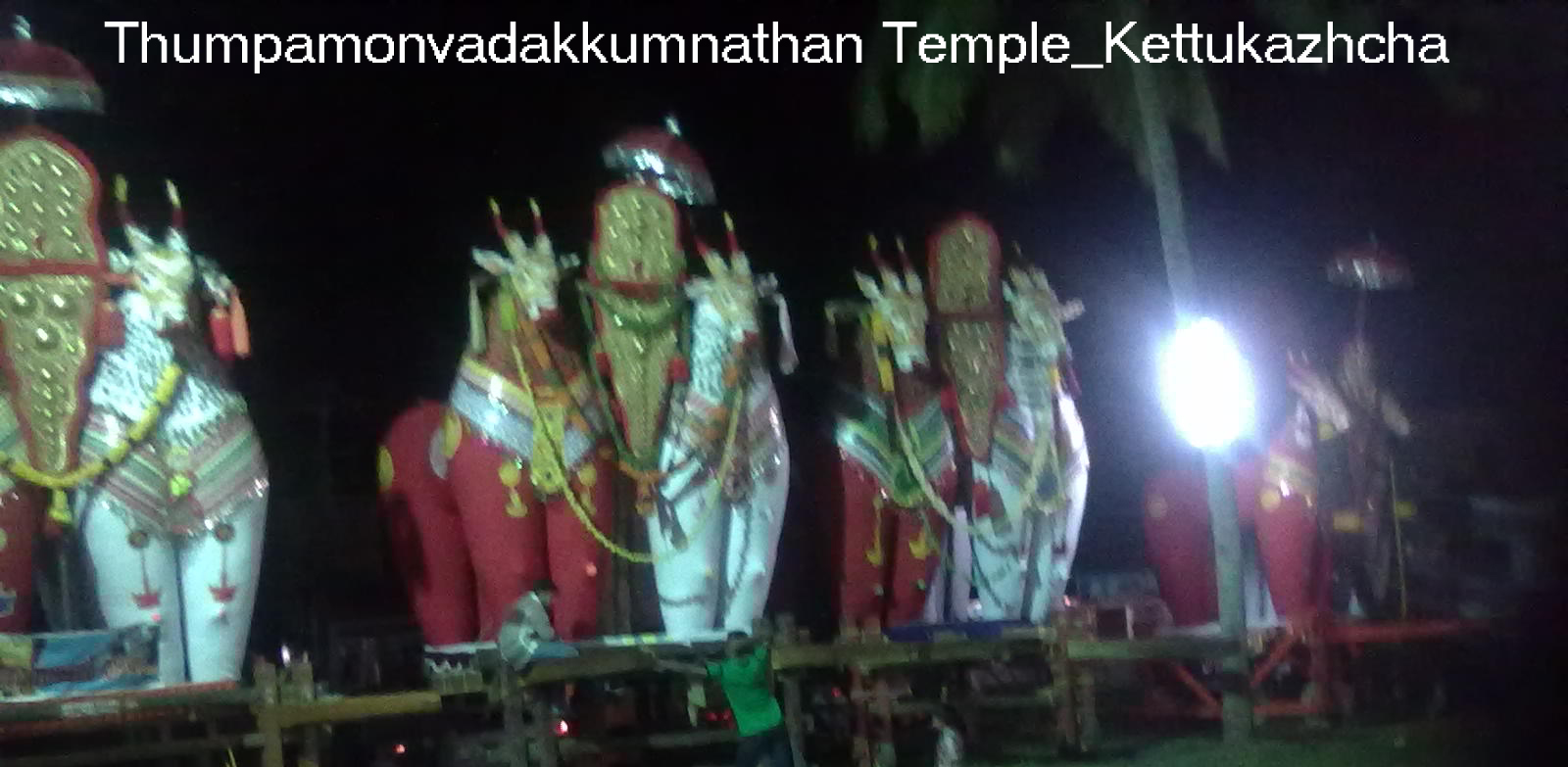
Thumpamon Vadakkumnathan Temple

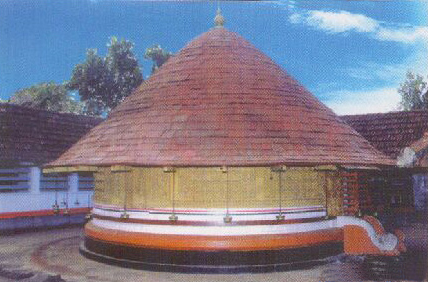
Sreekovil of Vadakkumnathan

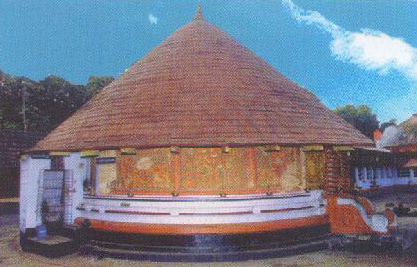
Sreekovil of Thekkumnathan

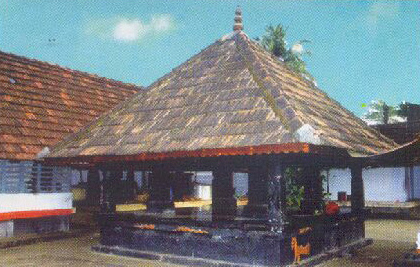
Mandapam of Vadakkumnathan

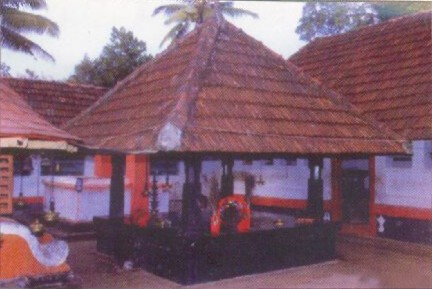
Mandapam of Thekkumnathan

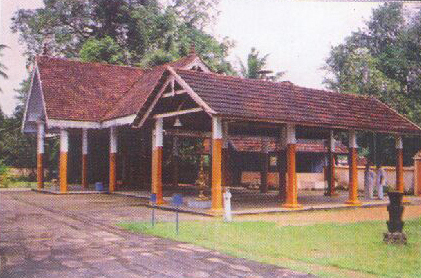
Nadapanthal of Vadakumnatha temple

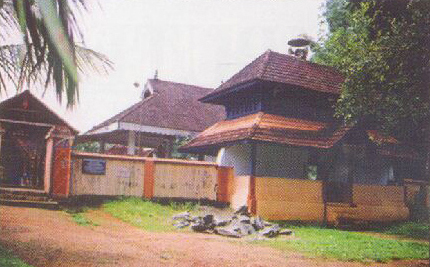
Gopuram of Vadakumnatha temple

== See also ==
- Pathanamthitta District
- Temples of Kerala
