= Kaipattoor Bridge =

Bridge in India

Coordinates: 9.23216°N 76.75319°E

Kaipattoor Bridge is a concrete bridge in Pathanamthitta, Kerala that connects Kaipattoor and Omalloor over the Achankovil River.
