= Pramadom =

Village in Kerala, India

- Village
- Country: India
- State: Kerala
- District: Pathanamthitta

Population (2011)
  - Total: 19,489

Languages
  - Official: Malayalam, English
- Time zone: UTC+5:30 (IST)
- PIN: 689646
- Vehicle registration: KL-83

Pramadom is a village in Pathanamthitta district in the state of Kerala, India.

== Demographics ==
As of 2011 India census, Pramadom had a population of 19489 with 9158 males and 10331 females. The only indoor stadium in Pathanamthitta district is in Pramadom. It was built at a cost of Rs.2 crore on 0.15 hectare of land along the Konni-Poonkavu road. The Mahadevar temple representing lord "Shiva" is also situated on the Pathanamthitta Poonkavu road.

== See also ==
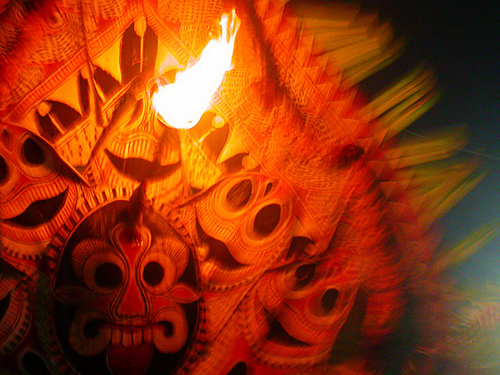
Padyani - At Thazhoor Bhagavathy Kshetram (Temple) at Vazhamuttom near Pramadom

- Pathanamthitta
- Vazhamuttom
- Thazhoor Bhagavathy Kshetram(temple)
- River Achankovil
