= Kodumthara =

- Town
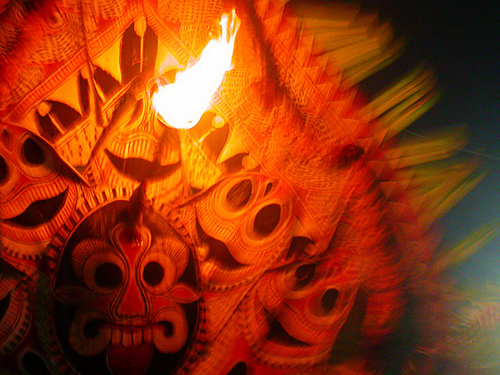
- Similar Thaipooyam can be seen at Subramanya swamy Temple at Kodumthara near Pathanamthitta

- Location in Kerala, India Kodumthara (India)
- Coordinates: 9°15′0″N 76°47′0″E
- Country: India
- State: Kerala
- District: Pathanamthitta

Languages
  - Official: Malayalam, English
- Time zone: UTC+5:30 (IST)
- PIN: 689645
- Telephone code: 0468
- Vehicle registration: KL-03
- Nearest city: Thiruvananthapuram

Kodumthara is a village just outside Pathanamthitta City Suburbs, located in Kerala state, India. . Kodumthara is only 2 km away from Pathanamthitta

The village is famous for the ancient Subrahmanya Temple.The presence of river achankovil gives fertility.

The temple is visited by devotees from various parts of Kerala.

From Pathanamthitta, one can take a public bus to Thazhoorkadavu or Vallicode Kottayam to reach Kodumthara.

Bus services are available frequently.

== See also ==
- Vazhamuttom
- Thazhoor Bhagavathy Kshetram(temple)
- Vallicode
- Pathanamthitta District
- River Achankovil
- Temples of Kerala
