= Chandanapally =

Chandanapally may refer to places in India:

- Chandanapally, Kerala, a village in Kerala state
- Chandanapally, Andhra Pradesh
