= Kadakkad =

Kadakkad Kadakkadu
- Municipal Division
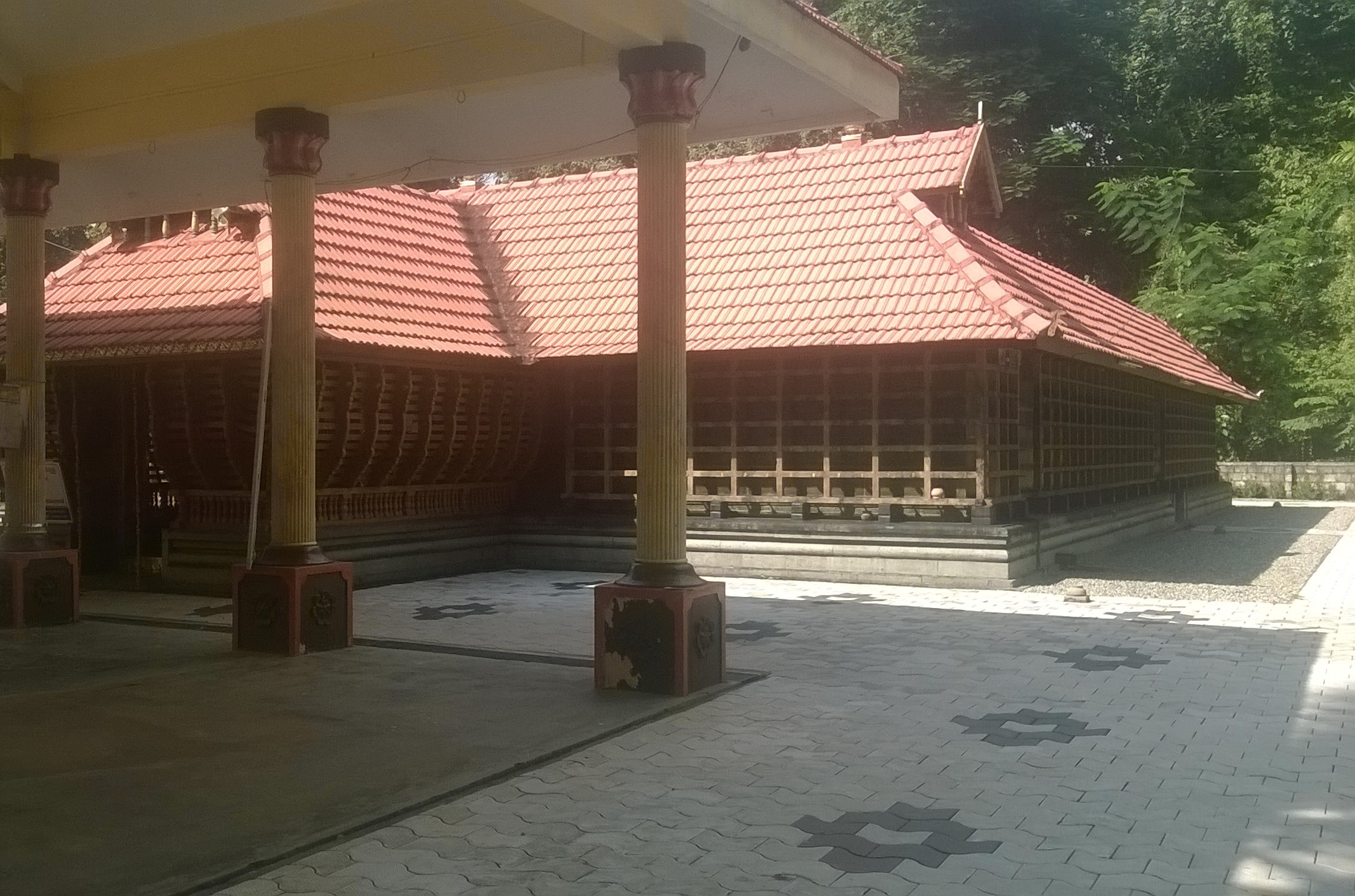
- Kadakkad Sree Bhadrakali Temple

- Location in Kerala, India Kadakkad (India)
- Coordinates: 9.22°N 76.70°E
- Country: India
- State: Kerala
- District: Pathanamthitta

Government
  - Body: Pandalam Municipality

Languages
  - Official: Malayalam
- Time zone: UTC+5:30 (IST)
- Telephone code: 04734
- Vehicle registration: KL-26
- Nearest city: Pandalam
- Lok Sabha constituency: Pathanamthitta
- Climate: Tropical monsoon (Köppen)

Kadakkad is a municipal division in Pandalam. Situated in the banks of Achankovil river; Kadakkad divided into two divisions, Kadakkad North and Kadakkad South. Pandalam-Pathanamthitta road is the major road passing and Kadakkad-Kaipattoor road proposed to be upgraded to NH standards.

== Etymology ==
The name Kadakkad derived from Kharan (An Asura inhabited this place) and Kadu (Forest).

== Places of Worship ==
- Kadakkad Sree Bhadrakali Temple
- Kadakkad Juma Masjid

== Institutions ==
- Sugarcane Seed Farm, Kadakkad.
- District Soil Testing Laboratory, Kadakkad.

== Gallery ==
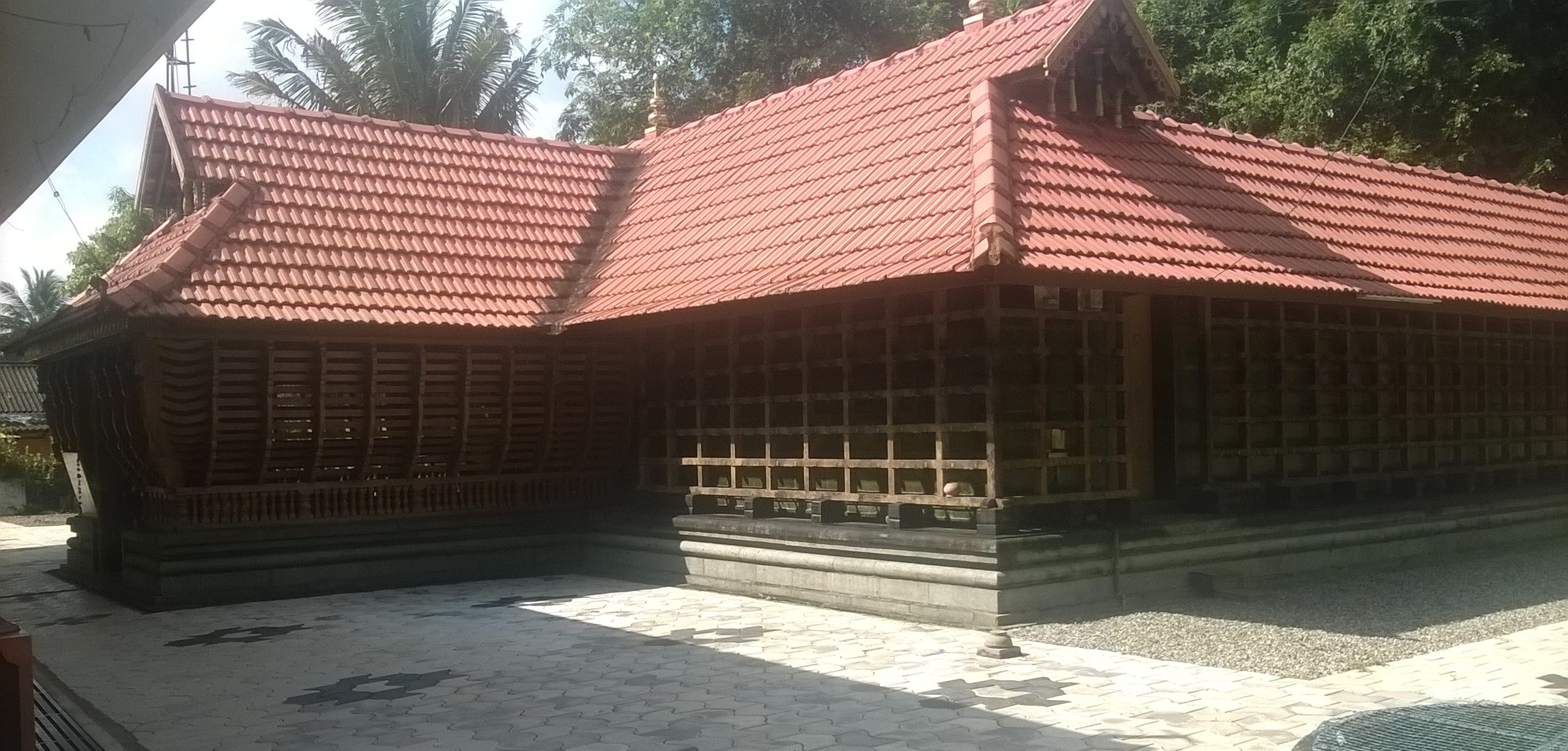
Kadakkad Sree Bhadrakali Temple
