= Nariyapuram =

- village
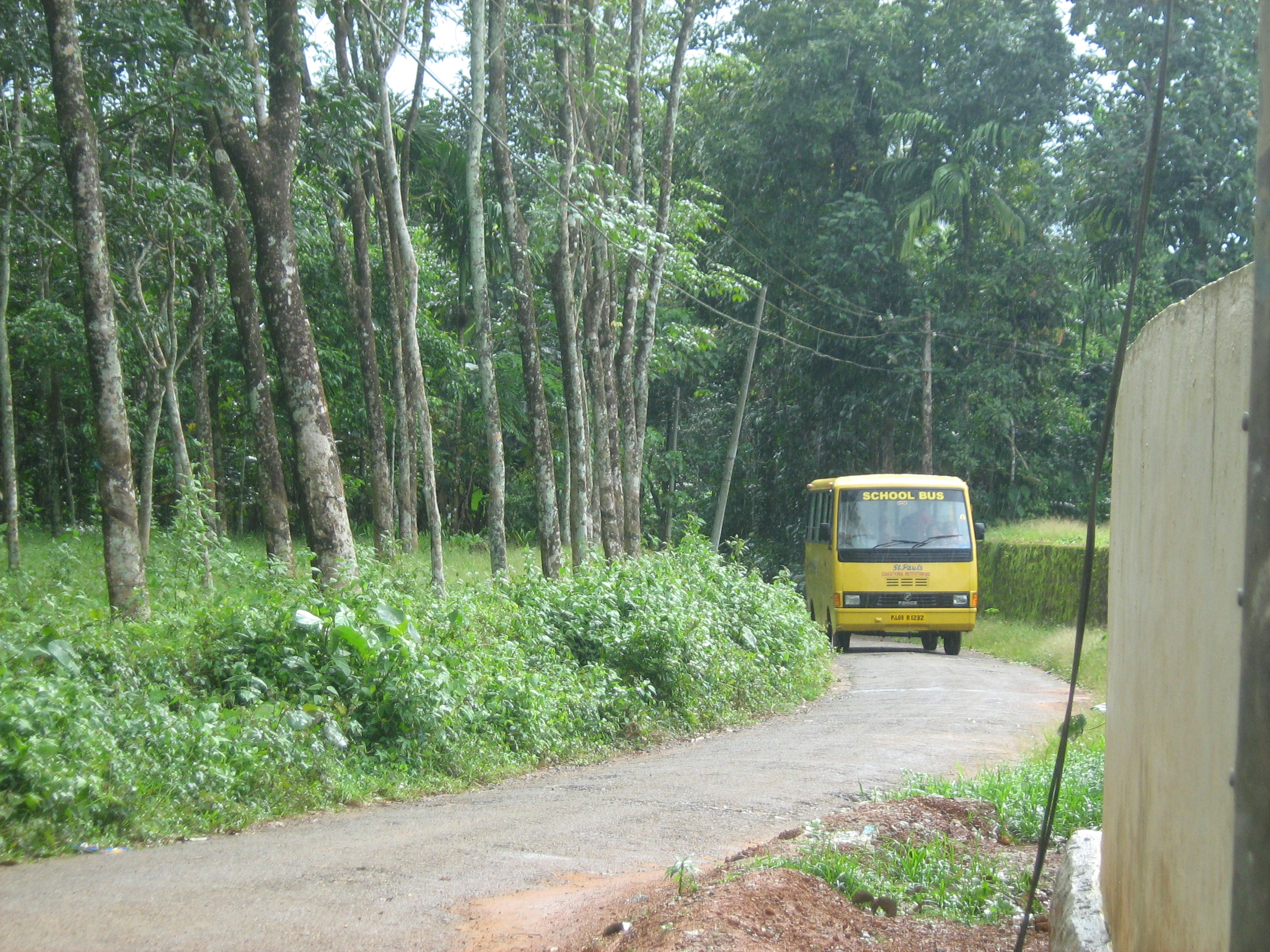
- School bus in Nariyapuram
- Interactive map of Nariyapuram
- Coordinates: 9°13′22″N 76°44′13″E
- Country: India
- State: Kerala
- District: Pathanamthitta
- Talukas: Kozhencherry

Government
  - Body: Vallicode Panchayat

Languages
  - Official: Malayalam, English
- Time zone: UTC+5:30 (IST)
- PIN: 689513
- Telephone code: 0468
- Vehicle registration: KL-03
- Coastline: 0 kilometres (0 mi)
- Nearest city: Pandalam
- Lok Sabha constituency: Pathanamthitta, MLA -Konni
- Civic agency: Vallicode Panchayat
- Climate: Tropical monsoon (Köppen)
- Avg. summer temperature: 35 °C (95 °F)
- Avg. winter temperature: 20 °C (68 °F)

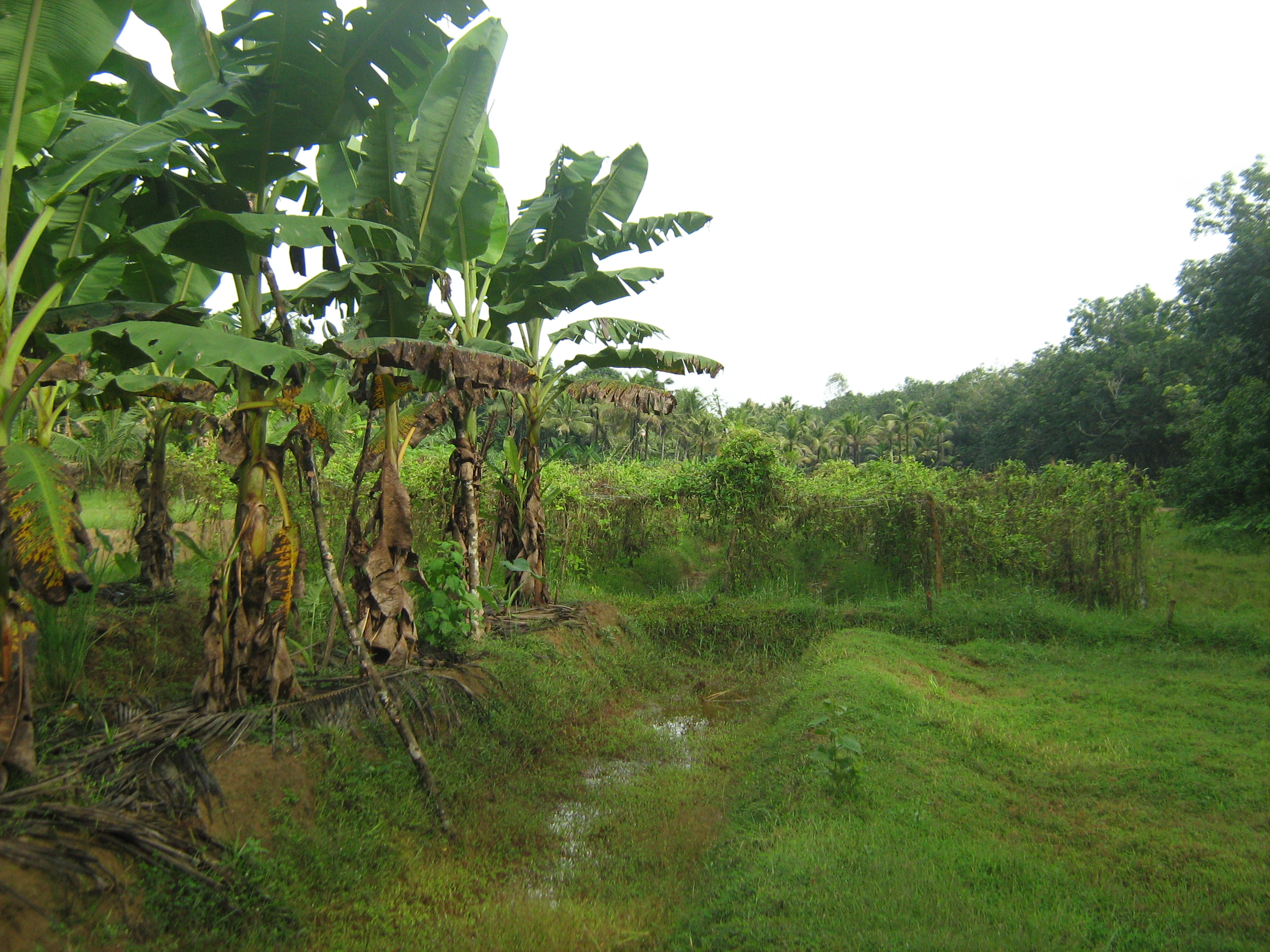
A Paddy field in Nariyapuram.

Nariyapuram is a village in Vallicode Panchayat of Pathanamthitta district in Kerala, India. Nariyapuram is located in the northern part of Pathanamthitta. Pandalam, which is seven km away is the nearest town. The district headquarters Pathanamthitta is eight km away. There are regular bus services via Nariyapuram. Schools, hospitals, places of worship and all other necessities are also available. The population here is not too large. There are vast areas of paddy fields and most of the villagers are farmers. Borders of Nariyapuram are Thattayil along the south, Thumpamon along the west, Achankovil river along the north and Kaipattoor along the east. One of the existing sugarcane cultivation in Central Travancore is in Nariyapuram.new state Highway 80 (SH-80)[Konni Haipad Road] in one junction nariyapuram.

== History ==
It is presumed that the regions that Nariyapuram was formerly under the rule of Pandalam, which had connections with the Pandya kingdom.^{[7]} When Pandalam was added to the princely state of Travancore in 1820, the region came under Travancore administration.

== Education ==
- St. Paul's school is an Aided school in Nariyapuram. For many years, it was an upper primary school. There were no high schools in Nariyapuram at that time. The school became a high school by the year of 1985. The school was founded in 1952. Most people in and around Nariyapuram had their schooling at this school. Currently, the school follows CBSE syllabus up to fourth grade, Kerala State Education Board for fifth to tenth standard and the school has an unaided higher secondary. The founder manager of the school is Shri. K T Mathai
- GLPS Nariyapuram
- GLPS Vayala north
- MSC LPS Nariyapuram
- GURUKULAM CAREER GUIDANCE CENTRE

== Religion ==
The main religious communities in Nariyapuram are Hindus and Christians.

=== Shri Indilayappan Temple ===
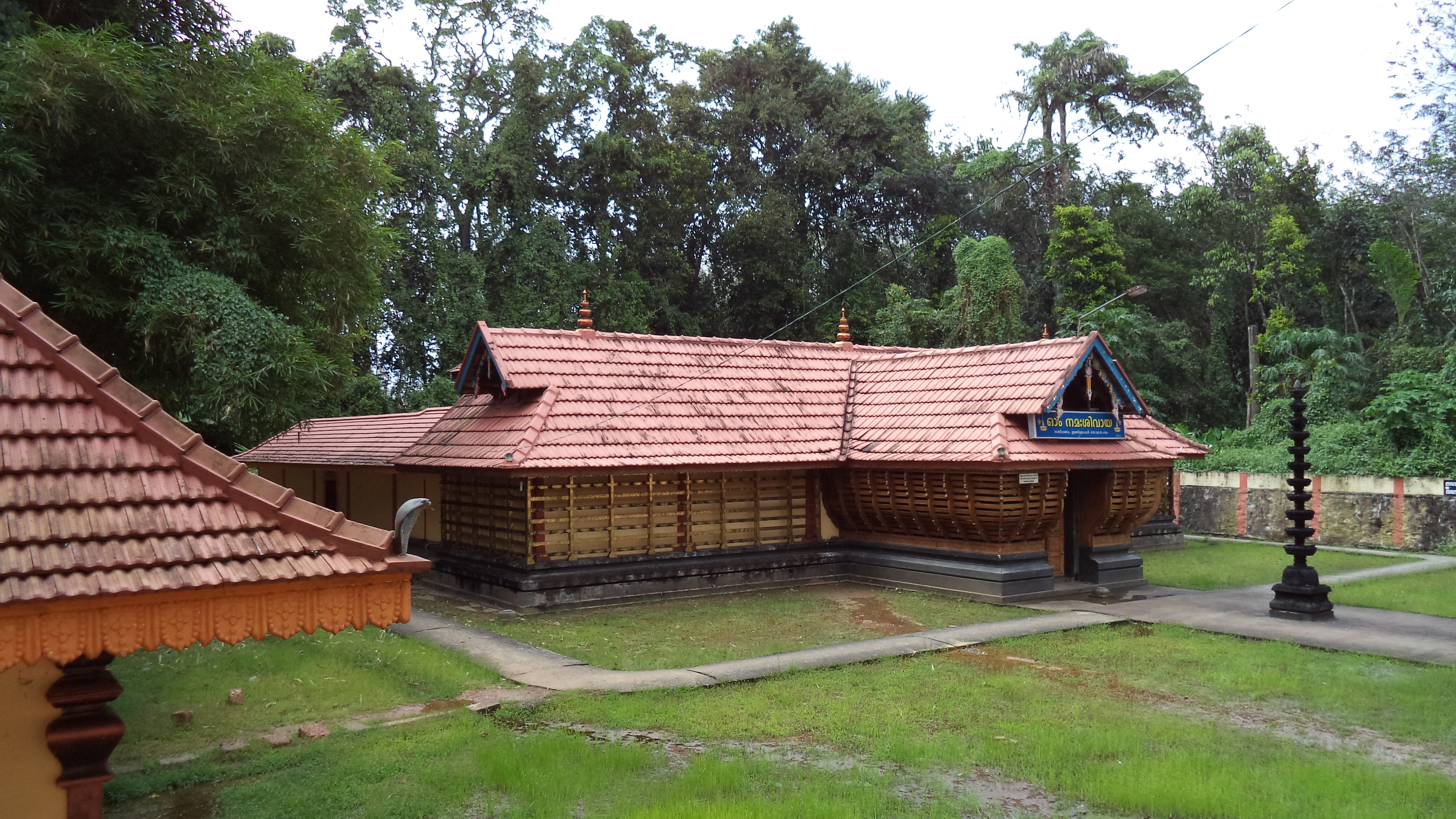
Indilayappan temple

Shri Indilayappan temple, Nariyapuram is one of the oldest and famous temples in Kerala, India. The temple is the abode of Lord Indilayappan the incarnation of two divine powers of Lord Shiva and Lord Dharma Shasta. Situated in the backdrop of scenic beauty and adorned by sacred Grove, all weather clear water ponds and vast evergreen meadow, the temple is an embodiment of serenity and peace. Seated in the lap of Mother Nature, the deity is in the form of a naturally grown Black Rock. The deity has free access to sunlight, air, rain, mist and dew. This is made possible by leaving the overhead portion of the Sreekovil open.

=== Immanuel Orthodox Valiya Pally ===
Immanuel Orthodox Valiya Pally, Nariyapuram is an ancient and famous church in Nariyapuram. Years ago before the church was built, people in Nariyapuram used to go to Thumpamon Valiya Pally. Then Christian believers in Nariyapuram realised that a separate church is required for Nariyapuram and this led to the construction of a new church in Nariyapuram. Today Immanuel Orthodox Valiya Pally, Nariyapuram is one of the biggest churches in Pathanamthitta.

=== Assemblies of God Church ===
It is famous pentecostal church located in this village.

=== Madathilkavil Sree Vanadurga Devi Temple ===
This temple is recently renovated and situated 300 meters east to Nariyapuram Junction .

=== Sree vadakkumnatha Kshetharam ===
Sree vadakkumnatha temple or Aalthara (ആൽത്തറ) Temple situated north to Nariyapuram in banks of Achankovil River, Lord Shiva and Lord Muruga are the deities of the temple. The Temple was renovated in 1999 by building a new temple where the old banyan tree situated, under which the deity was situated.

== Market ==
One market was situated near Nariyapuram junction opposite to Government LP school up to beginning of last decade and is now defunct.

== Important Institutions ==
=== Nariyapuram Milk producers Co-operative Society ===
A Milk producers co-operative society in Nariyapuram collects the milk from the farmers and assuring a steady market and stable price to dairy farmers for the milk produced by them.

=== Sugar cane Mill ===
A sugar cane mill situated near Charuvayyathu padi produce jaggery using sugar cane cultivated near it. This is one of the few existing sugar cane cultivation in District.

== Agriculture ==
Most common crop in this area is Rubber. Paddy is the most important crop cultivated in the wet lands. Tapioca and pulses are the important dry land crops. Other major crops are coconut, banana, pepper and ginger. In certain areas cashew, pineapple, sugarcane, cocoa and other tree spices are cultivated.

=== SBT ===
The State Bank of Travancore Nariyapuram branch is situated in Parambil Buildings at Nariyapuram Junction. The bank has a key role in fulfilling the financial needs of people in Nariyapuram. The bank has its own ATM counter which is very useful for people not only in Nariyapuram but also in nearby places.

=== Kaipattoor Service Co-Operative Bank ===
The Nariyapuram branch of Kaipattoor Service Co-Operative bank is a great support for people in Nariyapuram. The bank opens special market during the Onam festival. The bank provides many services useful to ordinary people.

== Transport ==
The Pandalam - Kaipattoor road passes through Nariyapuram. This road joins MC Road at Pandalam and thereby makes it convenient to travel to all the major cities in Kerala, including the state capital Trivandrum and commercial capital Kochi. To the other side, the road leads to Kaipattoor from where we can get to Adoor, Ezhamkulam, Konni or Pathanamthitta where Pathanamthitta is the district capital. Nearest airports are Trivandrum International Airport and Cochin International Airport . Nearest Railway stations are Chengannur, *Thiruvalla, Mavelikkara and Haripad.

== Famous Personalities ==
- P. Ayyaneth
- S. Jithesh
- KK. Gopalakrishnan Nair
- Nariyapuram Venugopal
- Dr. K P Kesavan Nampoothiri

Dr Bejoy P George Robotic Joint Replacement Surgeon and Sports Medicine Specialist.
