= Samuel Chandanappally =

Indian writer, college professor and orator

Samuel Chandanapally
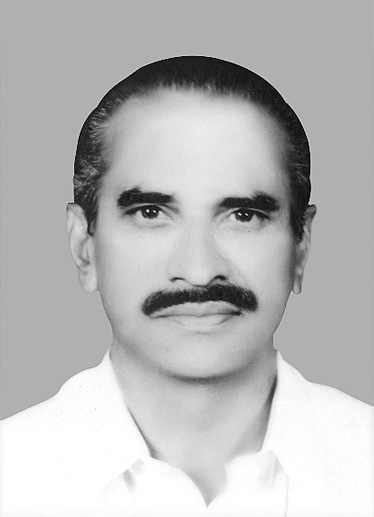
- Born: 13 May 1940; Chandanapally, Kerala, India
- Died: 3 July 2000 (aged 60); Ernakulam, Kerala
- Resting place: St. George Orthodox Church, Chandanapally
- Education: MA, Ph.D., D.Litt.
- Occupation: College Professor, Writer and Orator
- Spouse: Gracy
- Children: Reji, Roy, Reena
- Parent(s): Geevarghese Daniel, Kunjamma

Samuel Chandanappally (13 May 1940 – 3 July 2000), who was born C. D. Samuel, was an Indian writer, college professor and orator.

In his lifetime, he wrote around 30 books in Malayalam. His book titled Malankara Sabha Pithakkanmar, contains the study about the writings of the holy fathers of the Malankara Orthodox Syrian Church community and is considered a reference text.

Dr. Samuel Chandanappally collected most of the writings of Saint Gregorios of Parumala after a long period of research and published them with the title Holy writings (Pavithra Rachanakal) in 1980.

He worked as a professor at the Catholicate College, Pathanamthitta and received an UGC grant for research work 1969.
