= Thattayil Orippurathu Bhagavathi Temple =

Hindu temple in Kerala, India

Orippurathu Bhagavathy Temple
- ഒരിപ്പുറത്തു ഭഗവതി ക്ഷേത്രം
- Orippurathu Bhagavathy Temple, Thattayil, Pathanamthitta, Kerala

Religion
- Affiliation: Hinduism
- District: Pathanamthitta
- Deity: Parashakti, Bhadrakaali

Location
- Location: Thattayil
- State: Kerala
- Country: India
- Interactive map of Orippurathu Bhagavathy Temple
- Coordinates: 9.209824°N 76.735457°E

Architecture
- Type: Traditional Kerala style

Specifications
- Temple: One
- Elevation: 40.1 m (132 ft)

Orippurathu Bhagavathy Temple (Malayalam: ഒരിപ്പുറത്തു ഭഗവതി ക്ഷേത്രം) is a 1200 year old ancient Hindu temple in Thattayil, near Adoor in Pathanamthitta in Kerala. It is one of the most famous Bhagavathi temples in Central Travancore. The main deity of the temple is Goddess Kali. Sub deities include Lord Ganesha, Lord Krishna, Naga Rajav, Naga Yakshi, Rekshassu, Yogeeshwaran, Yakshi Amma and Madan Swamy. Orippurathu Bhagavathi Temple is situated at about 7 km from Pandalam and 12 km from Pathanamthitta. It is located at 2 km from National Highway 183A.

As a part of the annual festival in this temple, 'Thookkam' offering is held here.

== See also ==
- Thattayil
- Pathanamthitta District
- Pandalam
- Ezhamkulam
- Vallicode
- Nariyapuram
