= Kadammanitta =

- Village
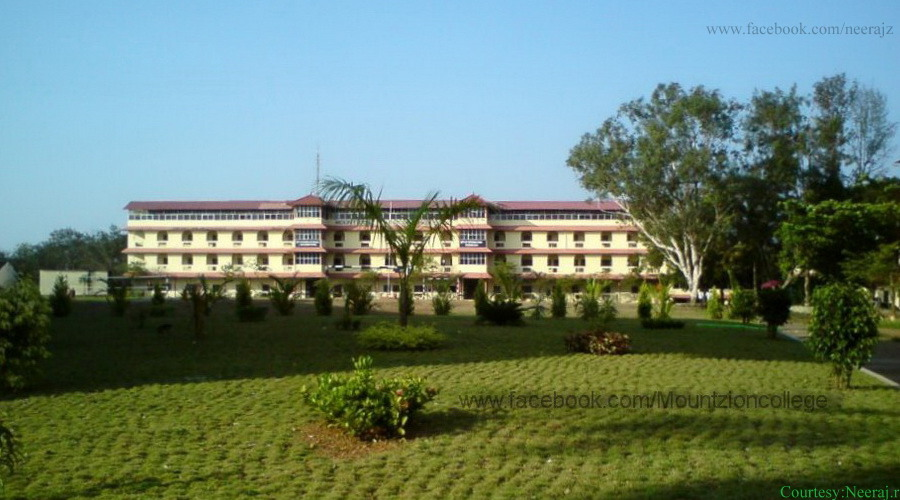
- Mountzion college of engineering Kadammanitta

- Location in Kerala, India Kadammanitta (India)
- Coordinates: 9°18′0″N 76°46′0″E
- Country: India
- State: Kerala
- District: Pathanamthitta
- Panchayat: Naranganam
- Block: Elanthoor
- Named for: Kadammanitta padayani

Languages
  - Official: Malayalam, English
- Time zone: UTC+5:30 (IST)
- PIN: 689649
- Telephone code: 0468
- Vehicle registration: KL-03
- Nearest city: Pathanamthitta
- Lok Sabha constituency: Aranmula
- Climate: Cool Climate (Köppen)

Kadammanitta is a village in Pathanamthitta District, Kerala, India which is famous for Padayani.

== See also ==
- Padayani
- Vazhamuttom
- Thazhoor Bhagavathy Kshetram
- kadammanittapally
