= Thrippara Shiva Kshetram =

Building in Kerala, India

Coordinates: 9°13′43″N 76°45′41″E

Thrippara Shiva Kshetram is a famous Shiva temple in Vallicode village, Pathanamthitta District, Kerala, India. This temple is located on the banks of the Achankovil river. The main sanctum sanctorum here is situated in the open directly above the temple ghats. This makes it a bit different from other temples in this area. The temple has a history dating back to 800 years.

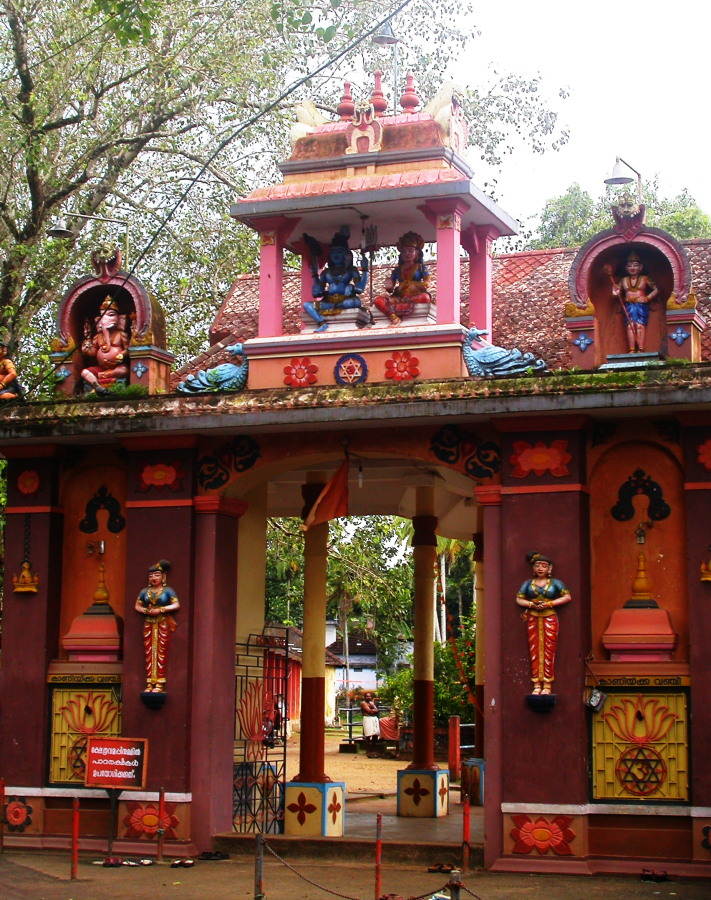
The entrance to Thrippara Shiva Kshetram

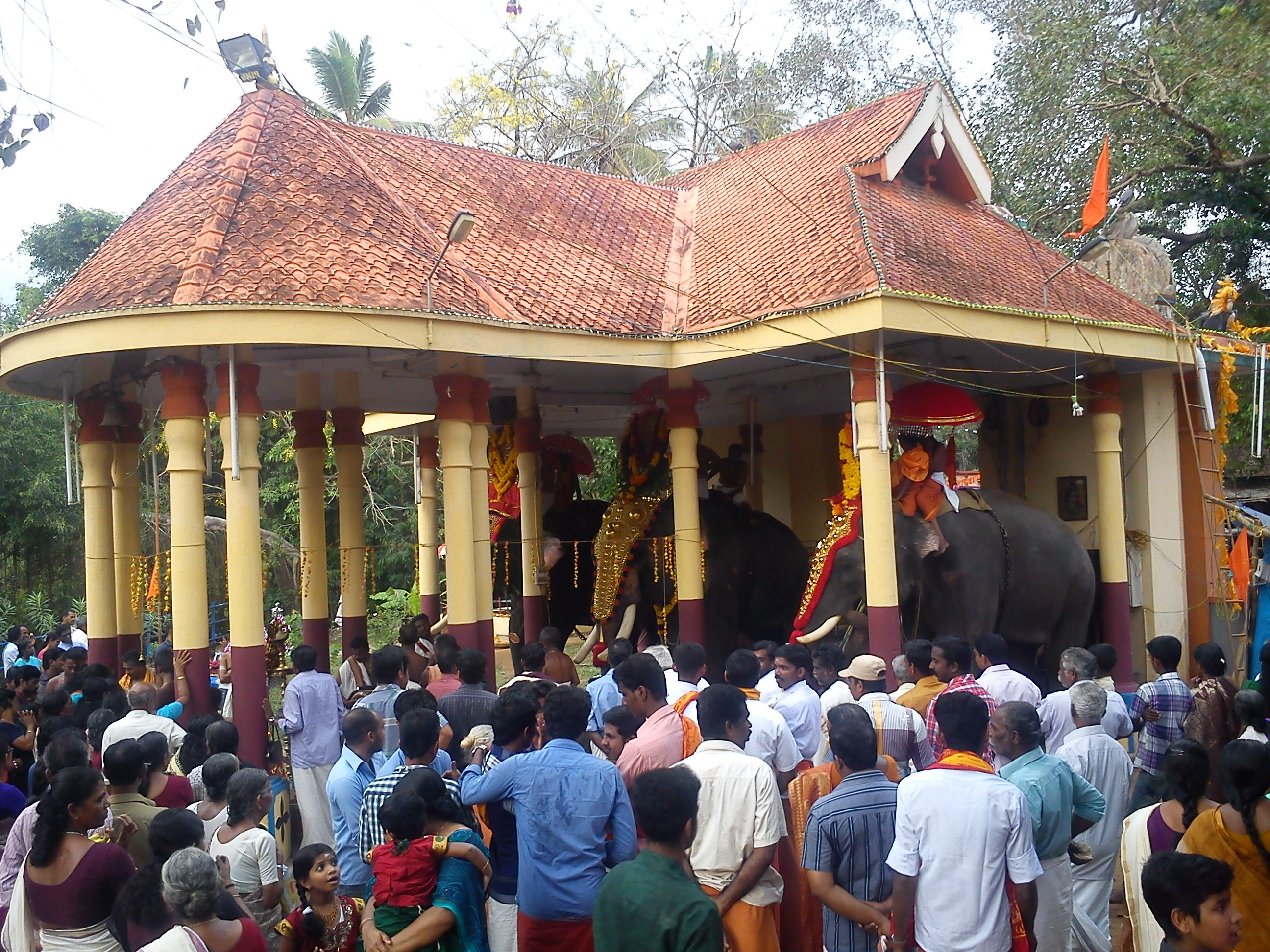
shivarathri uthsavam

== See also ==
- Temples of Kerala
- Pathanamthitta District
- Thazhoor Bhagavathy Kshetram
