= St. John's Orthodox Church, Kadammanitta =

St. John's Orthodox Church, Kadammanitta Malankara Orthodox Church Kadammanittapally
- Church
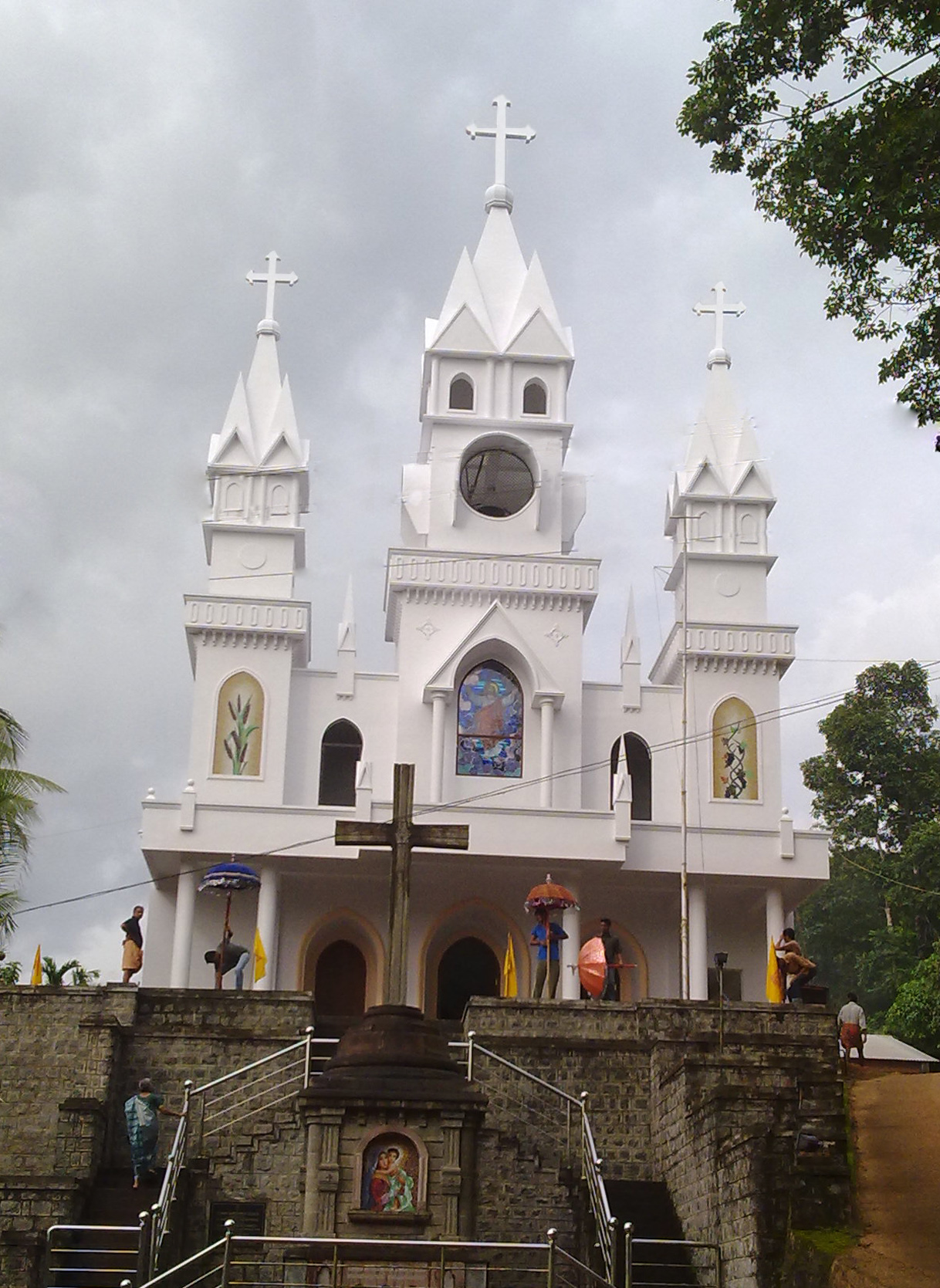
- Nickname: Kadammanitta pally
- Interactive map of St. John's Orthodox Church, Kadammanitta
- Coordinates: 9°18′0″N 76°46′0″E
- Country: India
- State: Kerala
- District: Pathanamthitta
- Panchayat: Naranganam
- Established: unknown

Government
  - Vicar: Rev. Fr. Sam K Daniel
- Website: kadammanittapally.com

Kadammanittapally (also known as St. John's Orthodox Church) in Kadammanitta, Kerala, India, is a church in the Thumpamon Diocese of the Malankara Orthodox Syrian Church, named after St John the Baptist. Sacred footprints of Geevarghese Mar Gregorios of Parumala are claimed to be in the parish.
