= Vazhamuttom =

- village
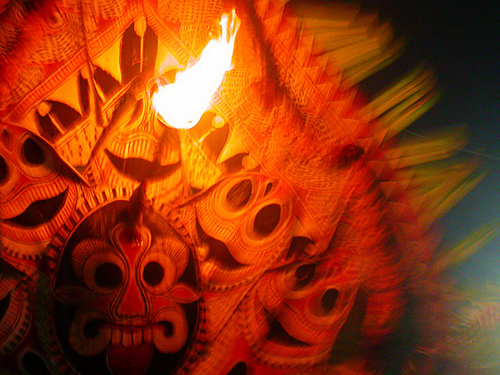
- Thullal Festival
- Interactive map of Vazhamuttom
- Coordinates: 9.27°N 76.78°E
- Country: India
- State: Kerala
- District: Pathanamthitta
- Elevation: 19 m (62 ft)

Languages
  - Official: Malayalam, English
- Time zone: UTC+5:30 (IST)
- PIN: 689646

Vazhamuttom is a village township near the Pathanamthitta Town in Pathanamthitta District, Kerala, India. River Achankovil split Vazhamuttom into two parts West Vazhamuttom and East Vazhamuttom. Thazhoor Kadavu Palam (bridge) connect both places together near Thazhoor Temple.

== Thazhoor Bhagavathy Temple ==
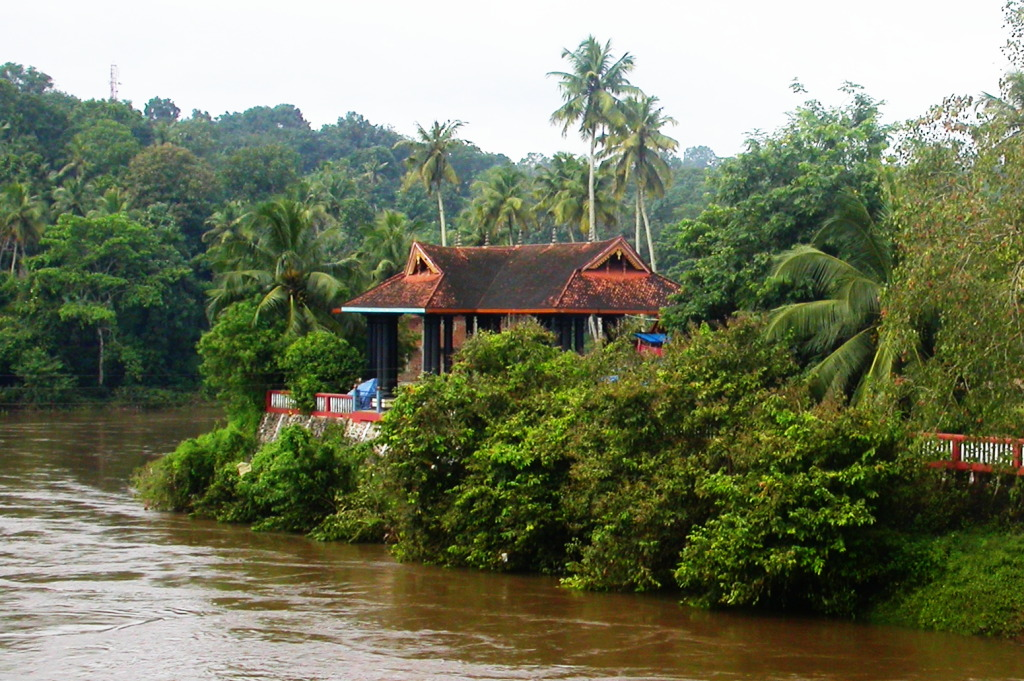
Thazhoor Bhagavathy Temple - View from Thazhoor bridge

Vazhamuttom is famous for the ancient Thazhoor Bhagavathy Kshetram(temple). "Padayani" performances are held at the temple annually. Padayani songs are very ancient folklore of Kerala.

== Churches ==
There are three Christian churches in Vazhamuttom namely, Mar Bahanan Orthodox Valyapally, St. Bahanan Malankara Syrian Catholic Church and St. Mary's Jacobite church famous for their Perunal. These Perunals are celebrated every year during December by the Bahanan churches and in January by the Jacobite church. The Oldest church among these churches is the Mar Bahanan Orthodox Valyapally, whose foundation stone was laid by the Parumala Thirumani.

== Government UP School ==
This is the oldest school in Vazhamuttom. Many generations of students have studied at this fully Malayalam medium school. When assembly and parliament election were held in Kerala, voters came and cast their votes in peace and brotherhood, in this school. Excellent students from this school are not only in other districts of Kerala, but also in USA, Germany and other parts of the world. Various doctors, engineers, teachers, nurses, army/navy/air force officers and soldiers spread across the world are the result of the dedication of the teachers from this school to the education in this village.

== Folk dances ==
The padayani folk-dances are traditionally preserved in this part of Kerala. The word padayani literally means military formations or rows of army, but in this folk art we have mainly a series of divine and semi-divine impersonations wearing huge masks or kolams of different shapes, colours and designs painted on the stalks of arecanut fronds. The Padayani is dedicated to the Goddess Bhadrakaali. The Padayani is a marvellous combination of music, dance, painting and satire. The Padayani is conducted during the Malayalam Calendar months of Kumbham, Meenam and Medam (The English months of February, March and April). The temple is located on the banks of River Achankovil, with doors opening to the river.

== Access ==
The district capital, Pathanamthitta which is 4 km away is well connected to all major towns and cities of India. Vazhamuttom is connected to Pathanamthitta, Konni, Adoor & Pandalam by large number of privately operated public buses. Buses from Pathanamthitta Town to Vallicode Kottayam (V-Kottayam) ply through Vazhamuttom on a regular interval of 30 minutes. One can reach there by buses operating in Konni - Pandalam and Konni - Adoor route, too.

== Other attractions ==
The Vazhamuttom Shree Mahavishnu temple in Vazhamuttom East is believed to be built by the King of Pandalam. Apart from this there are five Christian churches in Vazhamuttom. Two of these churches are located at the area on the east bank of Achankovil river and two on the west. Mar Bahanan Valiyapally is the oldest church in Vazhamuttom West which was established in the year 1893. The church foundation stone was laid by Parumala Thirumeny. Another important holy place called Kanjirappara (Lord Shiva) is situated 1.5 km away from Shree Mahavishnu temple.

== Geography ==
Vazhamuttom is located on the banks of River Achankovil. Vazhamuttom is the meeting point of Chandanapally-Konni Road, Pathanamthitta-Thazhoorkadavu Road and Omallur-Thazhoorkadavu Road. Pathanamthitta-Thazhoorkadavu Road serves as a parallel road to Kaipattoor - Pathanamthitta Road. We can reach Kaipattoor via Mayalil. It helps to avoid the busiest Kaipattoor - Pathanamthitta Road and one can reach Kaipattoor Kadav Junction and can turn left to reach Adoor via Thatta and Anandapally and reaching MC road to continue to the State Capital Thiruvananthapuram.

== See also ==
- Kaipattoor
- Padayani
- Temples of Kerala
- River Achankovil
- Vallicode
- Pathanamthitta
- Omallur
- Kadammanitta
