= Sree Rakthakanda Swamy Temple (Omalloor Temple) =

- Location in Kerala

Religion
- Affiliation: Hinduism
- District: Pathanamthitta
- Deity: Rakthakanda Swamy (Shasta)

Location
- Location: Omallur
- State: Kerala
- Country: India
- Interactive map of Sree Rakthakanda Swamy Temple
- Coordinates: 9°14′59.09″N 76°45′30.35″E

Architecture
- Type: Dravidian architecture

Rakthakanda Swamy Temple, Omallur, Pathanamthitta District, known as "Omallur Temple" traces its history to the 8th century AD. It is a pilgrim centre on the way to Sabarimala from Pandalam, the birthplace of Sree Ayyappan. The Temple is famous for its annual festival of 10 days in the month of Medom of Malayalam Era. The 10-day festival is celebrated by 10 Karayogams (village communities) in and around Omallur. During the festival days, there is a customary Arattu procession to the river Achenkovil. More than 10 elephants decorated with Nettipattom (a decorated cover on the forehead) will be a speciality of this Arattu. The Temple has a Golden Flag Staff erected in the year 1952 AD. Omallur is 4 km south from the district headquarters Pathanamthitta and 11 km from MC Road (Kottayam - Trivandrum route). Omallur Temple has many interesting stone carvings. Kallunadasvaram (Nadasvaram made up of stone) and Kalchangala (chain made by stone) are two among them.

== History ==
The History of the temple is related to the village named Kalleli near to the konni Town. From the kalleli, the main deity was thrown to the river achankovil by the local people due to their failure in the game Choothu (a traditional game played by the kerala people).

== See also ==
- Omalloor
- Temples of Kerala
- Pathanamthitta District

== Image gallery ==
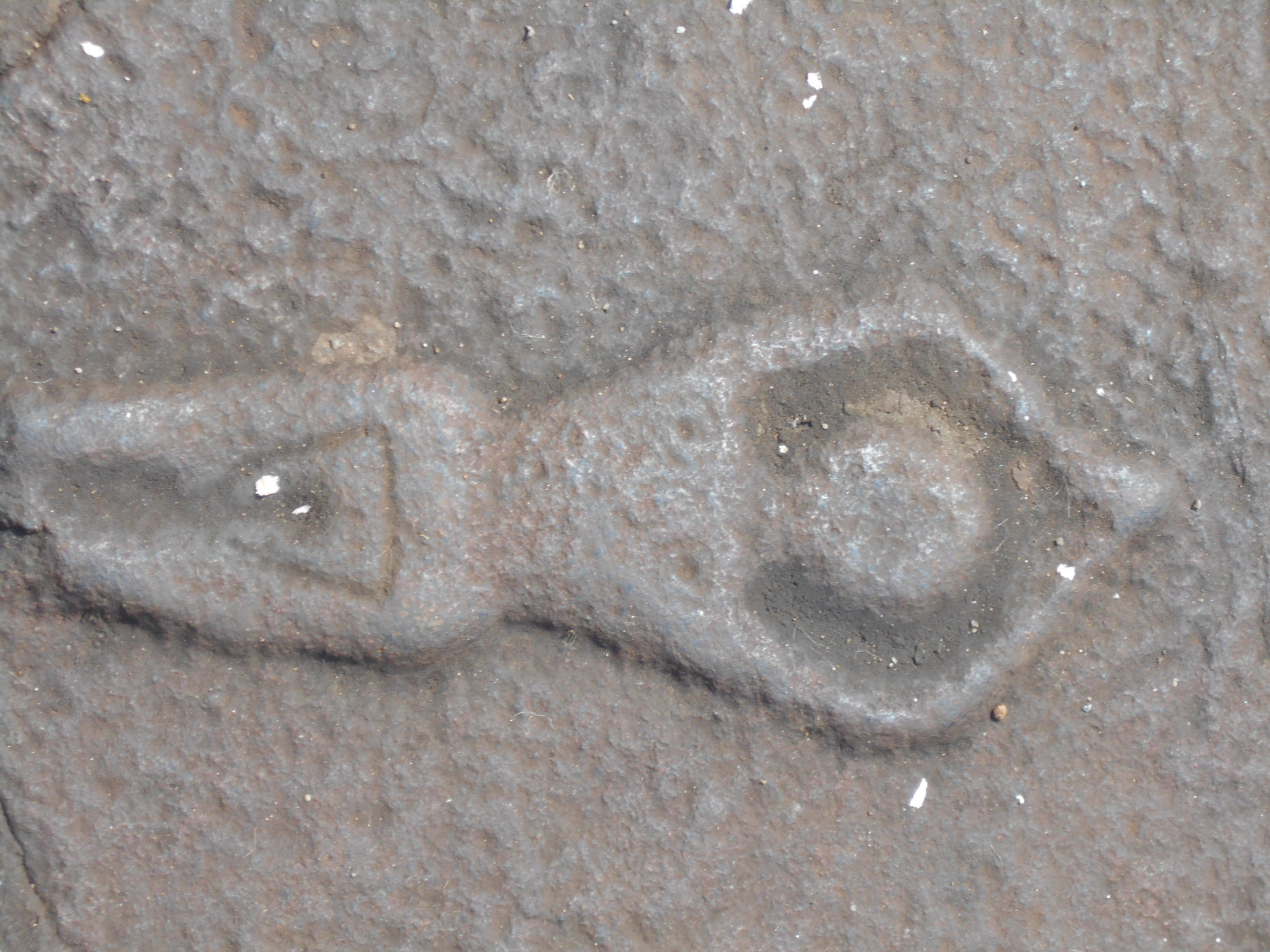
Ancient engraving depicting a man on stone pavement pathway in temple.

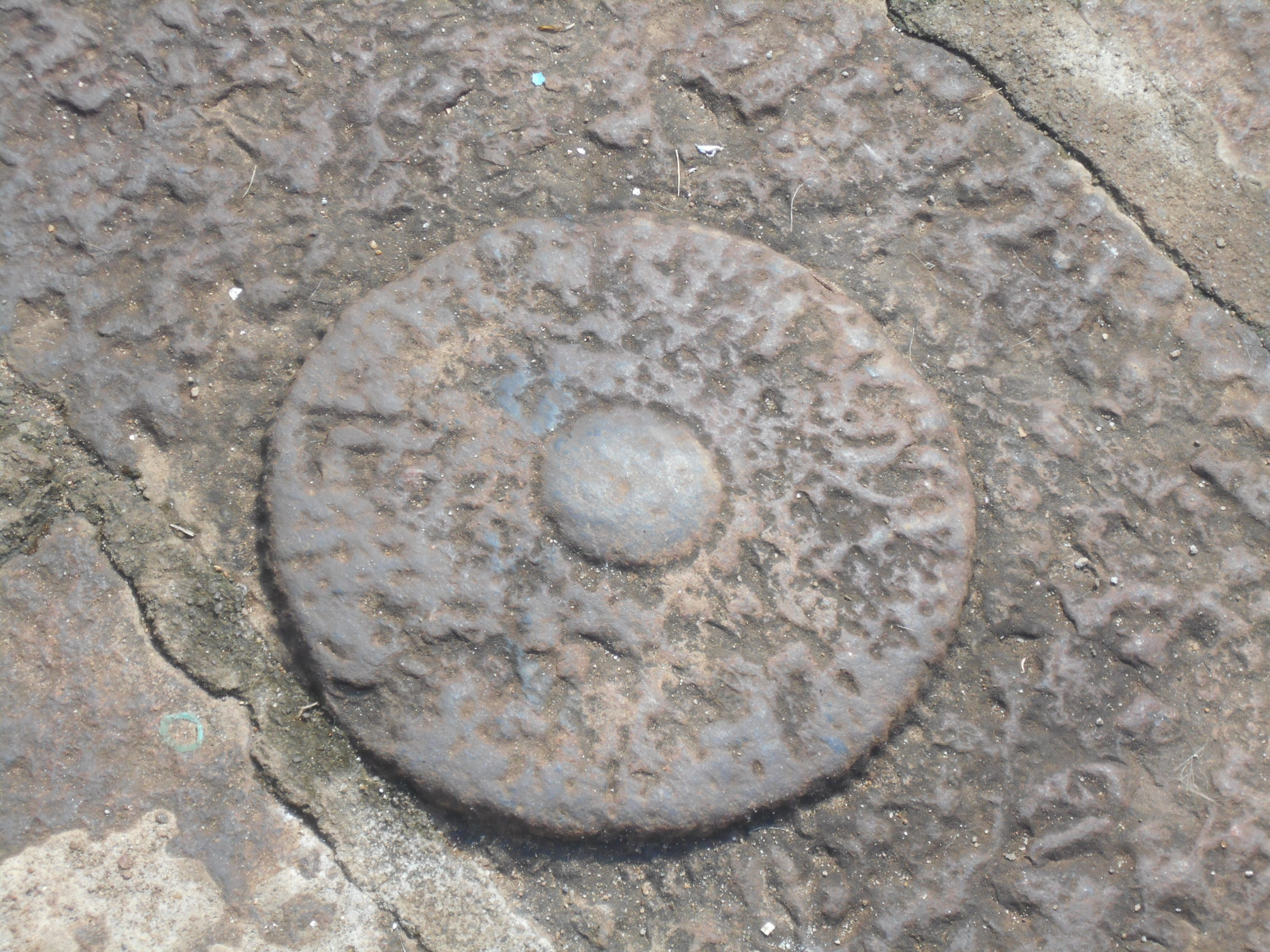
Another engraving on stone pavement pathway

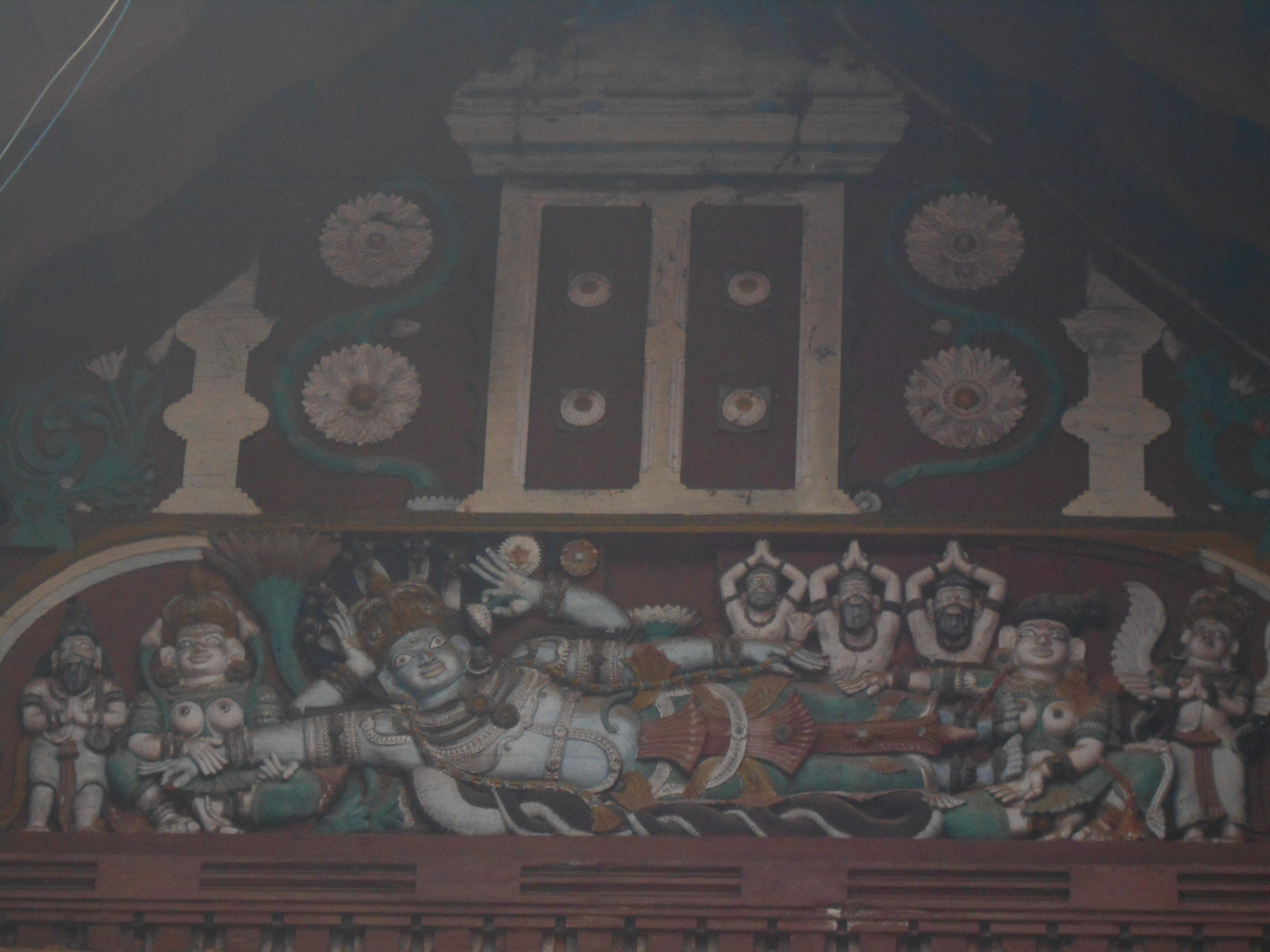
Engraving depicting 'Anandasayanam' on a single wood of Jackfruit tree

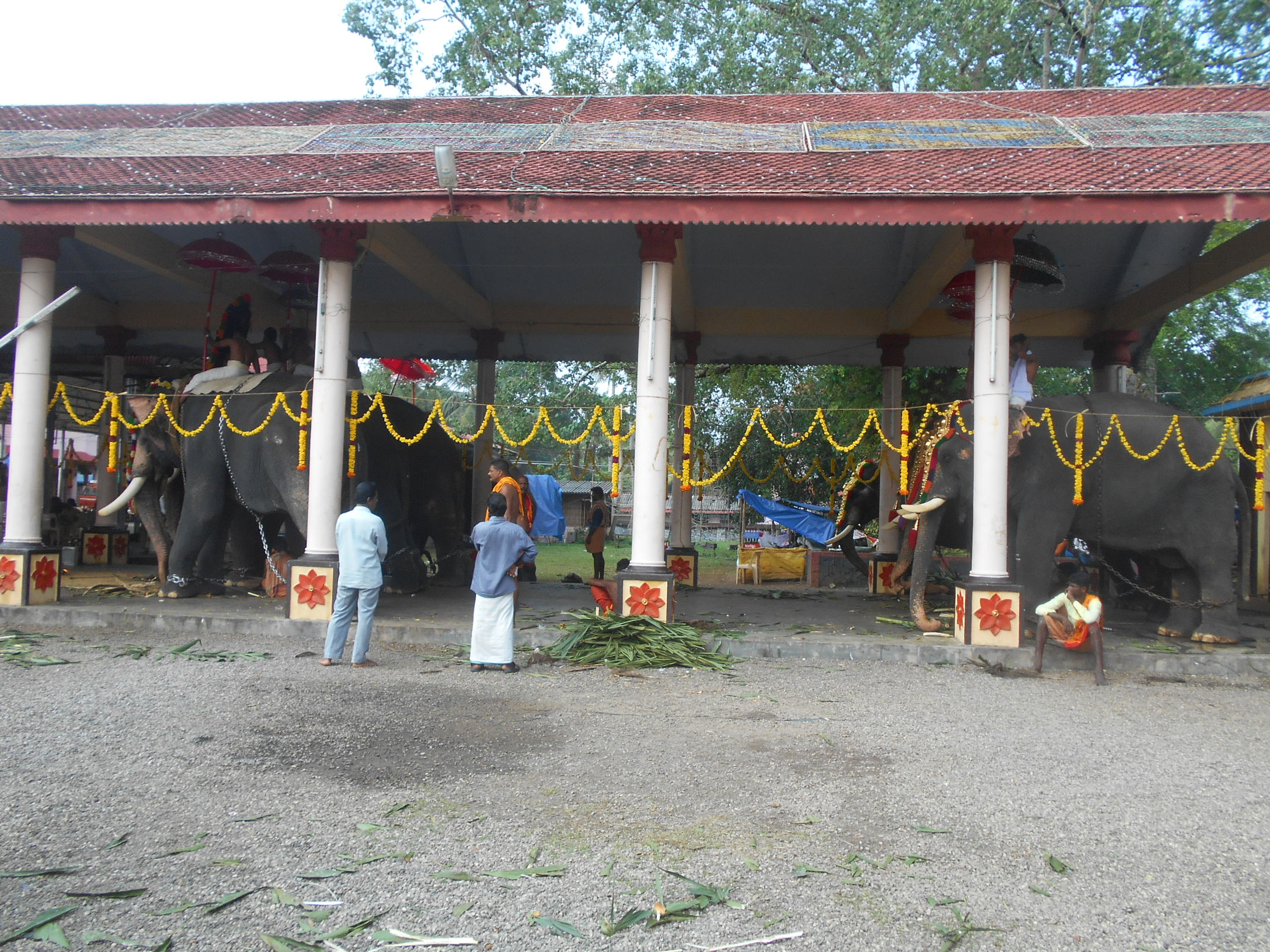
Elephant enclosure of temple. The old Elephant enclosure (ആനക്കൊട്ടില്‍-ānakkeāṭṭil) was built of stone.

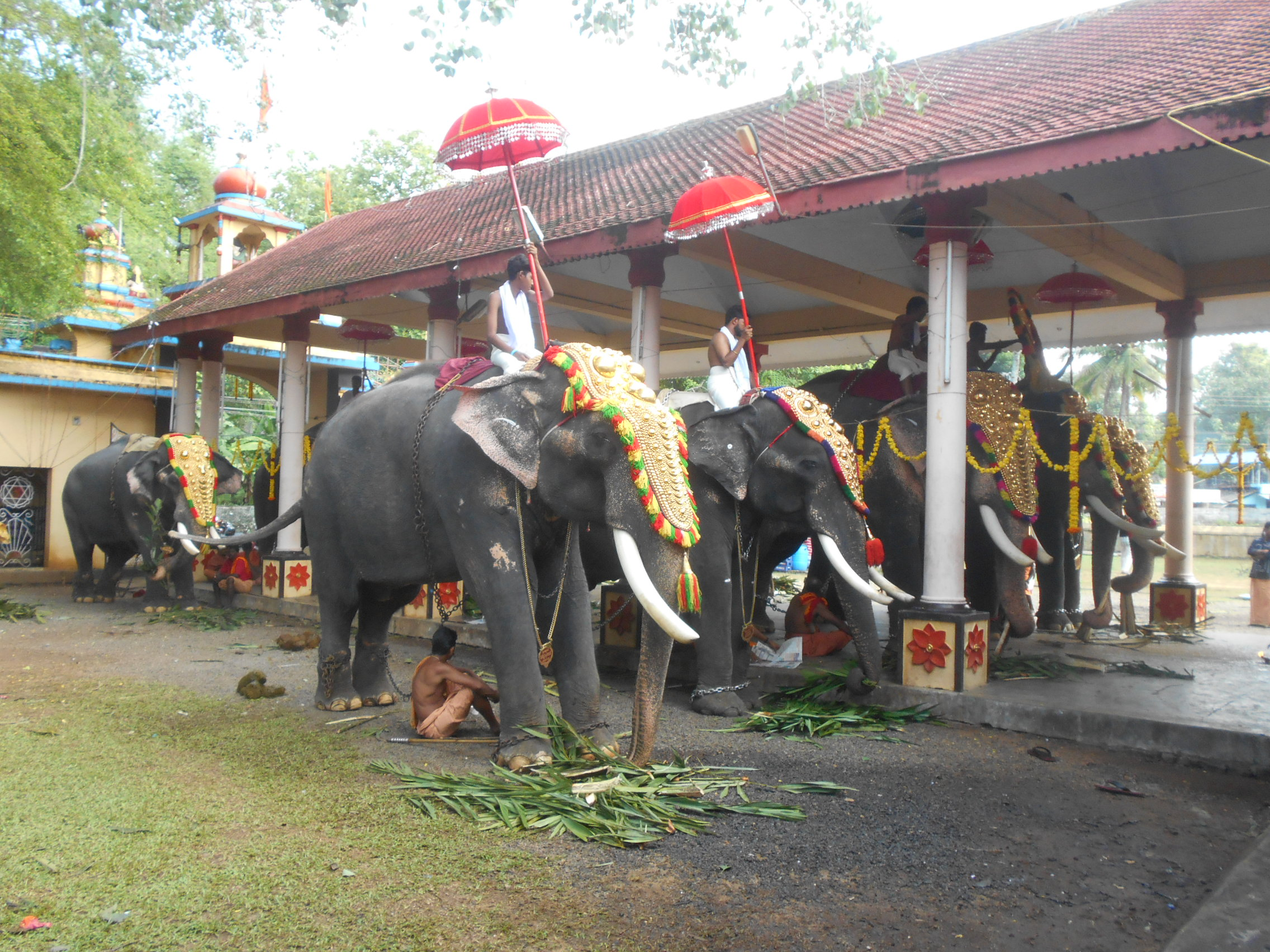
Elephants are standing in the Elephant enclosure during Pooram
