= Kadakkad Sree Bhadrakali Temple =

- കടയ്ക്കാട് ശ്രീ ഭദ്രകാളീക്ഷേത്രം
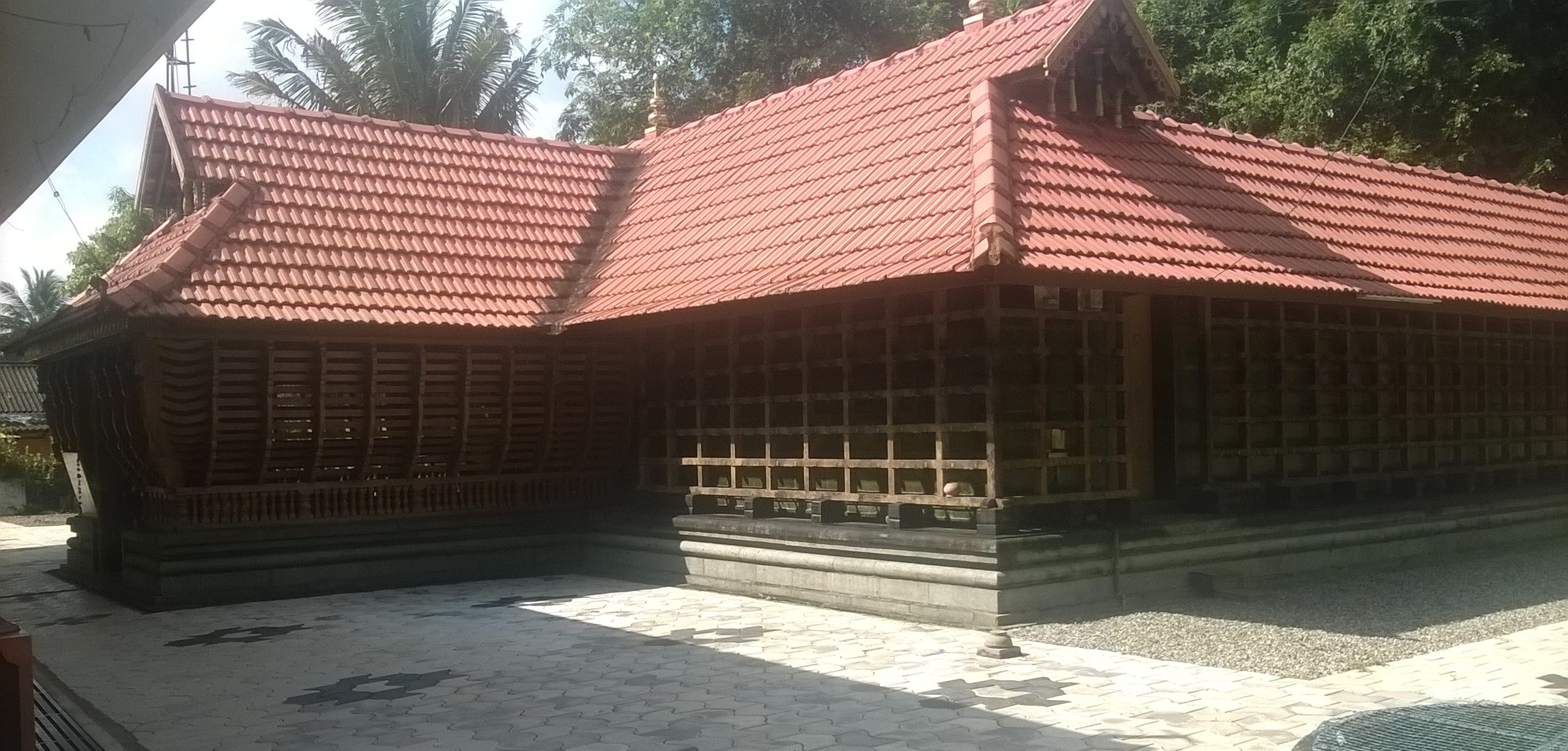
- Kadakkad Sree Bhadrakali Temple

- Kadakkad Sree Bhadrakali Temple (Kerala) Kadakkad Sree Bhadrakali Temple (India)

Religion
- Affiliation: Hinduism
- District: Pathanamthitta
- Deity: Bhadrakali
- Festival: Pongala

Location
- Location: Pandalam
- State: Kerala
- Interactive map of Kadakkad Sree Bhadrakali Temple
- Coordinates: 9°13′25.5″N 76°41′28.4″E

Architecture
- Type: Kerala architecture
- Elevation: 41.6 m (136 ft)

Website
- kadakkadtemple.com

Kadakkad Sree Bhadrakali Temple (Malayalam:കടയ്ക്കാട് ശ്രീ ഭദ്രകാളീക്ഷേത്രം) is a Hindu temple at Pandalam, India.It is located to the north of Kadakkad, by the Pathanamthitta MC Road. The temple complex also includes an anakkottil (platform for elephants during the rite Seva) and an office room. The temple has arrangements for Hindu wedding, including feast hall and change rooms. It also has a stage to conduct cultural events. The main deity of the temple is Bhadrakali. The temple also has shrines of other deities such as Brahmarakshas, Yakshi, Nāga.

== Festivals ==
=== Pongala ===
The annual Pongala festival attracts hundreds of women devotees to the shrine.

'Pongala' ritual comprises preparing ‘prasad’ for the deity outside the shrine. Women cook rice and jaggery in earthen pots and they offer it to the Goddess. They also cook different type of sweet dishes – called ‘mandaputtu,’ ‘appam,’ ‘therali’ – made out of rice powder and jaggery. Coconut tree fronds are used to cook the ‘prasad.’

The temple is decorated during the period with natural materials.

Holy fire from the temple is taken out to start the fire for cooking Pongala.

== See also ==
- Kadakkad
