= Thrikkovil Sree Padmanabha Swami Kshetram =

Hindu temple in Pathanamthitta district, Kerala

Thrikkovil Sree Padmanabha Swami Temple
- Thrikkovil Sree Padmanabha Swami Temple, Vallicode, Pathanamthitta, Kerala

Religion
- Affiliation: Hinduism
- District: Pathanamthitta
- Deity: Vishnu
- Festival: Dasavatara chaartu

Location
- Location: Vallicode
- State: Kerala
- Country: India
- Coordinates: 9°13′44.1″N 76°46′07.8″E

Architecture
- Type: Architecture of Kerala

Specifications
- Temple: One
- Elevation: 47.7 m (156 ft)

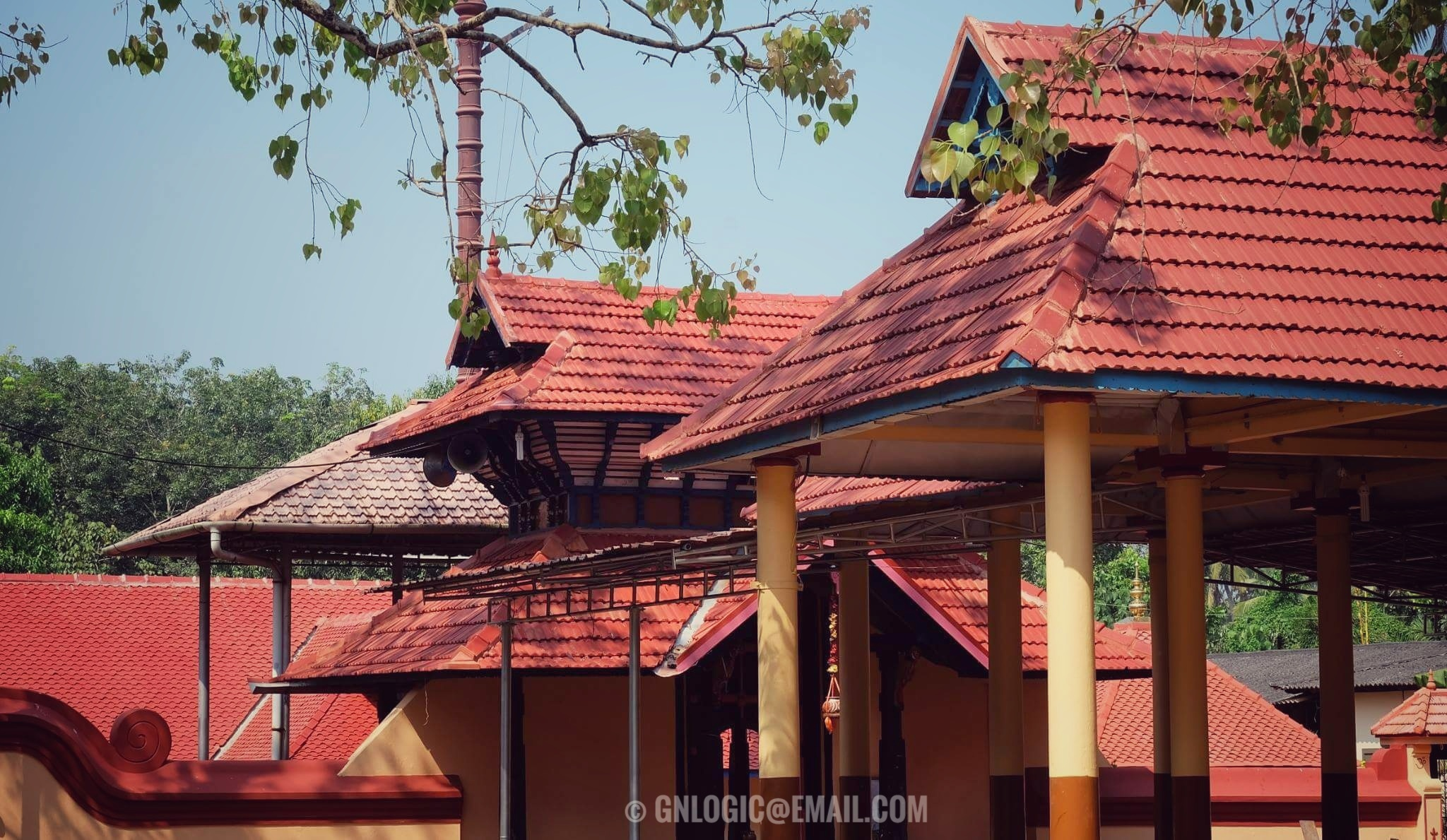
Thrikkovil temple entrance, Vallicode

Thrikkovil Sree Padmanabhaswamy temple (Malayalam: തൃക്കോവില് ശ്രീ പദ്മനാഭ സ്വാമി ക്ഷേത്രം) is a Hindu temple with Vishnu as the presiding deity, at Vallicode village in Pathanamthitta District in Kerala, India.

== See also ==
- Temples of Kerala
