= Thattayil =

Thattayil Pandalam Thekkekara
- village
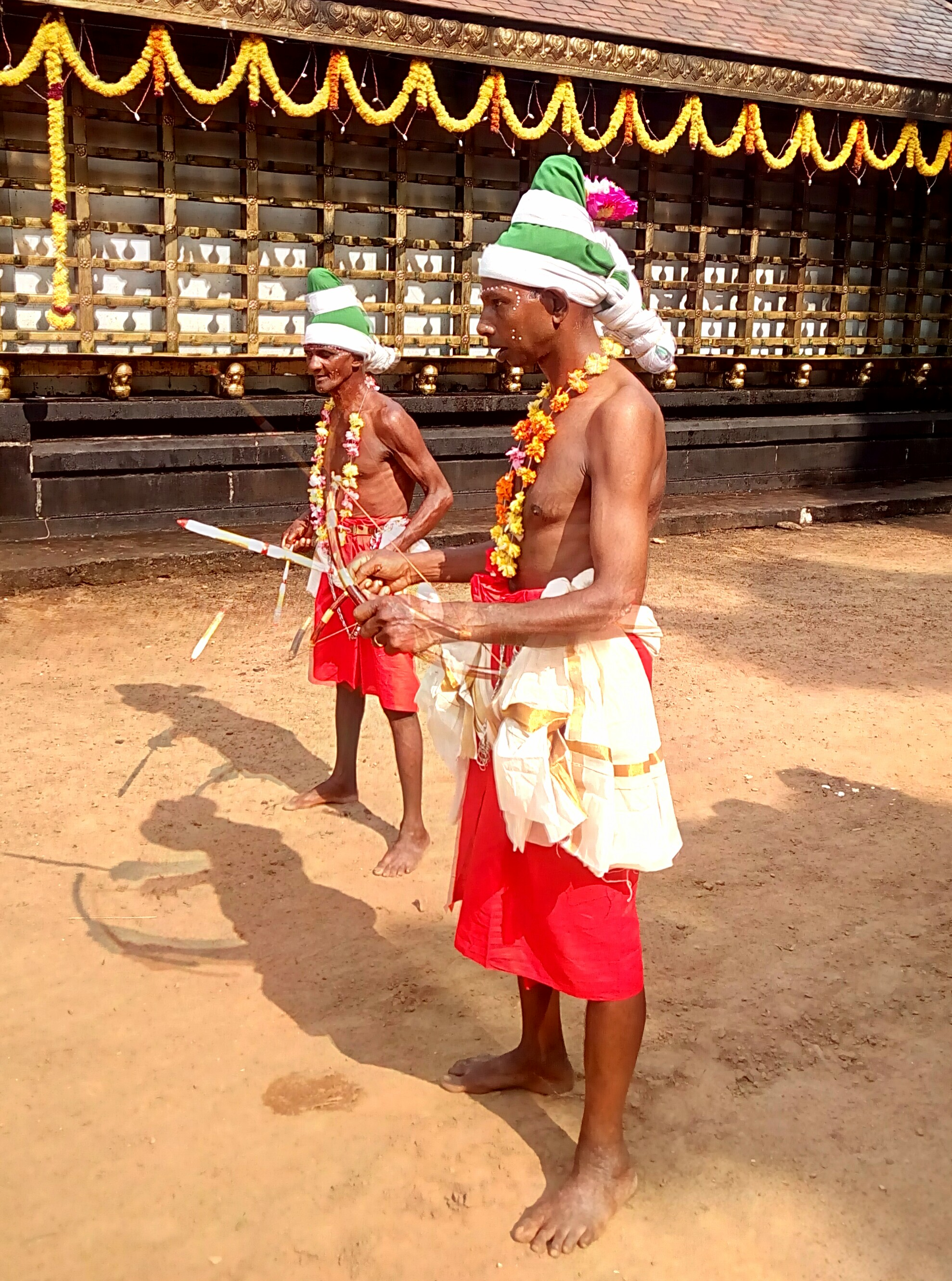
- Garudan Thookkam participants
- Interactive map of Thattayil
- Coordinates: 9°11′0″N 76°44′0″E
- Country: India
- State: Kerala
- District: Pathanamthitta

Languages
  - Official: Malayalam, English
- Time zone: UTC+5:30 (IST)
- Telephone code: 04734
- Vehicle registration: KL-26
- Coastline: 0 kilometres (0 mi)
- Nearest city: Adoor, Pandalam, Pathanamthitta
- Lok Sabha constituency: Pathanamthitta
- Climate: Tropical monsoon (Köppen)
- Avg. summer temperature: 35 °C (95 °F)
- Avg. winter temperature: 20 °C (68 °F)

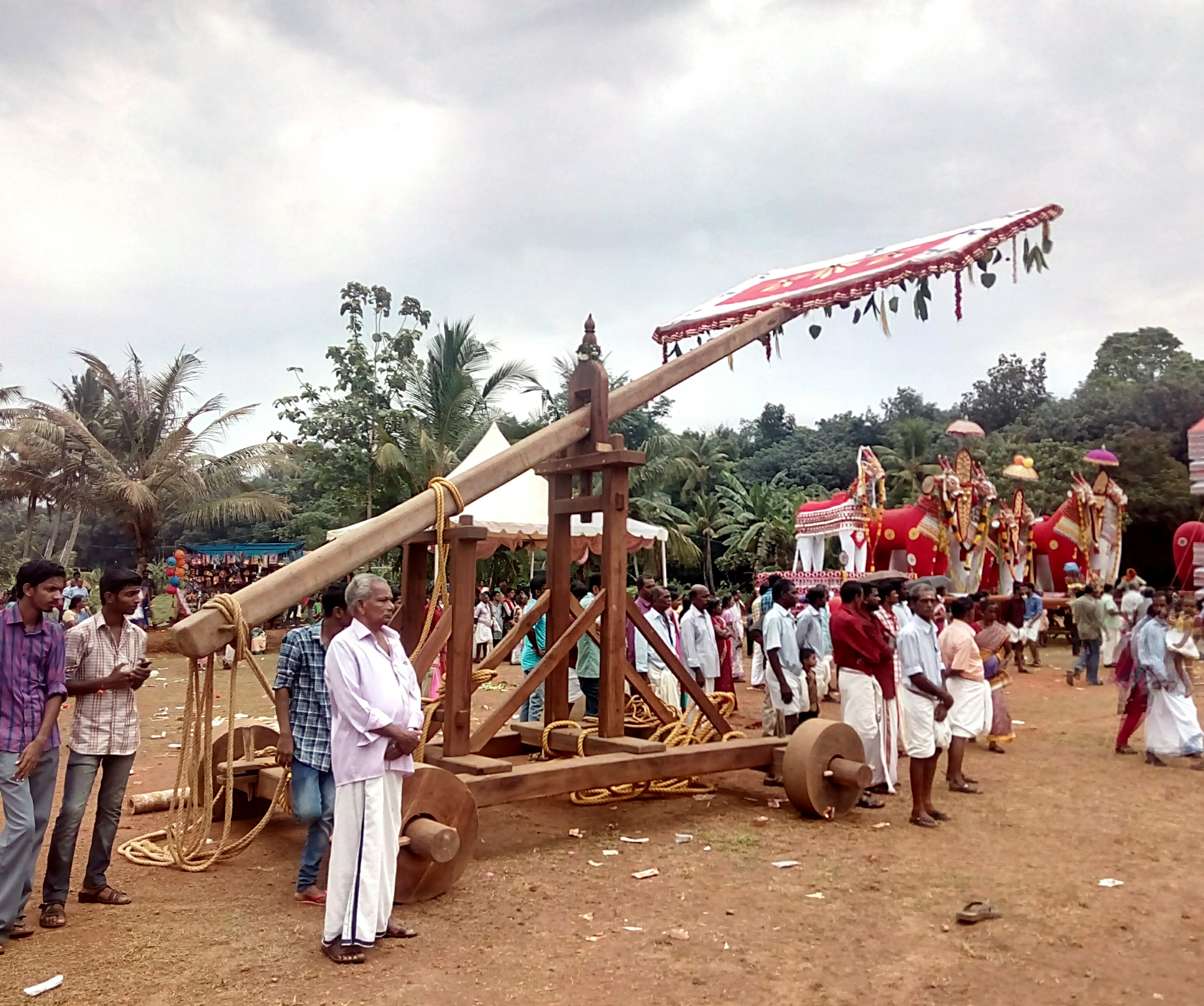
Pain Hanging Ritual

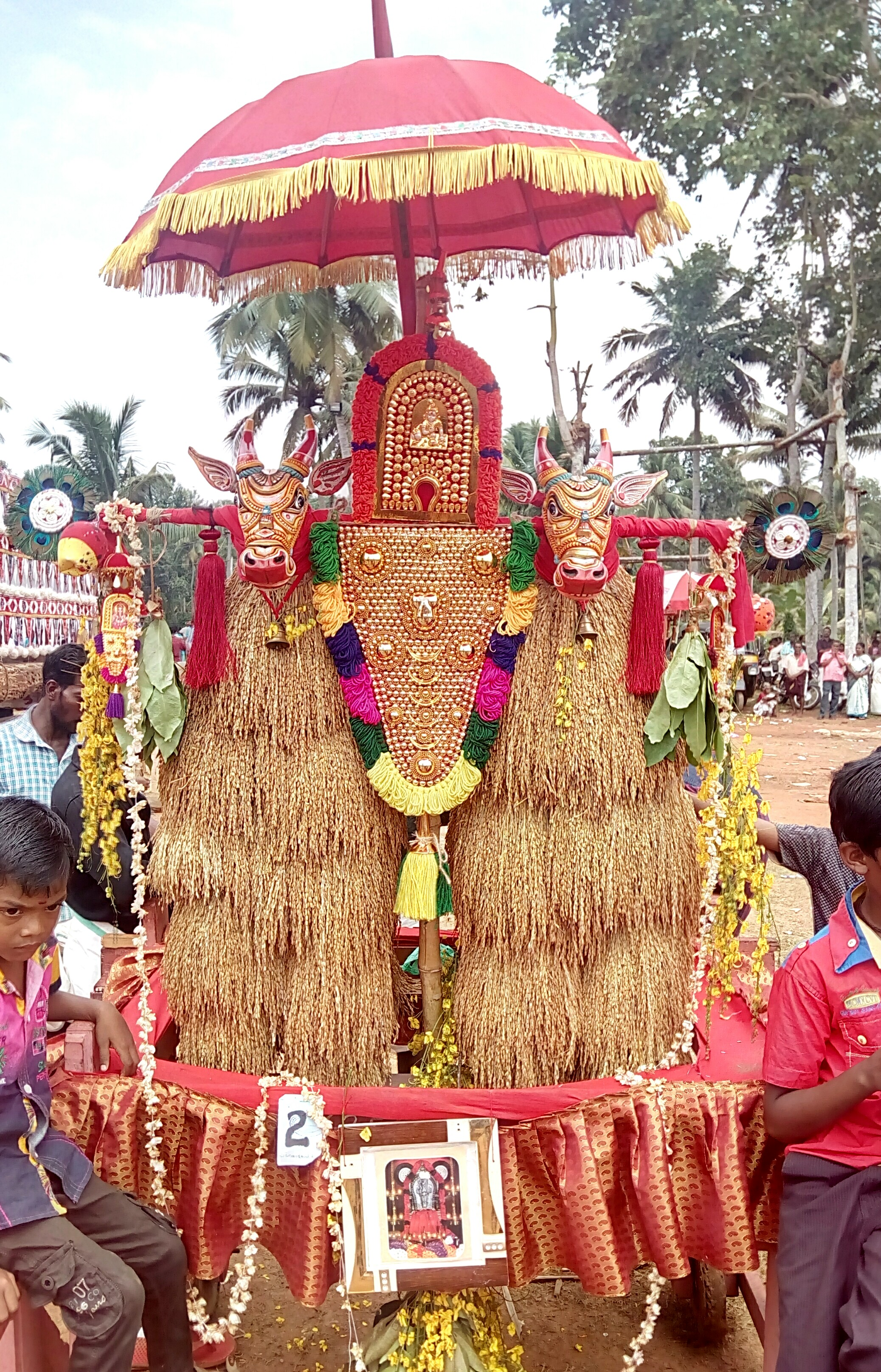
Kathirkala Orippuram Thatta

Thattayil is a village near Pandalam in the Pathanamthitta district, state of Kerala, India.

== Administration ==
This place comes under the Pandalam Thekkekara gram panchayat. Agriculture is an important means of the livelihood of the people at this place.

== Economy ==
The main agricultural products are: rubber, rice, plantain, coconut, cashew, black pepper, and ginger.

== Bhagavathy Temple ==
Thattayil is famous for the Orippurathu Bhagavathy temple. Mannathu Padmanabhan started the Nair Service Society Karayogam movements in this village. Thattayil has NSS Karayogam Numbers 1 (Edamaly/Mallika) and 2 (Bhagavathickum Padinjare).
