= Omallur =

Omalloor Omalloor
- Town
- The main Omallur mansion or tharavadu
- Interactive map of Omalloor
- Coordinates: 9°14′48.3″N 76°45′3.47″E
- Country: India
- State: Kerala
- District: Pathanamthitta

Area
  - Total: 14.54 km^{2} (5.61 sq mi)

Population (2011)
  - Total: 17,611
  - Density: 1,211/km^{2} (3,137/sq mi)

Languages
  - Official: Malayalam, English
- Time zone: UTC+5:30 (IST)
- PIN: 689647
- Telephone code: 0468
- Vehicle registration: KL-03

Omallur is a small town in Kerala, about 3.5 km south of Pathanamthitta District headquarters. Omallur is famous for Vayal Vanibham, which is an annual farming fair held in the month of Meenam (October). People from both within and outside the town participate in the fair.

== Festivals ==
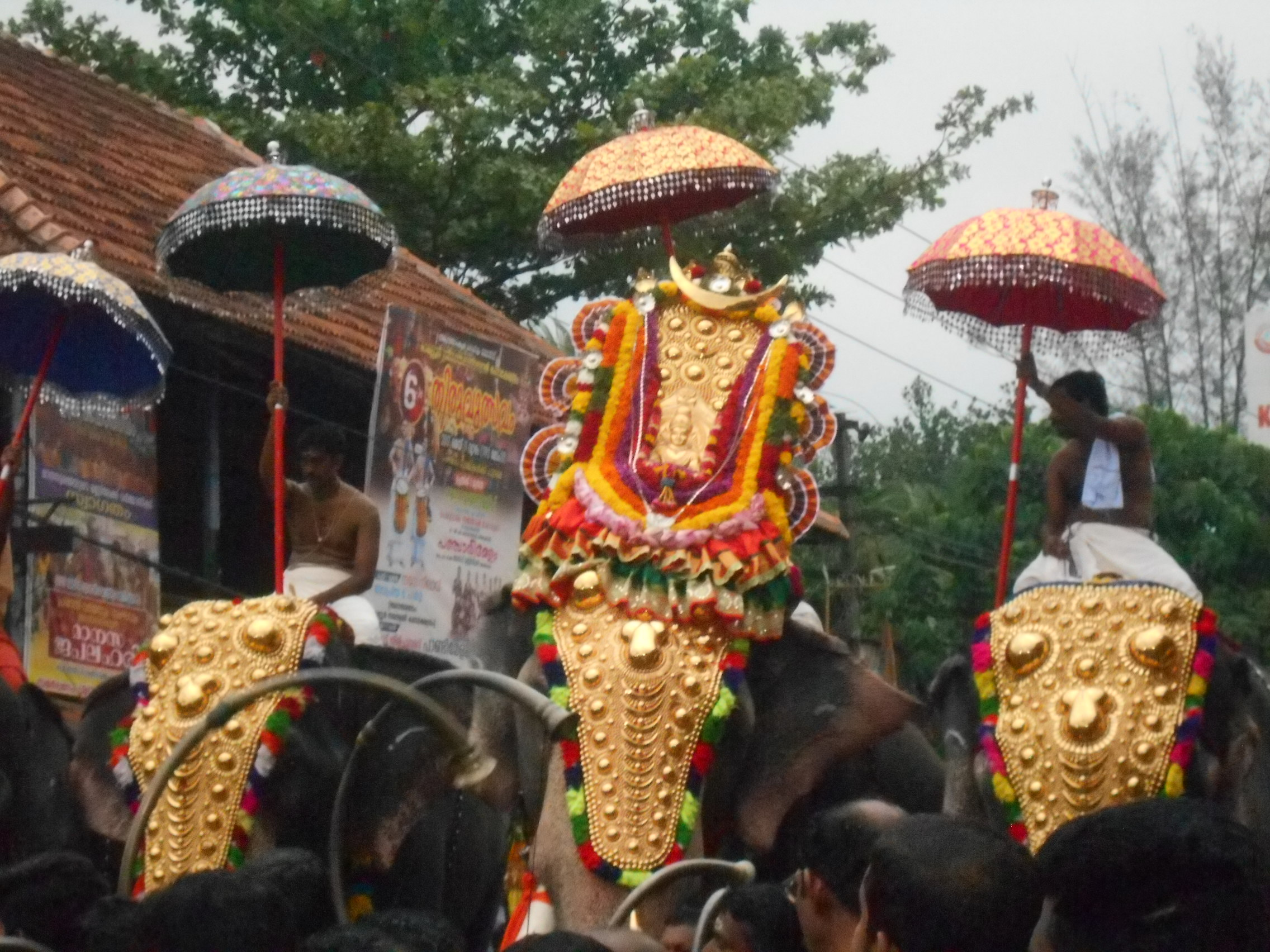
Omalloor Pooram

Temple festivals (Utsavam) and Church feasts (Palliperunal) are celebrated as village festivals. There are many historically important places of worship in Omalloor. The Rektha Kanda Swamy Temple is a grand temple situated in Omalloor, which dates back to the 8th century AD, is famous for its 10-day annual festival (utsavam). It is also a main pilgrim center for Sabarimala pilgrims. The St. Thomas Orthodox Valiya Palli (church) is another major place of worship for Christians. Manjanikkara Dayara is famous for its pilgrimage importance. Every year thousands of pilgrims come by foot to the tomb of Holy Patriarch Ignatius Elias III at Manjanikkara. St. Peter's Jacobite church, St. Stephen's Jacobite Church, St. Thomas Malankara Catholic Church, Puthenpeedika, St. Peter's Malankara Catholic Church, Cheekanal and St. Thomas Mar Thoma Church, Cheekanal are some other important places worship at Omalloor. Mathoor Kaavu Bhagavathi Temple, situated on the banks of Achenkovil river, is a famous Hindu temple. The River Achankovil marks the eastern border of the Omalloor Panchayat. The Thazhoor Bhagavati Temple, famous for the annual Padayani rituals during the Malayalam month of Kumbham is located on the banks of the River Achankovil.

== Schools ==
There are quite a few education institutions as Omallur is very close to Pathanamthitta town. These include Amrita Vidyalayam, Catholicate Higher Secondary School, Bhavan's Vidya Mandir and Arya Bharati High School. Aarsha Bharatha Vidyalaya is a prominent school in Omallur with classes from pre-KG to 7th grade. Government Higher Secondary School Omallur founded in 1805, offer education till grade 12.

== Demographics ==
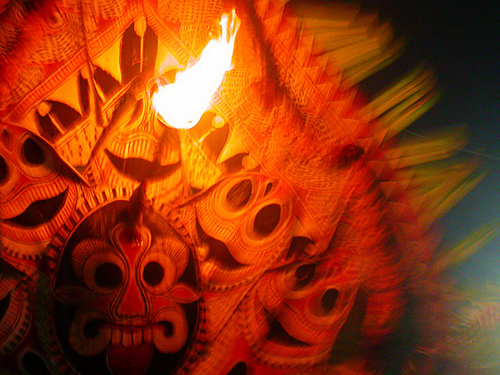
A Kolam Thullal in Omallur

Various sections of Christianity and Hinduism coexist; the Nairs, Ezhavas, Viswakarmas Veerashaivas and the Scheduled Class & Tribes constitute the major sections of the Hindu religion.

As per the 2011 Census of India, Omalloor had a population of 17611 with 8189 males and 9412 females.

Like many other communities in central Kerala, Omallur has a relatively high proportion of working age adults. Non-resident Indians (NRIs) amount to 35% of cash flow . There are a number of small family-owned retail shops, and rubber plantations etc.

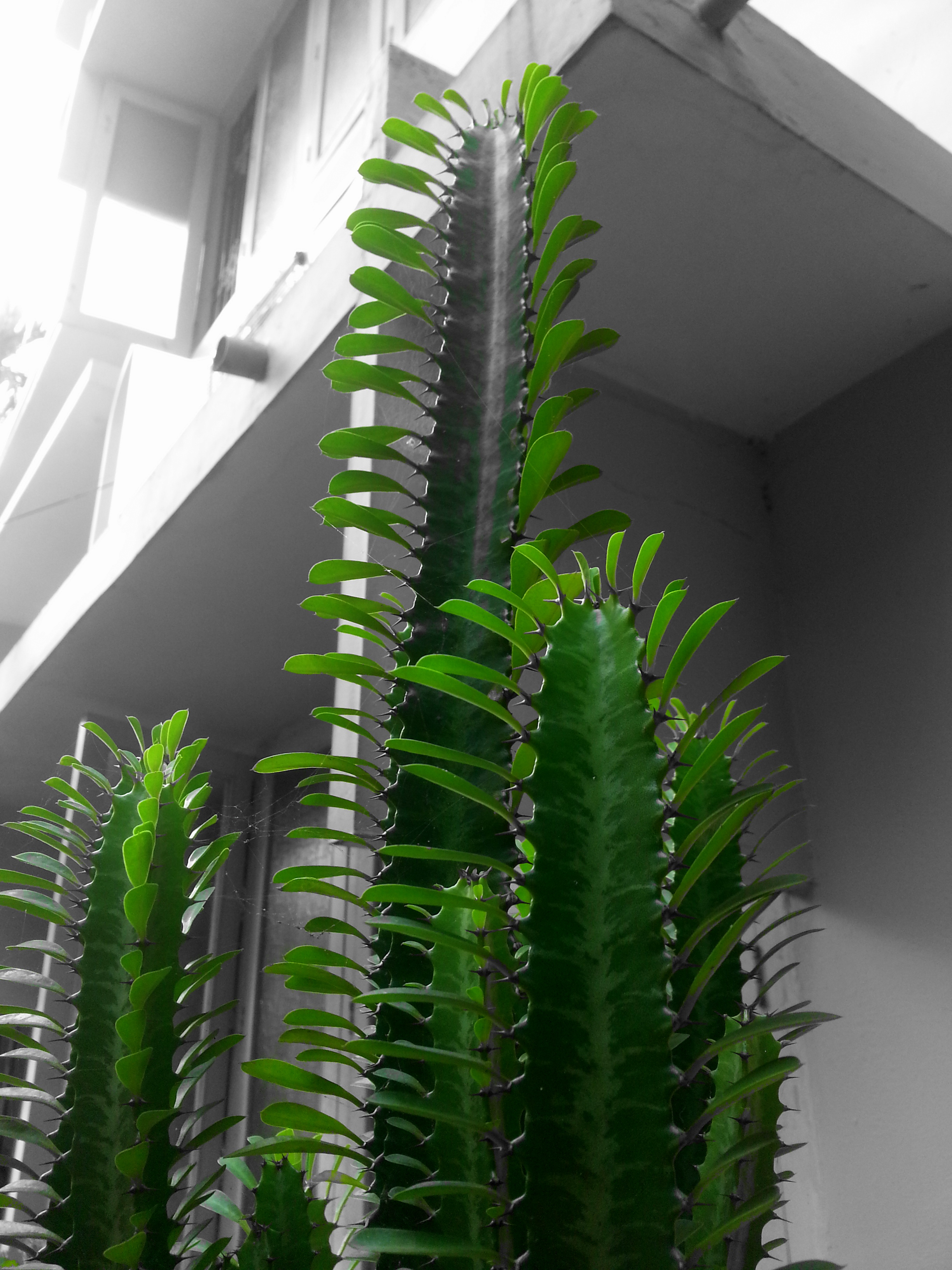
A rare variety of cactus exclusive to Omallur

== Noted Personalities ==
- Father V. C. Samuel - President World Council of Churches
- Omalloor Chellamma - Malayalam drama and cine actress of the 1950s. See Premalekha
- Omalloor Prathapachandran - Malayalam film actor
- Captain Raju - Malayalam film actor

== See also ==
- Pathanamthitta District
- Vazhamuttom
- Thazhoor Bhagavathy Kshetram
- Vallicode
- Thumpamon
