= Sugarcane Seed Farm =

Sugarcane farm in Kerala, India

Sugarcane Seed Farm is an India-based integrated farm and sugarcane producing institute under Department of Agriculture, Government of Kerala started in 1963. It is situated in Pandalam, Pathanamthitta, Kerala.
