= Vallicode =

- village
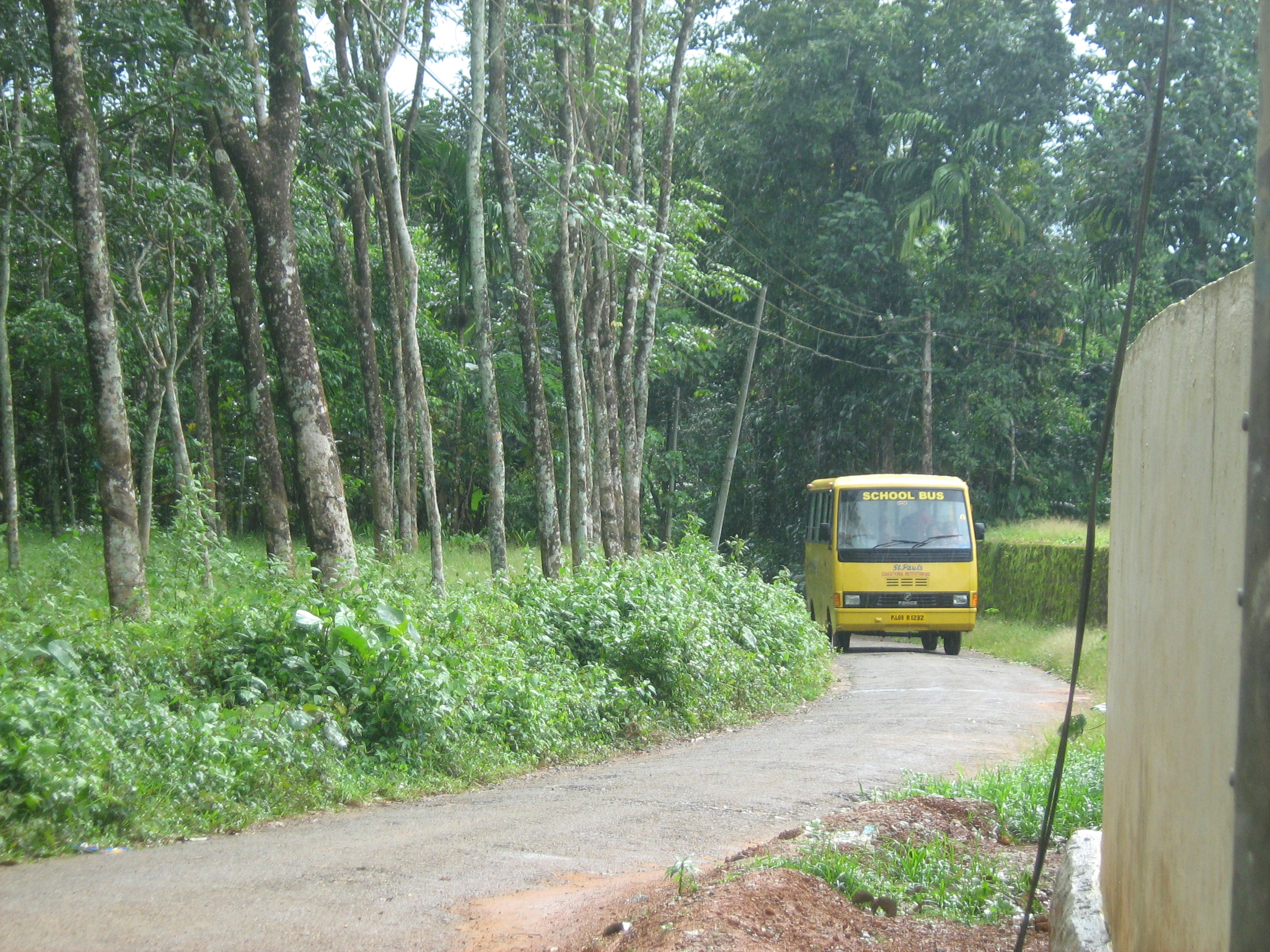
- Nariyapuram, Vallicode
- Interactive map of Vallicode
- Coordinates: 9°13′48″N 76°46′16″E
- Country: India
- State: Kerala
- District: Pathanamthitta
- Elevation: 19 m (62 ft)

Population (2003)
  - Total: 20,750

Languages
  - Official: Malayalam, English
- Time zone: UTC+5:30 (IST)
- PIN: 689648

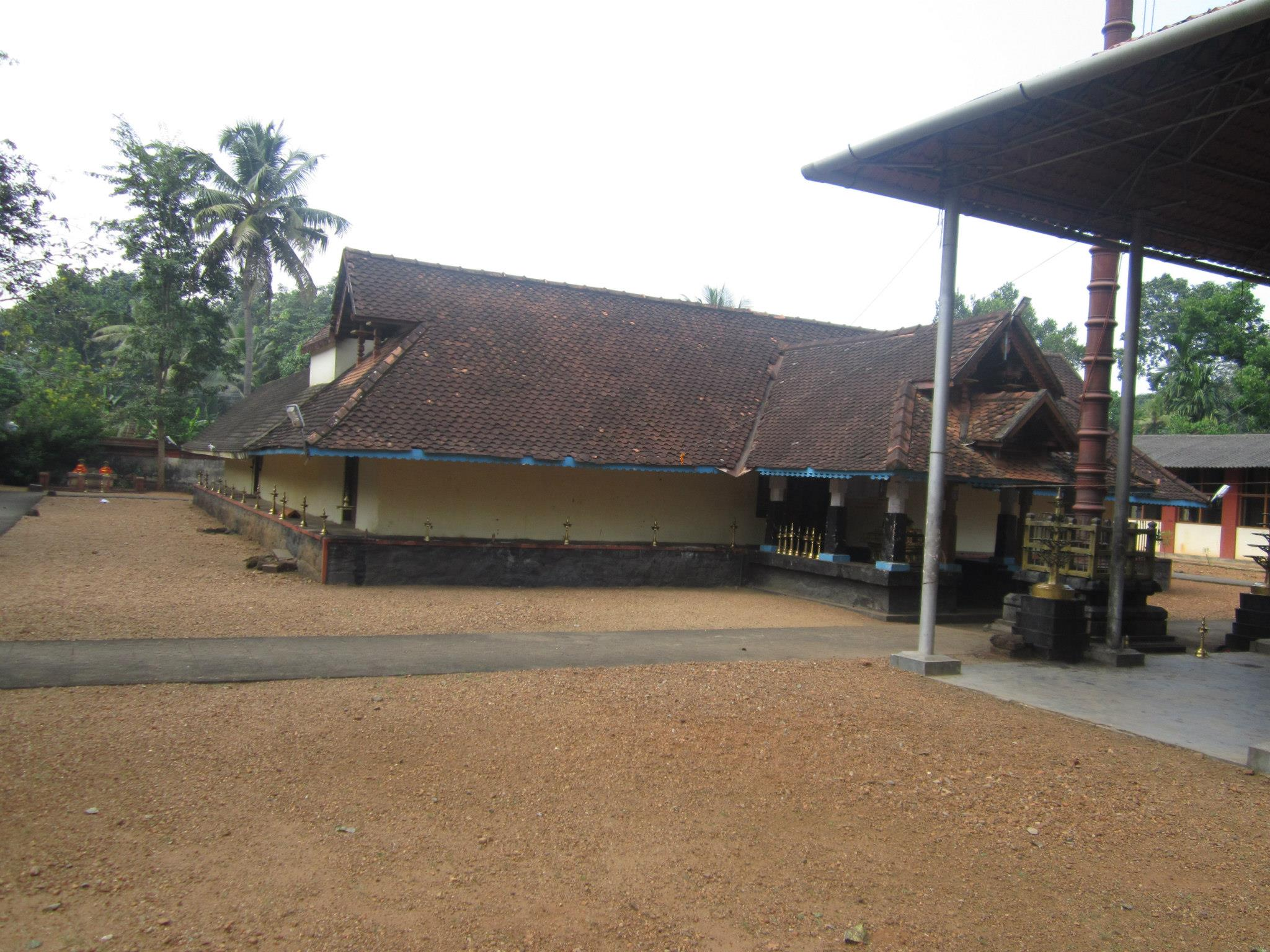
Vallicode Thrikovil temple

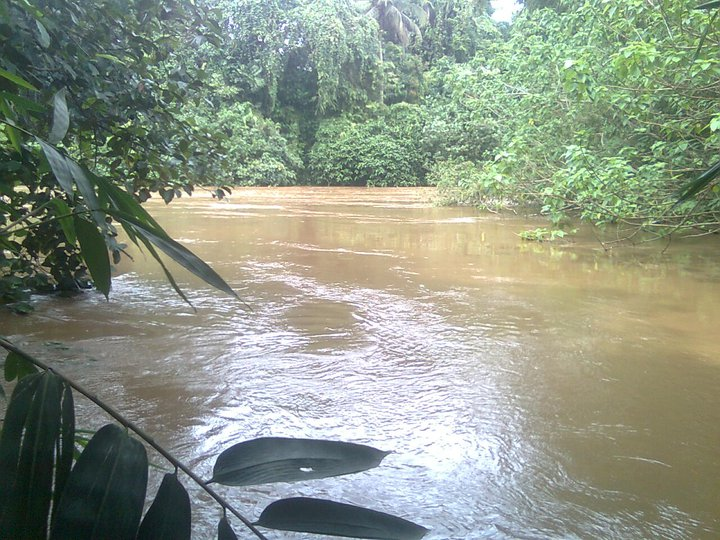
Achankovil River at Vallicode

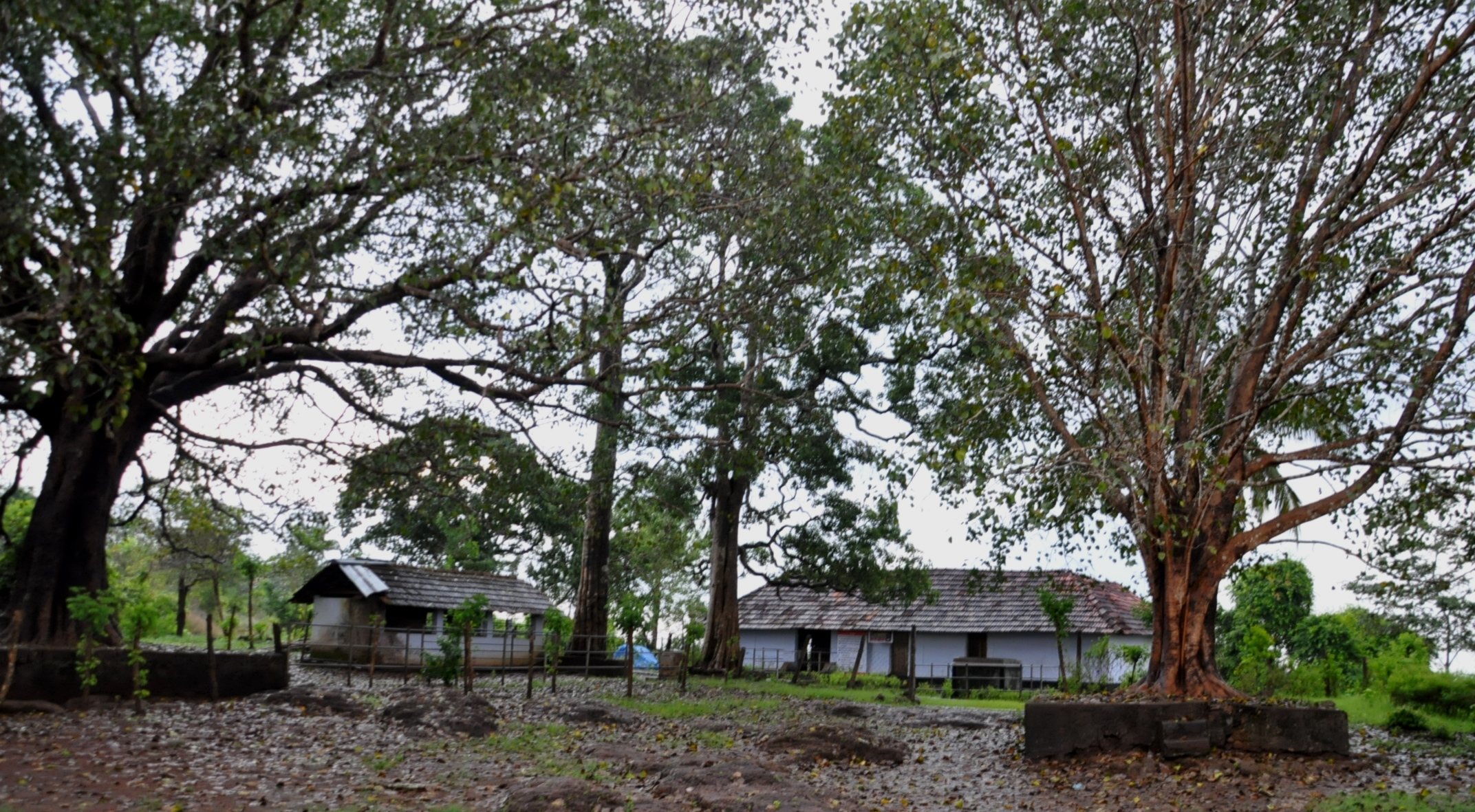
Naranath Bhranthan temple at Rayiram hills

Vallicode (pronounced valli-koad) is a village in konni taluks Pathanamthitta district in Kerala, India. It is situated at about 7 km from the district headquarters of Pathanamthitta at south-east direction.

== Geography ==
The northern and southern sides of the village are protected by tall hills and a valley emerges in between the hills. The valley, decorated by tall trees and green vegetation descends to the paddy fields at the centre, which is watered by the stream originating from the hills, flowing through the heart of the village, like a life-line and reaches the Achankovil River. Vallicode is a village with temples, valleys, and rivers. It is home to Thrikovil temple and home to many Malayali families.

== Post Office ==
The postal pincode for vallicode is 689648. Do note - Vallicode is not the same as Vallicode-Kottayam though both are pretty adjacent.

Naryiapuram PO. pin code 689513

== Access ==
One can reach Vallicode from Pathanamthitta via Kodumthara - Vazhamuttom - Thazhoorkkadavu Bridge. It is only 6 km from Pathanamthitta City.

Alternatively, one can also arrive via Kaipattoor Kadav Junction on the Adoor - Pathanamthitta route, Vallicode-Konni Town-10 km. Via vazhamuttom-mallasery-via konni

== Temples ==
Thrikkovil Sree Padmanabha Swami Kshetram
This temple is supposedly the second of its kind in Kerala, the first being the temple in Thiruvananthapuram.

Thrippara Shiva Kshetram
A temple situated near the river-bed with Lord Shiva as the presiding deity.

Thazhoor Bhagavathi Kshetram
Another Devi temple by the Achankovil River known for their annual Kumba Bharani festival and Kolam thullal dedicated to goddess Kali.

Mampilalil Ayyappa Kshetram
This is an Ayyappa Temple on the south side of the Valllicode.

Puthiyedathukavu Devi Kshetram
Another Devi (Kali) temple in Vallicode

Ammankovil Bhagavathy Temple
This Devi Temple situate the river-bed of Achankovil and near the Bridge of Kaipattoor.

sreekandapuram mahadevar temple
Another temple in Vallicode( lord shiva and parvathi devi's temple).

 Mahadeva Kshetram.
 Bhuvanaswaram. Nariyapuram PO

== See also ==
- Pathanamthitta
- Kaipattoor
- Pandalam
- Vazhamuttom
- Omallur
- Thazhoor Bhagavathy Kshetram(temple)
- Chandanapally
- Bhuvanaswaram, Nariyapuram PO
