= St. George Orthodox Church, Chandanapally =

Coordinates: 9°12′31″N 76°46′24″E

St. George Orthodox Valiyapalli, Chandanapally
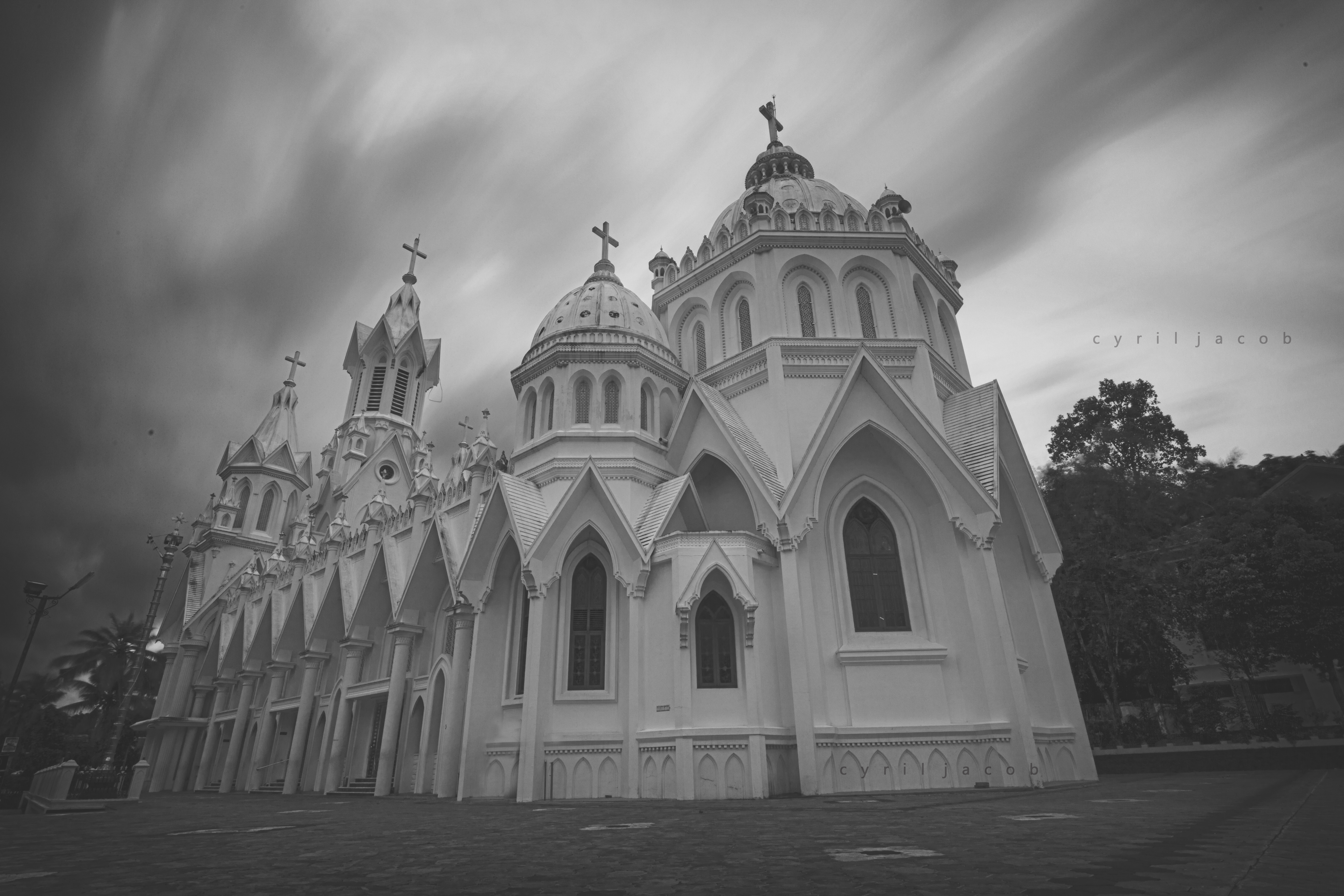
- outside view of the church
- St. George Orthodox Valiyapalli, Chandanapally
- Denomination: Malankara Orthodox Church; Parish
- Tradition: Malayalam
- Website: chandanappallyvaliapally.org

History
- Founded: 1810

St. George Orthodox Church, Chandanapally, also known as Chandanapally Valiyapally, is a prominent parish of the Malankara Orthodox Syrian Church, located in the village of Chandanapally in Pathanamthitta district, Kerala, India. Dedicated to St George, it is one of the largest churches in Kerala and is renowned for its Indo-Saracenic architectural style, making it both a spiritual and architectural landmark.

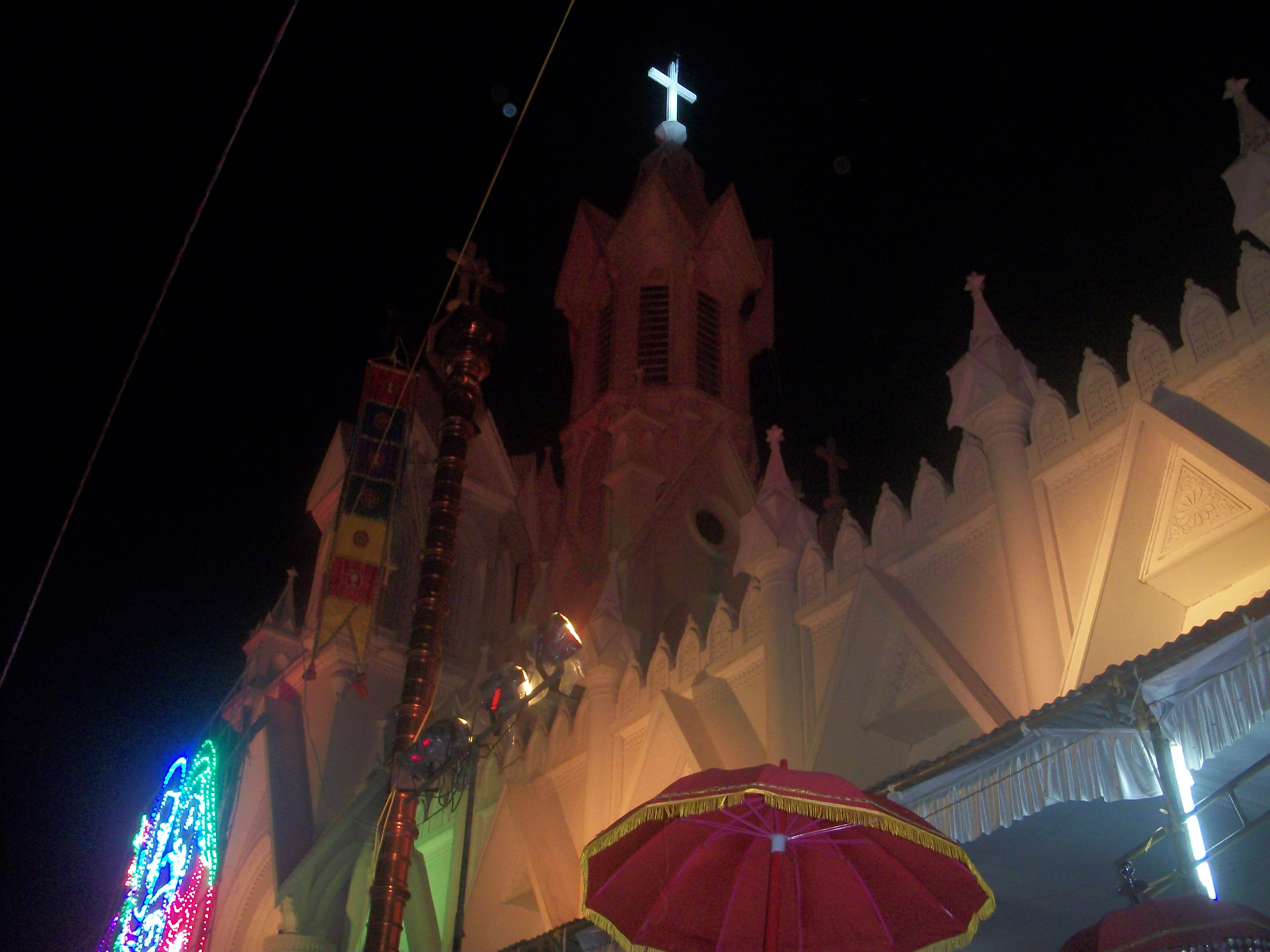
Church in 2015

== Chembuduppu ==
Chembaduppu Nercha

Chembuduppu (meaning picking of copper vessel) is a special ritual that has a place in Kerala’s cultural history. When the old church was built two centuries ago, local Hindus brought rice from different places to feed hundreds of voluntary labourers. They cooked this rice on the bank of the stream and ceremoniously served it to the volunteers. It is in memory of this event that the "Chempeduppu" is celebrated every year. The main offering is rice cooked in a copper pot, which is taken to Kuthirappura by all the pilgrims from different places and the different religions who had gathered there for the celebrations. Later this cooked rice will be taken to their homes by the pilgrims.

The Orthodox church held its festival on 7 and 8 May.

== The mortal remains of St. George (Geevarghese Sahada) ==
St. Geevarghese Sahda is the local name for St. George. The mortal remains of St. Geevarghese Sahda which were kept in Mardion were received by Vattasseril Geevarghese Mar Dionysious (Malankara Metropolitan) and Moran Mar Baselios Geevarghese II Bava from Patriarch of the Holy See of Antioch and brought to Malankara on 1916 and were kept in Kunadara seminary. Later on 6 May 2004 they were received from Moran Mar Baselios Marthoma Mathews II Catholica Bava and kept in Chandanapally. The consecration of St Sahada's mortal remains in Chandanapally where the spiritual presence of St Geevarghese is present was done by Moran Mar Baselios Marthoma Mathews II Catholica Bava on 8 May 2004.

== Stone Cross (Kalkurish) ==
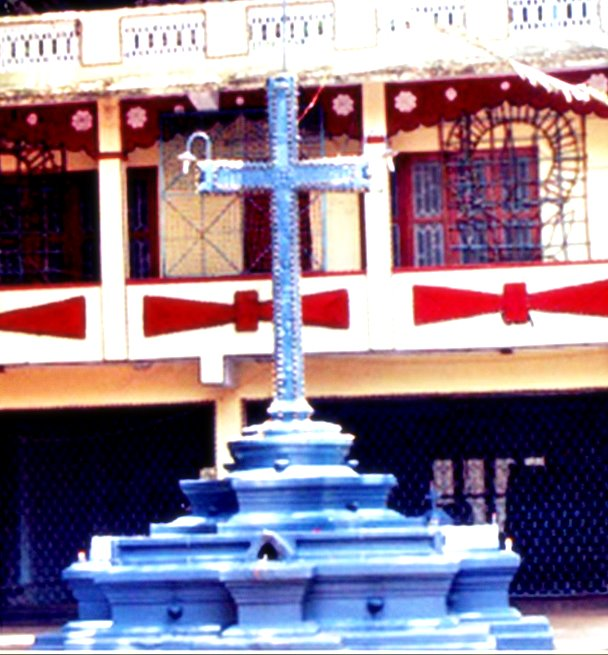
Stone Cross (Kalkurish)

This cross cut from stone, which has carvings of saints and angels, is a main attraction and shelter for the pilgrims visiting the church. It is said that whoever prays here, is immediately rewarded. Heartfelt prayers of the pilgrims are heard and showered with blessings. Some even have a vision of Sahada. Those who prayed by lighting candles on certain Fridays near the Kalkurishu were granted their petitions, without delay. The cross was constructed on the same day in which the Lord's cross was found (14 September). Every year the feast is celebrated on this day. ’Vellappachoru’, which is cooked with rice and coconut, is given as the offering. The pilgrims going to Sabarimala Aiyyappa Temple visiting here is a sight and model for secularism and religious harmony. Many pilgrims shelter here. This cross was carved out from a single stone, hence only it was known as kalkurish (stone cross). This church is also known as chandanapally valiyapally which is world-famous. Whoever shelters under st.george will be rewarded.
