= Naranganam =

- Village
- Location in Kerala, India Naranganam (India)
- Coordinates: 9°19′50″N 76°44′5″E
- Country: India
- State: Kerala
- District: Pathanamthitta

Government
  - Body: Panchayath

Population (2011)
  - Total: 16,452

Languages
  - Official: Malayalam, English
- Time zone: UTC+5:30 (IST)
- PIN: 689642
- Vehicle registration: KL-03

Naranganam is a village in Pathanamthitta district in the state of Kerala, India. It is home to Madathumpadi Devi Temple. Nearby places include Kozhencherry, Mylapra, Kadamananitta and Vazhakunnam.

== Demographics ==
As of 2011 India census, Naranganam had a population of 16452 with 7746 males and 8706 females.
