= Thazhoor Bhagavathy Kshetram =

Hindu temple in India

Thazhoor Bhagavathy Temple
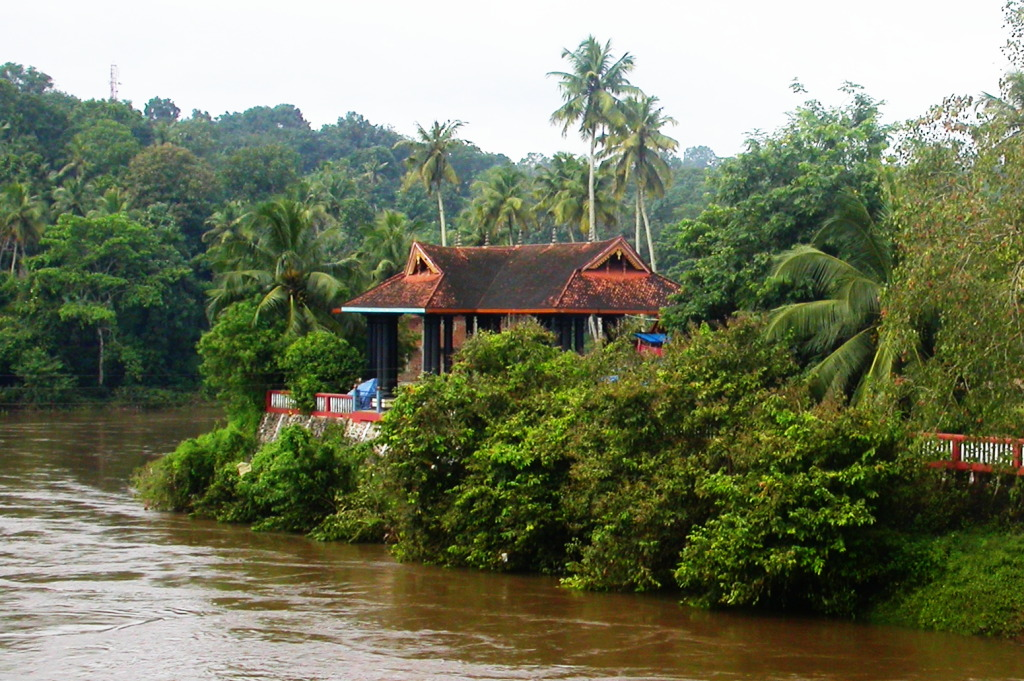
- Thazhoor Bhagavathy Temple, view from Thazhoor bridge

- Thazhoor Bhagavathy Temple, Vazhamuttom, Pathanamthitta, Kerala

Religion
- Affiliation: Hinduism
- District: Pathanamthitta
- Deity: Bhagavathy
- Festival: Kumbha Pongala

Location
- Location: Vazhamuttom
- State: Kerala
- Country: India
- Interactive map of Thazhoor Bhagavathy Temple
- Coordinates: 9°13′43″N 76°46′46″E

Architecture
- Type: Architecture of Kerala

Specifications
- Temple: One
- Elevation: 40.98 m (134 ft)

Thazhoor Bhagavathy Kshetram (Malayalam: താഴൂര് ഭഗവതി ക്ഷേത്രം) is a 300-year-old Hindu temple on the banks of the Achankovil river in Vazhamuttom, Pathanamthitta District in Kerala. The Devi (goddess) is the main deity here. The centuries-old temple was fully reconstructed in 2020.

== Folk arts ==
The Padayani, held in Kumbham, is very famous among the natives of Vallicode, Vazhamuttom, V Kottayam, Pramadom and the nearby areas. Devotees from other towns come to take part in this auspicious celebration of Devi Thazhooramma. Padayani performances are held at the temple annually. Padayani songs are very ancient folklore of Kerala. These folk-dances are traditionally preserved in this part of Kerala.

A Paraezhunnellippu is held in Kumbham that ends on the Vishu day in Medam. The Paraezhunnellippu is spread all over Vazhamuttom east, Vazhamuttom, Pramadam, Mullanikadu and Vallicode. The Parazhumallippu will cover every Hindu family in those localities. The devotees have this occasion to present as offerings, tender coconuts and seeds.

The temple is also famous for the folk arts and the "Kettukaazhcha" procession with Kaala (bull motif) and Kuthira vela (horse motif).

Folklore is that Thazhoor Bhagavathy is the sister of Valamchuzhy Devi. The temple is also a popular location for many wedding ceremonies with people coming in to conduct marriage rituals.

== Kumbha Pongala ==
The Pongala celebration commences on the morning of Kumbham 1. The women, dressed in traditional clean costumes for the occasion, offer Naivedyam to the goddess with their bare hands. The Goddess (Amma) accepts the offerings from thousands of devotees. It is believed that viewing Amma in all her glory at this time will free one from all sins and evils.

== Gallery ==
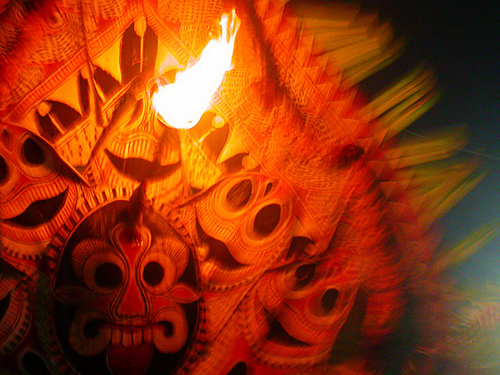
Padyani at Thazhoor Bhagavathy Temple at Vazhamuttom near Pathanamthitta

Padayani at Thazhoor Bhagavathy Temple

Thazhoor Padayani

== See also ==
- Omallur
- Kadammanitta
- Thattayil Orippurathu Bhagavathy Kshetram
- Temples of Kerala
