= Chandanapally, Kerala =

Chandanapally
- Village
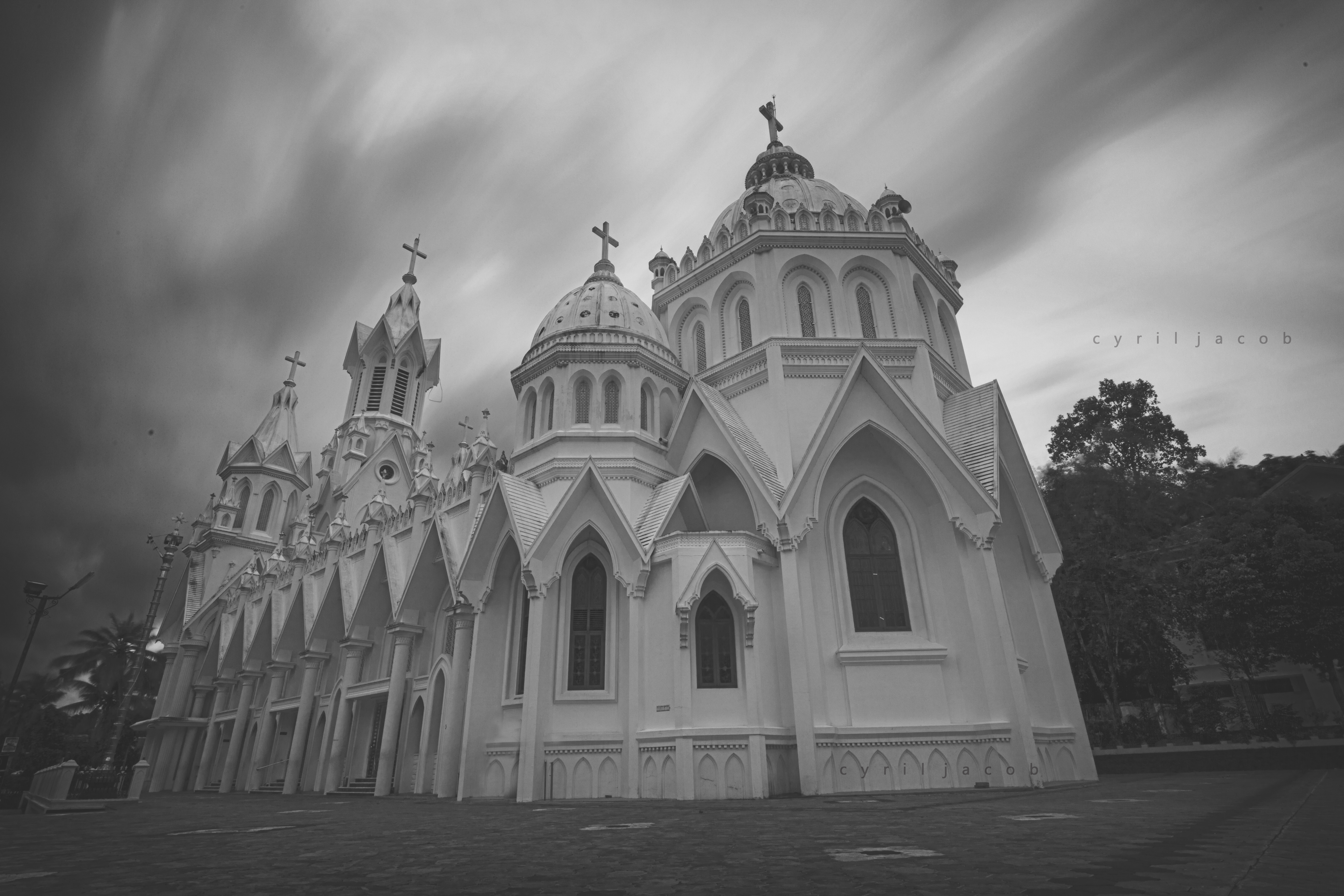
- Chandanappally Church

- Location in Kerala, India Chandanapally (India)
- Coordinates: 9°10′0″N 76°49′0″E
- Country: India
- State: Kerala
- District: Pathanamthitta

Languages
  - Official: Malayalam
- Time zone: UTC+5:30 (IST)
- PIN: 689648
- Vehicle registration: KL-26

Chandanapally is a village in the Kodumon subdivision in Pathanamthitta district of Kerala, India. The town is home to the annual Chandanappally Valiyapally Festival, which culminates in a Chembeduppu ceremony. The ceremony attracts a lot of pilgrims.

== Health centre ==
The hospital is Primary Health Center Chandanapally. There are three doctors available and 24 beds.

== See also ==
- St. George Orthodox Church, Chandanappally
- Pathanamthitta
