= Kaipattoor =

- village
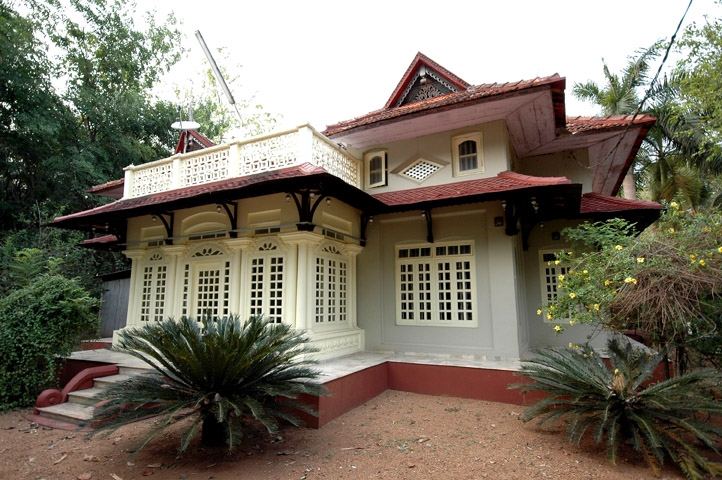
- Old style house in Kaippattoor
- Interactive map of Kaipattoor
- Coordinates: 9°13′0″N 76°45′0″E
- Country: India
- State: Kerala
- District: Pathanamthitta

Government
  - Body: Vallicode Panchayat

Languages
  - Official: Malayalam, English
- Time zone: UTC+5:30 (IST)
- PIN: 689648
- Vehicle registration: KL-03
- Coastline: 0 kilometres (0 mi)
- Nearest city: Pathanamthitta
- Lok Sabha constituency: Pathanamthitta
- Civic agency: Vallicode Panchayat
- Climate: Tropical monsoon (Köppen)
- Avg. summer temperature: 35 °C (95 °F)
- Avg. winter temperature: 20 °C (68 °F)

Kaipattoor is a small town in Vallicode panchayat of Pathanamthitta district in Kerala, India. Kaipattoor (also spelled Kaippattoor, Kaippattor and Kaippattur) is located in the western part of Pathanamthitta district. It is 6 kilometers from the district headquarters Pathanamthitta at south east direction. It is watered by the Achenkovil river. The village is under Vallicode Panchayat.

== Location ==
Kaipattoor is 102 km north of the state capital Thiruvananthapuram. The nearest towns are Pathanamthitta (6 km) in the north-east, Adoor (10 km) in the south, Pandalam (9 km) on the west, and Konni (15 km) on the east.

Kaippattoor is 6 km from Pathanamthitta, 9 km from Pandalam and 10 km from Adoor. The nearest railway stations are at Chengannur (25 km).

== Politics ==
Kaippattoor is part of Konni Assembly constituency and Pathanamthitta Lok Sabha constituency.

== Schools and Colleges ==
- Govt. LP School Kaipattoor (Kochupallikoodam)
- Kaipattoor Vocational Higher Secondary School
- St Gregorios Senior Secondary School - Affiliated to CBSE
- St George's Mount High School
- Indra Gandhi Open University
