= Kallisseri Azhakiyakavu Devi Temple, Chengannur =

Hindu temple in Alappuzha district, Kerala

- Azhakiyakavu Devi Temple, Kallissery, Alappuzha, Kerala

Religion
- Affiliation: Hinduism
- District: Alappuzha
- Deity: Bhadrakali
- Festivals: Padayani, Meena Bharani, Kumbha Bharani, Karthika Deepam, Maha Shivaratri, Navratri

Location
- Location: Kallissery, Chengannur
- State: Kerala
- Country: India
- Interactive map of Kallisseri Azhakiyakavu Devi Temple, Chengannur
- Coordinates: 9°20′11.7″N 76°36′33.8″E

Architecture
- Type: Architecture of Kerala

Specifications
- Temple: One
- Elevation: 43.82 m (144 ft)

Azhakiyakavu Devi Temple is situated at Kallisseri in Chengannur taluk of Alappuzha district, Kerala, India. It is a Hindu temple dedicated to the goddess Bhadrakali and is one of the 30 temples in Central Travancore area where the ancient Dravidian ritualistic art form of Padayani is performed annually. The temple is 4 kilometres (2.5 mi) from Chengannur Railway Station and Bus Stand respectively.

== Administration ==
Azhakiyakavu Devi Temple is located in Kallisserry, Chengannur taluk, on the banks of the holy river Pamba. The temple is managed by an elected committee from four kara (sub-provinces surrounding the temple), namely Umayattu Kara, Mepram, Mazhukkeer, and Thaimaravum Kara. These small provinces each have their own snake-boats which participate in the Aranmula and other local snake-boat races during Onam.

== Deities ==
The presiding deity of the temple is Bhadrakali. The idol of bhagavathy is daru with four hands, sitting on vethalam. Sub-deities include Karimkali, Yakshiamma, Rakshassu and Naga Devatas.

== Offerings ==
Chanthattam, Archana, Pushpanjali, Ganapathy Homam, Sahasra Namarchana, Muzhukappu, Payasam etc. Kolam Thullal is also an offering during annual festival.

== Festivals ==
Padayani festival is celebrated in this temple annually for eight days commencing from the Uthradam Star day to Aswathy Star day in the Malayalam month of Kumbham (February–March). Ancient folklore dramas such as Kakkasassi Natakam Padayani Mela and Pooppada Thullal are part of Padayani, but the most important part is Kolam Thullal. Bhairavi Kolam, Kalan Kolam (Kalari), Sundara Yakshi, Ambara Yakshi etc. are all depicted here. Kolam are made on areca palm sheaths by painting with natural dyes. Trained dancers wear them as masks along with breast plates of the same material and perform to the tune of songs meant for them with accompaniment from the thappu percussion instrument.

Kumbha Bharani, Meena Bharani, Shivaratri, Navaratri, Thirukkarthika etc. are all celebrated.

== See also ==
- Anandavalleeswaram Temple, Kollam
- Othera Puthukulangara Bhagawathi Temple
