= Pandalapaka =

Pandalapaka may refer to:

- Pandalapaka, East Godavari district, a village in Andhra Pradesh, India
- Pandalapaka, Visakhapatnam district, a village in Andhra Pradesh, India

== See also ==
- Pandalam (disambiguation)
