= Pandalam (disambiguation) =

Pandalam is a city in Pathanamthitta, Kerala

It may also refer to:

- Pandal, a temporary Hindu religious structure
- Pandalam Bridge, a bridge situated in Pandalam junction
- Pandalam Bypass, a proposed road project in Pandalam
- Pandalam Suspension Bridge, a pedestrian suspension bridge in Pandalam
- Pandalam KSRTC Bus Station, a transport hub in Pandalam
- Pandalam Municipality, the civic body that governs Pandalam
- Pandalam dynasty, early dynasty in Kerala
- Pandalam Kerala Varma, Indian activist and poet
- Pandalam Sudhakaran, Indian politician
- Pandalam Palace, a royal palace in Kerala
- Pandalam Mahadeva Temple, a temple situated in Pandalam
- Pandalam Thekkekara, a village in Kerala

== See also ==
- Pandalapaka (disambiguation)
- Pandalur, a town in Pandalur taluk, Tamil Nadu, India
- Pandalur taluk, a taluk (sub-district) in Nilgiris district, Tamil Nadu, India
