= KSRTC Terminal Complex Thiruvalla =

Bus station in Kerala, India

KSRTC Bus Terminal Complex Thiruvalla കെ എസ് ആർ ടി സി ബസ് ടെർമിനൽ കോംപ്ലക്സ് തിരുവല്ല
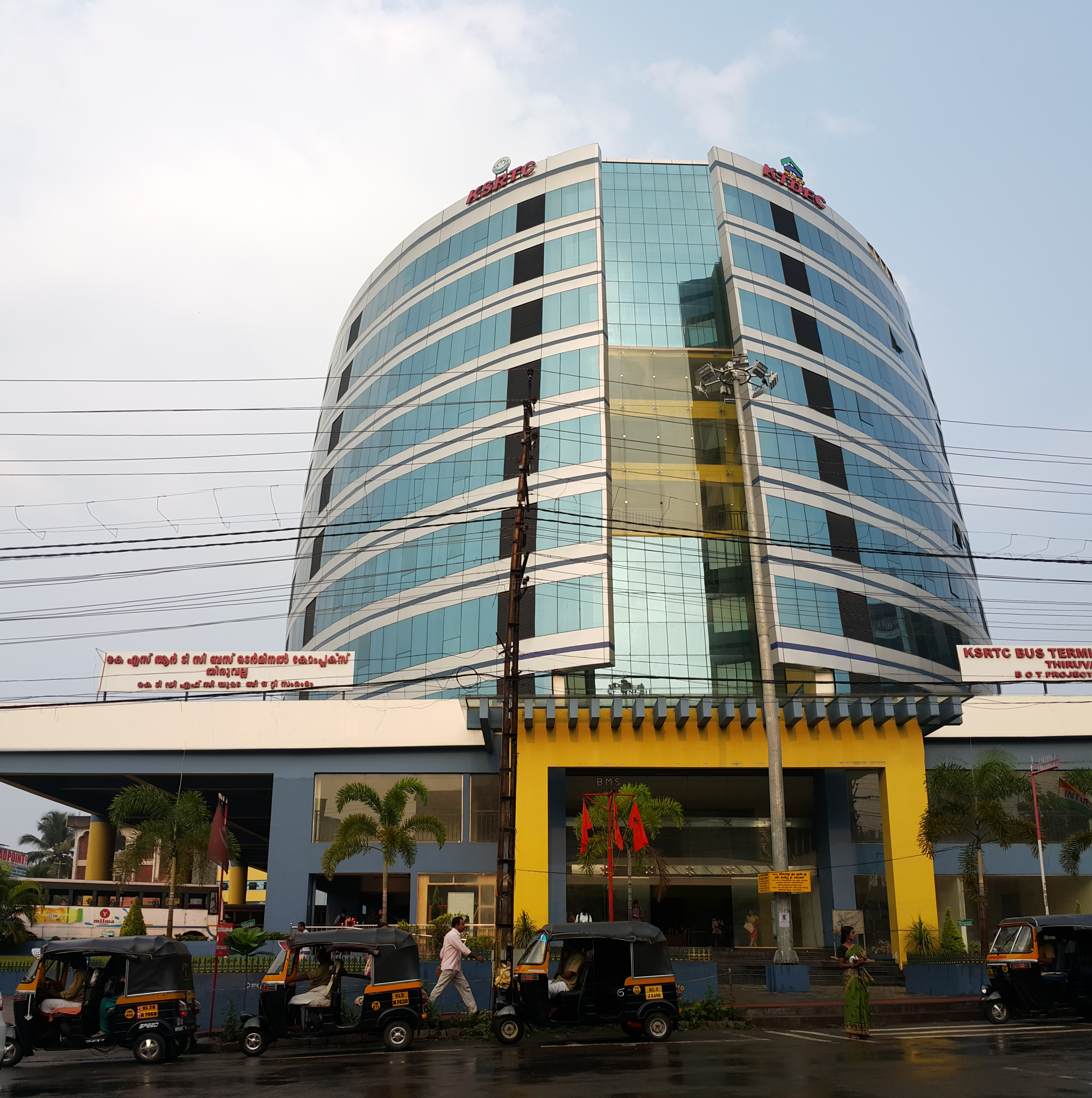

General information
- Location: Thiruvalla, Kerala; India
- Coordinates: 9.3866721°N 76.5747050°E
- Transit authority: KSRTC
- Platforms: 16 Bus Bays
- Bus operators: List: KSRTC; KURTC; TNSTC; KSRTC SWIFT

Construction
- Structure type: Below-grade
- Parking: Yes (2 basement floors)
- Accessible: ♿️ Wheelchair access
- Architect: Koshy P. Alex
- Architectural style: Modern
Location
- Phone: 0469-2602945

KSRTC Bus Terminal Complex Thiruvalla is a transport hub located in the Thiruvalla town in the Indian state of Kerala, owned and operated by Kerala State Road Transport Corporation (KSRTC) under its south zone with depot code TVL. It is located near SCS Junction and is accessible via NH 183. It is one of the four BOT projects of KSRTC under KTDFC (others are in Angamaly, Kozhikode and Thampanoor).

It offers services to Ernakulam via both NH 183 (along Kottayam and Ettumanoor) and NH 66 (along Alappuzha and Cherthala) and towards state capital Thiruvananthapuram via SH-1 (along Kottarakkara and Kilimanoor). Long Distance transit includes Guruvayur, Kozhikode, Palakkad and Thrissur. Inter-state transit includes Bangalore, Coimbatore, Madurai, Tenkasi and Tirunelveli.

== History ==
In 2006, the then Transport Minister and incumbent MLA of Thiruvalla, Mathew T. Thomas started a few bus terminal projects across the state. Work on the Thiruvalla terminal took off in August 2010. As part of this, KSRTC depot of Thiruvalla shifted operations temporarily to a ground near the Municipal Stadium. The project was a joint venture of Kerala State Road Transport Corporation and the Kerala Transport Development Finance Corporation (KTDFC) on Build–operate–transfer method. Mumbai-based Naresh Builders undertook the project based on the design by the Thiruvananthapuram-based architect Koshy P. Alex of Vasthushilpalaya. KTDFC initially set the target completion date at August 31, 2013; however, this got delayed by two years due to political reasons. The project was completed and opened to public on June 6, 2015.

== Overview ==
The modern bus terminal-cum-shopping mall built at a cost of ₹41.38 crores is 12 storied and has a total plinth area of nearly 19,000 m^{2} (200,000 sq ft). It features two basement floors exclusive for parking purposes and the ground floor acting as platforms. All other 9 elevated floors is designated for commercial purposes. Unlike the original plan, the top two floors have been made into two multiplexes. However, the complex is not centrally air-conditioned, making it less attractive for major business groups and commercial usage.

The bus terminal has 16 bus bays having a plinth area of 1,508.4 m^{2} (16,236 sq ft). The ground floor also has the KSRTC office, police aid-post, security personnel's room, cloak room, canteen and a few shops. A separate 4 storey building that houses garage, administrative office and retiring rooms for the staff is also constructed on the 12,000 m^{2} (2.96 acres) premises. The terminal is now enabled with free public Wi-Fi access as part of the K-Fi project of the state government.

== Platforms ==
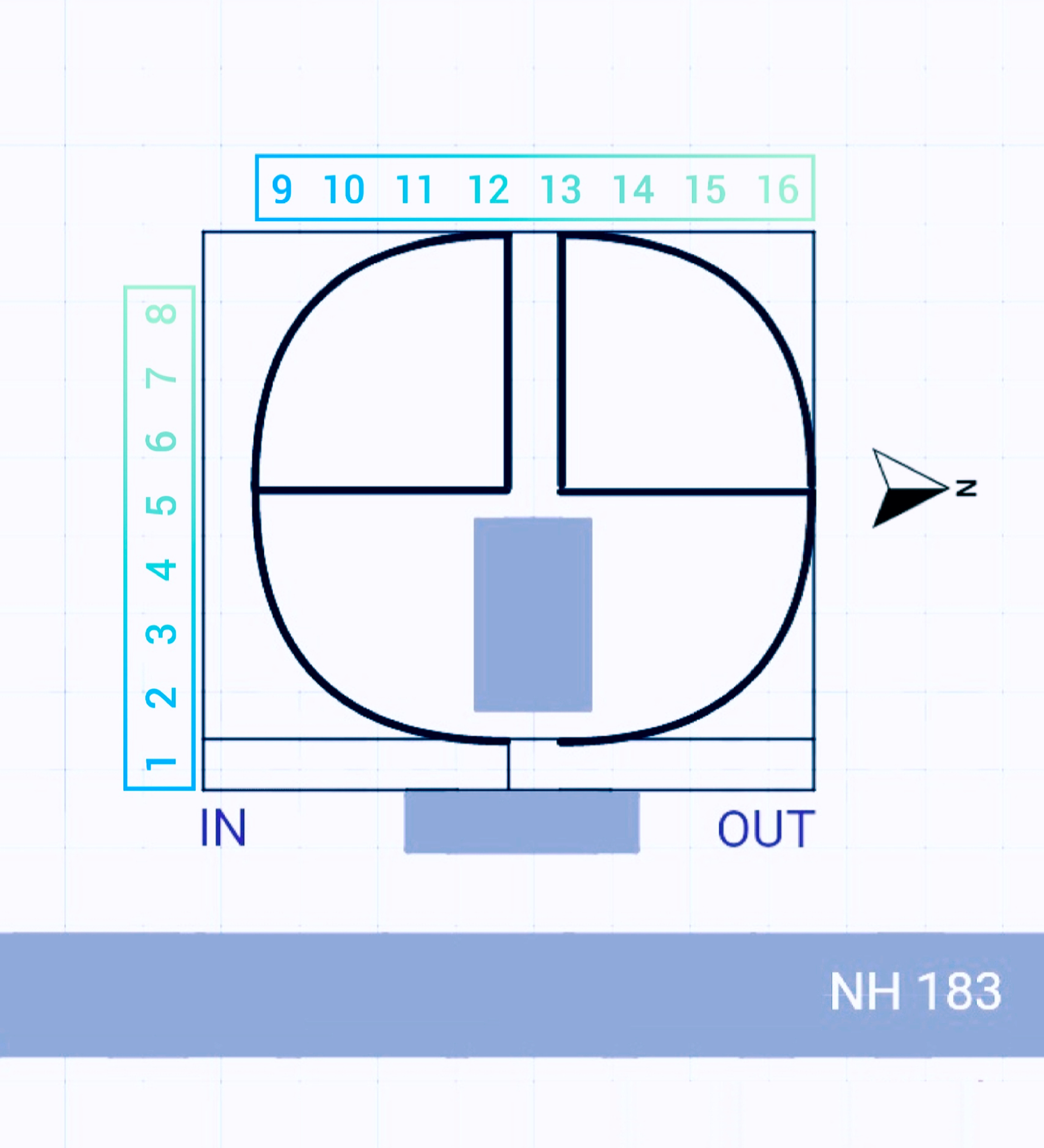
Platform positions at the terminal complex (unruled)

| Sl. No | Platform(s) | Note | Destination(s) served |
|---|---|---|---|
| 1. | PF 1 PF 2 | | Towards Mallapally, Paippad, Kunnamthanam, Kallooppara, Chunkappara. |
| 2. | PF 3 PF 4 | (Bypass Rider Slot) | Towards Changanassery, Kottayam, Vyttila, Ernakulam, Thrissur, Malampuzha, Vazhikkadavu, Palakkad, Kozhikode, Guruvayur, Coimbatore (Inter-State). |
| 2. | PF 5 PF 6 | (Bypass Rider Slot) | Towards Changanassery, Kottayam, Vyttila, Ernakulam, Thrissur, Malampuzha, Vazhikkadavu, Palakkad, Kozhikode, Guruvayur, Coimbatore (Inter-State). |
| 3. | PF 7 PF 8 | | Towards Alappuzha, Chakkulathukavu Temple, Edathua, Haripad, Ambalappuzha, Ernakulam (via Alappuzha). |
| 4. | PF 9 | | Towards Bangalore, Madurai, Tenkasi (as Inter-State services). |
| 5. | PF 10 PF 11 | | Towards Parumala, Mannar, Karunagappalli, Mavelikkara, Chettikulangara, Kayamkulam, Kollam, Thiruvananthapuram (via Kollam). |
| 6. | PF 12 PF 13 | (Bypass Rider Slot) | Towards Punalur, Kozhencherry, Pathanamthitta, Konni, Pathanapuram. |
| 7. | PF 14 PF 15 | (Bypass Rider Slot) | Towards Chengannur, Pandalam, Adoor, Kottarakkara, Kilimanoor, Chadayamangalam, Thiruvananthapuram (via Kottarakkara). |
| 8. | PF 16 | | Towards Ranni, Eraviperoor, Vennikulam, Thadiyoor. |

(also based on information collected on-site in 2022)

== Gallery ==
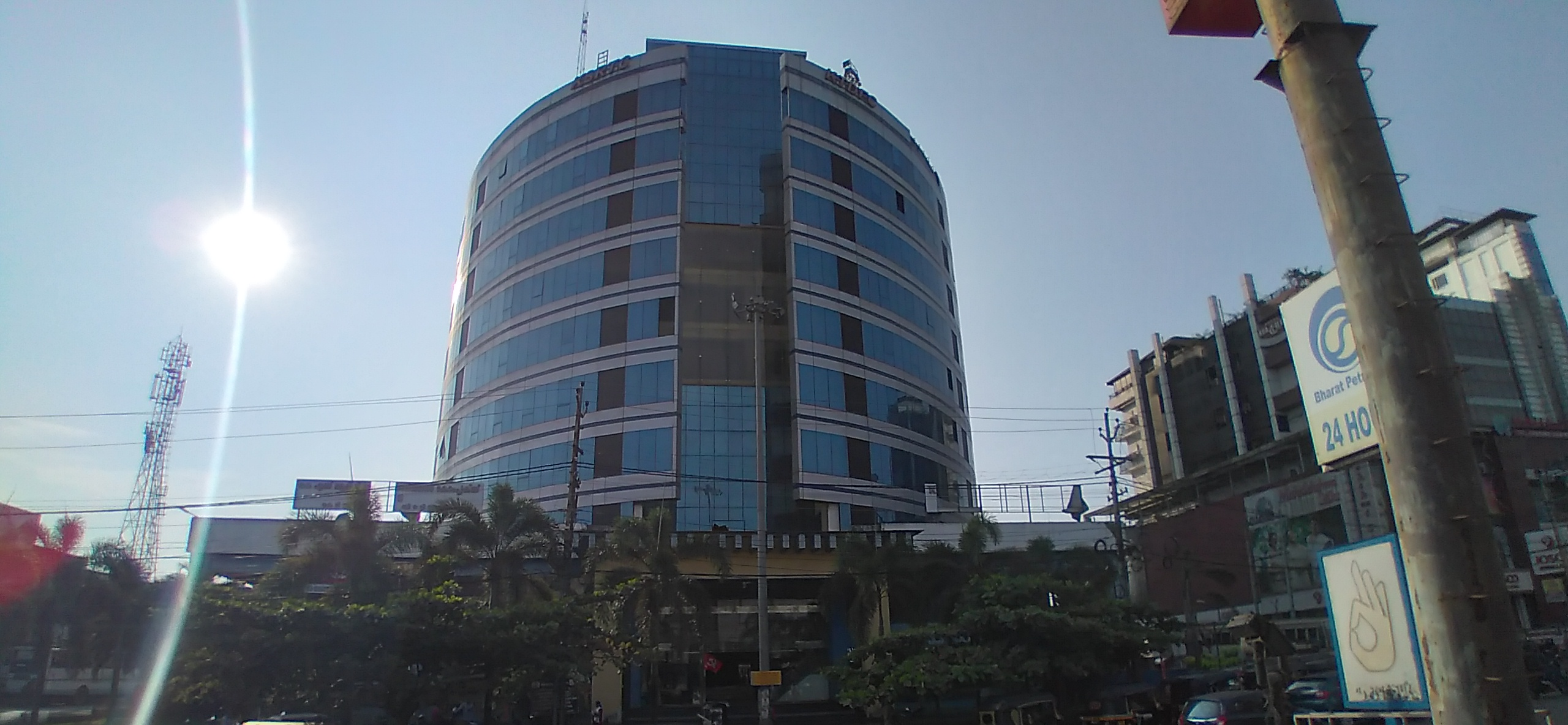
Facade of the Terminal Complex.

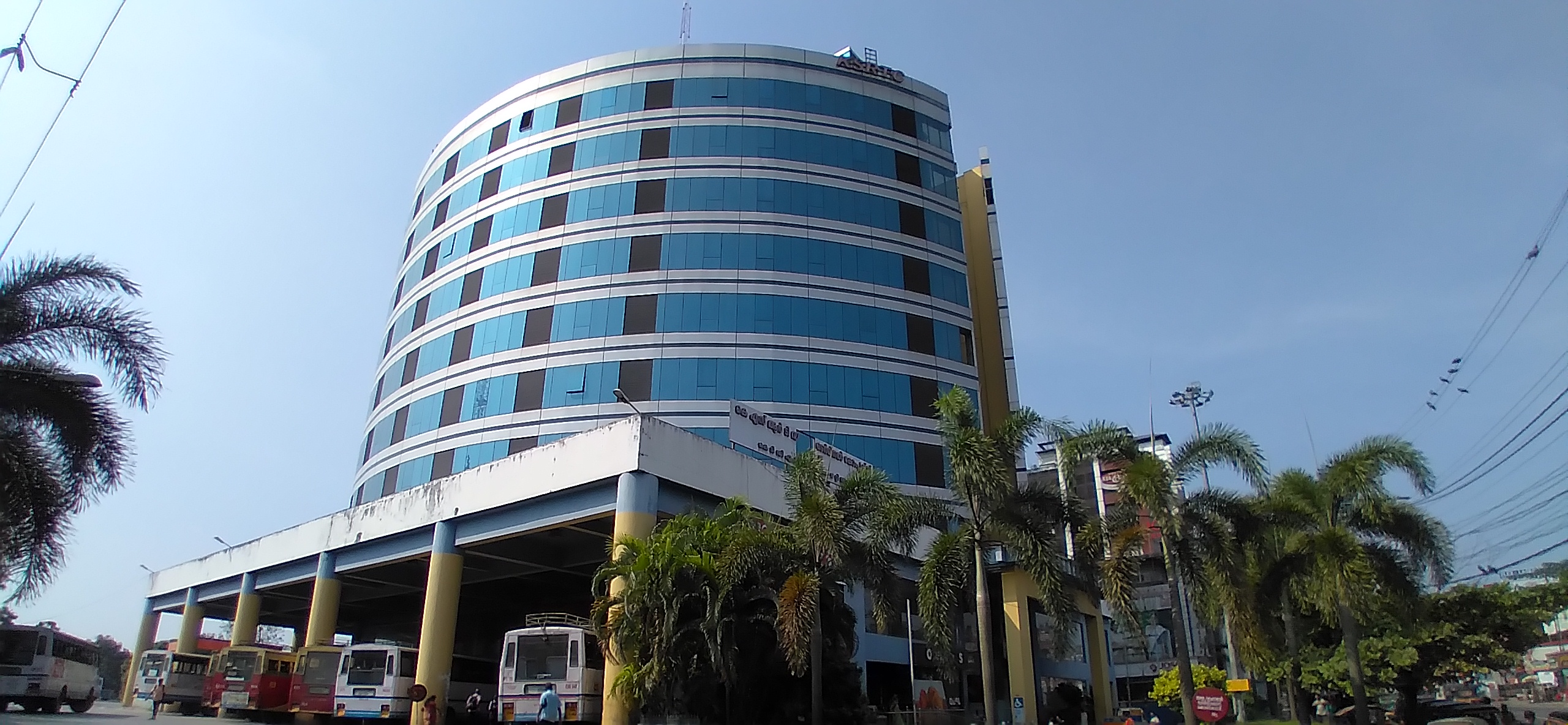
South side view of the Terminal Complex.

VOLVO 8400 Bus of KURTC departing from KSRTC Thiruvalla.

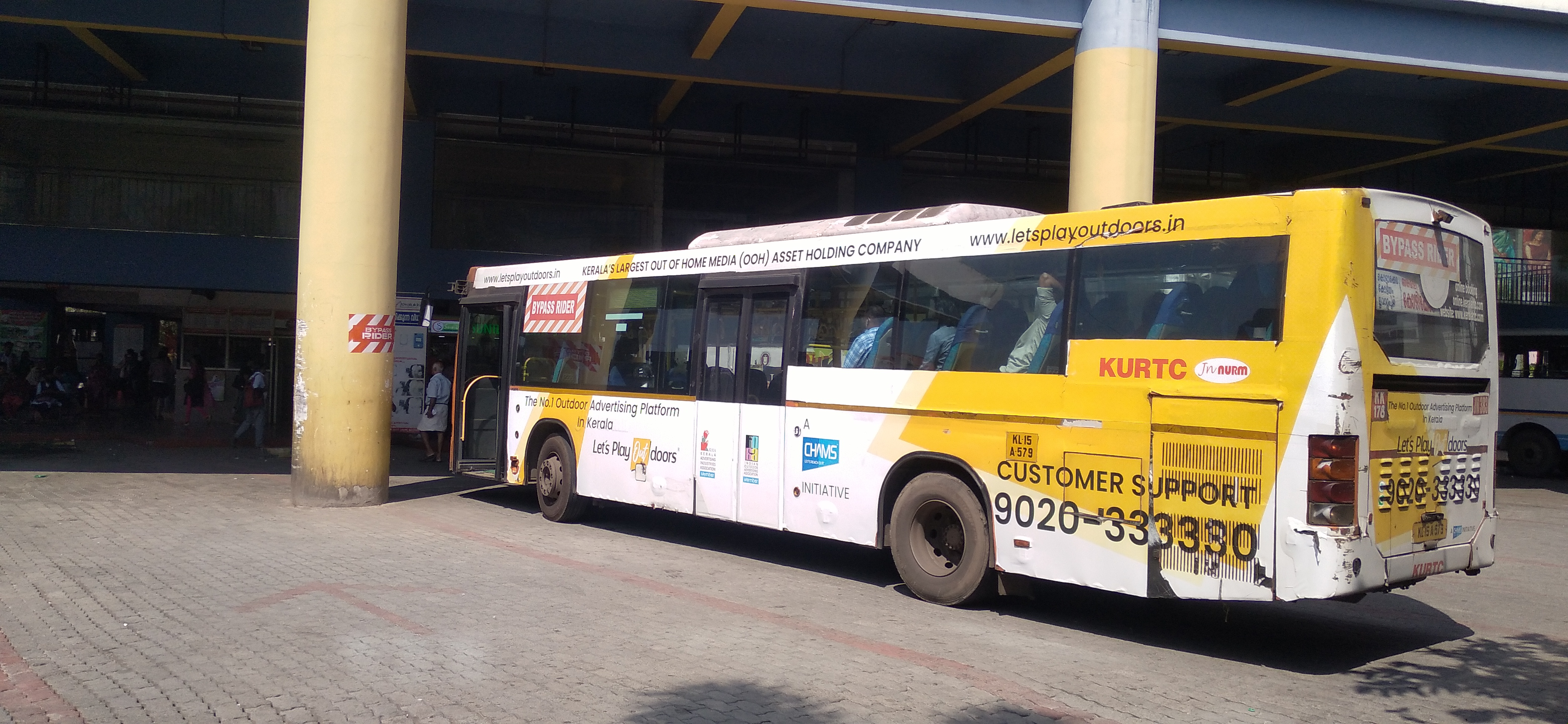
VOLVO 8400 Bus of KURTC departing from its slot in Platform 6.

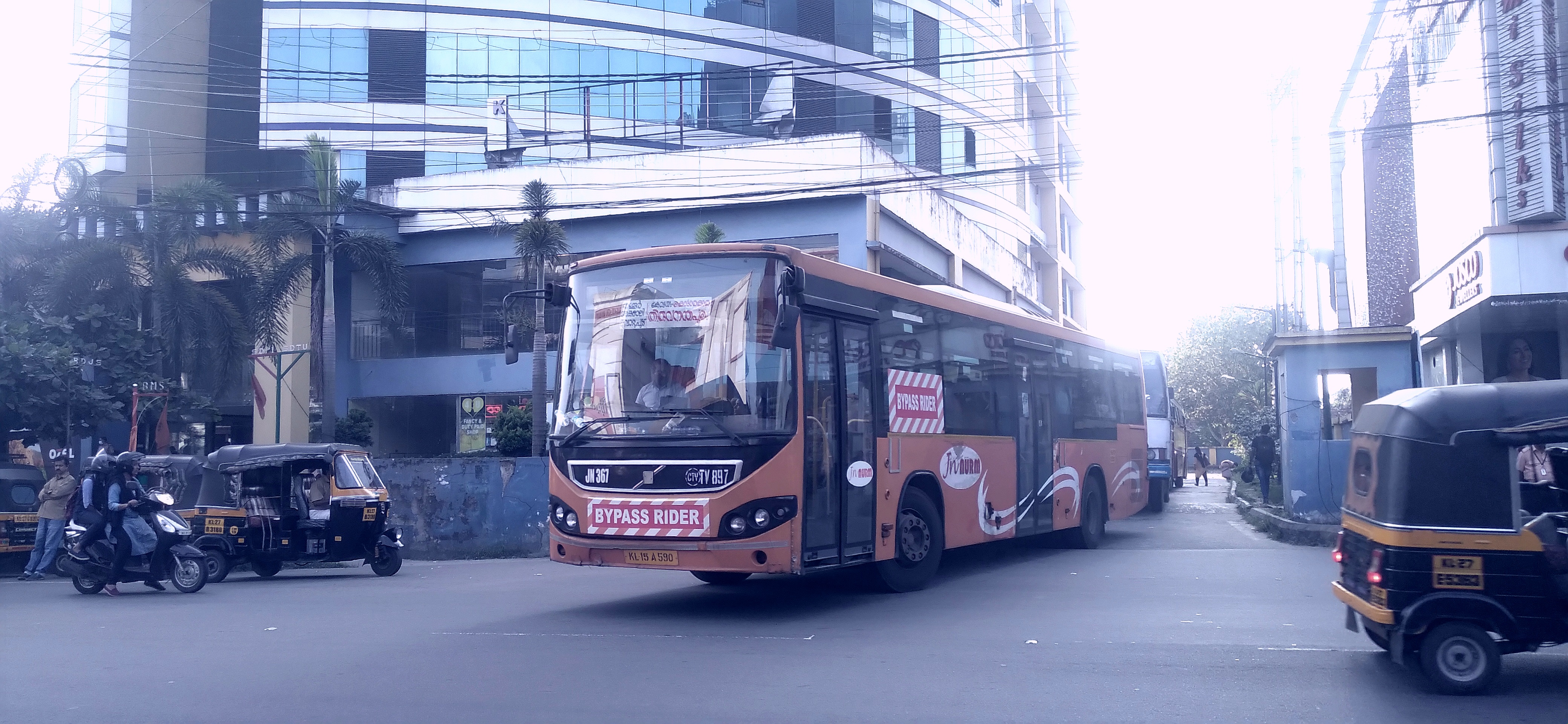
Bus towards Thiruvananthapuram Central exiting the Terminal.

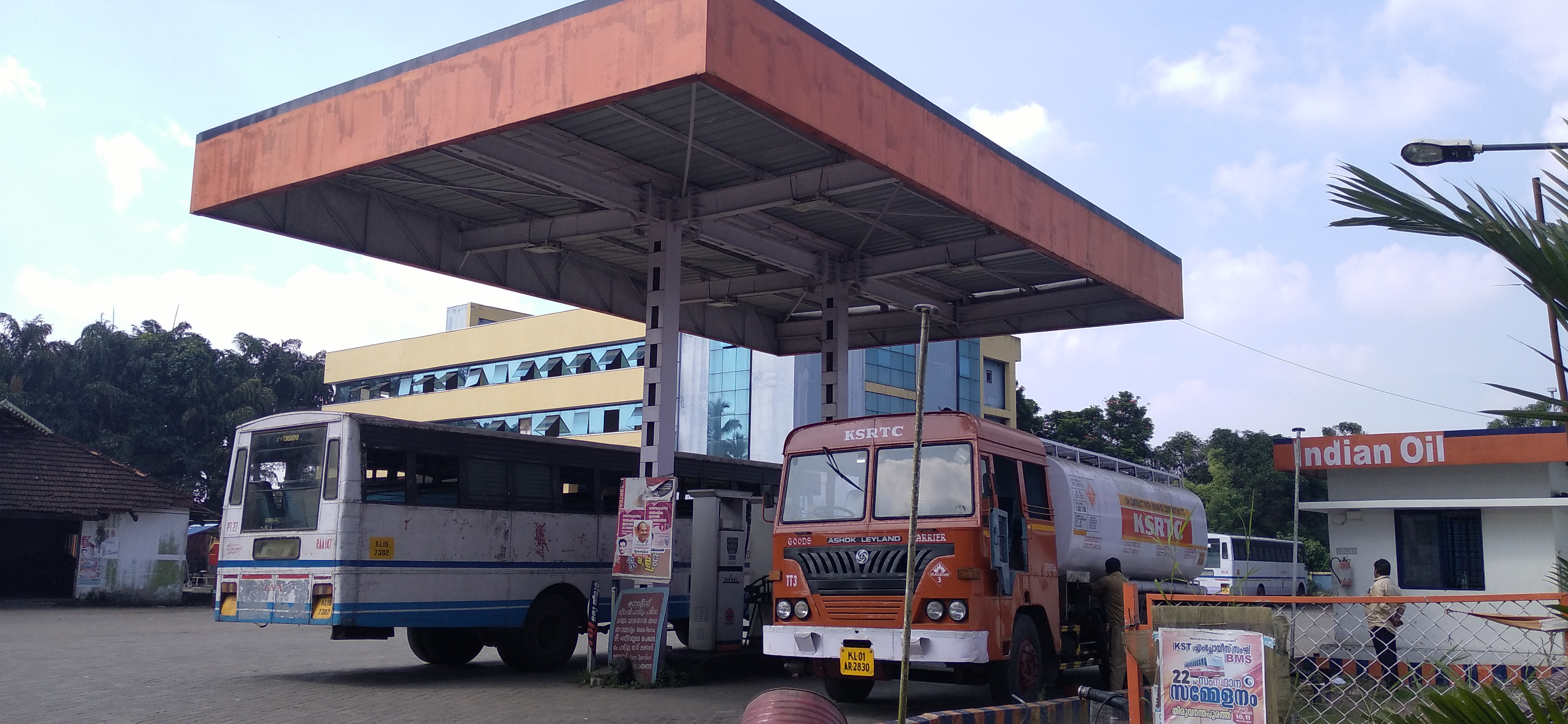
Inbuilt pump of Indian Oil. Administrative Office in background.

== See also ==
- KSRTC
- Transport in Kerala
- Vyttila Mobility Hub
- Thampanoor bus station
- Pandalam KSRTC Bus Station
- Thavakkara Bus Terminal Kannur
