= Thullal =

Thullal may refer to:

- Kolam Thullal, a ritual dance form prevalent in south Kerala, India
- Ottan Thullal, an art form in Kerala state, India
- Sarpam Thullal (Dance of Snakes), a ritual dance in Kerala, India
- Thullal (film), a 2007 Indian adult drama film written and directed by Praveen Gandhi
