= Othera Puthukulangara Bhagawathi Temple =

Hindu Temple in Othera, Kerala

Othera Puthukulangara Devi Temple is an ancient Hindu temple situated in the Othera village of Thiruvalla Taluk in Pathanamthitta district, Kerala, India, that is dedicated to the goddess, Durga Devi. The temple is owned by A Trust and an elected committee administrates the temple. The nearest town is Chengannur.

This temple is one among the thirty Durga temples of Central Kerala where the ancient Dravidian ritualistic art form Padayani is performed annually. The ritual Padayani is seen in temples situated in places such as 'Pathanamthitta, Kozhencherry, Aranmula, Ranni, Thiruvalla and Chengannur.

Kolam Thullal is the vital part of Padayani festival in which impersonations and apparitions of both divine and evil characters are painted on areca palm sheaths in traditional designs using natural dyes and performing them at these temples. Traditional artists create masks and trained dancers dance carry them on their head, and this is manifested to propitiate goddess Bhadrakali Devi.

There are many varieties of Kolam and 'Yakshi, Pakshi, Madan, Marutha, Kalan Kolam (Kalari), Bhairavi and more are all performed here. 'Valia Kolam' which is big size Bhairavi Kolam (a fierce form of Bhadrakali Devi) and another giant variety known as 'Chattathel Kolam', are also usually manifested here on the last day of the festival. Chattathel Kolam uses 1001 areca sheaths and cannot be carried on the head but is pulled around the temple on hand carts and displayed in the temple compound thereafter. It's the only temple in the world which performs a kolam made of 1001 areca sheaths.

== Deities and sub-deities ==
Goddess Durga Devi is the presiding main deity. Mahadevan, Dharma Sastha, Ganapathy, Yakshiamma, Brahmmarakshas (serpent gods), Yakshiamma are also there.

== Offerings ==
Offerings at the temple include Archana, Pushpanjali, Ganapathy Homam, mahanivedyam Chathussatham, Payasam and many more. Kolam Thullal is also an offering during annual Padayani festival.

== Festivals ==
Padayani is the main festival which is celebrated for 10 days in the Malayalam month of Meenam (Mar-Apr) prior to Thiruvathira star day.

== See also ==
- Sreevaraham Lakshmi Varaha Temple, Thiruvananthapuram
- Anandavalleeswaram Temple, Kollam
