= Pothanpuram =

Village in Kottayam District, Kerala, India

Coordinates: 9.0928629°N 76.8365367°E

Pothanpuram or Pothenpuram is a location near Pampady, Kottayam district, Kerala, India.

== Access ==
Pothanpuram can be reached from Pampady town by Public & Private Transport System, KSRTC etc. Exactly Pothanpuram can be reached from Alampally, towards Manthuruthy Road. Pothanpuram is a hilly area.

== Pilgrim Center ==
Mainly the Pilgrim Centre of Orthodox Christians, as where Pampady Thirumeni tomb is here.
