= Chooral Adavi =

Folk ritual in Kerala, India

Chooral Adavi is a folk ritual in Kerala, India, that held as part of Padayani festival. It is reminiscent of the Narabali ritual of yore. It is usually conducted in temples and sacred groves.

In Chooral Adavi, devotees wrap themselves in fresh thorny cane and roll on the ground over and over.
