= Padayani thappu =

Type of indian frame drum

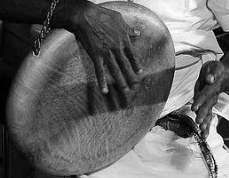

Percussion instrument
- Classification: Frame drum
- Hornbostel–Sachs classification: 211.311 (Directly struck membranophone)

The Patayani thappu is an Indian frame drum played with the hands. Thappu is used in the ritual art of Kerala known as Padayani, in which the drum accompanies stylized dance movements and provides percussive music in a rhythmic ensemble. Some of the rhythmic patterns performed are Champa, Kaarika, Kumba, Adantha and Marma. In devotional music it is usually accompanied by traditional cymbals called elathalam. Different rhythmic ensembles can be produced by blending thappu with chenda drum.

== See also ==
- Parai
