= Chunkappara =

- Town
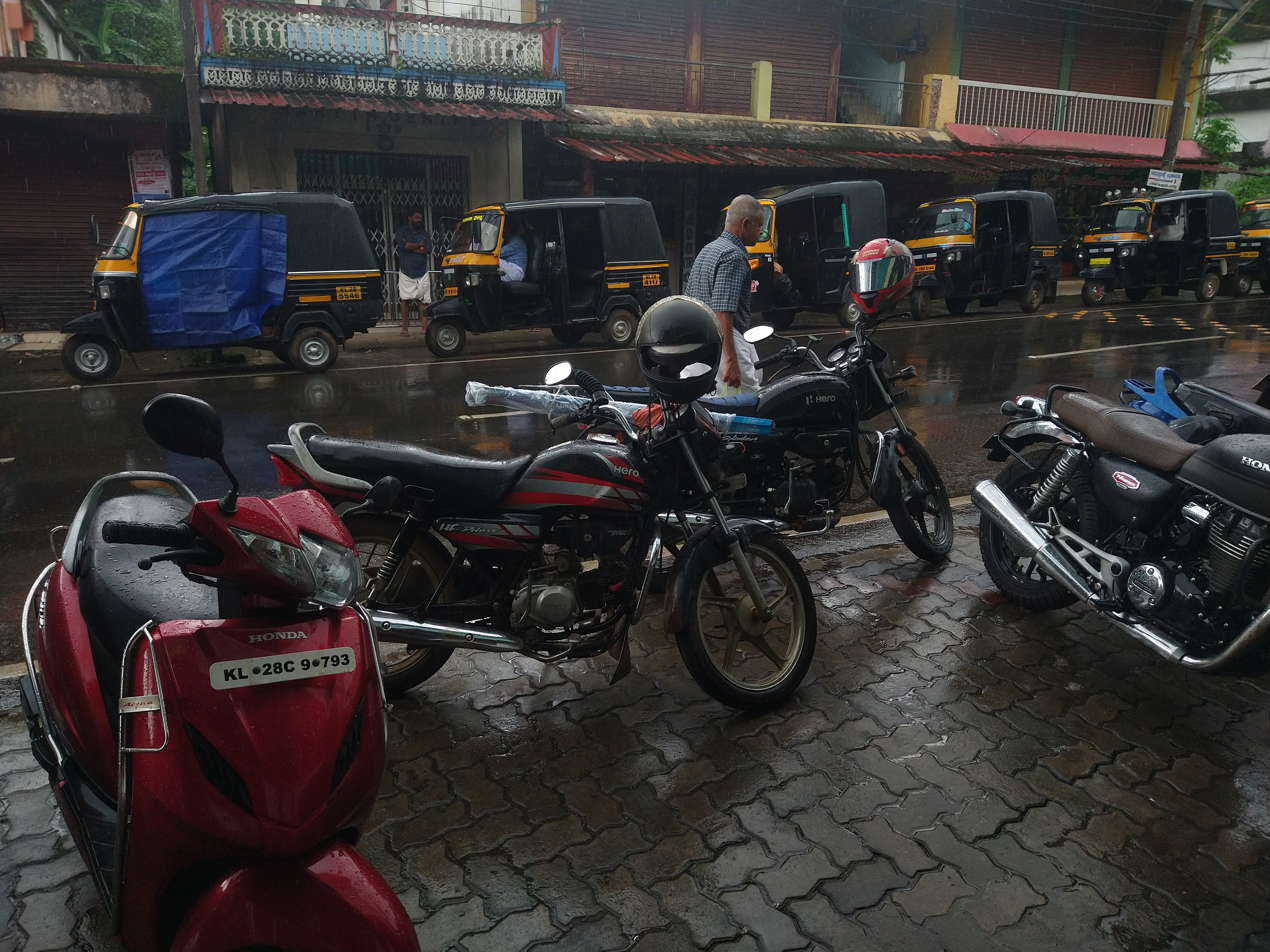
- Chunkappara in monsoon

- Location in Kerala, India Chunkappara (India)
- Coordinates: 9°27′13″N 76°44′38″E
- Country: India
- State: Kerala
- District: Pathanamthitta

Languages
  - Official: Malayalam, English
- Time zone: UTC+5:30 (IST)
- PIN: 686547
- Telephone code: 0469
- Vehicle registration: KL- 28
- Nearest city: Thiruvalla
- Lok Sabha constituency: Pathanamthitta

Chunkappara (ചുങ്കപ്പാറ) is a small town in the Pathanamthitta district of Kerala in South India. It comes under Kottangal Panchayat in Mallapally Taluk. Chunkappara is situated 26 km (16 mi) east of Thiruvalla, where the nearest railway station is. It is part of Thiruvalla Revenue Division. It comes under Ranni Assembly constituency and Pathanamthitta Lok Sabha constituency . Other neighbouring towns include Kanjirappally, Manimala, Ranny, Mallappally, Karukachal and Erumely.

== History ==
Historically, Chunkappara was a place surrounded by hilly terrain with prominent rock formations, in the middle of a forest.

People, mainly farmers from neighboring villages like Mallapally, Kozhencherry and Thiruvalla gradually took over the regional lands for agriculture. The fertile soil was good for crops like pepper, tapioca, coconut and later, rubber.

Before the area developed into the modern day town, the junction -where three village roads meet- was known as Ozhappukuzhi Kavala. As the area expanded around the historic tax collection post near a huge rock, the name Chunkappara gradually became the name of the centre ('chunkam' means tax and 'para' means rock).

Chunkappara was a part of the kingdom of Travancore (1753-1949) during the pre-independent era. Following independence, the area transitioned through three different districts. It was initially a part of Quilon (Now Kollam) district from 1949 to 1957. When Alleppey district(Now Alappuzha) was formed in 1957 the whole Thiruvalla taluk - which Chunkappara was then part of - was added to it. It remained under Allepey for 25 years. When Pathanamthitta district formed on November 1, 1982, Chunkappara was added to it where the area still being a part of.

chunkappara on a rainy day in August, 2026

Chunkappara market (ചുങ്കപ്പാറ ചന്ത) was established in 1933. By the early 50s, regular markets were held on every Tuesday and Friday. However, the infamous flood in 1958 affected Chunkappara severely which destroyed most of the commercial establishments and made market mostly inactive until 1960. A new chapter began in the early 60s as the textile, dried fish and tobacco trades earned a big consumer base. The timber business, started long back, reached the entire district by the early to mid-70s.

== Places to visit ==
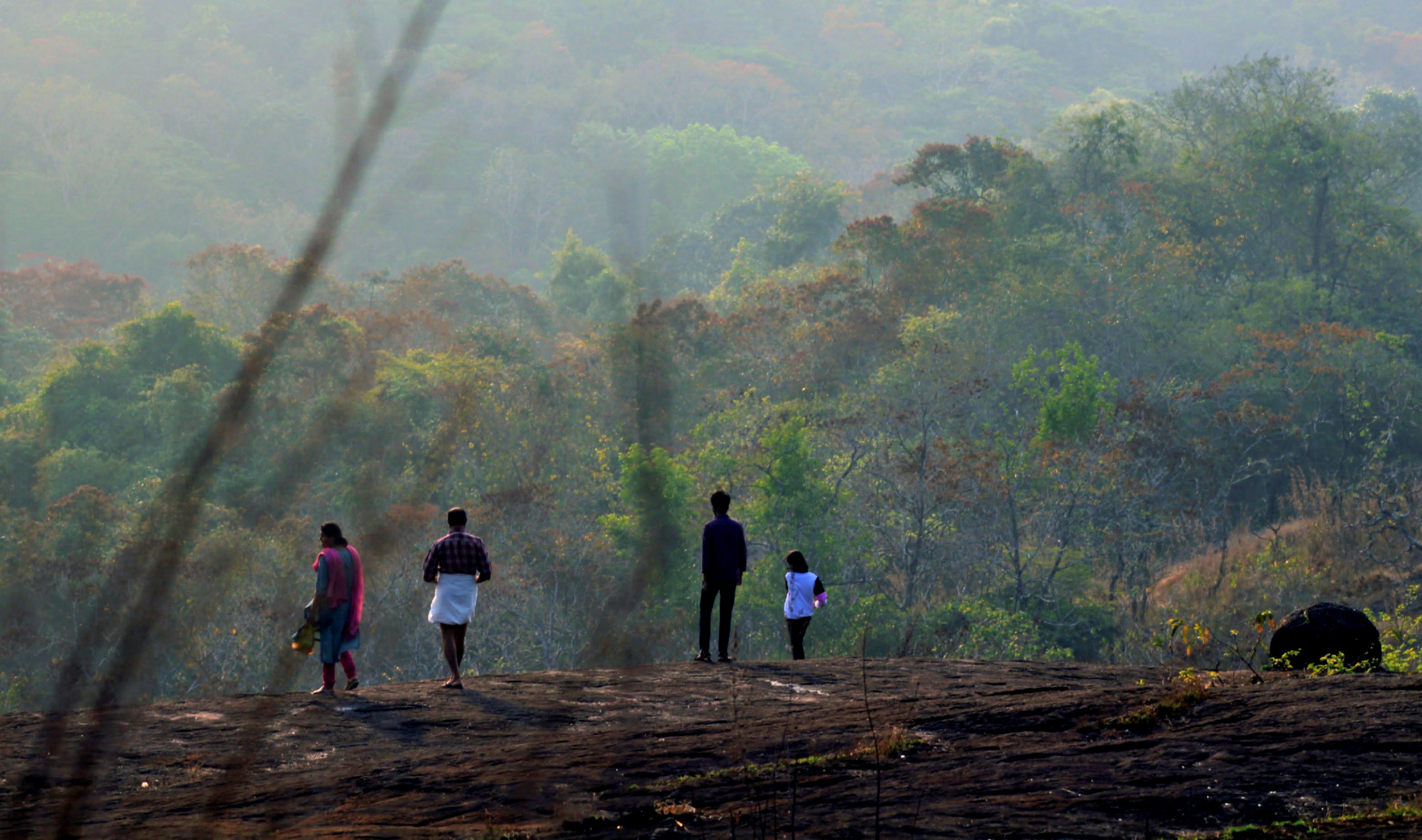
A cloudy day at Nagappara

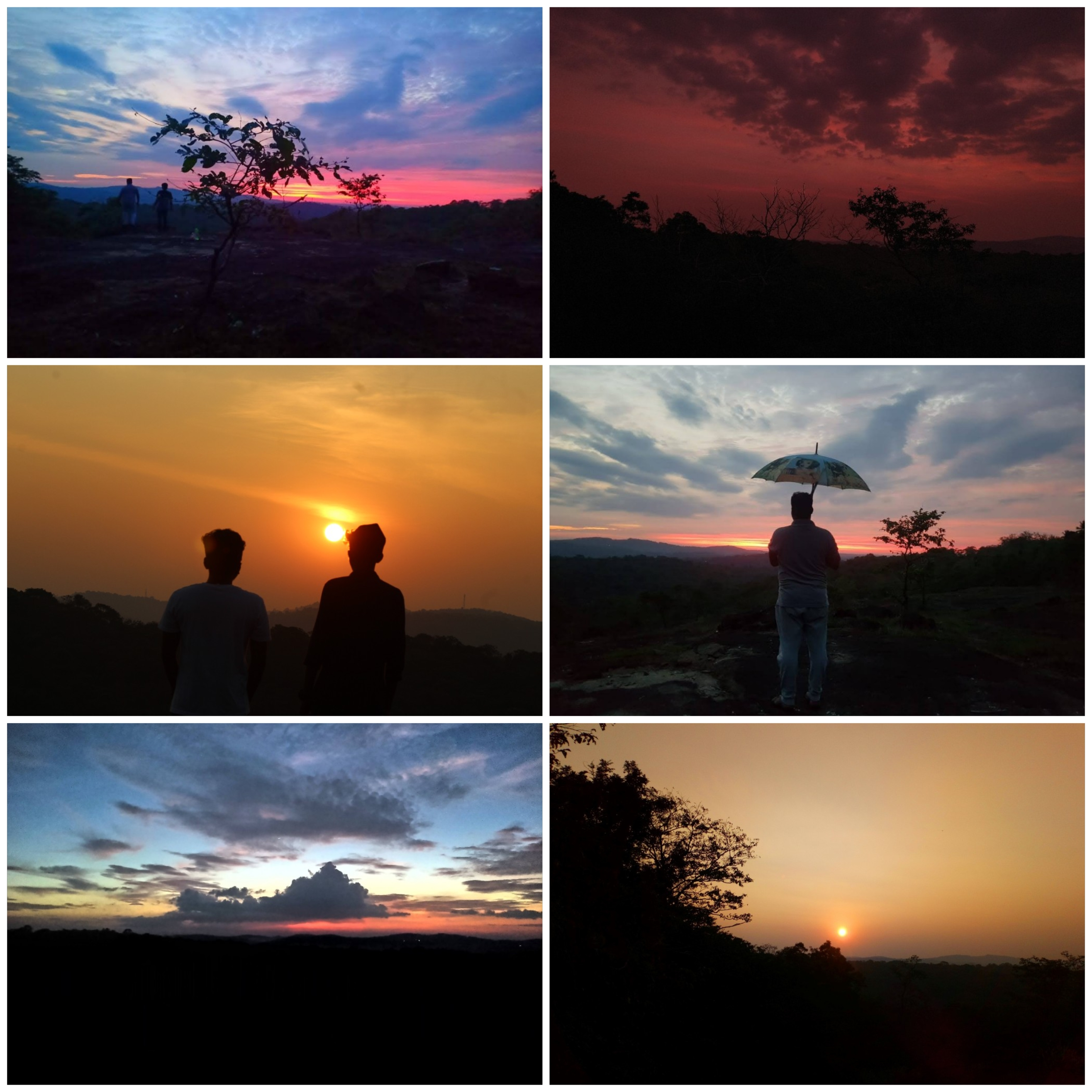
Sunsets at Nagappara

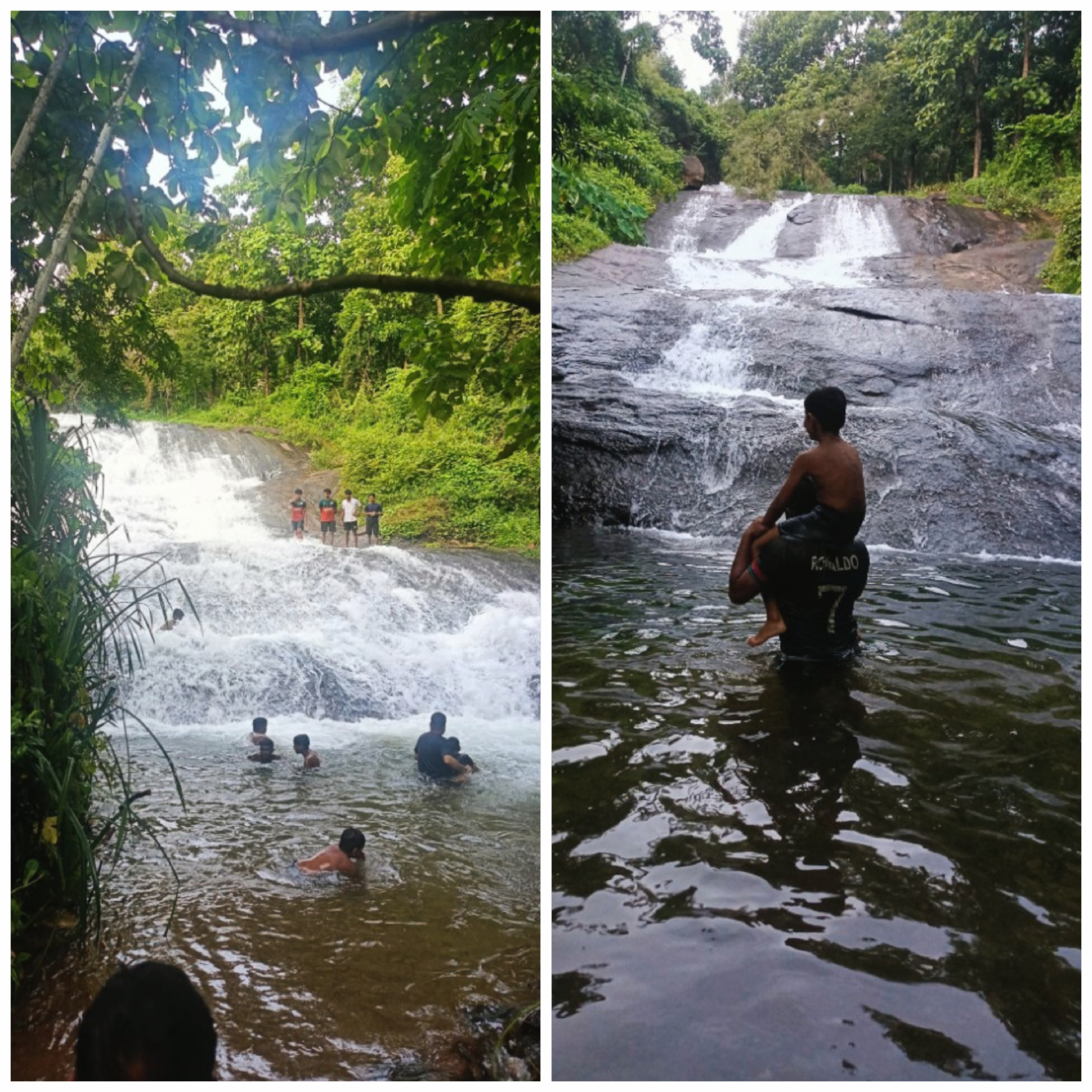
Orakkanpara waterfalls during monsoon

- Nagappara (നാഗപ്പാറ) - a cult favorite hilltop view point with acres of rock formations surrounded by thick forest located 3 kilometers away from Chunkappara at Nirmalapuram, Maramkulam.
- Orakkanpara (ഒരക്കൻപാറ) - a small waterfall just a kilometer away from Chunkappara in Kottangal route.
- Oottupara (ഊട്ടുപാറ) - another hilltop view point with a wide area of prominent rock within a forest atmosphere. It is about 3 kilometers towards Ponthenpuzha.

== Hospitals ==
1. Shareena Medical Centre,↵Ponthanpuzha road, Chunkappara

2. V care hospital, Central Junction, Chunkkapara

3. Government Hospital, ↵Thundiapara Junction, Kadikkavu Road, Chunkappara

4. Government Homeo Clinic, ↵Maramkulam-Perumpetty-Chalappally Road, Chunkappara

5. Pushpagiri Grama Hospital, Near St.George's HS, Chunkappara[4]

== Education institutions ==
- St. George HS Chunkappara
- St. Joseph High School, Kulathoor
- CMS LPS Chunkappara
- Alaprakkad govt Lps
- Kottangal govt Lps
- Al Hind public school
- Assisi Center, For Specially Abled Children.
- Christu Raja English Medium School
- Govt. LVLP school, Kulathoor (Pottamala)
- Govt. LP School, Kulathoor

== Banking Faculties ==
- SBI, Ponthanpuzha road, Chunkappara
- Federal Bank, Near Mannil Hypermarket, Maramkulam-Perumpetty-Chalapally road, Chunkappara
- Kerala Gramin Bank, Central Junction, Chunkappara
- Pathanamthitta District Co-operative Bank, Opp. SBI, Chunkappara
- KSFE Chunkappara, Near Mannil Hypermarket, Maramkulam-Perumpetty-Chalapally road, Chunkappara
