= Kollam Rameswaram Mahadeva Temple =

Hindu temple in India

Rameswaram Mahadeva Temple
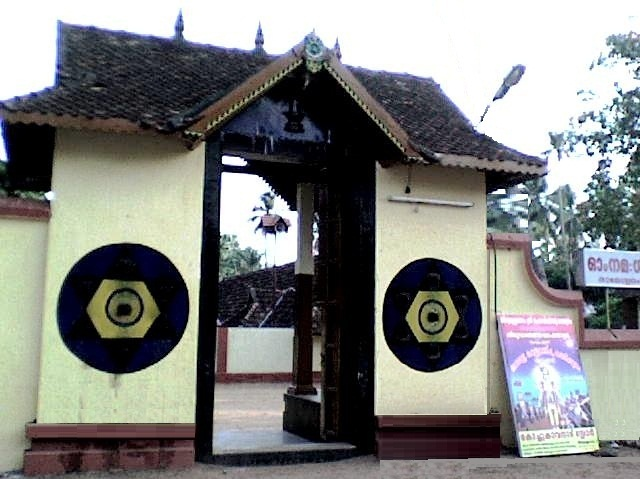
- Temple West Tower

- Rameswaram Mahadeva Temple, Thangassery, Kollam, Kerala

Religion
- Affiliation: Hinduism
- District: Kollam
- Deity: Shiva
- Festival: Maha Shivaratri

Location
- Location: Thangassery
- State: Kerala
- Country: India
- Interactive map of Rameswaram Mahadeva Temple
- Coordinates: 8°53′27.5″N 76°34′14.2″E

Architecture
- Type: Kerala style
- Completed: 12th century

Specifications
- Temple: One
- Monument: 1
- Inscriptions: 2
- Elevation: 29.49 m (97 ft)

Kollam Rameswaram Mahadeva Temple is located in the city of Kollam City in Kollam district, in Kerala, India. The presiding deity of the temple is Lord Rameswara facing west. It is believed that Kollam Rameswaram Mahadeva Temple is one of the 108 Shiva temples of Kerala and is installed by sage Parasurama dedicated to Shiva It is one of the two Rameswaram temples in 108 Shivalaya Sothram. The Amaravila Rameshwaram Sri Mahadeva Temple is the second Rameshwaram Temple. The temple is located in the village of Amaravila in Thiruvananthapuram District.

There are two small towers in the west and north sides of the temple. There is a Copper flag mast in front of Balikkal pura at west. The main sanctum sanitorium is in rectangular shape and the shrine is decorated with beautiful stone and wood carvings. Valiyambalam and Balakalpura are common in Kerala-Dravidian style.

== Location ==
This temple is located at an altitude of about 29.49 m above the mean sea level with the geographic coordinates of 8°53′27.5″N 76°34′14.2″E.

== Inscriptions ==
- A pillar erected in the courtyard of the Rameswaram Temple bears a royal order issued by Rama Kulasekhara, the 12th-century Chera ruler of Kerala.

== Subdeities ==
- Ganesha
- Subrahmanya
- Dharma Sastha
- Snake goddess
- Rakshas
- Navagraha
- Krishna

== See also ==
- 108 Shiva Temples
- Temples of Kerala
- Amaravila Rameswaram Sri Mahadeva Temple
- Anandavalleeshwaram Sri Mahadevar Temple
- 108 Shiva Temples
- Temples of Kerala
- Amaravila Rameswaram Sri Mahadeva Temple
- Anandavalleeshwaram Sri Mahadevar Temple
