= Amaravila Rameswaram Sri Mahadeva Temple =

Ancient Hindu temple in Kerala, India

- അമരവിള രാമേശ്വരം മഹാദേവക്ഷേത്രം
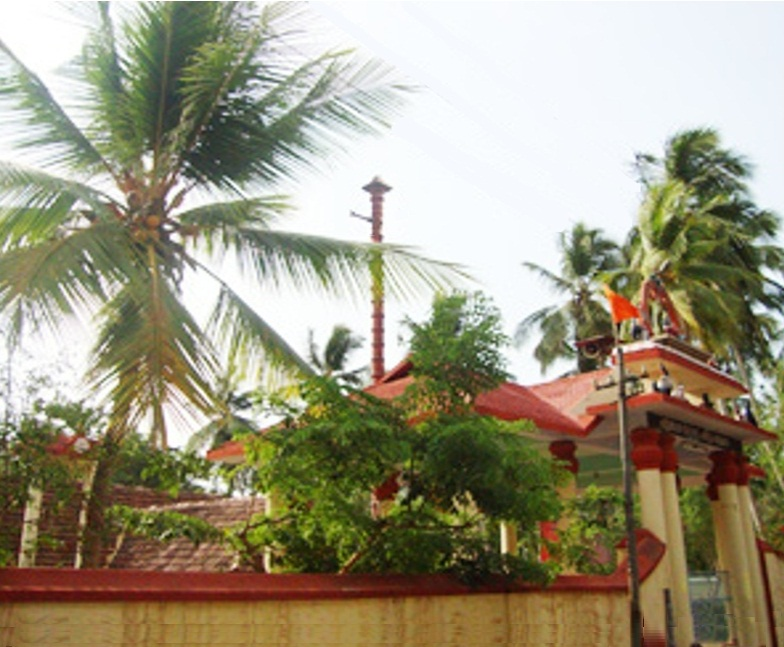
- Temple West Tower

- Rameswaram Sri Mahadeva Temple, Amaravila, Neyyattinkara, Thiruvananthapuram, Kerala

Religion
- Affiliation: Hinduism
- District: Thiruvananthapuram
- Deity: Shiva
- Festival: Maha Shivaratri

Location
- Location: Amaravila, Neyyattinkara
- State: Kerala
- Country: India
- Coordinates: 8°23′56.4″N 77°05′39.8″E

Architecture
- Type: Kerala style

Specifications
- Temple: One
- Monument: 1
- Elevation: 37.34 m (123 ft)

Amaravila Rameswaram Sri Mahadeva Temple , an ancient Hindu temple dedicated to Shiva is situated on the banks of the Neyyar (river) at Amaravila of Neyyattinkara (tehsil) in Thiruvananthapuram District in Kerala state in India. The presiding deity of the temple is Lord Rameswara facing west. It is believed that Amaravila Rameswaram Sri Mahadeva temple is one of the 108 Shiva temples of Kerala and is installed by sage Parasurama dedicated to Shiva. The temple is located 1 km away from Neyyattinkara town in Amaravila village.

It is one of the two Rameswaram temples in 108 Shivalaya Sothram. The Kollam Rameshwaram Mahadeva Temple is the second Rameshwaram Temple. The temple is located in the town of Kollam.

== Architecture ==
The temple is an example of regional sacred design. The Shiva Lingam faces East, while a Goddess Parvati faces West within the same sanctum sanctorum (Sreekovil). Local tradition believed that the murti was installed by Bhagavan Sri Rama, giving the temple its name, "Rameswaram". Lord Ganapati is located on the right side of the sanctum sanctorum (Sreekovil).

== Festival ==
A 10-day celebration in the month of Dhanu (December–January) that concludes with the Arattu ritual on the Thiruvathira Nakshatra day. Mahashivratri is a major event where Pongala is offered to Goddess Parvati. The temple is highly famous for pitru tarpanam (ancestral rites) performed in the Neyyar River during the month of Karkidakam.

== See also ==
- 108 Shiva Temples
- Temples of Kerala
- Kollam Rameswaram Mahadeva Temple
