= Padayani =

Ritual art performed in Kerala, India

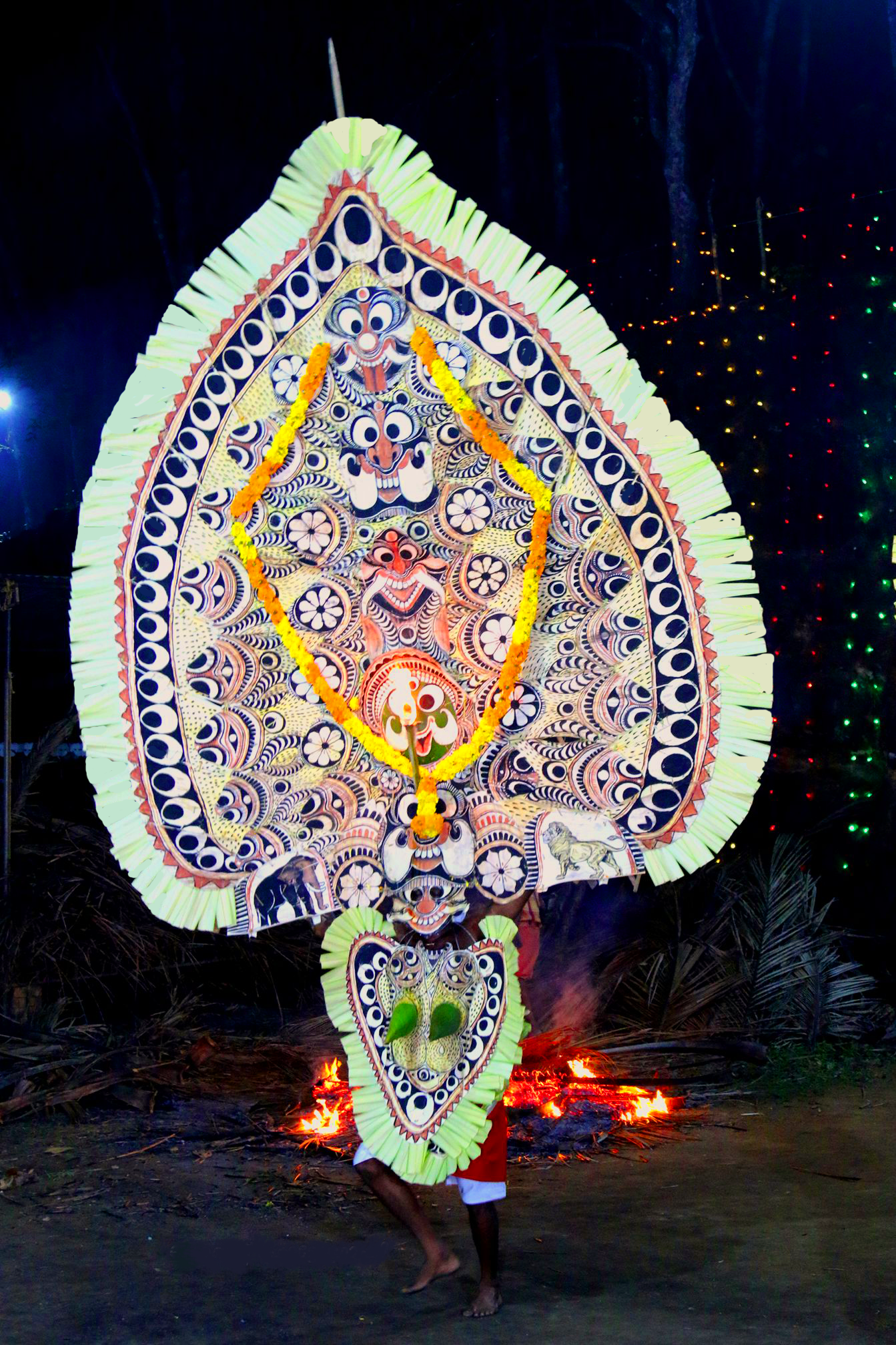
Alapra Thacharickal Padayani 64 Pala Bhirairavikolam

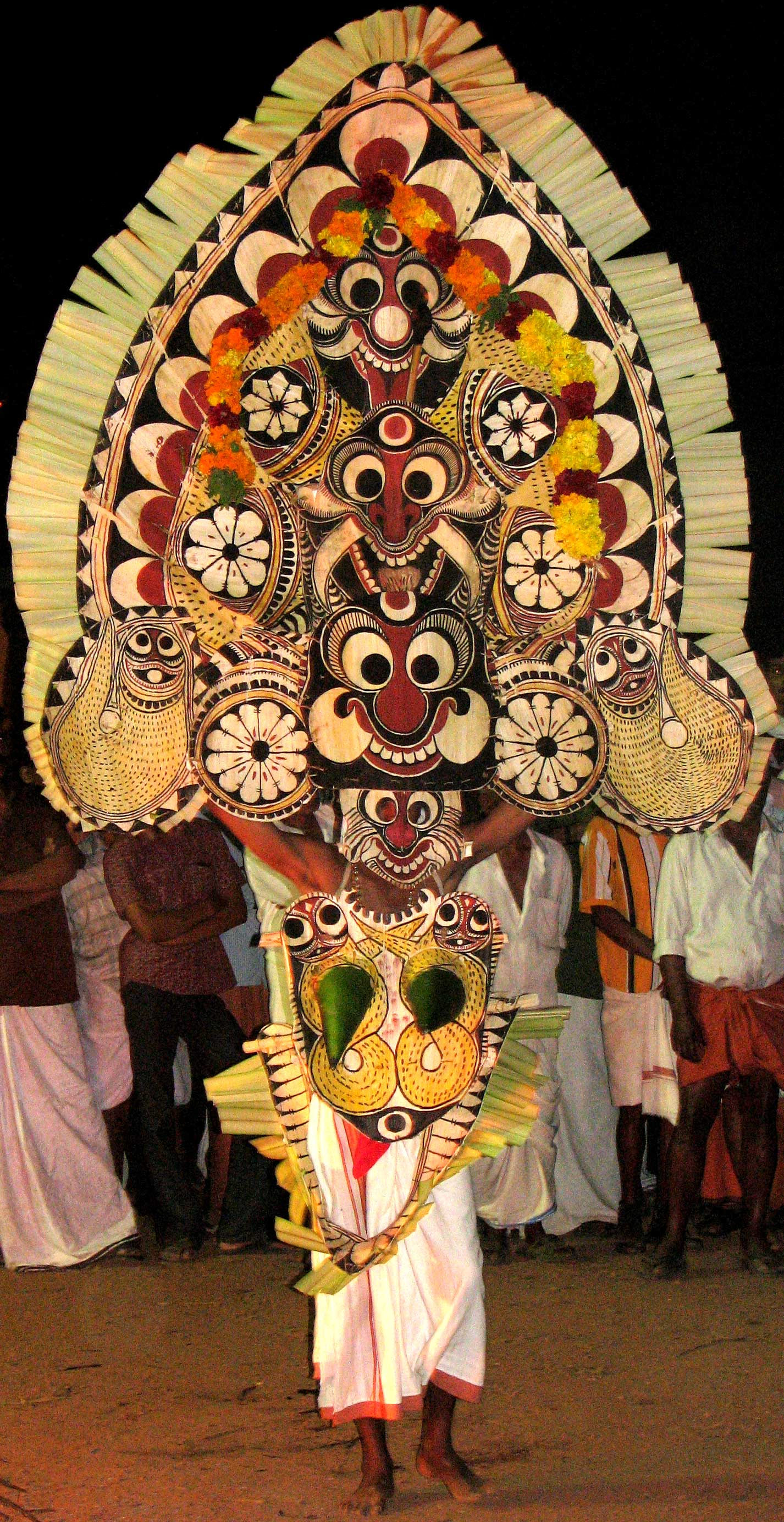
A masked Padayani dancer at the Kottangal Devi Temple

Padayani, also known Padeni (from the Malayalam word for military formations), is a traditional folk dance and a ritual art from the central region of the Indian state of Kerala. A ceremonial dance involving masks, it is an ancient ritual performed in Bhagavati temples. The dance is performed in honor of Bhadrakaali. Literally meaning a 'row of warriors', Padayani is an art form that blends music, dance, theatre, satire, facial masks, and paintings. It is part of worship of Bhadrakali and is staged in temples dedicated to the goddess from mid-December to mid-May. Padayani is unique to central Travancore, comprising the Pathanamthitta and Kottayam districts of Kerala. It is also performed in adjoining regions of Kollam, Alappuzha districts.

It is sometimes interpreted as preserving elements of earlier regional worship traditions that later became integrated into broader Hindu practices. Padayani is similar to the Theyyam ritual seen in northern Kerala. The percussion instruments used in Patayani are patayani thappu, chenda, para and kumbham.

The padayani at Puthukulangara Devi Temple in Othera, is particularly famous. A Bhairavi kolam is on the last day of festival, for which 1001 barks of areca palm is used. The main festival is on nakshatra trdrah of Meena.

"Pachathappu" is the first Malayalam film based on Padayani. Pachathappu is written and directed by Anu Purushoth. It was nominated Kerala Film Critics Award for Best Art Film of 2020

== Etymology ==
The term Padayani originated from Malayalam words 'Pata' meaning military and 'ani' meaning preparation.

== History and Traditions of origin ==
The earliest inscription that mentions padayani is Talakkad inscription. It is dated back to 1024 CE. The inscription talks about the tax collected by village temple council and Chera king Rajasimha (Contemporary to Rajendra Chola) from christian traders of Manigramam settlement for conducting Padayani festival.

Padyani is a modern form of Kolam Thullal, a ritual dance, which had been performed by the ritual specialists who performed healing ceremonies addressing psychological and spiritual distress within a cultural framework (The Tinta endogamous section of Ganaka community). In olden days, this elaborate and expensive event was carried out to heal illnesses of psychological dysfunctions without any identifiable physical cause, and cases that seemed to be not amenable to medical modalities of intervention . This form of psychic or spiritual healing other wise known as Kolam Thullal, was solely designed, controlled and performed by the Tinta sub sect of the Ganaka community. The folk art, Padayani made its development from this dance performance, as a divine ritual tradition in association with festival occasions of Bhagavathy (Bhadrakaali) temples of Kerala.

Another version of its origin is related to the practice of ancient martial arts training in Kerala. Since the origin of term 'padayani' relates to military parade or rows of army, it is generally believed that it is evolved from a symbolic past reminiscent of the fencing march of the martial art (Kalari) by the Nair soldiers and their Kalari Asaans. Eventually the responsibilities of various functions related to this dance were divided and assigned among people of different communities. So the Nair folk became the performers of the modern form of Padayani art, but the right of writing lyrics, the design and making of elaborate costumes was vested with the Kaniyar people. Nowadays the modern form of Padayani is performed at many Devi temples in the southern region of Kerala, particularly in Pathanamthitta, Kottayam, Alappuzha and Kollam Districts.

== Design and performance ==
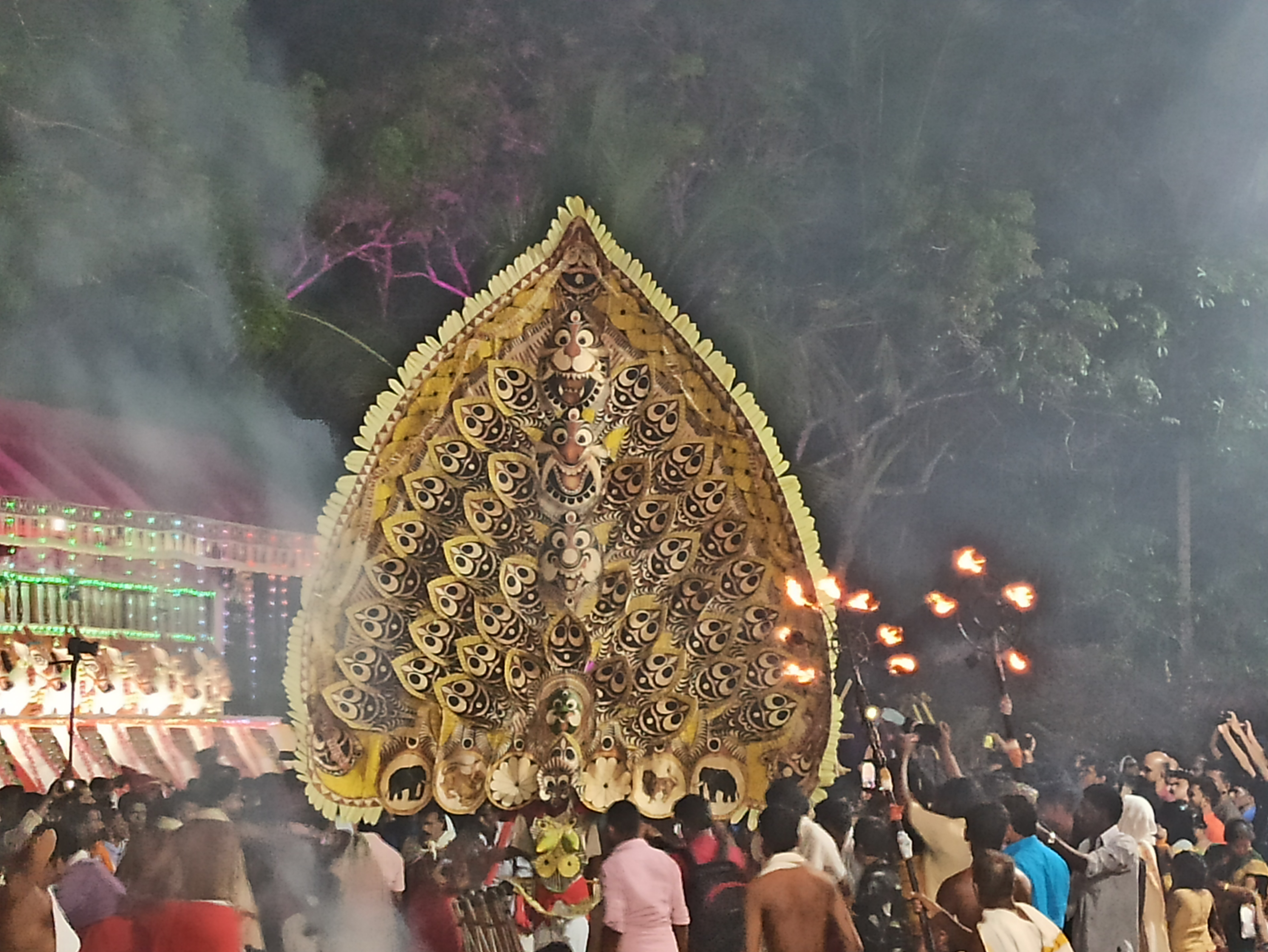
101 Pala Bhairavi Kolam

Padayani is very popular in Kerala, India, as a means, used to worship goddess Bhadra Kali.

After the kolam thullal dancing ends, there is ritual called Pooppada which is the end of the padayani festival. After that, the days of colours will be over and the colourful memories will be in the minds.

The waiting for the next padayani starts with a prayer for the wellness of all world.

In 2007, plans were put forward to implement a proposal by poet Kadammanitta Ramakrishnan to create a Padayani Village to promote the dance form. As of 2009, the first such village is expected to be built in the poet's hometown of Kadammanitta at a cost of Rs. 1.9 crore. A chief exponent of Padayani is Prof. Kadammanitta Vasudevan Pillai. His association and acquaintance with Kadammanitta Ramakrishnan has led to many literary contributions. His Literary work "Padayaniyude Paalakolangal" and "Padayani" is an authoritative work on Kerala Folklore with special reference to Padayani. In 2010, a padayani village was established at Kadammanitta, historically a major centre of padayani performances, with museums and tourist facilities to promote the form.

== Elanthoor Padayani ==
"Elanthoor Padayani" is being performed along with 8 days long Padeni maholtsavam at Elanthoor Bhagavathikunnu Devi Temple during February–March month of every year (Malayalam month of kumbam)(starts on makayiram naal). 8th day from makayiram naal is the grand padeni or Valya Padeni. Large crowd on valya padeni's procession is a main attraction follows kaappoli program. Main kolams are Ganapathi, Pishaachu, Sivakolam, Marutha, Koottamarutha, Rudra Marutha, Naayattu, Kuthira, Pakshi, Sundara Yekshi, Anthara Yekshi, Maya Yekshi, Arakki Yekshi, Erinaaga Yekshi, Maadan, Karinkkaali, Kaalankolam, Nina Bhairavi, Bhairavi, Kaanjiramaala and Mangala Bhairavi. Other performances include Velakali, Thaavadi, Pulavrittham, Pooppada and various types of Vinodhams such as Kaakkarashi Drama, Paradeshi, Sharkarakudam, Ammumma, Pattarum Pennum, Ooraali, Pulayan, Naadukaani, etc.

== Kottangal Padayani ==
"Kottangal Padayani" is being performed along with the 8 (Ettu padayani) days from a total of 28 days during January - February (Makara Bharani). This is performed every year at Kottangal Devi Temple located in the boundary of Kottayam and Pathanamthitta Districts. The last 8 days are important with the performance of different Kolams and other traditional programs. The padayani is done by two Karas (areas which contains different sub areas) Kottangal and Kulathoor. The Last 8 days are equally divided to two karas that is 4 for each. The last two days (Valiya Padayani) are most important for both Karas and they conduct programs in a competitive manner. Beautiful Processions will be there on the evening of last two days. The main programs include vela Kali, Adavi, Pallippana, Vellam Kudi, vinodam and kolam Thullal. The kolams performed in the padayani are Ganapathi Kolam, Kuthira, Bhairavi, Sundara Yakshi, Araki Yakshi, Marutha, Pakshi, Kalamadan and Kalan Kolam.

== Kadammanitta Padayani ==
The festival of Kadammanitta Padayani is celebrated every year from the first day of Malayalam month Medam to the 10th day, called the pathamudayam. Medam the 8th is popular for Grand padayani (Vellya Padeni) when all kolams under padayani will be performed by experts, and people interested from all over the country as well as foreigners and cultural and social leaders will come to see the performances.

Padayani is being performed as an offering to Goddess Kali (Devi) and often portrays the story of Goddess winning victory over Daarikan, an evil character. This ritual festival is famous in Kadammanitta village in Pathanamthitta district.

The main aspect of the festival of Kadammanitta Padayani is the aspect of devotion to God and is a mark of homage paid to Goddess Bhagavathy, who is symbolized as a Mother Goddess. The festival which is marked by worship of the all powerful Mother Goddess is an exhibition of passionate devotion to the Goddess who is worshipped as a Mother figure throughout the province of Kerala. A festival which is celebrated for ten days throughout this tropical paradise is a massive display of color and the elegance which stems naturally from a culture dating back to several years in antiquity. The festival is also marked by the performance of the Patayani, a popular dance form which is an intrinsic part of the celebrations of Kadammanitta Padayani. Traditionally performed on the eight day of the festival, the Patayani indicates an offering to Goddess Kali, in whose honor, the festival is celebrated. The festival is also auspicious as it marks the victory of Kali over Daariken, an evil character and the renewal of protection of the Goddess on human beings.

At Kadammanitta Devi Kshethram- First two days are the ceremonial rituals (9.pm-30mts) to start the Padayani. The presence of Goddess is evoked to the Padayani performing ground by folk songs and drumming Thappu. From third day onwards Padayani Kolam like Ganapathi, Marutha, Pakshi, Kalan, Sundara Yekshi, Bhairavi, Kanjiramala etc. are staged. (11 pm-4am). On the sixth day (19 Apr) night is Adavi, a ritual where a Palmyra tree is brought and mounts it on the ground, after some rituals the tree is then pushed down. On 21 April is Valiya padayani, the most important day of the festival. During the full night performance (12 nt to 6am), about 15 variety Kolams are staged including Maya yakshi, Anthara yakshi, Arakki yakshi, Kurathi kolam, Shiva kolam, Kanjhiramala and Mangala Bhairavi. There is no performance on ninth day. The concluding day performance is in the morning (11am-12.20pm). Apart from Folk songs, a type of folk dance called Pulavrutham and Thavadi is also performed. A grand procession is the conducted (4.30pm- 6.30pm) through the streets of the village with Jeevatha, accompanied by Velakali, kavadi, Melam, Panchavadyam etc. A similar procession (Vilakku ezhunnallippu) is conducted in the temple compound during night (11.30pm to 2 hrs) with Thalappoli etc.

== Kurampala Padayani ==
"Kurampala Padayani" is being performed once in five years. Adavi (human Sacrifice Festival) is a main ritual of Kurampala.

== Kallooppara Padayani ==
"Kallooppara Padayani" is being performed at Kallooppara Devi Temple in Kallooppara village, 8 kilometers from Thiruvalla, located between Thiruvala and Mallappally. It is held in the month of February–March (Kumbha maasam) as part of the Kumbhabharani festival. Here, Padayani is celebrated in Revathy and Aswathy of Kumbha Masam. Several artists perform this art as a worship to the Goddess, Bhadrakali. The main Kolams performed are Yakshi, Pakshi, Marutha, Bhairavi and Kalan Kolam. Along with these, Vinodam also being performed.

== Kadalimangalam Padayani ==
Padayani is conducted in the Kadalimangalam Devi Temple, in Kuttoor village in Thiruvalla every year during the months of March and April. The ten-day-long festival is conducted by the people of two local karas, namely Eruvellipara and Venpala. The rare and great Padayani Kolam, namely 'KALAYAKSHI', is performed here. It is the right of two families, namely Mukkanjirathu and Pullenplavil of the two karas, to perform this 'KALAYAKSHI KOLAM'.

== Kunnamthanam Padayani ==
"Kunnamthanam padayani" being performed at Kunnamthanam, a village in Thiruvalla along with Pathamudaya Maholsavam at Madathilkavu Bhagavathi Temple. It is being said that the padayani season in a year starts with Vrishchikam (November–December) at thelliyoorkavu and ends in month of Medam (March–April) at Kunnamthanam Madathilkavu temple. Gothrakalapeedom is an organization dedicated to providing training and promoting projects involving Padayani, a folk art form of Kerala. It is located at Kunnamthanam, a nature-rich village in Thiruvalla.It was formed in 2004 aiming to bring back Padayani, a long lost ritual of the village temple "Madathilkavu Devi Kshetram". The ‘arangetram’ of the first batch trained by Tharanamuriyil Vasudevan Pillai asan was in the year 2005 Gothrakalapeedom was successful in its efforts and became well established, extending the activities to make Padayani renowned across the world, to assist research works on the history of Padayani and to implement welfare programmes for Padayani artistes. Active participation of the local people in its efforts contribute to the success of the organization. It also focuses on the promotion of age-old temple rituals of Kerala like the Kalamezhuth and Mudiyettu. These ritual art forms, unlike many other art forms of Kerala receive the whole-hearted involvement of the local people, which makes them stand apart. The artists of Gothrakalapeedom have performed at various temples and platforms for cultural collaborations across Kerala. The Kunnamthanam Padayani is one among the earliest Padayanis of Central Travancore. The ritual is observed in association with the Madathilkavu Bhagavathy Temple. The Padayani was presented for 8 days from Medam 3 to Medam10. The real architects of the Kunnamthanam Padayani, the Sage like Kanppettil Narayanakurup Asan, Allimangalathu Krishna Pilla Asan, Kamukumcheril Kunjunni Kurup Asan, were its real torch bearers. The Padayani discontinued from 1952 was ritualised again in 2005. The Kunnamthanam Padayani owes its birth to the Gothrakalapeedom, a renowned training group for rituals and folklore. Tharanamuryil T.K. Vasudevan Pilla Asan was instrumental in recreating the Kunnamthanam Padayani by keeping intact its old rites.

Five Ganapathykolams in the guise of Pisachu dancing in the Kalam (ground), the imagery of the sky bound Ambarayakshy descending in a chariot as Chattathelyakshy, and the Devathakolam, resembling the Madthilkkavil Bhagavathy are exclusive features of the Kunnamthanam Padayani .

The Padayani is observed annually on Medam 7 (20 April). Madathilkkavu Bhagavathy Temple, situated, is accessible from Thiruvalla (12 km) and Changanacherry (11 km).

=== Myth ===
A very destructive war between the devas (gods) and the asuras (powerful beings often depicted in opposition to the devas) left only two women, Danavathi and Darumathi, with the asura class. Left to themselves they practiced tapasya (devotion penance) to please Brahma the creator. By his blessings each begot a son, Danava and Darika. When Darika came of age Darumathi narrated to him the sad tale of the defeat and destruction of their class by the devas. She exhorted him to do penance to please Brahma and obtain powers with which he should retrieve the lost glory of their class. Darika performed arduous tapasya, which Brahma could not ignore, and he blessed him with such powers as may shield him from harm by man or god night and day. Brahma bestowed him with the mighty rod of Brahma, a weapon of great destructive potential. But an arrogant turn by the asura enraged Brahma who added to his devotee’s luck death by a divine damsel. Darika with the help of the supernal architect Maya built a splendid palace on the shores of the western sea and proclaimed protection and honor to all the surviving members of his class scattered and hiding. With their help he reconstituted the asura army, fought with Indra the chief of gods, and defeated him. Darika didn't stop with this. He took intermittent military excursions into the territories of the devas and became a perpetual menace to them. The gods in distress petitioned to Vishnu the great god of preservation who directed them to Shiva who told them that only a goddess of extraordinary prowess could slay Darika.Thus Brahma created Brahmi, Vishnu created Vaishnavi and Shiva Maheswari, Indra Indrani, Subrahmanya Kumari, and Yama Varahi. Their combined effort could not, however, vanquish Darika. Then fate in the form of Narada, the celestial monk, came in Darika’s way.

The haughty asura reproached the saint and threatened to kill him. The distressed Narada went to Kailasa and complained to Shiva about the demonic behaviour. The infuriated Shiva created Bhadrakali out of his third eye and assigned to her the task of destroying the asura. In the battle that followed Bhadrakali killed Darika’s minister. Provoked, Darika decided to confront Kali, but before going to the battlefield he transferred all the powerful mantras (hymns of invocation) to his wife. Darika used the rod of brahma forcing Kali to retreat. Goddess Kartyayani, an ally of Kali, who knew that Darika was no more the sole owner of the mantras of his success, tricked the asura’s wife disguising herself as an innocent Brahmin girl. With all the powerful mantras of the opponent now with her, Kali fought with Darika and on the twenty-second day she captured the rod of Brahma, cut her opponent's head and slaked her thirst with his blood. Kali’s fury raged even after the war ended. Her army of goddesses and phantoms, terrified at the unusual anger of their leader, fled the field and sought refuge in Shiva.Shiva proposed several modes of entertainment to cool her down. Dance, music, comic dialogues and mime were tried but all in vain. But when Lord Subrahmanya drew her furious form on the ground, and then acted her out with gorgeous accoutrement and rhythmic movement, Kali was amused and pleased. This, in brief, is the story behind Padayani.

Mythical narratives of this sort that form background to art forms like Padayani are also ground for the founding of certain ethics. During succeeding stages of social change meanings were attached ‘figures’ – acted out with the help of accoutrement and designs drawn on the floor. The ‘figures’(Kolam in Malayalam) became signifiers with signifieds lying in the religious system that was developing alongside the social system. Padayani, as it is known today, has, apart from its artistic function, the function of relieving the social group of ‘spirits’ that malign body and soul. Each Kolam has a purpose and a meaning, its function is not individual but social.

== See also ==
- Theyyam
