= Pandalam Bypass =

Proposed road project in Pandalam

Pandalam Bypass is a proposed road project by Kerala Infrastructure Investment Fund Board undertaking by Government of Kerala. The project set to be in Pandalam, Pathanamthitta, Kerala.
