= Kottangal =

- Census village
- Location in Kerala, India Kottangal (India)
- Coordinates: 9°27′0″N 76°44′0″E
- Country: India
- State: Kerala
- District: Pathanamthitta

Area
  - Total: 23.08 km^{2} (8.91 sq mi)

Population (2011)
  - Total: 17,174
  - Density: 744.1/km^{2} (1,927/sq mi)
- Time zone: UTC+5:30 (IST)
- Postal code: 686547
- Vehicle registration: KL-28 (Mallappally)
- Literacy: 97.18%

Kottangal is a census village in Kottangal gram panchayat in the Mallapally taluk, Thiruvalla Revenue Division in the district of Pathanamthitta in Kerala.It is part of Thiruvalla Constituency.As of 2011, it had a population of 17,174.

The Kottangal Devi Temple is famous for its Padayani performances- an art form dedicated to the Hindu goddess Bhadrakali, unique to the Central Travancore region.

== Demographics ==
As per the 2011 Indian census, Kottangal has a population of 17,174. It has a sex ratio of 1092 females per 1000 males. Children below 6 years of age constitute 9.38% of the total population. Scheduled Castes and Scheduled Tribes constitute 7.83% and 0.24% of the population respectively. The total literacy rate was 97.18% (97.52% for males and 96.87% for females), which is higher than the state average of 94% and the national average of 74.04%.

== Culture ==
=== Kottangal Padayani ===
Kottangal Padayani is performed along with the 8 (Ettu padayani) days from a total of 28 days during January - February (Makara Bharani). This is performed every year at Kottangal Devi Temple located in the boundary of Kottayam and Pathanamthitta Districts. The last 8 days are important with the performance of different Kolams and other traditional programs.

The padayani is done by two karas (areas which contains different sub areas) Kottangal and Kulathoor. The last 8 days are equally divided into two karas that is 4 for each. The last two days (valiya Padayani) are most important for both Karas and they conduct programs in a competitive manner. Beautiful processions will be there on the evening of last two days. The main programs include vela Kali, Adavi, Pallippana, Vellam Kudi, vinodam and kolam Thullal. The kolams performed in the padayani are Ganapathi Kolam, Kuthira, Bhairavi, Sundara Yakshi, Araki Yakshi, Marutha, Pakshi, Kalamadan and Kalan Kolam.

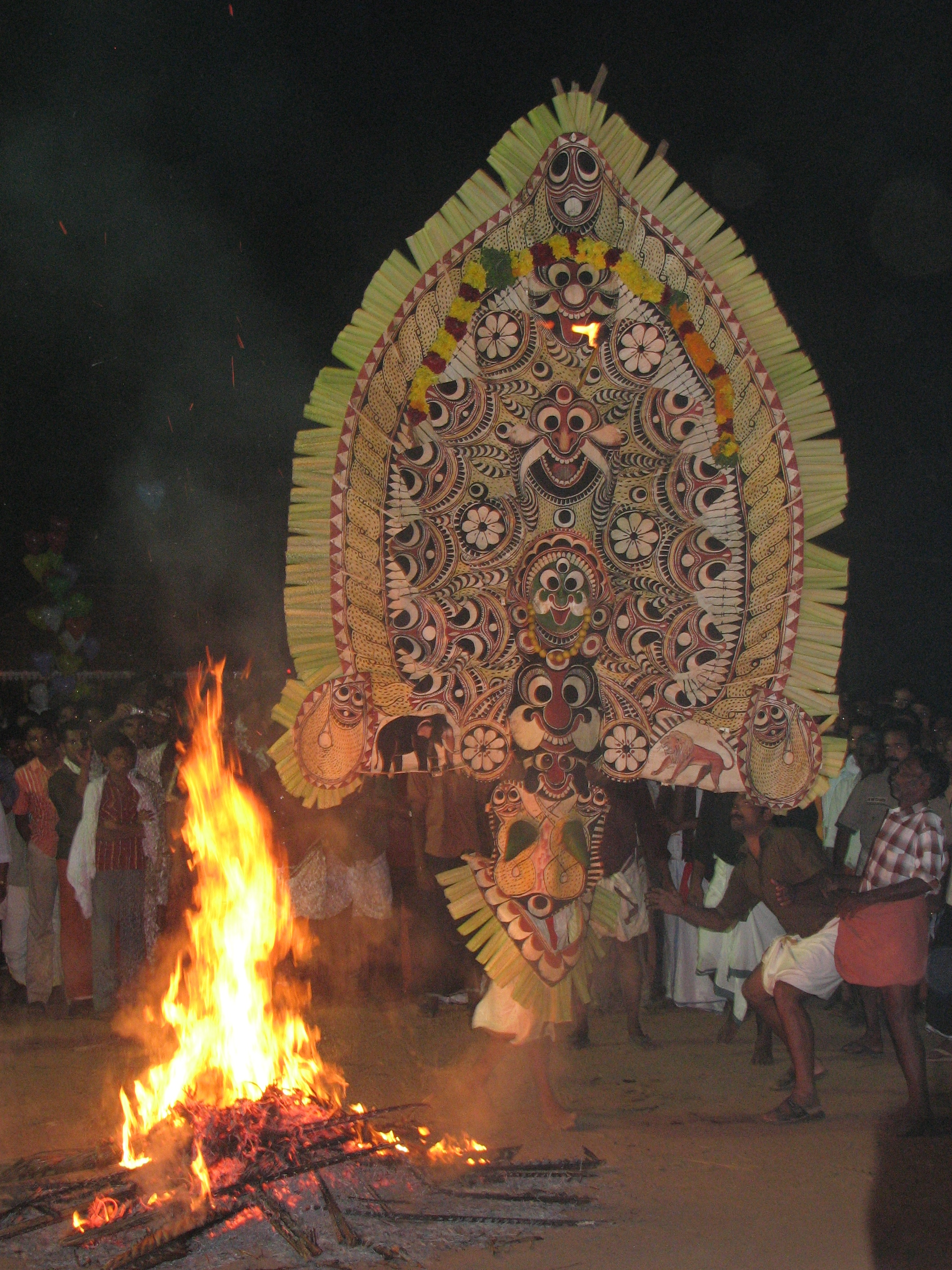
