= Pandalapaka, East Godavari district =

Pandalapaka
- village
- Interactive map of Pandalapaka
- Location in Andhra Pradesh, India Pandalapaka (India)
- Coordinates: 16.92°N 82.01°E
- Country: India
- State: Andhra Pradesh
- District: East Godavari

Population (2001)
  - Total: 7,789

Languages
  - Official: Telugu
- Time zone: UTC+5:30 (IST)
- PIN: 533345
- Vehicle registration: AP

Pandalapaka is a village in Biccavolu in East Godavari District of Andhra Pradesh, India.
