= Anandavalleeshwaram Sri Mahadevar Temple =

Anandavalleeswaram Sri Mahadevar Temple
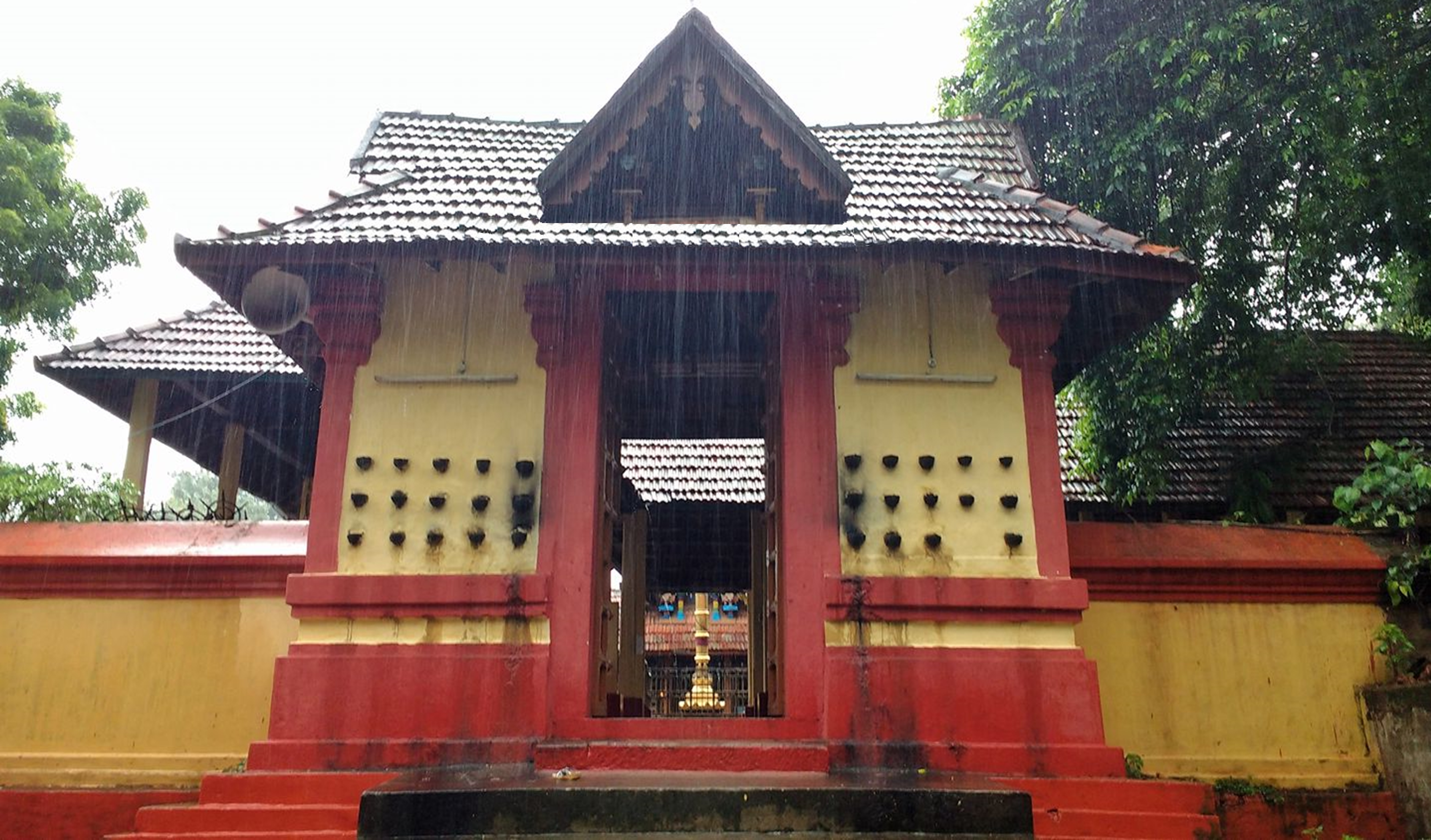
- West Temple Tower

- Mahadevar Temple, Anandavalleeshwaram, Kollam, Kerala

Religion
- Affiliation: Hinduism
- District: Kollam
- Deity: Shiva
- Festival: Maha Shivaratri

Location
- Location: Anandavalleeshwaram, Kollam city
- State: Kerala
- Country: India
- Coordinates: 8°53′36.2″N 76°34′22.1″E

Architecture
- Type: Kerala Dravidian Style
- Completed: 11th century

Specifications
- Temple: 1
- Elevation: 32.8 m (108 ft)

Anandavalleeswaram Sri Mahadevar Temple (Malayalam: ആനന്ദവല്ലീശ്വരം ശ്രീ മഹാദേവർ ക്ഷേത്രം) in Kollam city is one of the ancient Hindu temples in Kerala, India. Lord Siva and Goddess Anandavally are the main deities of the temple. According to folklore, sage Parashurama has installed the idol of Lord Shiva. The temple is a part of the 108 famous Shiva temples in Kerala. It is located at Anandavalleeswaram, a major neighborhood of Kollam city, that comes to the west side of Kollam Collectorate.

== Importance ==
The main Sanctum Sanctorum of Anandavalleeswaram Sri Mahadevar temple is 1200 years old and it constructed in Teak wood. This is the only Hindu temple in India which has the deities of Sree Krishnan, Maha Vishnu, Bhoomi Devi and Lakshmi Devi consecrated as idols under a single structure (Sanctum sanctorum). The temple is located in the city of Kollam. It is believed that Kollam Anandavalleeswaram Temple is one of the 108 Shiva temples of Kerala and is installed by sage Parasurama dedicated to Shiva. It is one of the three Mahadeva temples of Kollam city is mentioned in 108 Shivalaya Sothram. The second temple in the 108 Shivalaya Sothram is Kollam Rameswaram Mahadeva Temple and the third temple is Thrikkadavoor Mahadeva Temple.

== Deities and Sub-deities ==
The presiding deity of the temple is Shiva is facing west in the main Sanctum Sanctorum and his consort Devi Parvathy is also in the same sanctum sanctorum (Sreekovil) is facing east. Lord Shiva of this temple is called as Ananda Swaroopan and Devi Parvathy is called as Swayamvara Parvathy (Anandavally). It believe that both the deities are said to be in a happy state and hence the temple name Anandavalleeswaram (Anandam in Malayalam means 'Joy'). Initially the temple had only Shiva as the deity and Devi Parvati was consecrated later in the form of Anandavally. Even though Devi Parvati's garbagriha is the immediate one to the entrance, one is supposed to enter the temple only through the door which lead to the sanctum sanctorum of Lord Shiva.

=== Sub Deities ===
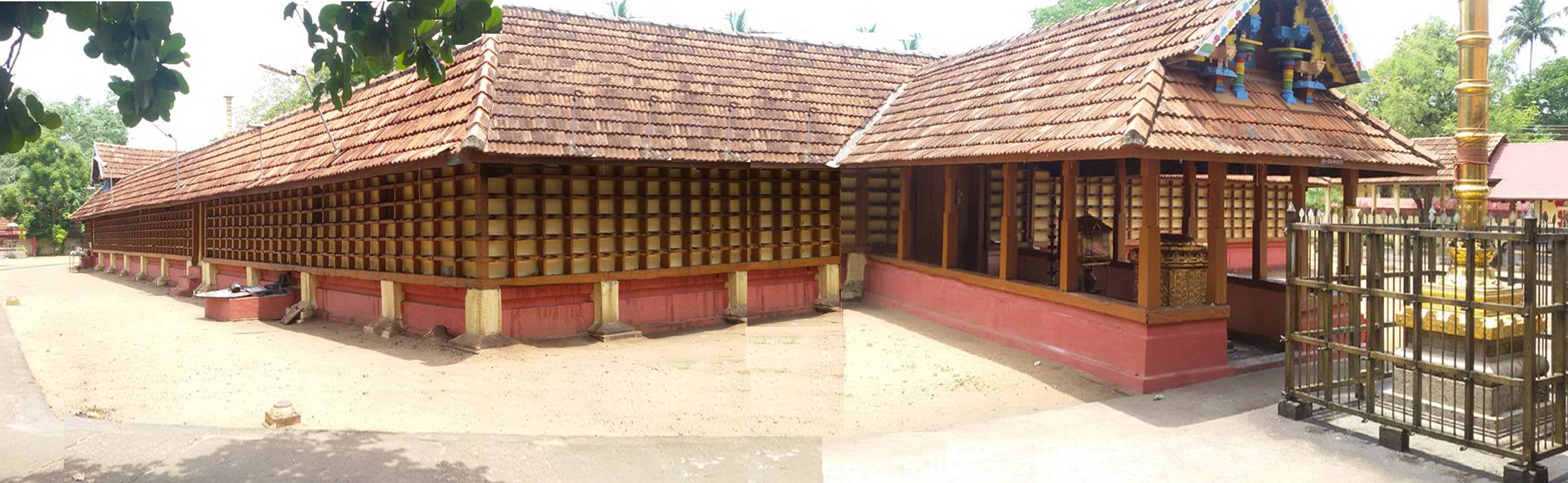
Temple Nalambalm facing west

- Ganapathy
- Murugan
- Sree Krishnan
- Hanuman Swamy
- Swamy Ayyappan
- Maha Vishnu
- Lakshmi Devi
- Bhoomi Devi
- Naga Devathas

Among these, all except Ganapathy are installed outside the nalambalam. Ganapathy is installed inside the nalambalam at the south-western side, facing east. The shrine dedicated to Maha Vishnu with his two consorts and Sree Krishnan is very peculiar, since it is the only temple in the whole world with such a system. It is also the only temple in Kerala where both Shiva and Vishnu are installed with their consorts.

== Temple festival ==
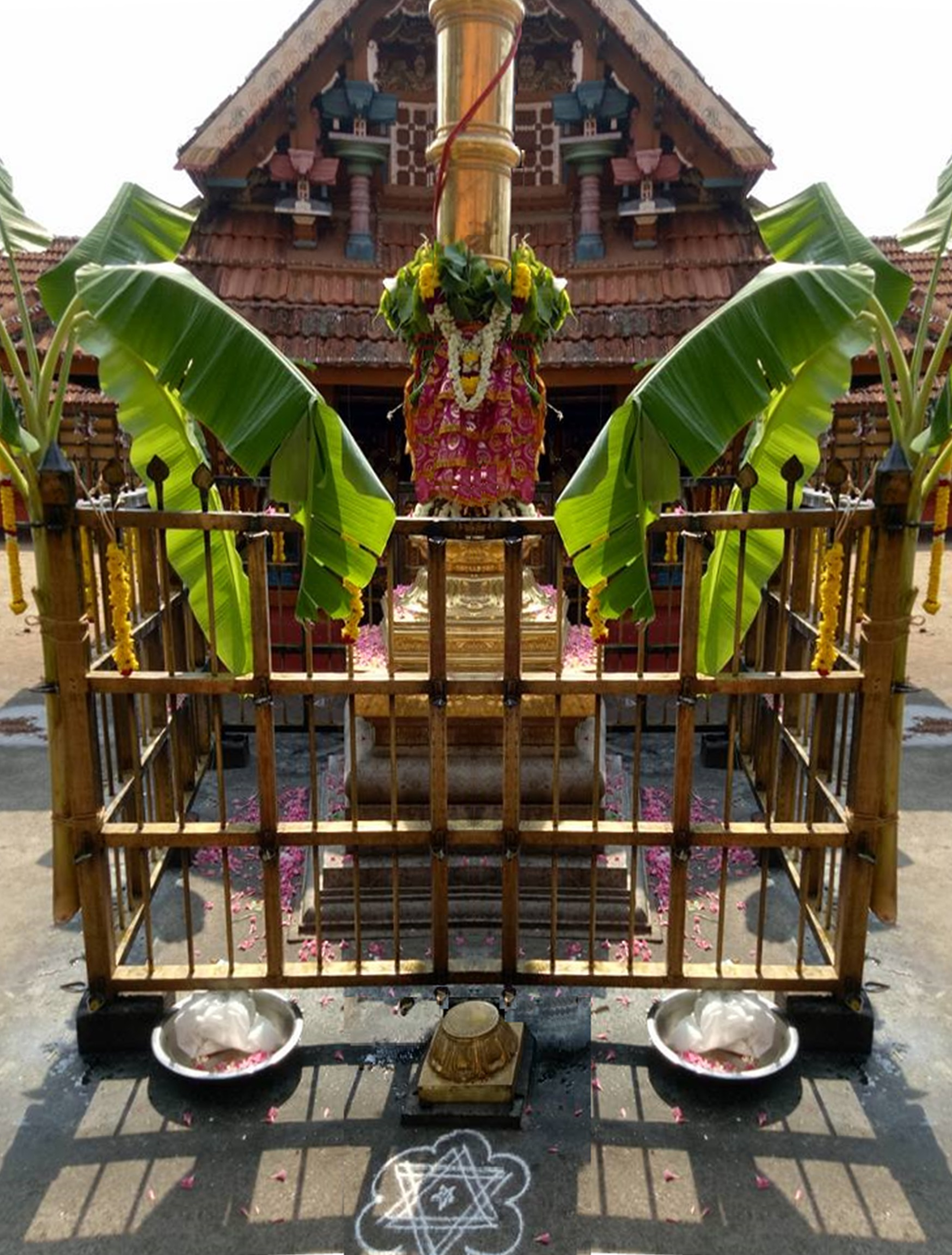
Hoisted Flag on Golden Flag Mast in Annual Festival

The annual festival of Anandavalleeswaram Mahadevar Temple is celebrates for ten-days in the month of March–April (Malayalam month: Meenam). This ten days festival will begin with the traditional 'Thrikodiyettu'. There would be other rituals including Pallivetta ritual, Arattu, Aratu Ethirelpu, Ezhunallathu, Kazhcha Sribali, Kettukazhcha ritual and other cultural programmes comprising dance, dramas, music programmes and also pyrotechnic display as part of the annual festival. Sivarathri festival is the other important one celebrated by the temple every year. Tantric rites of the temple belong to Thazhamon Madom, Chengannoor.

== Offerings ==
Abhishekam, Ganapathy Homam, Mrithyunjaya Homam, Ashtotharchana, Muzhukappu, Pushpamjali and so on.

== Controversy ==
- An antique idol of Lord Krishna, which was installed in the temple as a sub-deity, got stolen on 2 August 2015. On 3 August, the temple pond was emptied in the presence of the Kollam City Police as part of the investigations to find the panchaloha idol. Later on 11 August 2015, a Police team under the Kollam City Police led by City Police Commissioner P. Prakash IPS has recovered the stolen idol from a house at Pothencode in Thiruvananthapuram. This is an old idol of gosalakrishna in 9th century old under the custodian of kollam raja in his palace named as puthukulangara palace (old name of anandavalleswarm was puthukulangara) .

== See also ==
- 108 Shiva Temples
- Temples of Kerala
- Kollam Rameswaram Mahadeva Temple
- Amaravila Rameswaram Sri Mahadeva Temple

== Location ==
Anandavalleeswaram temple is situated in the heart of Kollam (Quilon) Municipal Corporation; 2.5 km from Kollam Junction railway station. Many pilgrimage and tourist places are near to the temple (Ashtamudi Lake, Thirumullavaram Beach, Kollam Rameswaram Mahadeva Temple etc.

== Temple Photos ==
Anandavalleeshwaram Sri Mahadevar Temple

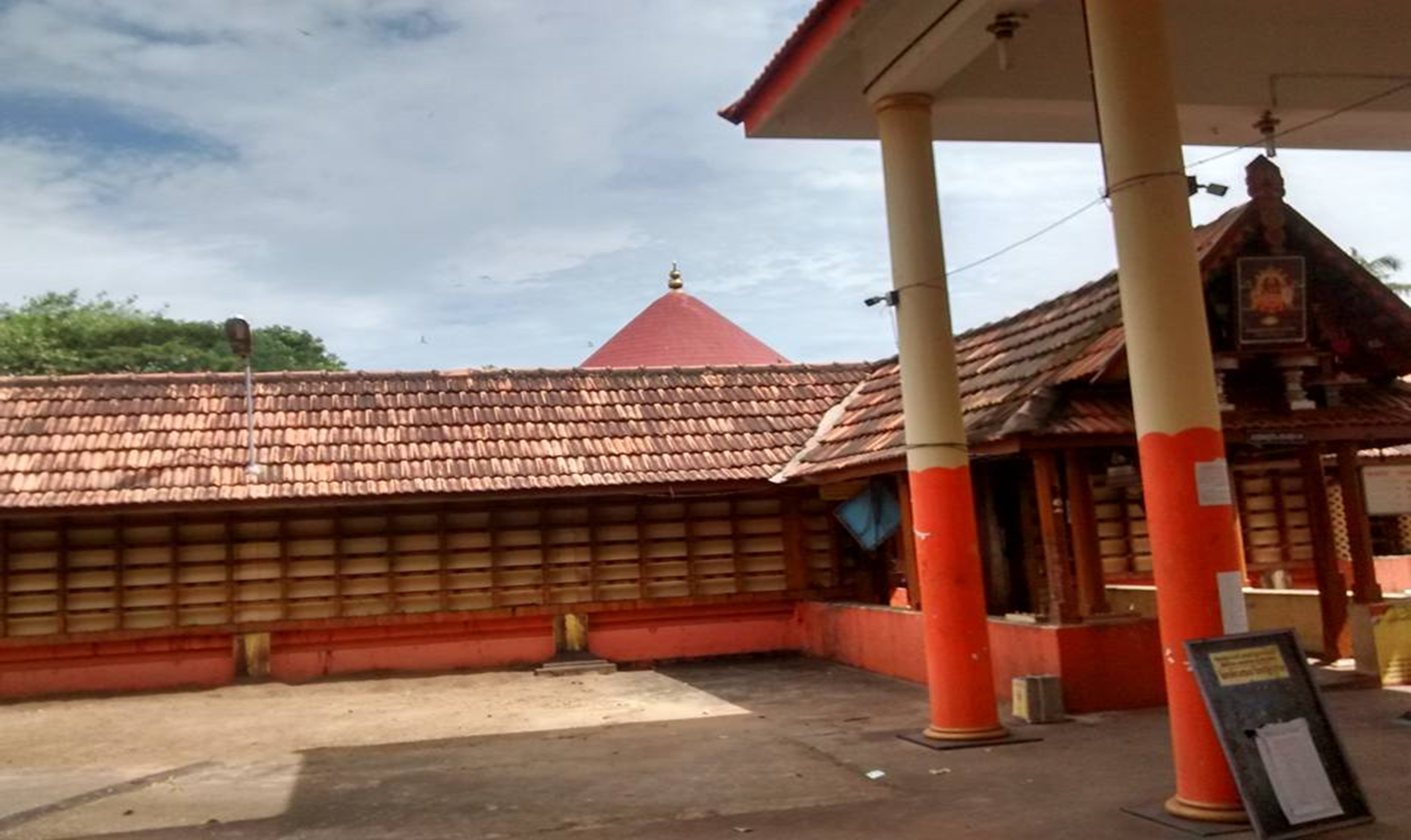
East Nalambalam
(Goddess Anandavalli)

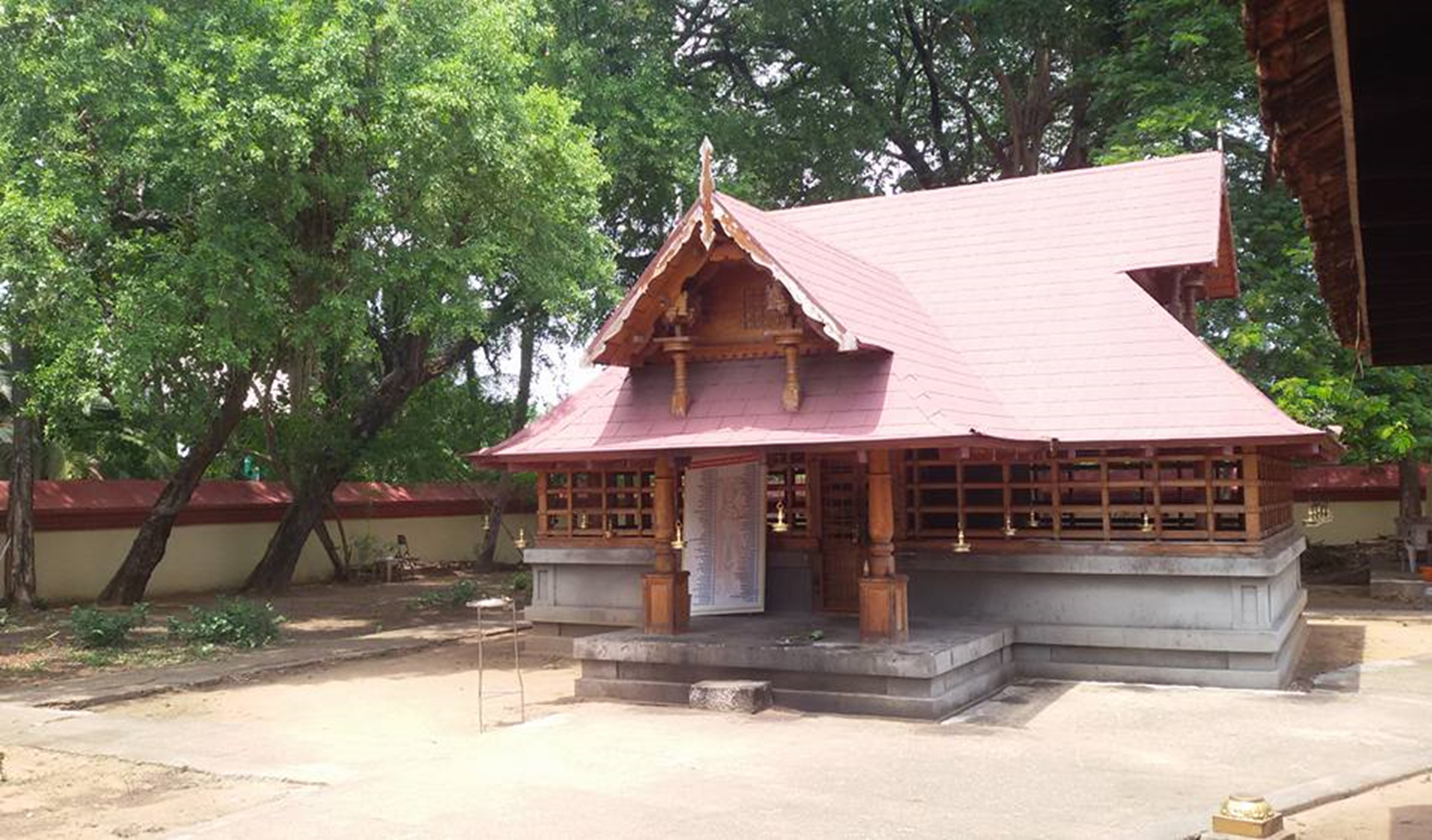
Sub Deity Shrine

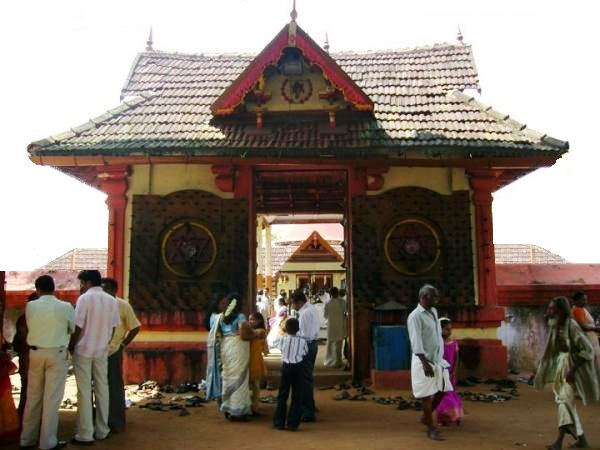
East Tower

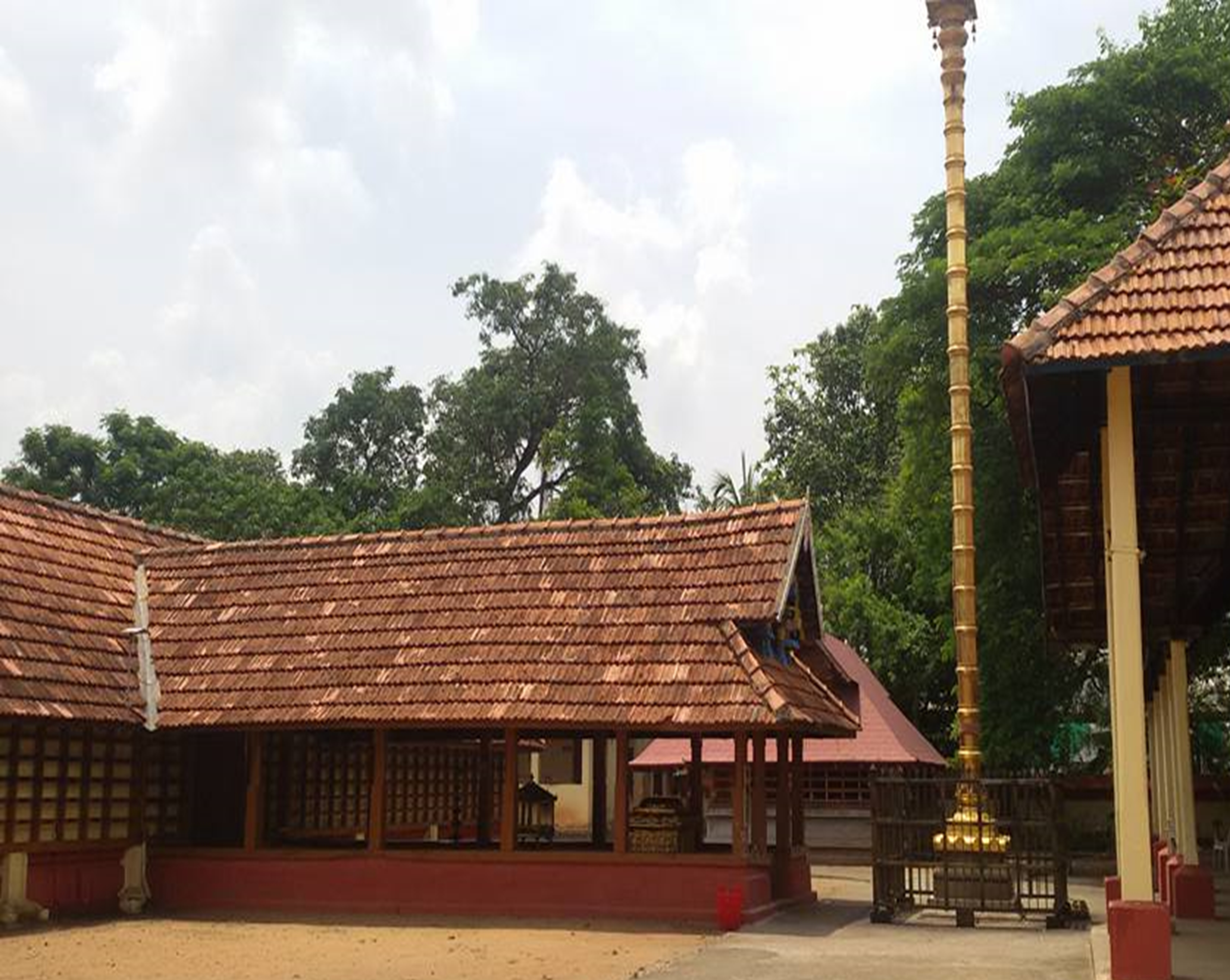
West Nalamabalm
(Lord Shiva)

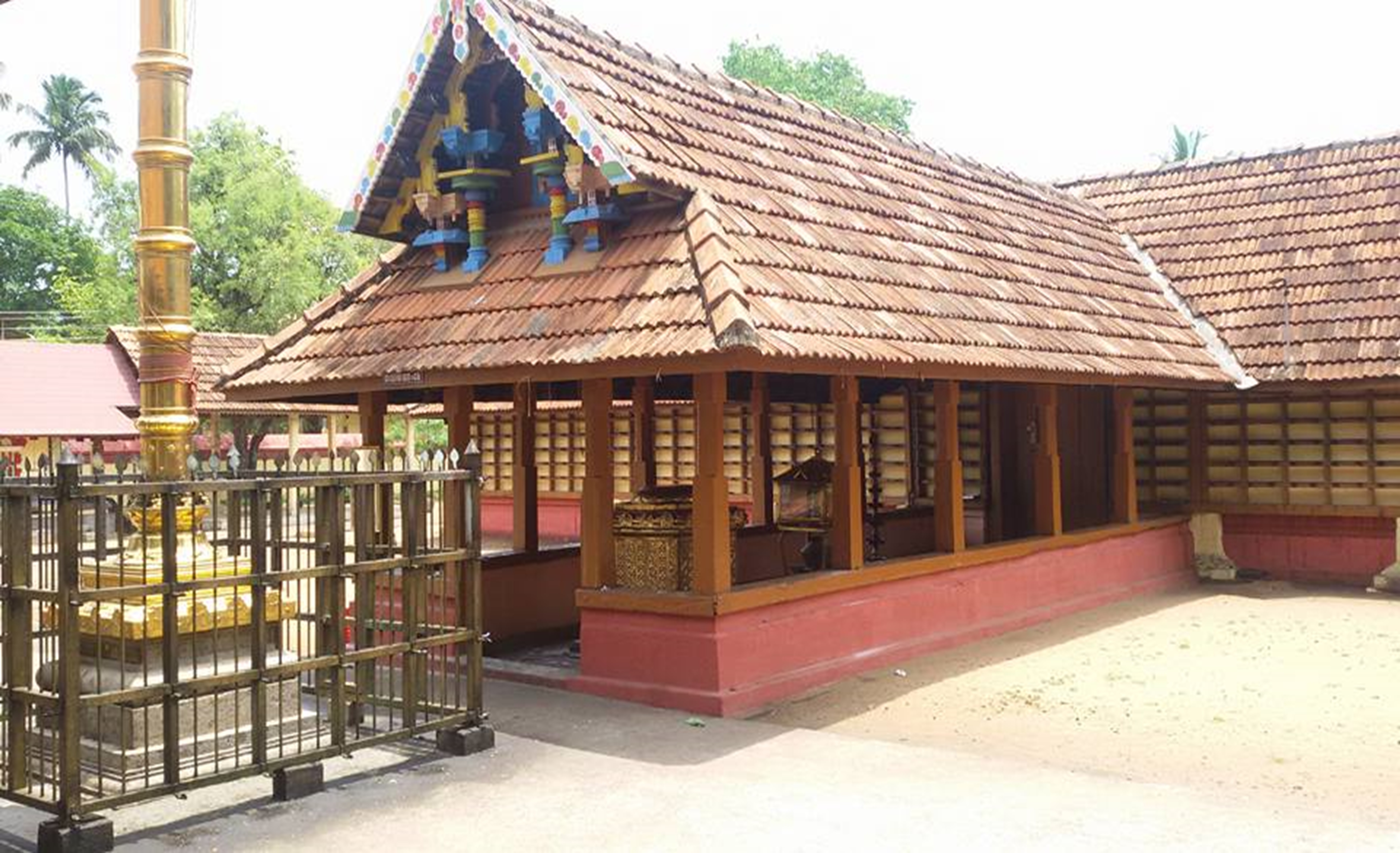
Golden Flag Mast
