= Pandalapaka, Visakhapatnam district =

Pandalapaka
- Village
- Interactive map of Pandalapaka
- Location in Andhra Pradesh, India Pandalapaka (India)
- Coordinates: 17.9076°N 83.3416°E
- Country: India
- State: Andhra Pradesh
- District: Visakhapatnam
- Mandal: Anandapuram mandal
- Elevation: 52 m (171 ft)

Population (2011)
  - Total: 1,115

Languages
  - Official: Telugu
- Time zone: UTC+05:30 (IST)
- Postal code: 530 052

Pandalapaka is a village in Visakhapatnam district of the Indian state of Andhra Pradesh. It is under of Visakhapatnam revenue division.

== Demographics ==
As of 2011 Census of India, Pandalapaka has population of 1,115 of which 581 are males while 534 are females. Average Sex Ratio of Pandalapaka village is 919. Population of children with age 0-6 is 269 which makes up 13.65% of total population of village with child sex ratio 865. Literacy rate of Pandalapaka village is 50.36%.
