= Pandalam KSRTC Bus Station =

Transport hub in Pandalam, India

Pandalam KSRTC Bus Station പന്തളം കെ.എസ്സ്.ആര്‍.ടി.സി ബസ്സ്‌ സ്റ്റേഷന്‍
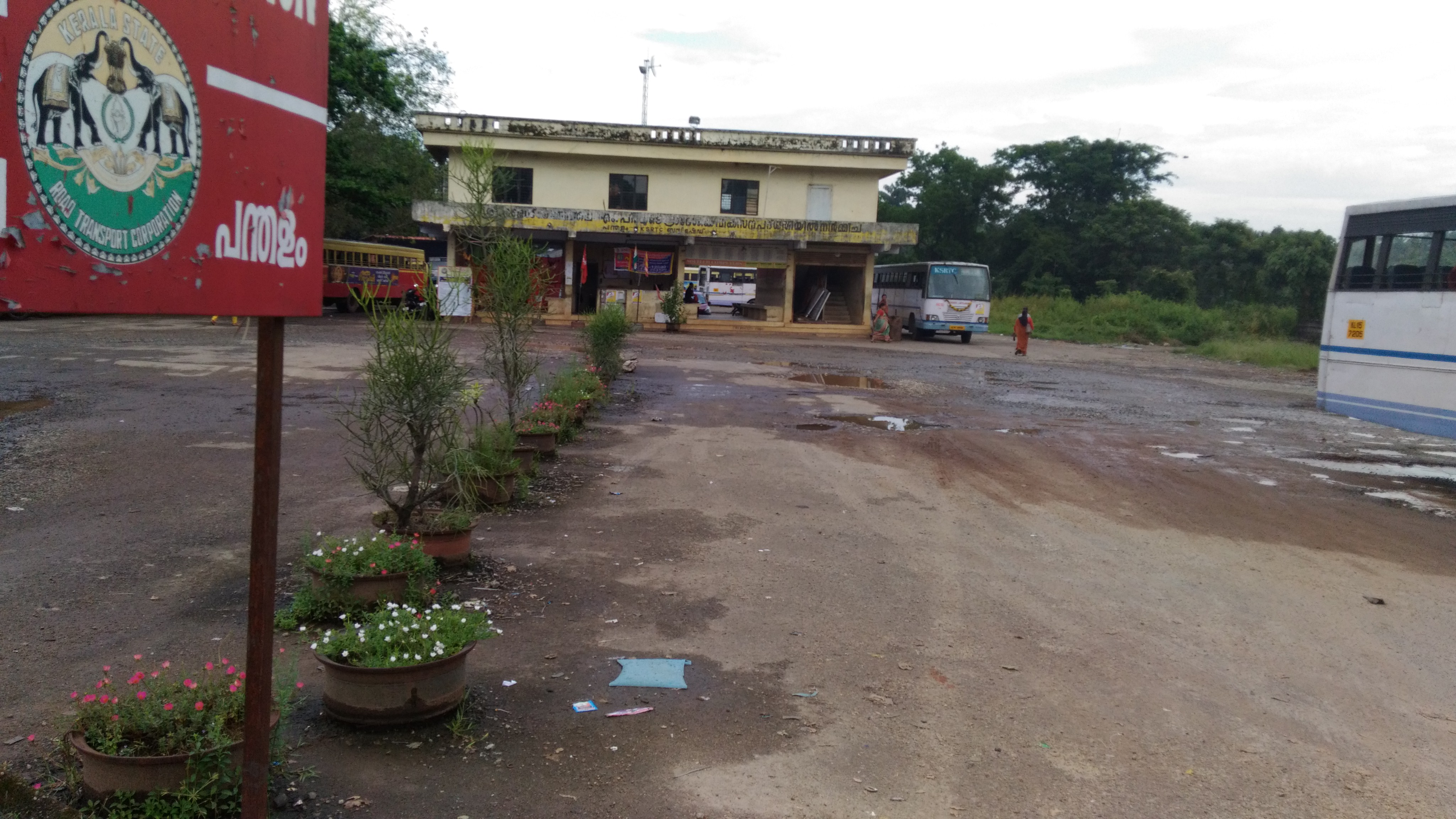
- Pandalam KSRTC Bus Station

General information
- Location: Pandalam, Pathanamthitta, Kerala; India
- Coordinates: 9.2251°N 76.6785°E
- Owner: Kerala State Road Transport Corporation (KSRTC)
- Operator: Kerala State Road Transport Corporation

Construction
- Structure type: At Grade
- Parking: Yes

Services
Intrastate, Interstate, JnNURM
Location

Pandalam KSRTC Bus Station is an important transport hub in the Indian city of Pandalam, owned and operated by the Kerala State Road Transport Corporation (KSRTC) under the depot code PDM. Long distance intrastate, inter-state and city buses run regularly from the bus station.
