= Kolam Thullal =

Type of dance in Kerala, India

Kolam Thullal is a ritual dance form prevalent in south Kerala, southern India. It is customary in houses and temples of Bhagavathy, a female deity. It is performed at temple festivals and to drive away evil spirits from the "possessed" bodies. Its origins lie with the Tinta group of the Kaniyar caste. The ritual is similar to the Tovil and Kolam rituals of the Sinhalese people in Sri Lanka

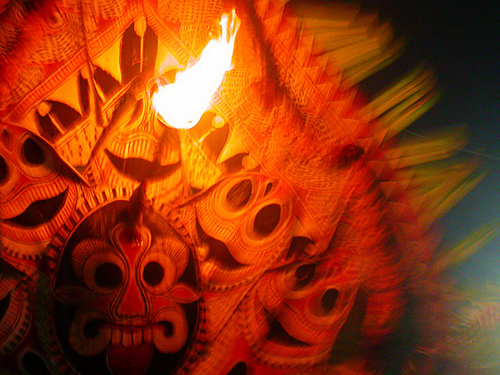
A close-up of a Kolam procession - At Thazhoor Bhagavathy Temple, Vazhamuttom

== See also ==
- Kerala Folklore Akademi
- Kathakali
