= Mahatma Gandhi Road (Thiruvananthapuram) =

Road in Kerala, India

M G Road
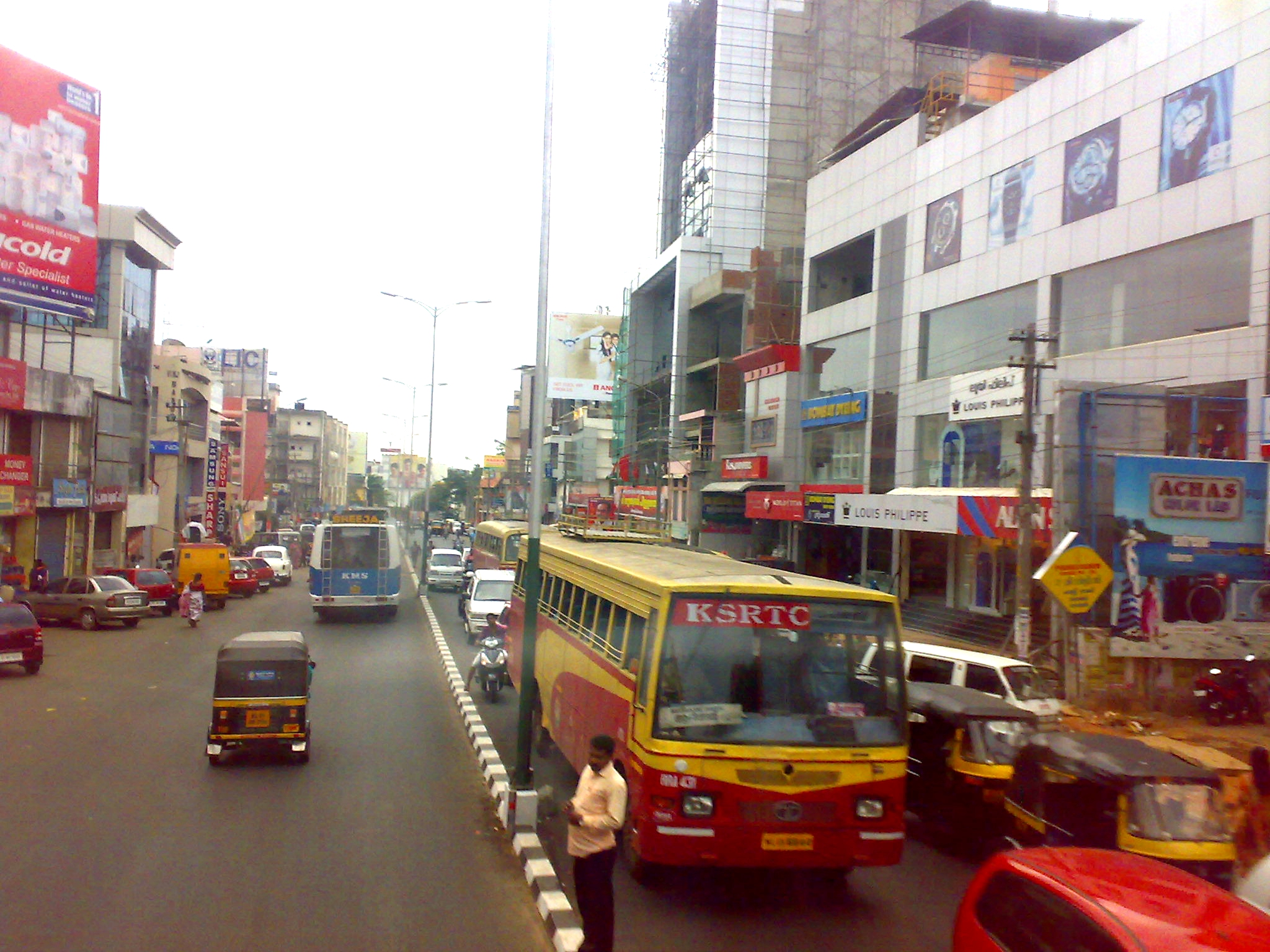

Route information
- Length: 6 km (3.7 mi)
- Existed: 1920–present

Location
- Country: India
- State: Kerala

Highway system
- Roads in India; Expressways; National; State; Asian; State Highways in Kerala

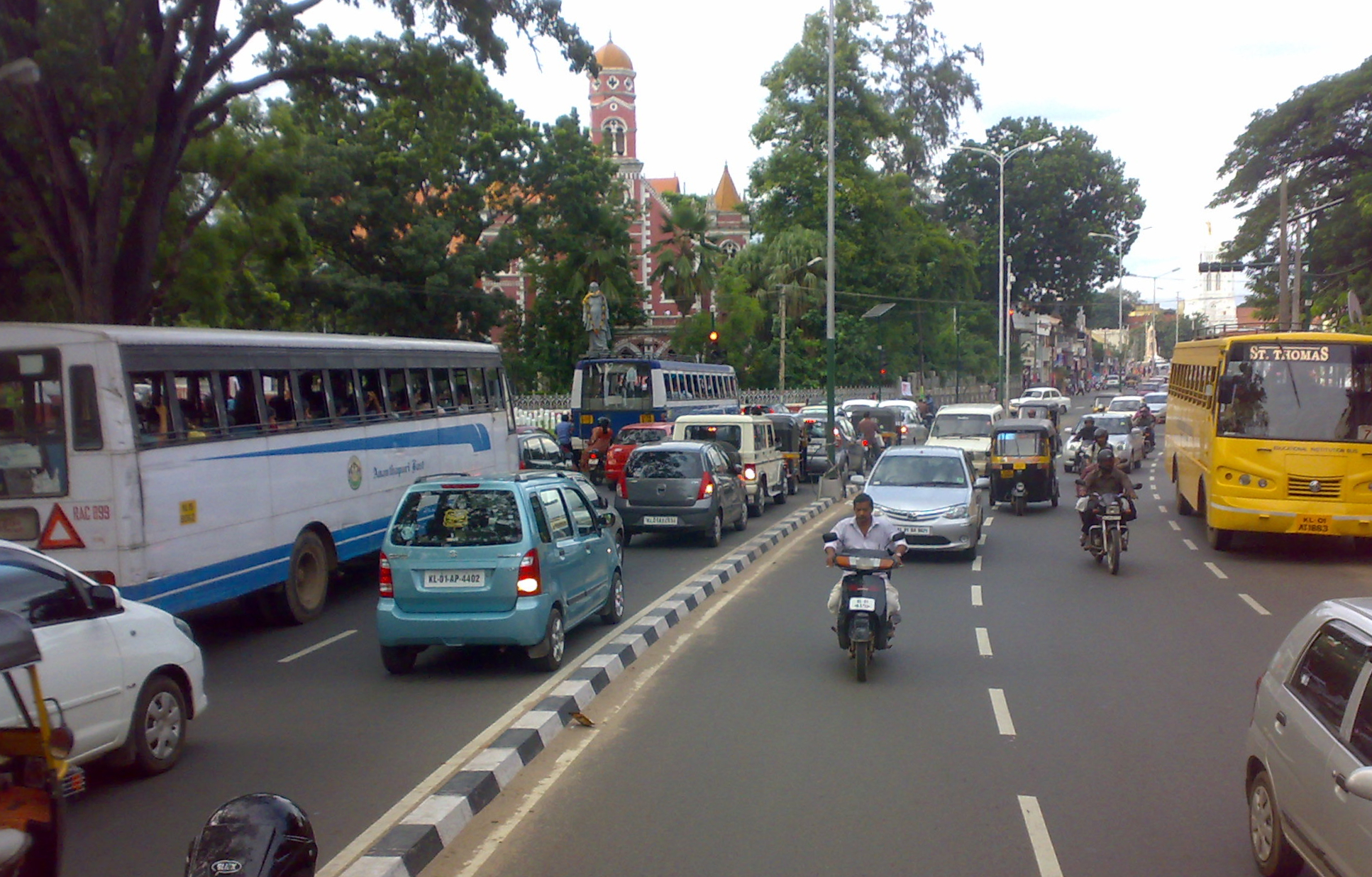
MG Road view

Mahatma Gandhi Road is the most important north–south road in Thiruvananthapuram City situated in the state of Kerala, India. The road starts from one of the most busiest centre in the state at East Fort and ends near to the LMS Church in the Museum Road. It is one of the main business streets in the city and the state and always carries heavy traffic. The road is of 6km in length and is maintained by the Thiruvananthapuram Corporation.

== Alignment ==
Its southern beginning point is at East fort in front of the famous Sree Padmanabhaswamy Temple and ends at LMS Junction, near Palayam in the north. From East Fort the road continues towards southwards to Thiruvallam Junction joining the National Highway 66.

== Landmarks ==
Many colonial era forts can be seen in and around East Fort like Vettimurichakotta, Kizhakkekotta etc. Its southern extreme constitute the main wholesale business district of Trivandrum, namely the Chalai Bazaar to the east of the road. It is also the most important trading centre in the city and the state from pre-independence period. To the west is the famous Sri Padmanabha Swamy Temple, inside the fort, the nucleus around which Trivandrum city evolved in the 18th-19th century. The major city bus stand known as the East Fort Bus Stand is also located here. There is also major parks like the Mahatma Gandhi Park, Putharikandam Maidanam are also located in East Fort. The second entry of Thiruvananthapuram Central Railway Station also opens, through the Power House Road, to MG Road at Pazhavangady, which is also famous for its Ganesha temple.

Other Important landmarks of the city like the Government Ayurveda College, Kerala Government Secretariat, housing various government offices, University College, Connemara Market, Martyrs Column, Chandrasekharan Nair Stadium, Kerala University Stadium, Fine Arts College, Central Library, second gate to Thiruvananthapuram Corporation are located along this road.

== Development works ==
North of Overbridge Junction, the road is in various stages of being widened to six lanes, a part of the Capital Road Improvement Project. The project was expected to complete in a year.

Being the capital, the road is often blocked by various protest marches. The entire city often used to face this difficulty as MG Road was the main arterial road. To overcome this problem, an underpass from Senate Hall Circle now runs below the Martyrs' Square and ends to the east of Palayam, to the north of Connemara Market, on the main road to the Railway Station.

== Public transit ==
Many city buses servicing the city and its suburbs run through MG Road.

== Junctions ==
MG Road in Thiruvananthapuram is the largest road in the state of Kerala in terms of size and traffic. Since the MG Road is the longest and widest road in Kerala, it naturally has many junctions. In total the road passes through main 10 / 11 (Palayam is even divided into 2 more junctions) junctions.

- East Fort Junction – This is the beginning junction of the MG Road. It is situated in East Fort (main road). The road towards the left connects the West Fort while the road towards the right connects the Chalai Bazaar, Thiruvananthapuram. The road extends to the south to Thiruvallam Junction via Attakulangara, Manacaud, Kallattumukku, Ambalathara. The Thiruvananthapuram City Bus Station is located in this junction. There are shopping malls and cinema theatres nearby.
- Pazhavangadi Junction – This is the second junction of the MG Road. There is a Ganesha temple here (undertaken by the army). The road towards the left connects the Padmavilasom Road and the road on the right connects straight to the 2nd terminal of the Thiruvananthapuram Central railway station.
- Thakaraparambu Junction – A fly over runs above through this junction connecting the old NH 66 from Killipalam towards the Thiruvananthapuram International Airport. On the left it connects to the Thakaraparambu Road towards West Fort and the Airport and to the right it connects to the Power House Road towards the Railway Station.
- Overbridge Junction – This is the biggest junction in the city. On the left it connects the Chettikulangara Road and towards the right it connects Thampanoor where the Central Bus Station and the Thiruvananthapuram Central Railway Station is situated.
- Ayurveda College Junction – This is the 5th Junction of the MG Road. It is just 1/2 a km from the Over Bridge. On the left it connects the Dhanya-Remya Theatre Road and on the right it connects the Jacob's Junction. The junction is situated close to many shops like Pothys and Bhima, and pubs like Purple Lounge. One of the biggest stationery shop in Kerala is also here.
- Pulimoodu Junction – On the left, it connects the Ambujavilasom road and to the right it connects the Press road. The Thiruvananthapuram GPO and variety of shops and major offices are located here.
- Statue Junction – There is a big statue of T. Madhava Rao and so it is called Statue or Statue Junction. On the left it connects the Statue Road towards the Government General Hospital and on the right is the Kerala Government Secretariat.
- Spencer Junction – On the left is the University College and there is a small road in between the college and a Spencer Shop which leads to Palayam-Airport Road. On the right there is a road connecting directly to the Bakery Junction.
  Palayam is known as the heart of the city because it is in the center of the city. Palayam is also famous for a religious confluence where one can find all the major three religions at one point: Palayam St Joseph Church, Palayam Juma Masjid and a Palayam Ganapathi Temple. The Chandrasekharan Nair Stadium and the CONNEMARA MARKET are also here. Palayam is divided into two junctions:
  - Palayam Junction 1 – On the left it leads to the University of Kerala and to the city underpass while the road on the right leads to the City Press Road.
  - Palayam Junction 2 – On the left it leads to the Kerala Legislative Assembly Complex Road and the road on the right leads to the flyover in bakery junction.
- LMS compound/Museum Junction - This is the final junction of the Thiruvananthapuram City MG Road. On the left it leads to PMG junction and the road on the right leads to the Museum Road.

== Gallery ==
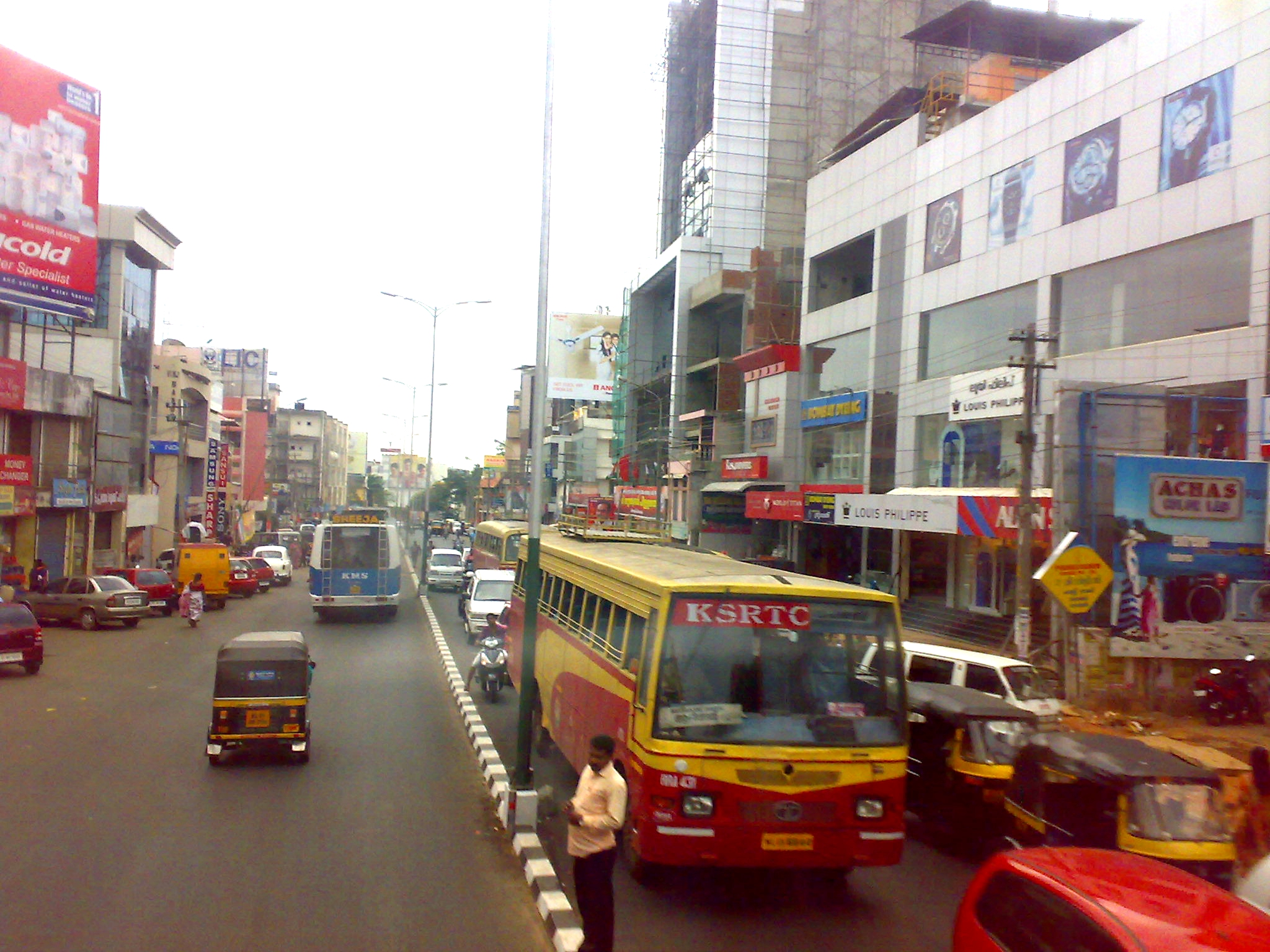
Mahathma Gandhi Road

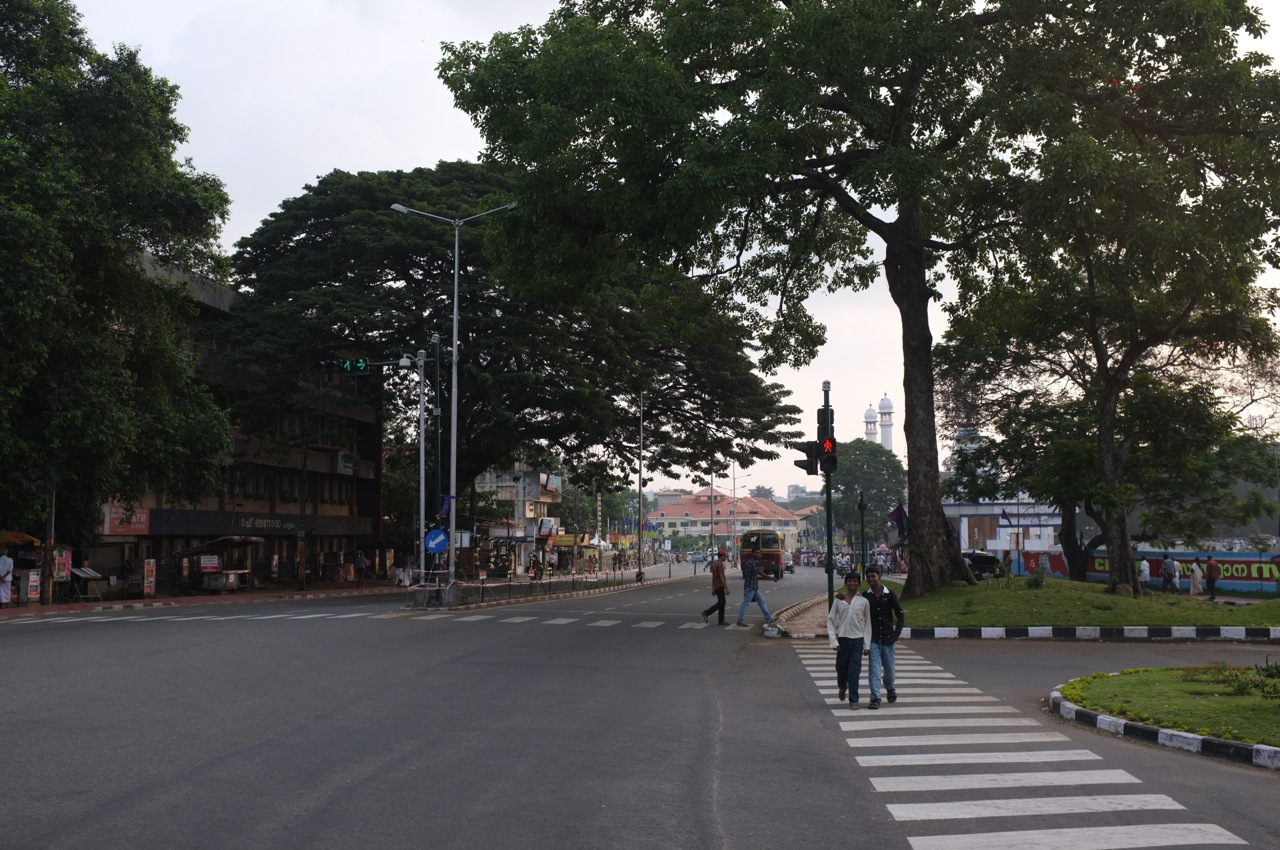
MG Road at Palayam

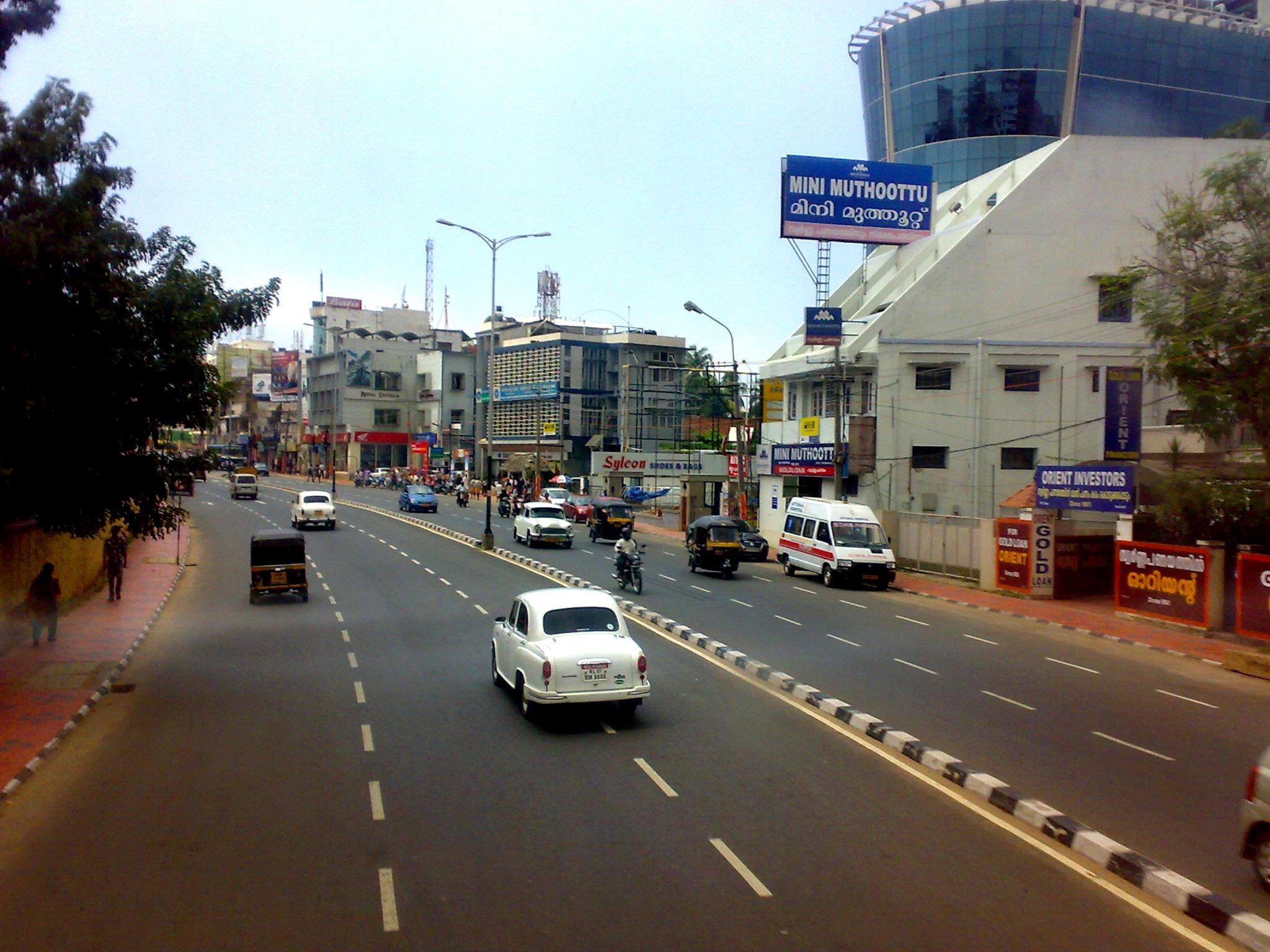
A view of MG Road

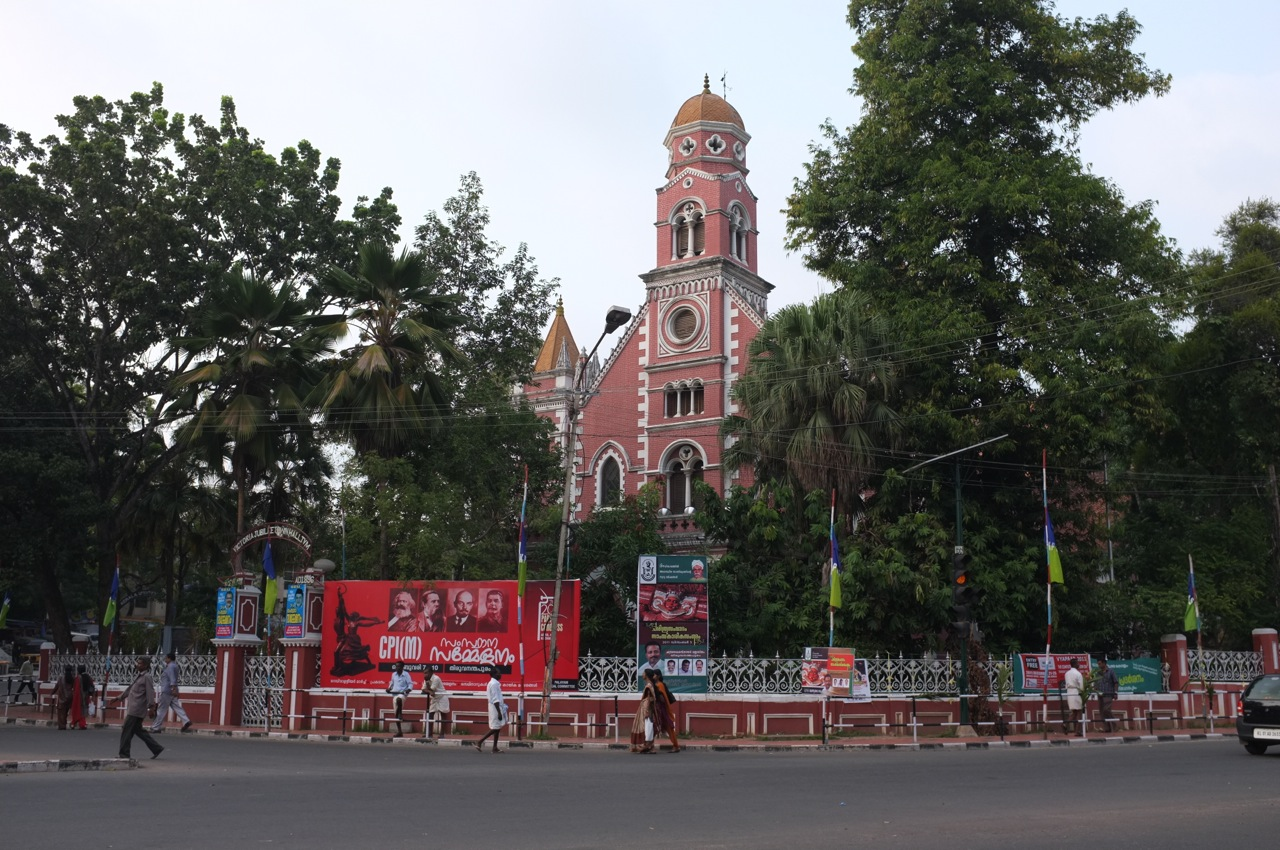
VJT Hall in MG Road, Palayam
