= Aryankuzhi =

- Town
- Location in Kerala, India
- Coordinates: 8°27′46″N 76°56′37″E
- Country: India
- State: Kerala
- District: Thiruvananthapuram

Government
  - Type: Democratic

Languages
  - Official: Malayalam, English
- Time zone: UTC+5:30 (IST)
- PIN: 695009
- Telephone code: 0471
- Vehicle registration: KL-01

Aryankuzhi is a residential area in Thiruvananthapuram, Kerala, India. It is just 3 kilometres away from the heart of Trivandrum city.

== Places near by Aryankuzhi ==
Kamaleswaram (1 km), Manacaud (1 km), Kallattumukku (1 km), Chenthitta (1 km) are the nearby localities to Aryankuzhi.

== Location ==
Aryankuzhi is 3 km from the city centre. Privately owned and Kerala State Road Transport Corporation buses plying in the Kovalam route from East Fort pass through Kamaleswaram. A bypass of National Highway 47 passes 1 km to the west of Aryankuzhi. The nearest railway station is Thiruvananthapuram Central, 3 km away. The nearest airport is Thiruvananthapuram International Airport, 4 km away. It is also near Kamaleswaram, which is a bustling residential region situated on the way from East Fort to Thiruvallam, in Thiruvananthapuram. The 2000-year-old Thiruvallam Sree Parasurama Temple at Thiruvallam is about 5 km from Aryankuzhi.

== Religion ==
The population of Aryankuzhi mainly practices Hinduism and Islam. The place is famous for the presence of Aryankuzhi Devi Temple.

=== Religious Places ===
- Aryankuzhi Devi Temple
- Aryankuzhi Ganapathy Temple
- Aryankuzhi Hanuman Temple

== Government offices near Aryankuzhi ==
1. Govt. Kamaleshwaram Higher Secondary School
2. Harbour Engineering Department
3. Department of Fisheries
4. Muttathara Village Office
