= Konchiravila =

Town in Thiruvananthapuram, India

Coordinates: 8°27′41″N 76°57′20″W

Konchiravila is a small settlement that lies near Manacaud in Thiruvananthapuram, India. It is around 3 km from East Fort and can be reached by local buses.

It has the Konchiravila Devi Temple, a shrine dedicated to the Hindu goddess Durga. The annual Pongal festival celebrated here attracts many devotees from far and near.

The Attukal Bhagavathy Temple is situated nearby, as well as the Government Homeo Medical College, on the banks of the Killiyar. The Thiruvananthapuram Central Railway Station (4 km) and Trivandrum International Airport are the nearest railhead and airport respectively.
