= Paravankunnu =

- Town
- Location in Kerala, India Paravankunnu (India)
- Coordinates: 8°28′28″N 76°56′51″E
- Country: India
- State: Kerala
- District: Thiruvananthapuram

Government
  - Type: democratic

Languages
  - Official: Malayalam, English
- Time zone: UTC+5:30 (IST)
- PIN: 695026
- Telephone code: 0471
- Vehicle registration: KL-01

Paravankunnu is a suburb of Thiruvananthapuram, the capital of Kerala, India. Paravankunnu is situated between Ambalathara, Thiruvananthapuram and Kallattumukku.

== Location ==
Paravankunnu is 5 km from the city centre. Privately owned and KSRTC buses plying in the Kovalam route from East Fort pass through Ambalathara. A bypass of National Highway 47 passes 2 km to the west of Paravankunnu. Nearest railway station is Thiruvananthapuram Central, around 5 km away. Nearest airport is Thiruvananthapuram International Airport, around 6 km away. Paravankunnu is a bustling residential region situated on the way from East Fort to Thiruvallam, in Thiruvananthapuram. The famous Pazhanchira Devi Temple and Children's Hospital is situated here. The 2000-year-old Thiruvallam Sree Parasurama Temple at Thiruvallam is 3 km away from Paravankunnu.

== Religion ==
The population of Paravankunnu mainly practices Hinduism and Islam.
