= Manacaud =

- Town
- Location in Kerala, India
- Coordinates: 8°28′28″N 76°56′51″E
- Country: India
- State: Kerala
- District: Thiruvananthapuram

Government
  - Type: Democratic

Languages
  - Official: Malayalam, English
- Time zone: UTC+5:30 (IST)
- PIN: 695009
- Telephone code: 0471
- Vehicle registration: KL-01

Manacaud is a locality in Thiruvananthapuram, the capital of Kerala, India. This place is situated between Kamaleswaram and Attakulangara on East Fort - Kovalam - Vizhinjam Road. The United Arab Emirates embassy is also situated in Manacaud.

== Location ==
Manacaud is 2 km from the city centre. Privately owned and KSRTC buses plying in the Kovalam route from East Fort pass through Manacaud. The bypass of National Highway 47 passes 1 km to the west of Manacaud. Nearest railway station is Thiruvananthapuram Central, around 1.5 km away. Nearest airport is Thiruvananthapuram International Airport, around 4 km away. The place has seen a tremendous development in the past ten years with the widening of Killipalam bypass road which ends at Attakulangara junction, around 500 meters away from Manacaud junction. Manacaud is a bustling residential region situated on the way from East Fort to Thiruvallam, in Thiruvananthapuram. Manacaud is just a km to the south of East Fort and about 2 km south-west of Karamana.

== Religion ==
The population of manacaud mainly practices Hinduism, Islam and few followers of Christianity. Manacaud Dharma Sastha Temple is situated there, it draws its significance, since the deity of this temple 'Sasthaavu' is believed to be the brother Attukal Devi, the deity of Attukal Temple. Attukal Devi visits the temple every year, a day after the famous 'Attukal Pongala' festival, to see her brother. Manacaud Vallya Palli and Central Juma Masjid (Thaikka palli) are the famous mosques situated here. Irumkulangara Durga Devi Temple and Mukkolakkal Bhagawathi Temple are two major Hindu temples in Manacaud. Sahaya Matha Church, is a Roman Catholic church situated in manacaud.AGM CSI Church Manacaud is located near Balavan Nagar.Kuthiramalika Palace Museum, Sree Padmanabhaswamy Temple, Sree Varaham Temple, Pazhavangadi Ganapathy Temple, Attukal Bhagavathy Temple, Konchiravila Devi Temple and Bhajanapura Palace are located within a 1.5 km radius from Manacaud. The 2000-year-old Thiruvallam Sree Parasurama Temple at Thiruvallam is 5 km away from Manacaud.

== Other Places ==
There is SUT (Sree Uthradom Thirunal) Mother & Baby Hospital, previously known as Zensa Hospital and Span Hospital for many years, situated very close to Karthika Thirunal Govt.Vocational Higher Secondary For Girls, Government Teachers Training School. As the girls High School is more than 75 years old, this landmark is known as Manacaud Girl's High School junction since then. KIMSHEALTH Medical Centre is also situated in Manacaud (Kamaleswaram) with multiple specialities functioning as an Outpatient Centre with lab and pharmacy.
