= Pazhanchira Devi Temple =

Hindu temple in Kerala, India

- പഴഞ്ചിറ ദേവീ ക്ഷേത്രം
- Location in Kerala Pazhanchira Devi Temple (India)

Religion
- Affiliation: Hinduism
- District: Thiruvananthapuram
- Deity: Devi
- Governing body: Pazhanchira Devi Temple Trust

Location
- Location: Paravankunnu
- State: Kerala
- Country: India
- Interactive map of Pazhanchira Devi Temple
- Coordinates: 8°28′28″N 76°56′51″E

Architecture
- Type: Traditional Kerala style

Website
- Official website

Pazhanchira Devi Temple is a Hindu temple situated between Ambalathara and Paravankunnu in Thiruvananthapuram district of Kerala state, India. It is about 3.2 km (2.0 mi) to the south of Padmanabhaswamy temple in Thiruvananthapuram. The temple is 8 km (5.0 mi) from Kovalam beach, 4 km (2.5 mi) from Trivandrum International Airport, 3 km (1.9 mi) from Thiruvananthapuram, 3 km (1.9 mi) from Attukal temple and 2 km (1.2 mi) from Thiruvallam Parasurama temple. This heritage structure is placed under the list of monuments of national importance.

== Synopsis ==
The abode of Sree Pazhanchira Devi Temple is one of the most ancient temple, almost 700 years old and was installed by a 'Siddhayogi' who worshipped the Devi. Gradually this place was converted into a temple and there a place was given to the Yogi on the western side of the Sree Kovil. A kavu (small forest patch) which houses the serpent Gods is common in Travancore, which preserves the beauty and atmosphere gifted by nature. The temple has been recently renovated with a new chuttambalam which is an excellent example of Kerala Vasthu Vidya and temple architecture in the new age.

== Deities and sub-deities ==
The Goddess devi is the main deity in this temple. One important aspect of the temple is that the deity appears as an avatar of AdiParasakthi. Makayiram is considered as the star of the deity. There are many upadevathas (sub-deities) adjacent to the temple, and it has remanded, according to the Deva Prashnam by expert astrologers.

The main upadevathas on the premises are

1. Yogishwaran
2. Lord Ganesh
3. Rektha Chamundi
4. Nagaraja
5. Brahm Rakshas
6. Madan Thampuran
7. Navagraha

=== Darshan ===
- Morning - 5.30 to 10.00
- Evening - 5.00 to 8.00

== Festivals ==
The festival of the temple is on the Malayalam month of 'Meenam' and starts on the day of 'Makayiram'. Makayiram is considered as the star of the deity. On every full moon day a special pooja known as 'Aiswarya Mahalakshmi Pooja' is conducted here. The pooja begins at 5 in the evening and ends at 6 p.m.

- Samooha Laksharchana
- Mandala Vratham — Festival in connection with the annual Utsavam of Sabarimala.
- Vinayaka Chathurthi — Pooja to the Lord Ganapathy.
- Pooja Vaypu — Identical to Dussera festival (Saraswathy Pooja and Vidyarambham).
- Ayilya Pooja — Milk, flowers etc. offered to serpent god and special rites. Monthly Pooja in Ayilyam day except in the months of Mithunam and Karkidakom.
- Ayilyolsavam — Nagaroottu and Sarpabali in the month of Thulam
- Ramayana Parayanam and BhagavathiSeva — All days of Karkidakom (evening).

== Location ==
Paravankunnu is 3.2 km from the city centre. Privately owned and KSRTC buses plying in the Kovalam route from East Fort pass through Ambalathara. A bypass of National Highway 47 passes 2 km to the west of Paravankunnu. Nearest railway station is Thiruvananthapuram Central, around 4 km away. Nearest airport is Thiruvananthapuram International Airport, around 6 km away. Paravankunnu is a bustling residential region situated on the way from East Fort to Thiruvallam, in Thiruvananthapuram. The famous Attukal Bhagavathi temple is 2 km away from pazhanchira and Sree Alukadu Devi Temple is 1.5 km away from here, The 2000-year-old Thiruvallam Sree Parasurama Temple at Thiruvallam is 1.6 km away from Paravankunnu.

== See also ==
- Parvathi
- Devi
- Ambalathara, Thiruvananthapuram
- List of Hindu temples in Kerala
- Temples of Kerala
