= Thottam, Manacaud =

- town
- Location in Kerala, India
- Coordinates: 8°28′28″N 76°56′51″E
- Country: India
- State: Kerala
- District: Thiruvananthapuram

Government
  - Type: democratic

Languages
  - Official: Malayalam, English
- Time zone: UTC+5:30 (IST)
- PIN: 695009
- Telephone code: 0471
- Vehicle registration: KL-01

Thottam, Manacaud is a small region near by Manacaud, which is a suburb of Thiruvananthapuram, the capital of Kerala, India. It located between Kamaleswaram and Manacaud. Irumkulangara Durga Devi Temple is a famous Hindu temple in Thottam, Manacaud, Manacaud P.O, Thiruvananthapuram, Kerala,. AGM CSI Manacaud Church is one of the churches in Manacaud region located in MLA road (near Balavan Nagar).

== Location ==
Thottam, Manacaud is 3 km from the East Fort/Thiruvananthapuram central. It is located between Kamaleswaram and Manacaud. It is mainly a residential area, and KSRTC buses plying in the Kovalam route from East Fort pass through Manacaud. A bypass of National Highway 47 passes 1 km to the west of Manacaud. Nearest railway station is Thiruvananthapuram Central, around 1.5 km away. Nearest airport is Thiruvananthapuram International Airport, around 3 km away.

== Residence associations ==
1. Annikkavilakom Residents Association
2. Erumkulangara Residents Association
3. Shanthi Gardens
4. Balavan Nagar Etc

== Religion ==
The population of thottam, manacaud mainly practices Hinduism, Islam and few followers of Christianity. Thottam is known for the Irumkulangara Durga Devi Temple. The abode of Sree Irumkulangara Durga Bhagavathi is one of the most ancient temples in Kerala. The temple is located on the bank of two ponds from where it got its name: "Erum" means two and "kulam" means pond. It is hard to find any other temple in Thiruvananthapuram, which preserves the beauty and atmosphere gifted by nature. It is believed that the temple has a relationship with Sree Padmanabha Swamy Temple, one of the temples in Thiruvananthapuram. In ancient times, priests from Sree Padmanabha Swamy Temple are believed to arrive at Erumkulangara by country boats for performing pooja and rituals. There is also SNDP thottam unit here.
