= Irumkulangara Durga Devi Temple =

Irumkulangara Durga Bhagavathi Temple
- Irumkulangara Durga Devi Temple, Manacaud, Thiruvananthapuram, Kerala

Religion
- Affiliation: Hinduism
- District: Thiruvananthapuram
- Deity: Durga
- Governing body: Irumkulangara Durga Devi Temple Trust

Location
- Location: Manacaud
- State: Kerala
- Country: India
- Coordinates: 8°28′13.4″N 76°56′39.8″E

Architecture
- Type: Traditional Kerala style

Specifications
- Temple: One
- Elevation: 34.57 m (113 ft)

Website
- irumkulangaratemple.org

Irumkulangara Durga Bhagavathi Temple (Malayalam: ഇരുംകുളങ്ങര ദുര്‍‌ഗ്ഗാദേവി ക്ഷേത്രം) is a Hindu temple in Thottam, Manacaud P.O, Thiruvananthapuram, Kerala, India. It is about 1.8 kilometres to the southwest of Sree Padmanabhaswamy Temple in Thiruvananthapuram city.

== Geography ==
It is located at Manacaud.

== History ==
The abode of Sree Irumkulangara Durga Bhagavathi is one of the most ancient temples in Kerala. The temple is located on the bank of two ponds from where it got its name: "irum" means two and "kulam" means pond. It is believed that the temple has a relationship with the famous Sree Padmanabha Swamy Temple, one of the famous temples in Thiruvananthapuram. In ancient times, priests from Sree Padmanabha Swamy Temple are believed to arrive at Irumkulangara by country boats for performing pooja and rituals.

== Events and architecture ==
Unlike other Durga devi temples, rituals like Thottampaattu and Ottam are restricted here. Red coloured flowers, except thetti, are banned. Other flowers such as tulsi, jasmine, lotus, Nandyarvattom, etc. are used.

A kavu (small forest patch) which houses the serpent Gods is common in Travancore. The pond in front of the temple gives a beautiful reflection of it. The Temple Thanthri Brahmasree Tharananalloor Parameshwaran Namboodiripad (same as Sree Padmanabhaswamy and Koodalmanikyam temples) and now the temple is under the control of Sree Irumkulangara Durga Devi Temple Trust.

It was renovated with a new chuttambalam and sivelippura which is an excellent example of Kerala Vasthu Vidya and temple architecture in the new age. The renovation was carried out under the guidance of Vastu Shasthra expert Kanippayyur Krishnan Namboodiripad; the temple architect was Manacaud S Narayanamoorthy and it was inaugurated by Sree Uthradom Thirunal Marthanda Varma Maharaja of Travancore on 25 December 2009.

== Deities and sub-deities ==
The Goddess Durga is the main deity in this temple. One important aspect of the temple is that the deity appears as Durgabhagavathi, an avatar of Adi Parasakthi. Karthika is considered as the star of the deity.

There are many upadevathas (sub-deities) adjacent to the temple, and it has been remade according to the Deva Prashnam by expert astrologers recently.

The main upadevathas on the premises are

1. Ganesha
2. Nagaraja
3. Brahm Rakshas
4. Bhairava Moorthy
5. Madan Thampuran
6. Navagraha

We can see a kavu (grove) which houses the serpent gods and is common in Travancore. The temple kavu was awarded by the Kerala Forest and Wildlife Department as one of the best maintained.

In 2011, the temple created a Nakshtravanam (trees relating to birth stars) on the premises.

=== Darshan ===
- Morning: 5:00 AM to 10.00 AM
- Evening: 5.00 PM to 8.00 PM

== Festivals ==
The Painkuni Mahothsavam, the major festival of the temple, is mostly held in the month of March. It lasts for 10 days and ends with Pongala and Ezhunnallathu. In 2023, Painkuni Mahothsavam was from 17–26 March. The main Ulsavam was on 26 March 2023.

The other festivals in this temple are:

- Mandala Vratham — Festival in connection with the annual Utsavam of Sabarimala
- Vinayaka Chathurthi — Pooja to the Lord Ganapathy
- Pooja Vaypu — Identical to Dussera festival (Saraswathy Pooja and Vidyarambham)
- Karthika — Kazhchakula Samarpanam, Navakabhishekam, Karthika Pongala, Annadhanam (all months)
- Ayilya Pooja — Milk, flowers etc. offered to serpent god and special rites. Monthly Pooja in Ayilyam day except in the months of Mithunam and Karkidakom.
- Ayilyolsavam — Nagaroottu and Sarpabali in the month of Thulam by Pambumekkattumana Karanavar Brhamasri P S Sreedharan Namboodiripad
- Ramayana Parayanam and Bhagavathi Seva — All days of Karkidakom (evening)
- Vavu Bali — In the month of Karkidakom

== Education aid ==
On all Vidyarambham day evening, Irumkulangara Durga Bhagavathi Temple and its devotees give cash awards to SSLC and Plus Two economically backward students living around the temple based on merit. For this, the temple has an education fund and most of the devotees give cash prizes in memory of their relatives.

== Transportation ==
=== Road ===
KSRTC Central Bus station is near the Thiruvananthapuram Central Railway Station. There are so many bus services available for travel to other cities. Have to get down at either manacaud or kamaleswaram. Privately owned and KSRTC buses plying in the Kovalam route from East Fort pass through Manacaud and Kamaleswaram.

=== Rail ===
The nearest railway station is at Thiruvananthapuram Central Railway Station railway station about 3.5 km from the temple.

=== Air ===
Thiruvananthapuram International Airport, about 3 km away from temple.

== See also ==
- Parvathi
- Thottam, Manacaud
- Kamaleswaram Mahadeva Temple
- List of Hindu temples in Kerala
- Temples of Kerala
