= K. C. S. Mani =

Indian revolutionary

- Born: Konattumatam Chidambara Iyer Subrahmania Iyer; 2 March 1922; Ambalappuzha, Travancore, British India
- Died: 20 September 1987 (aged 65); Pulayanarkotta, Thiruvananthapuram, Kerala, India
- Known for: Attempt of assassination on C. P. Ramaswamy Iyer
- Political party: Revolutionary Socialist Party
- Spouse: Lalithammal

Konattu Madam Chidambara Iyer Subrahmania Iyer, known better as K. C. S. Mani (2 March 1922 – 20 September 1987), was an Indian socialist activist of Kerala who is known for his attempt of assassination on C. P. Ramaswamy Iyer, the then Diwan of Travancore, a princely state in India. This incident was a turning point in the history of Kerala, forcing the Diwan to leave Travancore and flee to Madras after assenting to merge Travancore with the Union of India.

== Historical background ==
In July 1947, preparation were in progress in India for the transfer of power from the British colonial rule. All princely states in India were given a choice to either remain independent, or join either of the states of India or Pakistan. C. P. Ramaswamy Iyer chose to make Travancore a sovereign state, with full executive powers vested on the Diwan. He declared this intention in his American model constitution. There were oppositions from all quarters. The Diwan chose to suppress the revolts with raw power. On 18 July 1947, Chithira Thirunal Balarama Varma, the Maharaja of Travancore, on advice of the Diwan, made the declaration that, Travancore will announce sovereignty on the 26 August.

== Assassination attempt ==
On 25 July 1947, then 25-year old Mani attacked the Diwan in front of the erstwhile Music Academy (now the Swathi Thirunal College of Music) in Thiruvananthapuram, following a concert in the evening. Ramaswamy Iyer was wounded. Following the incident on 25 July, the Maharaja informed the Viceroy of India of the decision to join the Union of India. On 19 August 1947, C. P. Ramaswamy Iyer formally resigned as Diwan.

== Later life ==
After the independence, Mani served as a member of the local panchayat for more than a decade. He also contested to the Kerala Legislative Assembly from the Kuttanad constituency in 1965, as an independent candidate (not the nominee of any political party, But RSP leaders instructed him to submit the nomination, So he could be considered as an RSP Candidate), but without success.

Mani felt alienated by the party as well as the state in the later years of his life. He spent his last days abandoned and struggling with diseases. When he suffered from loneliness, he found a solace in devotion. It is also said that the feeling of guilt affected him deeply. During some nights, after Ambalapuzha temple was closed, he conducted 'sayana pradakshinam' around the temple. Sometimes, he went to Sabarimala without informing anyone. Mani died on September 20, 1987, at an age of 65, in the Chest Diseases Hospital, Pulayanarkotta, Thiruvananthapuram. He was cremated in his home premises on the next day. His brother-in-law conducted the rituals. The place where he was cremated is now part of railway line. His wife Lalitha outlived him for 30 years, dying on June 14, 2017, aged 77.

== Cultural depictions ==
- T. Sivasubramania Iyer, played by Mohanlal in Rakthasakshikal Sindabad (1998).
