= Killi River =

Killi Killiyaar
- Native name: കിള്ളിയാർ (Malayalam)

Location
- Country: India
- Counties/Province: Kerala

Physical characteristics
- Source
  - location: Near Karippur in Nedumangad taluk, India
- Mouth: Karamana River
  - location: Pallathukadavu, India
- Length: 22 km (14 mi)

Killi river, also called Killiyar, the main tributary of Karamana River, originates at Theerthankara close to Panavur in Nedumangad taluk of Thiruvananthapuram district. The river enters Thiruvananthapuram city at Vazhayila and flows through Mannammoola, Maruthankuzhi, Edapazhinji, Jagathi, Killippalam, Attukal, Kalady South and merges with Karamana River at Pallathukadavu. Attukal Temple is situated on the banks of this river.
