= John Kuzhinapurath =

Indian priest (1904–1994)

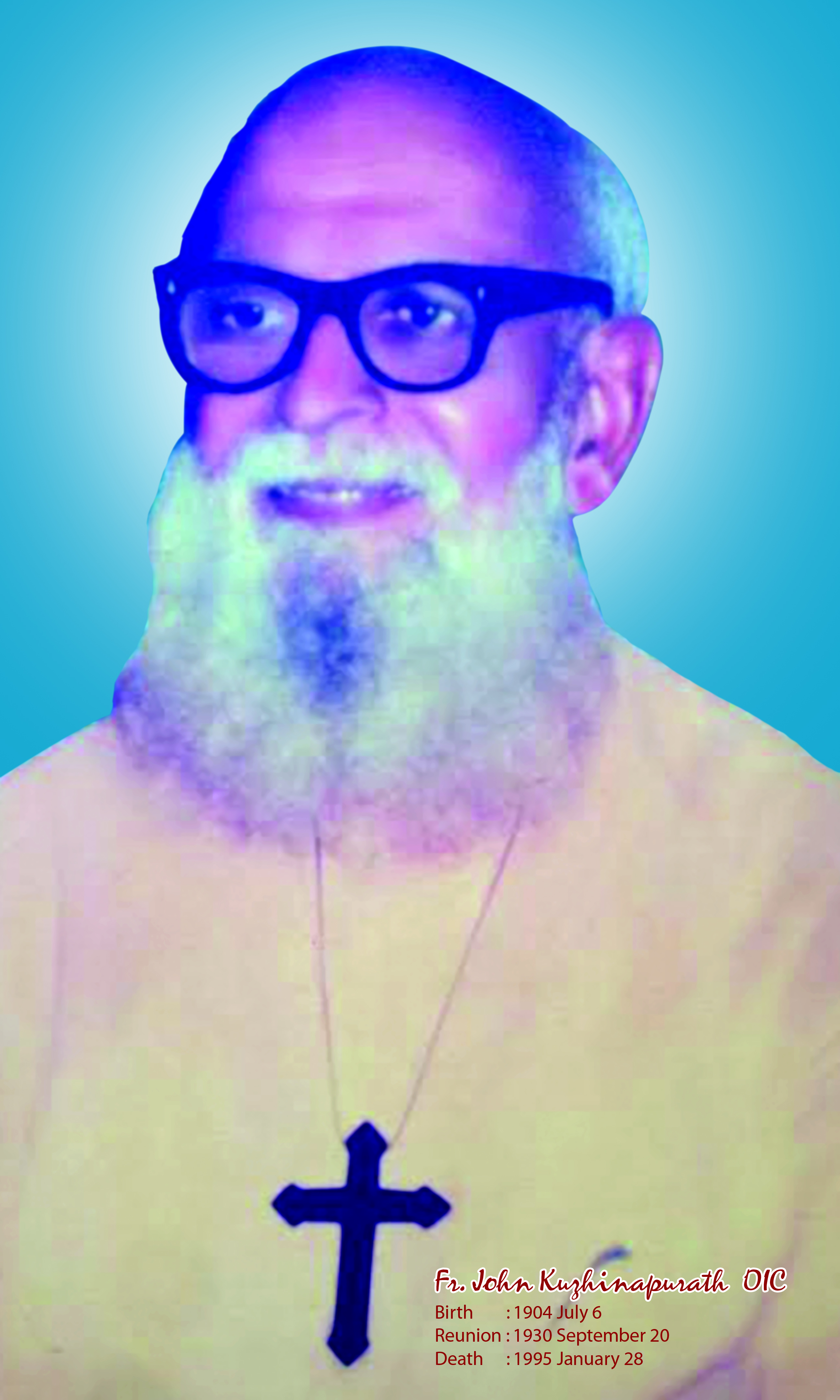
Fr. John Kuzhinapurath OIC

John Kuzhinapurath, OIC, (1904–1994), a great philanthropist was among the first priests who united with the Catholic Church along with Archbishop Mar Ivanios on 20 September 1930 in the process of the formation of the Syro-Malankara Catholic Church.

== Early life ==
The Five Pillars of 1930 Reunion Event: Metropolitan Archbishop Mar Ivanios, Bishop Jacob Mar Theophilos, Fr. John Kuzhinapurath OIC, Dn. Alexander OIC, Mr. Chacko Kilileth

Kuzhinapurath was born on 6 July 1904 at Omallur near Pathanamthitta, Kerala, India. He was the youngest child of Pakalomattom Kuzhinapurath Eapen and Kocheetha. He had his primary education in Government Middle School at Pathanamthitta. He was ordained deacon by the Orthodox Metropolitan Mar Baselios in 1919. Then he studied for priesthood at M.D. Seminary, Kottayam, Kerala. Kuzhinapurath continued his secular studies at St. Thomas High School, Pala, Kerala. He completed his intermediate education at C.M.S College, Kottayam.

== Monastic practice ==
Kuzhinapurath joined the Bethany Ashram, the monastic order founded by Archbishop Mar Ivanios. He made his first monastic profession and Mar Ivanios ordained him priest in 1929. Kuzhinapurath followed Mar Ivanios and reunited with the Catholic Church on 20 September 1930.

He had a monastic formation of one year in the Carmelite Monastery at Trivandrum. He served the Bethany Ashram as novice master and Superior General. He worked in several mission centers at Thiruvalla and Trivandrum. His mission work was mainly among the underprivileged of the society. He worked as the chaplain of TB Sanatorium at Pulayanarkotta. He cycled several kilometers every day to do missionary and charitable work. He started the prayer centre at the T. B. Sanitorium at Pulayanarkotta, Trivandrum. He founded the famous St. Jude's Shrine at Vettinadu, Trivandrum by the side of Kerala State High Way, SH 1.

He wrote the book Sahana Yanjgam (Sacrificial Suffering).

Kuzhinapurath died on 28 January 1994.

The Bethany Ashram published a special issue of Bethany Sabdam, a compilation of memories about Kuzhinapurath in 1995.

== Commemoration ==
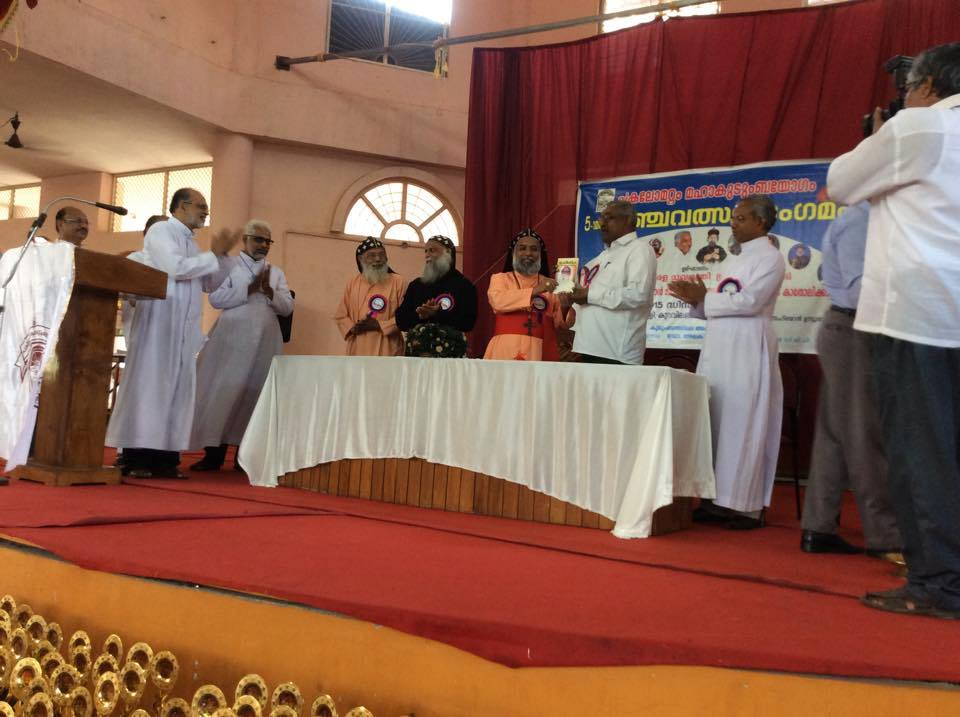
Release of the Second Edition of Preshitha Deepam

The death anniversary and commemoration of Kuzhinapurath was celebrated on 30 January 2010. Thomas Kuzhinapurath and seven other priests from Kuzhinapurath family concelebrated Holy Qurbono at Bethany Ashram, Nalanchira, Trivandrum, where Kuzhinapurath is buried, followed by a commemoration meeting presided by Moran Mor Baselios Cleemis. Mor Cleemis released the book Preshita Deepam, the biography of Kuzhinapurath, written by Peter C. Abraham. Baselios Cleemis said Fr. John was truly a refuge to the poor and the destitute. The second edition of the biography of Kuzhinapurath, "Preshita Deepam" was released at the 5th quinquennial assembly of the Great Pakalomattom family at Kuravilangadu on 19 December 2015. Cardinal Baselios Cleemis, the President of Catholic Bishops'Conference of India released book by giving the first copy to Alexander Jacob, IPS, the former Director General of Police, Kerala, India. Every year pilgrims from Vettinadu, Vembayam and Chiramukku, the mission stations he served for several years come and celebrate Holy Qurbono at Bethany Ashram, Nalanchira, where he was buried and pray at his tomb under the leadership of their parish priest on 28 Jan., his death anniversary. His family members will gather together and commemorate him on second Saturday of January every year at his home parish at Cheekkanal, Omallur, Pathanamthitta Kathikan Basilica John staged the story of John Kuzhinapurath in the form of a Kadhaprasangam at Omallur on 13 January 2018. In 2020 Dr. Shirley Stewart, the former head of the English Department of Mar Ivanios College, Trivandrum translated "Preshitha Deepam" into English with the title "The Mission Lamp"

== Sources ==
- Fr. Thomas Inchaykkalodi, Archbishop Mar Ivanios, Vol. 1, Bethany Publications, Kottayam, 2006.
- Peter C. Abraham, Peshita Deepam: Fr. John Kuzhinapurath OIC, Malankara Catholic Publications, Trivandrum, 2010.
- Dr. Shirley Stewart, Mission Lamp: Fr. John Kuzhinapurath OIC, Malankara Catholic Publications, Trivandrum, 2020.
