= Aryankuzhi Devi Temple =

- Devi Temple, Aryankuzhi, Kerala

Religion
- Affiliation: Hinduism
- District: Thiruvananthapuram
- Deity: Aryankuzhi Bhagavathi

Location
- Location: Aryankuzhi
- State: Kerala
- Country: India
- Coordinates: 8°27′53.5″N 76°56′34.6″E

Specifications
- Temple: One
- Elevation: 33.5 m (110 ft)

Aryankuzhi Devi Temple is a devi temple at Aryankuzhi, Trivandrum district, Kerala, India.
