= Karikkakom Devi Temple =

Hindu temple in Kerala, India

Karikkakom Sree Chamundi Devi Temple
- Karikkakom Devi Kshetram
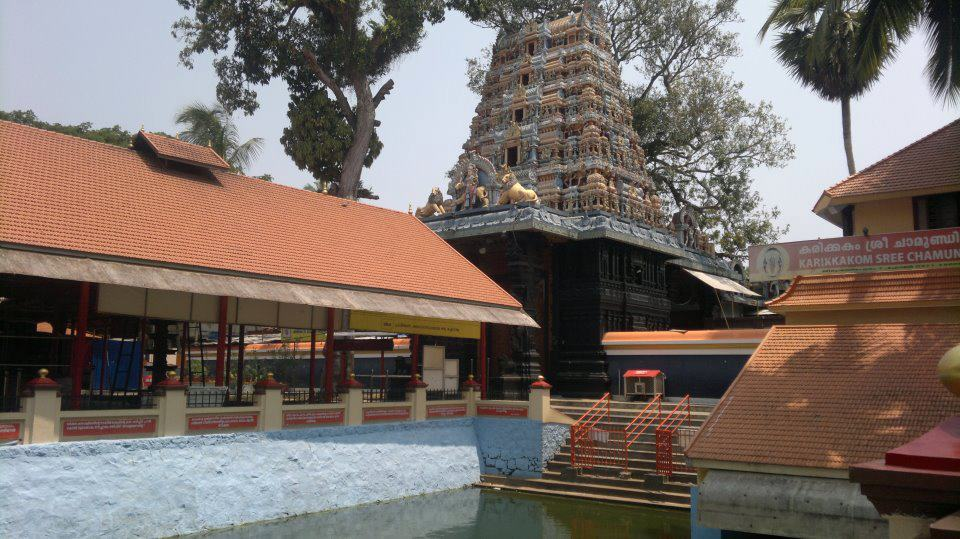
- Karikkakom Sree Chamundi Devi Temple

- Chamundi Devi Temple, Karikkakom, Thiruvananthapuram, Kerala

Religion
- Affiliation: Hinduism
- District: Thiruvananthapuram
- Deity: Chamundi Bhagavathi

Location
- Location: Karikkakom
- State: Kerala
- Country: India
- Coordinates: 8°30′16.9″N 76°54′12.0″E

Architecture
- Type: Dravidian architecture (Kovil)

Specifications
- Temple: One
- Elevation: 37.3 m (122 ft)

Karikkakom Sree Chamundi Devi Temple or Karikkakom Devi Temple is a temple to three Hindu goddess Chamundi located in Thiruvananthapuram, India at Karikkakom. It is more than 600 years old and enshrines a Panchaloha idol of the goddess Karikkakathamma – an incarnation of Chamundi. Chamundi Devi is worshiped there in three different forms: Maha Chamundi, Raktha Chamundi, and Bala Chamundi.

== Main Shrine ==
Chamundi Devi herself is considered a fierce form of Kali, but the same Chamundi Devi is worshipped here in three different forms in three different adjacent sanctums situated adjacently. An idol of the Devi is located in the extreme left main sanctum.

Karikkakom Devi Temple

Though the cardinal deity is Chamundi Devi, Rektha Chamundi, Bala Chamundi, Sastha, Ganapathi, Yakshiyamma, Bhuvaneshvari, Ayiravalli and Yogeeswaran are also accommodated in the temple.

=== Rektha Chamundi ===
On the right side of the Devi Nada is the Rakta Chamundi nada. There is no vigraha (idol) in this nada but only a wall painting of the Devi in a Rowdra Bhava. The Karikkakom temple has historical importance since this temple was utilized during the reign of the Maharajas to prove the truth of certain crimes. Accused culprits were brought to the temple and were allowed to proclaim their innocence in front of Raktha Chamundeswari's sanctum. They had to put 21 panam or coins in the nada and promise to tell the truth. The Devi was believed to protect them if they were truthful and punish them if they were not. So nobody dared to tell a lie in front of the deity. This nada was opened only for this particular ritual.

The Chamundi Devi form in the main sanctum is considered as in a calm state, whereas Raktha Chamundi is considered as fierce, but helps devotees to fulfill their wishes. It is believed that if offerings and prayers are given to Raktha Chamundi Devi, she will remove obstacles and problems caused by enemies, cure chronic ailments, and so on.

=== Bala Chamundi ===
Bala Chamundi Devi, as the name suggests, is in childhood form. Couples without a child worship devi and present articles like cradles and toys to be blessed with a child. Offerings given to the Devi also help cure ailments in children.

=== Nagar kavu ===
Outside the Devi Temple wall, the nagar kavu and pond belonging to the temple are located. This nagar kavu is rich in numerous varieties of trees and creepers as well as medicinal plants. To remove Sarpa dosha, devotees can offer Ayilya Pooja and Nurum palum, Archana for Nagar and more every month on the Ayilyam day.

== Pongala festival ==
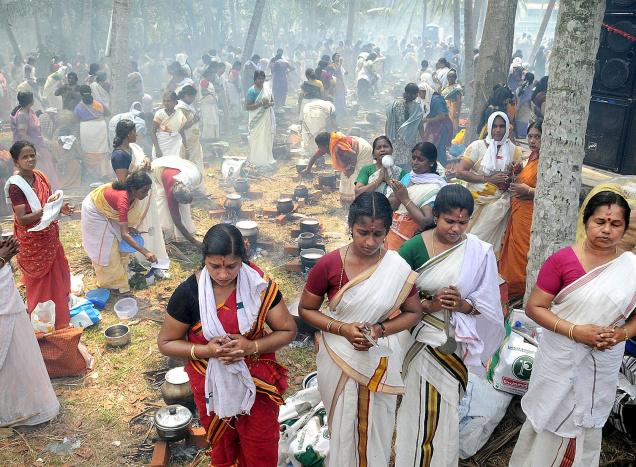
Devotees offering Pongala at Karikkakom Devi Temple in Thiruvananthapuram

The annual festival is in the month of Meenam for seven days. Millions of women gather every year in the month of Meenam around this temple and prepare Pongala (rice cooked with jaggery, ghee, coconut as well as other ingredients) in the open in small pots to please the goddess. The idol of Devi is carried out in a golden chariot around the temple on the day before Pongala and thousands of devotees gather to witness it.

== Other festivals ==
The other festivals in this temple are:

1. Mandala Vratham - Festival in connection with the annual Utsavam of Sabarimala
2. Vinayaka Chathurthi - Pooja to the Lord Ganapathy
3. Pooja Vaypu - Identical to Dussera festival (Saraswathy Pooja and Vidyarambham)
4. Sivarathri - Siva Pooja
5. Karthika - Karthika Deepam
6. Ayilya Pooja - Milk, flowers etc. offered to serpent God and special rites
7. Aiswarya Pooja - On all full moon (Pournami) days
8. Shasta Pratishta Dinam - Every year in the month of Makaram on the Rohini day Shasta Pratishta Dinam is celebrated in the temple.
9. Vishu Kani - On the first day of the month of Medam people come here for the Vishukani Darshanam.

== Special rituals ==
=== Bali Sadhya ===
This ritual takes place in the month of Karkatakam on the Karthika day. On this day inside the temple special poojas are performed for the Guru and Mantramoorthi. Brahmins are given food and dress. After this ceremony devotees are given Bali Sadhya. This is a very old custom of the temple, which is followed even today.

=== Nirayum Puthiriyum ===
The paddy taken from the land belonging to the temple is first offered to the Devi.

=== Uthrada Taneerkuda ===
This is another important festival conducted during the month of Chingam on Uthradam day. This is a very ancient and important pooja.

=== Kodi Charthu ===
This is a ritual conducted in the month of Chingam on Thiruvonam day after the Nirmalya Darshanam. The devotees offer the Devi yellow dress during the festival.

=== Ayilyam Ootu ===
The temple performs poojas for the Nagas on the ayilyam day in the month of Makaram. This is known as Vallya Ayilyam. From ancient times this pooja is performed for propitiating the Nagas and removing Naga Dosha.

== Transportation ==
Karikkakom is just 7 km from Thiruvananthapuram city. The nearest airport is Thiruvananthapuram International Airport. The nearest railway station is Kochuveli Railway Station and the nearest bus station is Thiruvananthapuram Central Bus Station.

Those who travel via Kollam on reaching Kazhakoottam junction should take the straight road via World Market junction and from there take the right turn via Vazhavila to the temple. Those who take the M.C. Road should come through Kesavadaspuram via Palayam, Peta, Chakka bypass. Those coming from Neyyattinkara, via East Fort, Enchakkal junction can reach the temple using the bypass road. The temple can also be reached via Chakka Attuvarambu road.

== See also ==
- Temples of Kerala
- Documentary on Karikkakom Devi Temple
