= Attukal =

- Hindu pilgrimage centre
- Attukal, Thiruvananthapuram, Kerala
- Coordinates: 8°28′14″N 76°57′24″E
- Country: India
- State: Kerala
- District: Thiruvananthapuram
- Elevation: 22.04 m (72.3 ft)
- Time zone: UTC+5:30 (IST)
- PIN: 695005
- Telephone code: +91471xxxxxxx

Attukal is a Hindu pilgrimage centre located on the banks of Killi river, in the capital city of Thiruvananthapuram, Kerala, India. It is situated about two kilometres to the south-east from the Padmanabhaswamy Temple.

The Attukal Bhagavathy Temple, one of the ancient temples of South India, is popularly described as Sabarimala of women, as women form the major portion of devotees. The goddess of the temple of Attukal is worshipped as the Supreme Mother, creator, preserver, and destroyer, of all beings.

== Legend ==
According to regional legend, the goddess Attukal Bhagavathy is the deified form of Kannagi, the heroine of the epic Cilappatikaram, written by Ilango Adigal, the Tamil poet. The story goes that after the destruction of the ancient city of Madurai, Kannagi left the city and reached Kerala via Kanyakumari, and on the way to Kodungalloor, took a sojourn at Attukal. She is venerated by devotees at the site as a mother goddess, believed to be able to relieve them of their distress and offer them protection.

== Events ==
The Pongala Mahotsavam is the most important festival of Attukal Bhagavathy Temple. This festival at Attukal has been entered into the Guinness book of world records as the largest congregation of women in the world. The offering of Pongala is a special temple practice prevalent in the southern part of Kerala and some parts of Tamil Nadu. It is a ten-day programme commencing on the Karthika star of the Malayalam month of Makaram-Kumbham (February–March) and closing with the sacrificial offering known as Kuruthitharpanam at night. On the ninth day, ie on the Pooram Star of the Makaram-Kumbham in the Malayalam month, the world-famous Attukal Pongala Mahotsavam takes place. The major part of the city itself at about 8 kilometre radius around the temple premises, where people of all caste, creed and religion, gather in open fields, roads, commercial institutions, premises of Government offices etc. emerges as a consecrated ground for observing Pongala rituals for more than 2.5 million women devotees assembling from different parts of Kerala and outside. The ceremony is mostly confined to women folk even though men can also observe the rituals. On the same day evening, there will be a procession from the temple to Manacaud Sree Dharma Sastha Temple accompanied by Kuthiyottam boys, and various artists performing different kinds of folk art forms which makes the procession so colorful. The enormous crowd which gathers in Thiruvananthapuram on this auspicious day is reminiscent of the Kumbhamela Festival of North India.

== See also ==
- Attukal Temple
- Attukal Pongala
- Sree Padmanabhaswamy Temple
