= Attakulangara =

- town
- Location in Kerala, India
- Coordinates: 8°28′28″N 76°56′51″E
- Country: India
- State: Kerala
- District: Thiruvananthapuram

Government
  - Type: Democratic

Languages
  - Official: Malayalam, English
- Time zone: UTC+5:30 (IST)
- PIN: 695023
- Telephone code: 0471
- Vehicle registration: KL-01

Attakulangara is a suburb of Thiruvananthapuram, the capital of Kerala, India. Attakulangara is situated between East Fort and Manacaud on East Fort - Kovalam - Vizhinjam Road.

== Location ==
Attakulangara is about 500 m from East Fort and about 500 m from Manacaud Junction. Privately owned and KSRTC buses plying in the Kovalam route from East Fort pass through Attakulangara. Nearest railway station is Thiruvananthapuram Central, around two km away. Nearest airport is Thiruvananthapuram International Airport, around four km away. Attakulangara is a bustling residential region situated on the way from East Fort to Thiruvallam, in Thiruvananthapuram.

== Main landmarks ==
1. Attakulangara Madan Kovil
2. Attakulangara Mosque
3. Ramachandran Textiles
4. Attakulangara Sub Jail, Women's Prison.
5. Fort Police Station
6. Attakulangara School, the 124-year-old Government Central High School situated here. The school was founded as the Native High School in 1889 by T. Marthandan Thampi who was also its first Headmaster. Later, the Government took over the school, renaming it as Attakulangara Vernacular School and sometime thereafter, renaming it again as Central High School, Attakulangara.
7. State Bank of India, Fort branch ( Formerly Known as State Bank of Saurashtra).
8. KSRTC Staff Training Centre.
9. Buhari Hotel.
10. M.P Industrial Training Centre.
