= Kamaleswaram =

- town
- Location in Kerala, India
- Coordinates: 8°28′28″N 76°56′51″E
- Country: India
- State: Kerala
- District: Thiruvananthapuram

Government
  - Type: democratic

Languages
  - Official: Malayalam, English
- Time zone: UTC+5:30 (IST)
- PIN: 695009
- Telephone code: 0471
- Vehicle registration: KL-01

Kamaleswaram is a suburb of Thiruvananthapuram, the capital of Kerala, India. It boasts having several temples and mosques which are of historic significance. Attukal Temple is located 1 km from Kamaleswaram. Padmanabhaswamy Temple is located 1.5 km from Kamaleswaram. Manacaud Valiyapalli is located 500 meters from Kamaleswaram. It is also in the vicinity of all major public services. The Trivandrum International Airport is located 4 km from Kamaleswaram. The Trivandrum Central Railway Station is located 3 km from Kamaleswaram. The East Fort bus terminal is located 2 km from Kamaleswaram. Kamaleswaram is situated between Kallattumukku and Manacaud.

== Geography ==
It is located at .

== Location ==
Kamaleswaram is 2 km from the city centre. Privately owned and KSRTC buses plying in the Kovalam route from East Fort pass through Kamaleswaram. A bypass of National Highway 47 passes 1 km to the west of Kamaleswaram. Nearest railway station is Thiruvananthapuram Central, around 3 km away. The nearest airport is Thiruvananthapuram International Airport, around 4 km away. Kamaleswaram is a bustling residential region situated on the way from East Fort to Thiruvallam, in Thiruvananthapuram. The 2000-year-old Thiruvallam Sree Parasurama Temple at Thiruvallam is 4 km away from Kamaleswaram.

== Religion ==
The population of Kamaleswaram mainly practices Hinduism and Islam. Kamaleswaram Mahadeva Temple is a famous temple in Kerala. It is located near by Govt. Kamaleshwaram Higher Secondary School.

== Government offices ==
1. Govt. Kamaleshwaram Higher Secondary School
2. Harbour Engineering Department
3. Department of Fisheries
4. Muttathara Village Office

== SNSS Library ==
SNSS (Sree Narayana Smaraka Grandhasala) Library is situated in kamaleswaram, which was established 50 years back.
