= Aryankuzhi Ganapathy Temple =

Aryankuzhi Ganapathy Temple also known as "Panayil Ganapathi Temple" is a famous Ganesha temple located at Aryankuzhi in Trivandrum district of Kerala, India. The Temple is a typical South Indian Temple which is divinely beautiful and grand in the way it is built. It is truly a blessing for the innumerable worshipers of Lord Ganesha.
