= Ambalathara, Thiruvananthapuram =

Ambalathara Vazhiyambalam
- Town
- Location in Kerala, India
- Coordinates: 8°28′28″N 76°56′51″E
- Country: India
- State: Kerala
- District: Thiruvananthapuram

Government
  - Type: Democracy

Languages
  - Official: Malayalam, English
- Time zone: UTC+5:30 (IST)
- PIN: 695026
- Telephone code: 0471
- Vehicle registration: KL-01

Ambalathara is a suburb of Thiruvananthapuram, the capital of Kerala, India. It is situated between Paravankunnu and Thiruvallam.

== Location ==
Ambalathara is 5 km from the city centre. Privately owned KSRTC buses plying the Kovalam route from East Fort pass through Ambalathara. A bypass of National Highway 47 passes 2 km to the west of Ambalathara. The nearest railway station is Thiruvananthapuram Central, about 4 km away. The nearest airport is Thiruvananthapuram International Airport, approximately 5 km away. Ambalathara is a bustling residential region situated on the route from East Fort to Thiruvallam, in Thiruvananthapuram. The 2000-year-old Thiruvallam Sree Parasurama Temple at Thiruvallam is 2 km from Ambalathara. The famous Pazhanchira Devi Temple is 1 km distant. There are many elite residential settlements in the area. The 'Kumarichanda' fish and vegetable market is open 16 hours a day, including hartal days. It is situated near the NH bypass.

== Religion ==
The population of Ambalathara mainly practices Hinduism, Islam and Christianity.

== Government institutions ==
- Milma Dairy, Ambalathara is situated just 1 km away from Ambalathara Junction.
- KSEB Office, Ambalathara
- The New India Assurance Com Ltd (portal Office 9074685104)

== Banks ==
- State Bank of India
- Indian Bank
- Muthoot Finance Bank
- Central Bank of India
- Bank of Baroda
- Muttathara Co-op Society

== Schools ==
- Govt UPS, Ambalathara
- Cordova Public School, near the NH 47 Bypass, Ambalathara
- City Nursery School, Ambalathara
- St. Philomina's G.H.S.S

== Colleges ==
- National college of arts and science.

== Hospitals ==
- Al Arif Hospital
- S.R Hospital Ambalathara

== Temples ==
- Sri Pazhanchira Devi Temple, Ambalathara
- Sri Ujjaini Mahakali Amman Temple
- Shiva Temple, Ambalathara
- Sri Mathavil Marutha Temple, Ambalathara
- Sri Vedanthara Temple, Ambalathara
- Pattanamkara Thamburam Temple, Ambalathara
- Hanumankavu, Ambalathara
- Sree Alukadu Devi Temple, 1 km from Ambalathara
