= Attukal Pongala =

Indian religious festival

Aatukaal Pongala
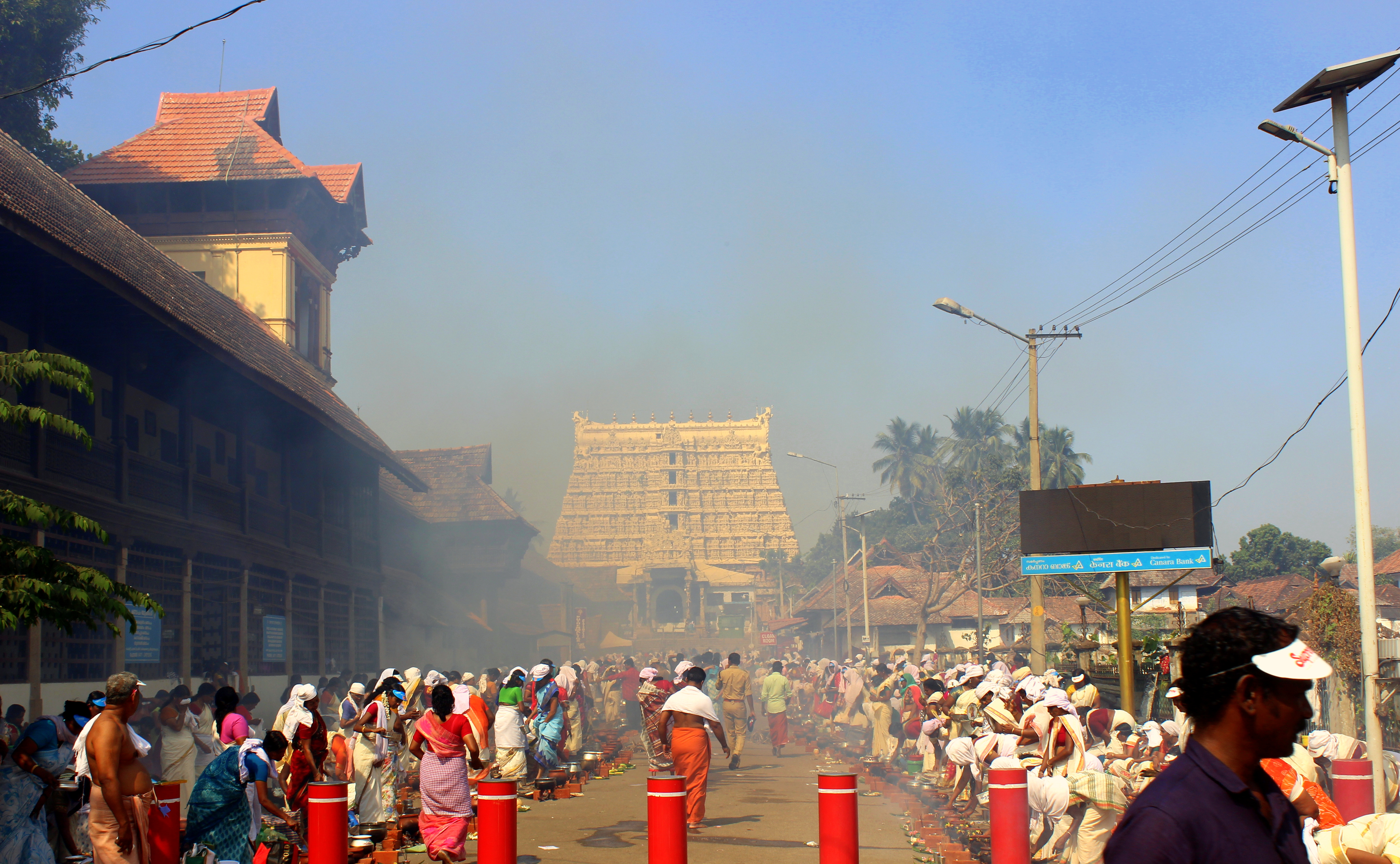
- Women gather near a temple and celebrate Pongala
- Observed by: Hindus of Kerala
- Type: Religious, cultural
- Date: per Hindu calendar
- 2026 date: 3 March
- Frequency: Annual

Attukal Pongala is a 10-day Pongala festival celebrated in the month of Kumbham (February–March), at the Attukal Temple in Thiruvananthapuram in the Indian state of Kerala. On the ninth day, a full moon day, considered the pongala day, millions of women gather near the temple surroundings and prepare consecrated food made of rice in earthen pots called Pongala and offer it to Attukal Amma, the Goddess of the Temple.

The presiding deity, Attukal Amma, believed to be goddess Bhadrakali is believed to join as one of the woman participants. The only men allowed near the temple are security personnel, temple authorities and priests.

== Guinness Record ==
The festival is marked as the largest annual gathering of women by the Guinness World Records. The celebration of this festival on February 23, 1997, when 1.5 million women participated entered the Guinness Book of World Records. In 2009, a new Guinness World Records celebrated 2.5 million women attendance. In 2026, about 40 lakhs or 4 million women participated in Attukal Pongala.

== Rituals ==
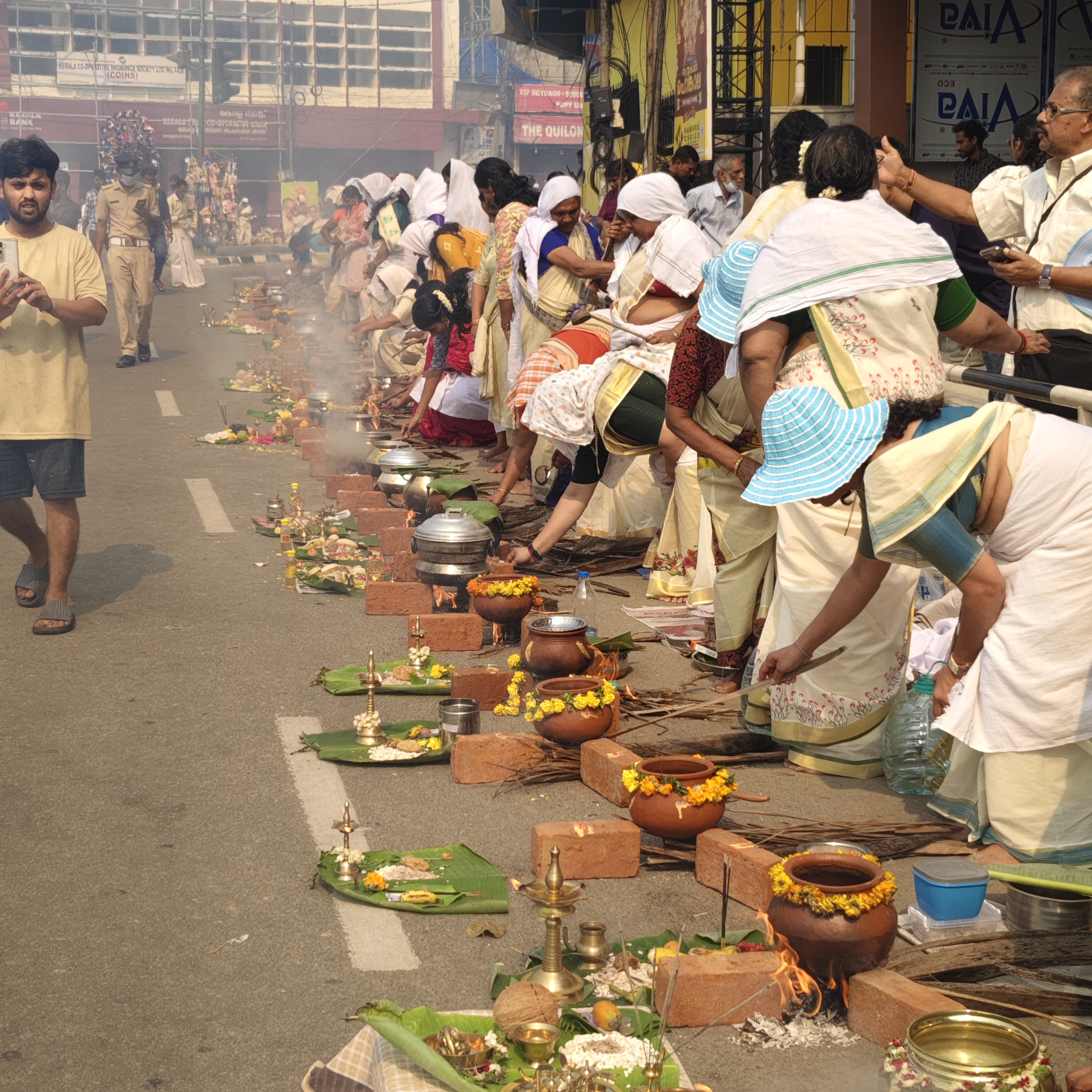
Devotees offering Pongala

The women observe a vratham before making Pongala. The vratam includes eating one meal per day and abstaining from eating non- vegetarian food or alcohol. On the Pongala day, a hearth is prepared and is purified by springling water. A traditional lamp is lit near it. The preparation of pongala is start after the main hearth called the Pandara Aduppu near the temple. After which the devotees starts preparing the Pongala. After which the fasting is broke by drinking coconut water, milk etc.

Different types of pongala offered are:

- Sharkkara pongala: Its made from raw rice, jaggery, coconut and cardamom. It is offered tobthe goddess for prosperity
- Vella pongala or Pongala payasam: Its made from raw rice, milk, banana and rock sugar. It is made as a votive offering, offered in gratitude for a fulfilled wish or answered prayer
- Vellachoru: It is made from raw rice, coconut and banana

Other than Pongala, the commonly made Nivedyams (libation) are:

- Therali appam: Its made from a dough made of rice flour, jaggery, banana and cardamom. Portions of this is folded inside Therali leaves and steamed.
- Mandaputtu: It is made from a mixture of roasted and powdered green gram, rice flour, jaggery, coconut and cardamom. Using hands, balls are made from the mixture and is steamed. It is offered for hair and head related ailments.
- Vellapayasam: It is made from chamba raw rice, coconut and ghee.
