= Kallattumukku =

- Town
- Location in Kerala, India
- Coordinates: 8°28′28″N 76°56′51″E
- Country: India
- State: Kerala
- District: Thiruvananthapuram

Government
  - Type: democratic

Languages
  - Official: Malayalam, English
- Time zone: UTC+5:30 (IST)
- PIN: 695009
- Telephone code: 0471
- Vehicle registration: KL-01

Kallattumukku is a suburb of Thiruvananthapuram, the capital of Kerala, India. Kallattumukku is situated between Ambalathara, Thiruvananthapuram and Kamaleswaram.

== Geography ==
It is located at .

== Location ==
Kallattumukku is 4 km from the city centre. Privately owned and KSRTC buses plying in the Kovalam route from East Fort pass through Kallattumukku. A bypass of National Highway 47 passes 2 km to the west of Kallattumukku. Nearest railway station is Thiruvananthapuram Central, around 4 km away. Nearest airport is Thiruvananthapuram International Airport, around 5 km away. Kallattumukku is a bustling residential region situated on the way from East Fort to Thiruvallam, in Thiruvananthapuram. The 2000-year-old Sree Parashuram Temple at Thiruvallam is 3 km away from Kallattumukku.

== Religion ==
The population of Kallattumukku mainly practices Islam and Hinduism.
