= Konchiravila Devi Temple =

- Devi Temple, KonchiraviIa, Thiruvananthapuram, Kerala

Religion
- Affiliation: Hinduism
- District: Thiruvananthapuram
- Deity: Devi

Location
- Location: Konchiravila
- State: Kerala
- Country: India
- Interactive map of Konchiravila Devi Temple
- Coordinates: 8.462361°N 76.956139°E

Architecture
- Elevation: 42.48 m (139 ft)

Website
- http://konchiravilatemple.org/index.html

Konchiravila Devi Temple is a temple located at Konchiravila in Trivandrum district of Kerala, India.
