= Chala, Thiruvananthapuram =

Chala
- Interactive map of Chala
- Former name: Chalai bazaar
- Location: Thiruvananthapuram, Kerala, India
- Coordinates: 8°28′56″N 76°57′10″E
- From: Killipalam
- To: East Fort

Chalai or Chalai bazaar is an old shopping area in Thiruvananthapuram, Kerala, India.

== History ==
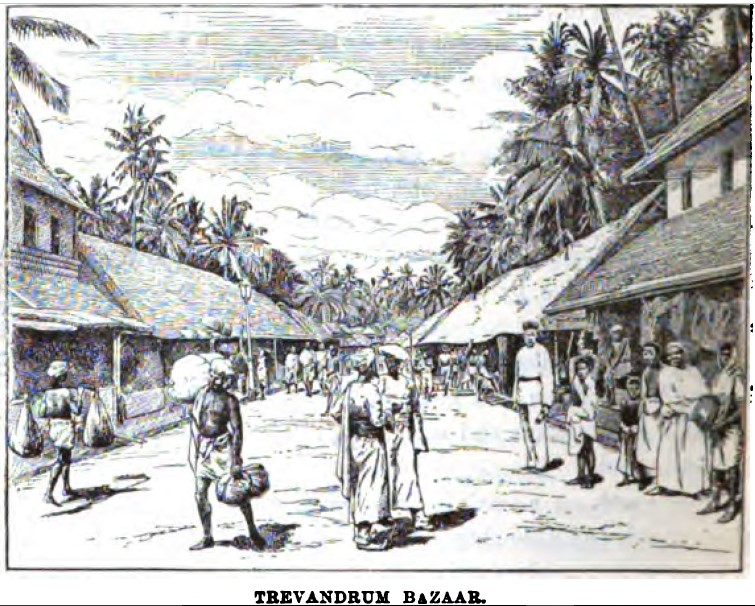
Trevandrum Bazaar (p.102, 1891), London Missionary Society

Chala was officially established towards the end of 18th century by Raja Kesavadas, Dewan of Travancore. The idea was to make Chalai bazar the central point for the supply of commodities to the Travancore kingdom. The Killi and Karamana rivers nearby was used to transport goods to the market. However, Mathilakom records of the Sree Padmanabha Swamy temple talk of a large market place that existed ‘near’ the temple, at least a century and a half before. Going further back to the 13th century, the composition Ananthapuravarnanam, which describes the capital city in detail, vividly describes a bustling marketplace with a fish market, textile market, provision market and so on. Merchants used to come in ships to trade at the market.

== Location ==
Chala market is located opposite of te East fort central bus stand where all the city buses terminate. The main entrance is located at the junction between Gandhi park and KSRTC bus garage. This entrance takes you to the Chala market road which is the main shopping area. This road terminates on the Kanyakumari highway (earlier known NH-47 and now renamed as NH-66) at a distance of about 1.5 km.

== Shopping ==
The market is spread through the narrow 2 km road connecting Killipalam and East Fort, which runs from East to West. The by-lanes too have an array of shops. The shopping street also consists of Karupattikada Juma Masjid, which is popularly known as 'Chala Juma Masjid'. This juma masjid was built in the first quarter of the 20th Century and is considered to be one of the oldest mosques in the district.

== Shops ==
The market sells almost every commodity, from fruits and vegetables, gold and silver to paint and hardware. Most shops are open from 9 am to 8 pm daily except Sundays. The place gets very crowded in the evenings. A number of good eateries also dot the area. The 2 km stretch is one of the busiest shopping streets in Kerala. Mubarak Hotel which started in 1970 is one of the most oldest restaurants in Chala. Another notable shop was Swamy and Brothers of Chala, once the go-to-place for all manner of threads and embroidery paraphernalia and dress materials.

== Footfalls ==
=== Peak Shopping Seasons ===
The Peak Shopping Season is during festivals of Vishu, Onam and Christmas. Chala market is the one place to visit during Onam Festival because it is here that one gets all kinds of flowers needed for the celebration. More than 10,000 kg of flowers will reach the Chala market during Onam.
