= Connemara Market =

- village
- Location in Kerala, India
- Coordinates: 8°30′10″N 76°57′4″E
- Country: India
- State: Kerala
- District: Thiruvananthapuram

Government
  - Body: Corporation of Trivandrum

Languages
  - Official: Malayalam, English
- Time zone: UTC+5:30 (IST)
- Vehicle registration: KL-01
- Coastline: 0 kilometres (0 mi)
- Climate: Tropical monsoon (Köppen)
- Avg. summer temperature: 35 °C (95 °F)
- Avg. winter temperature: 20 °C (68 °F)

Connemara market is situated at Palayam junction in Thiruvananthapuram city, in the state of Kerala, India. The recently renovated Market has merged with the Saphalyam Complex adjacent to it. The Palayam Market was established during 1857, when Sri Uthradom Thirunal was the Maharja of Travancore mainly to supply day to day essential commodities to the Army.

The Arched Gate of the Market was built subsequently and was inaugurated by Sir Robert Bourke, 1st Baron Connemara, Governor of Madras Presidency, when he visited Thiruvananthapuram during 1888. In his honour, the market was then named as "Connemara Market".
