= Pulayanarkotta =

Suburb in Thiruvananthapuram

Pulayanarkotta പുലയനാർകോട്ട
- village
- Location within Kerala
- Coordinates: 8.5203731°N 76.9122711°E
- Country: India
- State: Kerala
- District: Thiruvananthapuram

Government
  - Body: Thiruvananthapuram Corporation

Languages
  - Official: Malayalam
  - Minority: Tamil
- Time zone: UTC+5:30 (IST)
- PIN: 695033

Pulayanarkotta is a locality in Thiruvananthapuram, Kerala, India. The Southern Air Command is based at Pulayarnarkotta.

== Meaning of the name ==
Pulayanarkotta literally means the fort of the Pulaya's King.

== History ==
The Pulayanarkotta region was a region near Trivandrum and said to be related to the head of Pulaya community. A temple dedicated to Kalipulayan is at Attakulangara in Thiruvananthapuram.

== Organisations based in Pulayanarkotta ==
The Government Indian Institute of Diabetes center

The Government T.B Centre and Chest Diseases Hospital .

Southern Air Command (India).

== Religious institutions ==
- Kunjuveedu Kovil
- Kunnam Siva Temple
- Idiyadikkodu Bhagavathi Temple
- Peadikkadu Pangiyamma Bhagavathi Temple Trust
- Sree Bhagavathikkavu Devi Temple
- Juma Masjid
- Moosa Moulana Guidance Centre Masjid
- Kumarapuram Juma Masjid

== See also ==
- Ulloor
- Kazhakoottam
- Attakulangara
