= Kamaleswaram Mahadeva Temple =

Shiva temple in Kerala, India

Kamaleswaram Mahadeva Temple is a temple dedicated to Shiva situated in Kamaleswaram, near by Govt. Kamaleswaram Higher Secondary School, Thiruvananthapuram, Kerala, India.

== Management of the temple ==
The temple comes under the control of Travancore Devaswom Board.

== Important days ==
Maha Shivaratri and Thiruvathira are the days which attract crowds to the temple.

== Darsan ==
- Morning - 5.20 to 10.00
- Evening - 5.00 to 8.00

== Deities and sub-deities ==
The main deity of the temple is Hindu god Shiva. There are many upadevathas (sub-deities) adjacent to the temple, and it was remade, according to the Deva Prashnam by expert astrologers recently.

The main upadevathas on the premises are

1. Lord Ganesh
2. Nagaraja
3. Maadan Thampuran

== See also ==
- List of Hindu temples in Kerala
- Sreekanteswaram
