= Attakulangara School =

Attakulangara Central School

Location
- Trivandrum, Kerala; India; 8.4816°N 76.9478°E

Information
- Type: Public
- Established: 1889
- Website: http://www.gchs.online/

Government Central High School, also known as Attakulangara Central School, was founded in 1889. It is located in Trivandrum, the capital of Kerala province in India. The school's curriculum is in the Malayalam and Tamil languages. As of 2019, the school had just 100 students and was in a dilapidated state, with planned renovations halted amidst reports of disagreements over payments and construction details.

In 2020, the government started housing 223 homeless people on the school's campus. Since then, they have been actively clearing and grubbing the grounds, as well as cultivating vegetables.
