= Pongala =

Harvest festival

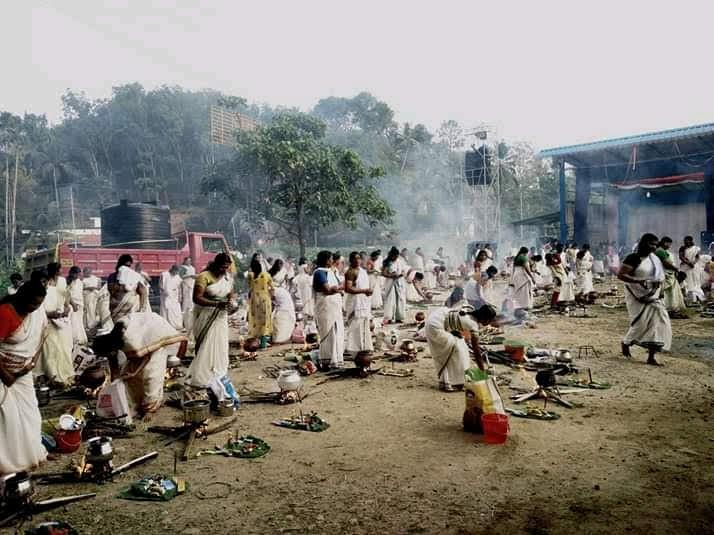
Pongala group stage

Pongala is a harvest festival of Kerala and Tamil Nadu. The name 'Pongala' means 'to boil over' and refers to the ritualistic offering of porridge made of rice, sweet brown molasses, coconut gratings, nuts and raisins. Generally women devotees participate in this ritual. Tamil people celebrate as Pongal.

== History ==
The origins of the Pongala festival may date to more than 1000 years ago. Epigraphic evidence suggests the celebration of the Puthiyeedu during the Medieval Chola empire days. Puthiyeedu is believed to represent the first harvest of the year.

== Attukal Bhagavathy Temple ==
The most famous and important among Pongala festivals happens at the Attukal Bhagavathy Temple at Attukal, Thiruvananthapuram, Kerala where around 3.5 million people participate. The festival in Attukal is considered by the population of the city, across their religious beliefs, as the biggest festival in the city.

Rice, coconut and jaggery are brought by women devotees along with round earthen pots for cooking. Women participating in the Pongala set up makeshift stoves using bricks and firewood along the roads, bylanes, footpaths and shop fronts in a radius of several kilometres around the temple. They squat next to their stoves to cook the mixture of rice, jaggery and coconut in earthen pots that is offered to the goddess seeking divine blessings. The Chief Priest of the temple lights the main hearth from the divine fire inside the sanctum sanctorum. This fire is passed on from one stove to the next.

Devi is essentially the mother goddess of ancient people of Kerala and Tamil Nadu. In this part of India this concept is evolved from the deity 'Kottave' worshiped on the peak of 'Aiyramala'. During ancient times, the entire population from the nearby villages converge on this hill and they stay there during the entire festivities lasting for several days. During this time social cooking used to take place by the women which was considered to be holy and liked by the goddess. Such social cooking naturally strengthened the bonds between these villages. This custom is still continued in the form of Pongala offering. This is one side of the character of the goddess. She is also the deity who brings victory in wars and therefore the goddess is offered blood sacrifice as stated in Sangam Literature. The word used for this is 'Kuruthi'. It means killing. The Tookaam ceremonies in some temples is a reminder of the ancient practice of blood sacrifice. This custom was modified later on to give 'Kuruthi' to the deity by killing cocks, which however is not practiced now.

Although Pongala festival is celebrated on a large scale mainly in the Attukal Temple, other temples where Pongala Samarpanam (though on a significantly smaller scale) is done are the Vellayani Devi Temple, Mankulam Parasakthi Devi Temple, Kovilvila Bhagavati Temple, Karikkakom Devi Temple, Puthiyakavu Bhagavathi Temple, Kanakathur Sree Kurumbakkavu Temple, Pulpally Seetha Devi Temple, Palakunnu Bhagavathi Temple, Mulluthara Devi Temple, Chakkulathukavu Temple, Anikkattilammakshethram and Thazhoor Bhagavathy Kshetram in Kerala.

The annual Pongala festival of Attukal Bhagavathy temple, has been entered in the Guinness Book of World Records as the largest congregation of women in the world. The festival draws over 2.5 million women on a single day in March to perform the Pongala ritual, and has been a center of attraction for devotees as well as tourists who visit Trivandrum during this season.
