= Thiruvallam Sree Parasurama Temple =

Sree Parasurama Temple
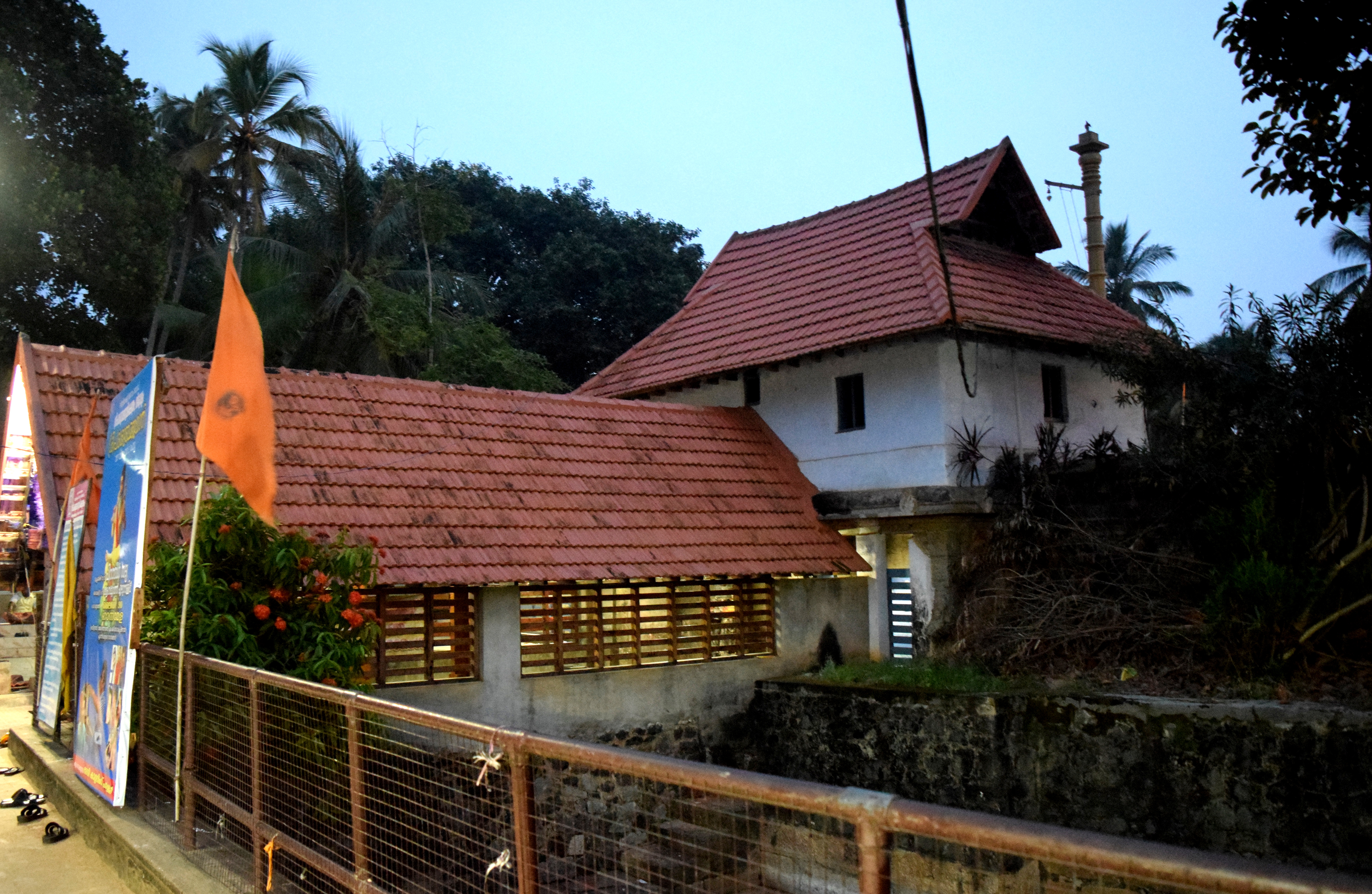

- Thiruvallam Sree Parasurama Temple (Kerala) Thiruvallam Sree Parasurama Temple (India)
- 8°26′29.8″N 76°57′18.4″E
- Location: Thiruvallam, Kerala, India

Site notes
- Elevation: 31

Thiruvallam Sree Parasurama Swami Temple is one of the most ancient temples of South India. It is situated on the banks of Karamana River near Thiruvallam, Thiruvananthapuram. It is the only temple in Kerala that is dedicated to Lord Parasurama. and counts among the 108 Abhimana Kshethrams of Vaishnavate tradition. Lord Shiva is also worshipped with equal importance in the same temple. The temple is 6 km from Kovalam Beach, 5 km from Thiruvananthapuram International Airport, 3 km from Thiruvananthapuram, 3 km from Attukal Temple 2 km from Pazhanchira Devi Temple and 1 km from Sree Alukadu Devi temple. This heritage structure is placed under the list of monuments of national importance. This temple is one among the very few temples, where lord Brahma is worshipped. Sub-shrines are built for Brahma, Matsya, Murukan and Veda Vyasa, Ayyappa, Krishna and Ganapathy.

The Head of Padmanabhaswamy was seen in this temple and the Feet at Tripadapuram Mahadeva temple. The Body of the swami is seen in the Ananthapadmanabhaswamy temple in Thiruvananthapuram Town. These 3 temples are visited in one go.

== Legend ==
Parts of Kerala were recovered back from the sea by the axe-wielding warrior sage Parasurama, the sixth avatar of Vishnu (hence, Kerala is also called Parasurama Kshetram i.e. 'The Land of Parasurama' in Hindu mythology). Parasurama threw his axe across the sea, and the water receded as far as it reached. According to the legendary account, this new area of land extended from Gokarna to Kanyakumari. The land which rose from sea was filled with salt and unsuitable for habitation; so Parasurama invoked the Snake King Vasuki, who spat holy poison and converted the soil into fertile lush green land. Out of respect, thereafter, Vasuki and all snakes were appointed as protectors and guardians of the land.

== History ==
It is believed that the temple was renovated last during the 12th to 13th centuries. The temple is considered a protected monument by the Archaeology Department of Kerala. It is famous for Balitharpanam (a tribute to ancestors) also called as Shrardham. During the karkidaka vavu day (a holiday in the Malayalam month of karkidakam), as part of the bali (a religious ritual), devotees pay homage to the departed souls of forefathers, after taking a dip in the holy water. This Temple is said to be built by the Brahmins primarily for Lord Parashurama as he gave these lands to them as Daanam.
