= Attukal Temple =

Hindu shrine

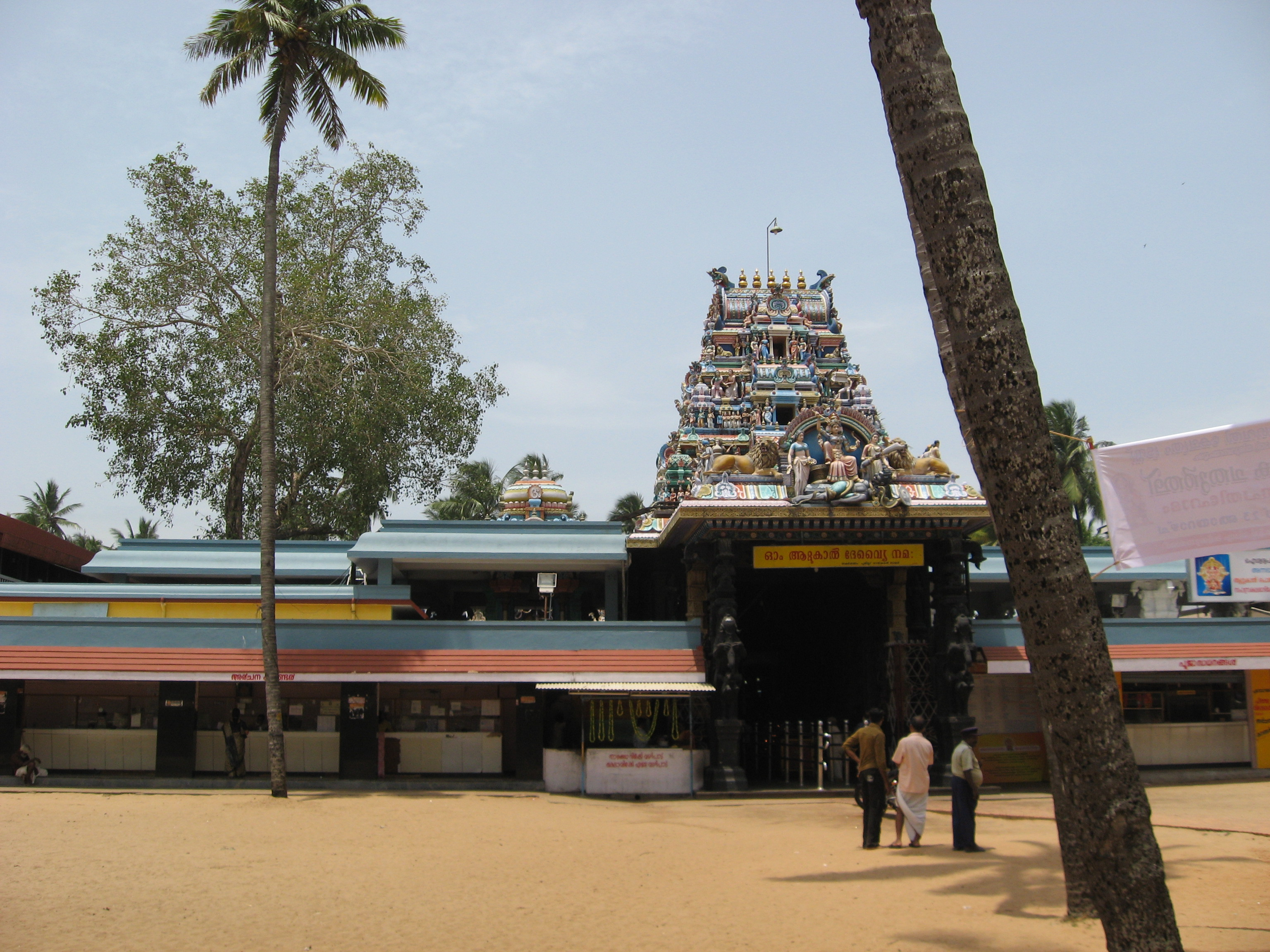

- Bhagavathy Amman Temple, Attukal, Thiruvananthapuram, Kerala Attukal Temple (India) Attukal Temple (Asia)

Religion
- Affiliation: Hinduism
- District: Thiruvananthapuram
- Deity: Bhadrakali/Kannagi
- Festival: Attukal Pongala

Location
- Location: Attukal
- State: Kerala
- Country: India
- Coordinates: 8°28′11.5″N 76°57′19.8″E

Architecture
- Elevation: 32.93 m (108 ft)

Website
- Attukal Bhagavathy Temple

The Attukal Bhagavathy Temple is a Hindu shrine located at Attukal in Kerala, India. It is situated near the heart of the city, two kilometres away from the Padmanabhaswamy Temple, East Fort, in Thiruvananthapuram. The goddess of the temple is identified with Bhadrakali, mounted over a vetala. She is also identified with Kannagi, the heroine of Ilango Adigal's epic Cilappatikaram.

The temple is renowned for the annual Attukal Pongal festival, in which over three million women participate. A festival that has figured in the Guinness Book of World Records for being the single largest gathering of women for a religious activity, the Attukal Pongala continues to draw millions of women with each passing year. Devotees believe that all of their wishes are fulfilled by the goddess, whose worship can allow them to attain salvation. The goddess is often venerated as all three goddesses of the Tridevi: Saraswati, Lakshmi, and Parvati.

== Legend ==
According to legend, the Goddess (Bhagavathy) revealed herself to the head (Karanavar) of an ancient family known as the Mulluveettil family in Attukal. One day, while the Karanavar was bathing in the Killi River as part of his evening rituals, a radiant young girl appeared before him from the opposite bank of the river and requested him to help her cross to the other side. After helping her cross the river, the Karanavar noticed the divine aura of the girl. Filled with reverence, he took her to his home and welcomed her respectfully. However, while making arrangements for her stay, the girl suddenly disappeared. Distressed by her disappearance, the Karanavar later saw the Goddess in his dream. She instructed him to establish her abode at a nearby sacred grove (kavu), at the spot marked by certain signs. The next morning, the Karanavar went to the grove and found three lines marked at a specific place. He consecrated the Goddess at that very spot. That sacred place where the goddess was installed later became what is now known as the Attukal Bhagavathy Temple.https://www.attukal.org/origin&history

Another legend ties the origin to the story of Kannagi as well. Kannagi was a faithful wife whose husband, Kovalan, was wrongly accused of theft and executed by the king of Madurai. She proved his innocence by showing her anklet (silambu) was different from the queen’s. Enraged by the injustice, she cursed the city, and Madurai was destroyed by fire. After this, she left the city and later became deified as a goddess symbolizing justice and chastity. The connection to Kannagi comes later, influenced by the Tamil epic Silappatikaram. Over time, people identified the local goddess with Kannagi because both represent divine feminine power and virtue. One temple legend says Kannagi came to Attukal after destroying Madurai and later appeared in a devotee’s dream asking for a temple to be built. Tradition also states she traveled west to Kerala and rested at Attukal, which became the temple site. The famous Attukal Pongala festival (women-centered) resonates with Kannagi’s image as a symbol of feminine strength and virtue. https://mythicremembering.com/books/silappatikaram/, Kannagi.

A different legend identifies the goddess of Attukal as Bhadrakali, who emerged from the third eye of Shiva to slay the asura king Daruka.

== Pongala festival ==
Attukal Pongala is the main. Attukal Pongala Mahotsavam is a 10 day festival which falls on February – March every year (Malayalam month of Kumbham). The festival begins on the Karthika star with the traditional Kappukettu and Kudiyiruthu ceremony, the idol of Devi, is embellished with Kappu (Bangles). The 9th day of the festival, 'Pooram day' is the major attraction, The Attukal Pongala day and the festival will conclude with the Kuruthitharpanam at 10th day uttara star night.

Millions of women gather every year in the month of Kumbham around this temple and prepare Pongala (rice cooked with jaggery, ghee, coconut as well as other ingredients) in the open in small pots to please the Goddess Kannaki. Pongala (literally means to boil over) is a ritualistic offering of a sweet dish, consisting of rice porridge, sweet brown molasses, coconut gratings, nuts and raisins. It is done as an offering to the presiding deity of the temple – the Goddess – popularly known as Attukal Amma. Goddess Attukal devi is believed to fulfill their wishes and provide prosperity.

== Other festivals ==
This temple also hosts the following festivals:

1. Mandala Vratham – Festival in connection with the annual Utsavam of Sabarimala
2. Vinayaka Chathurthi – Pooja to the Lord Ganapathy
3. Navaratri and Pooja Vaypu – Identical to Dussera festival (Saraswathy Pooja and Vidyarambham)
4. Sivarathri – Siva Pooja
5. Karthika – Karthika Deepa
6. Ayilya Pooja – Milk, flowers etc. offered to serpent God and special rites
7. Aiswarya Pooja – On all full moon (Pournami) days
8. Nirayum Puthariyum (Ramayana Parayanam) – During the month of Karkadakam
9. Akhandanama Japam – 4th Sunday of every month

== Gallery ==
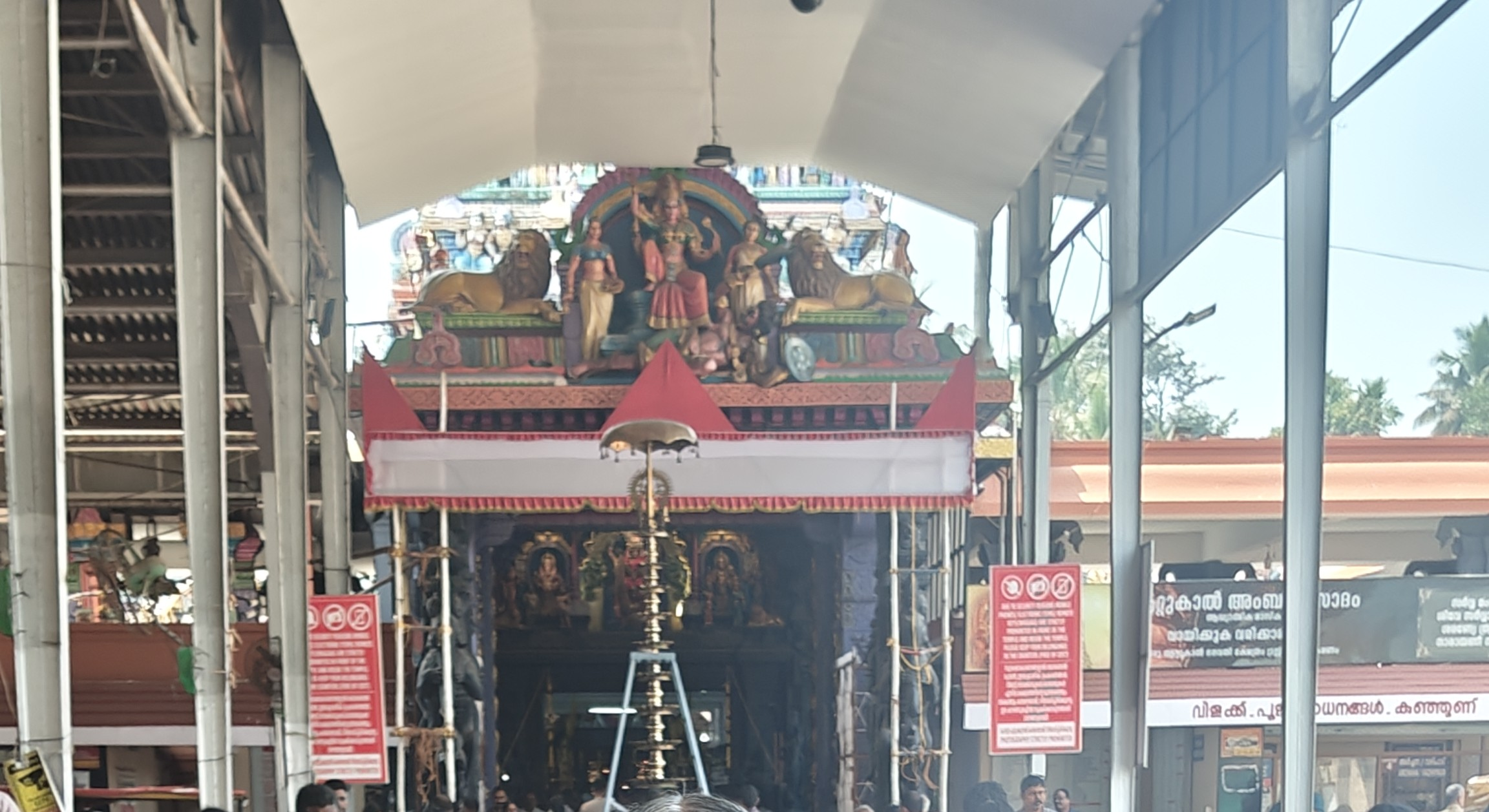
Temple Entrance

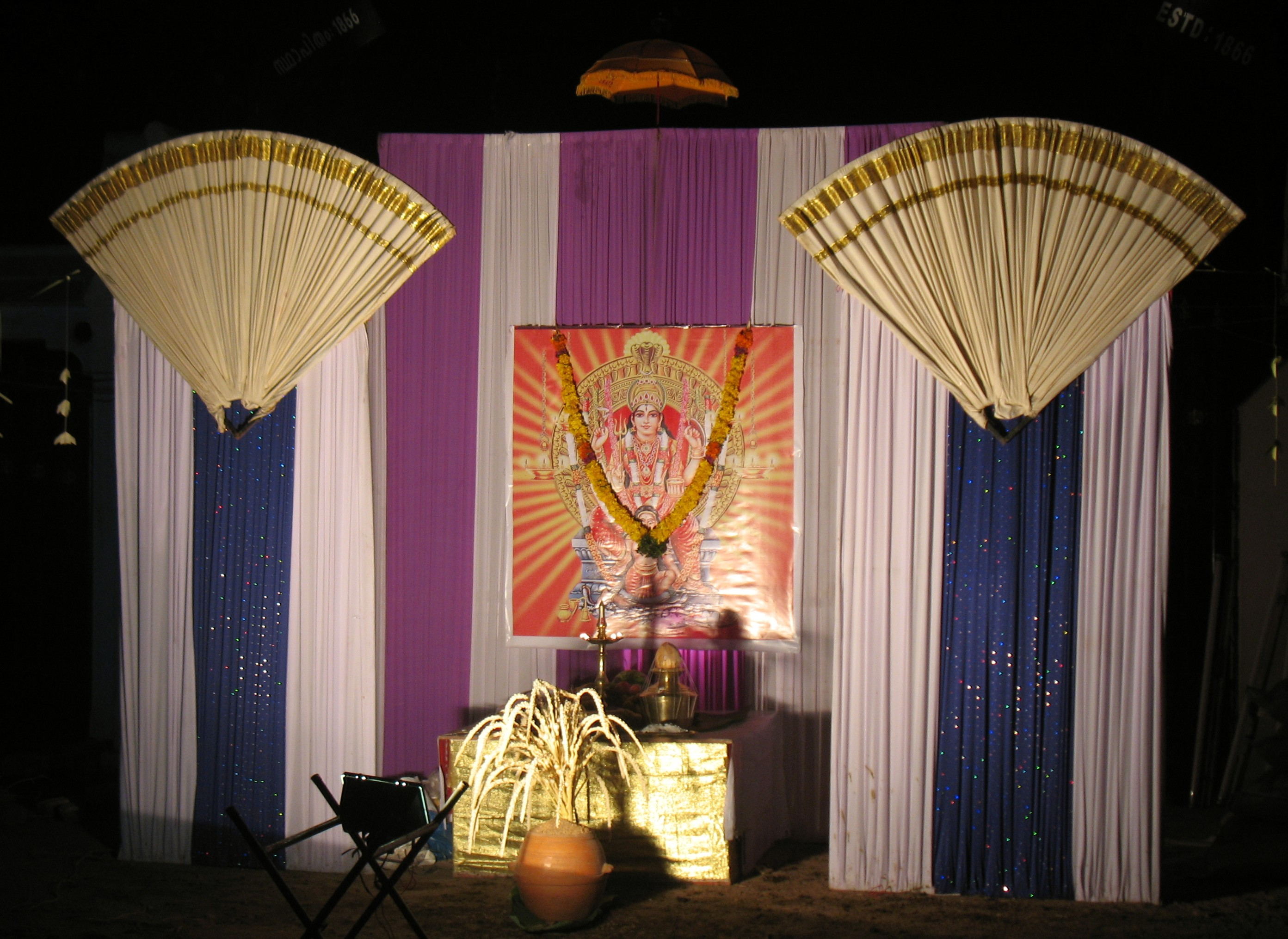
Image of Attukkal Bhagavathy venerated on Attukal Pongala.

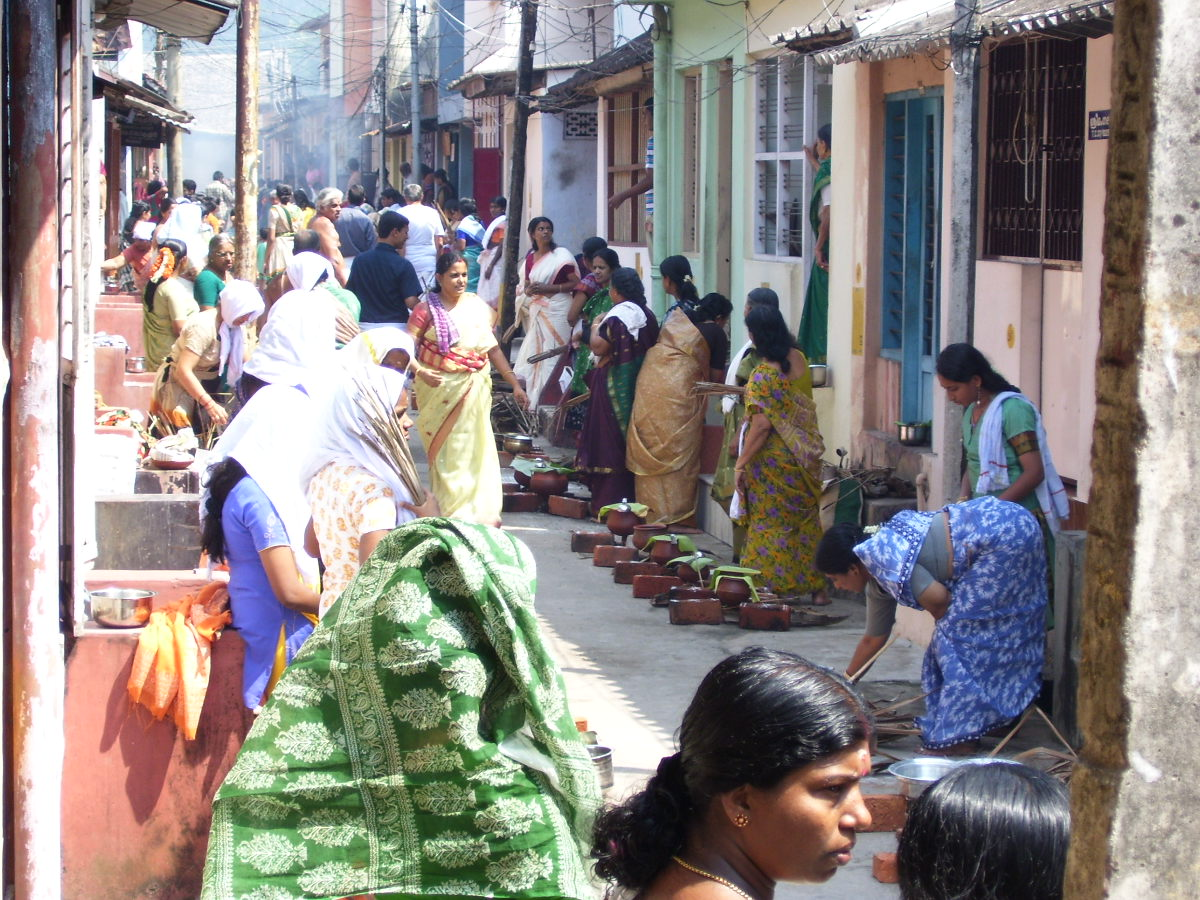
Worship during Attukal Pongala at Tippu Street, South Fort, Thiruvananthapuram.

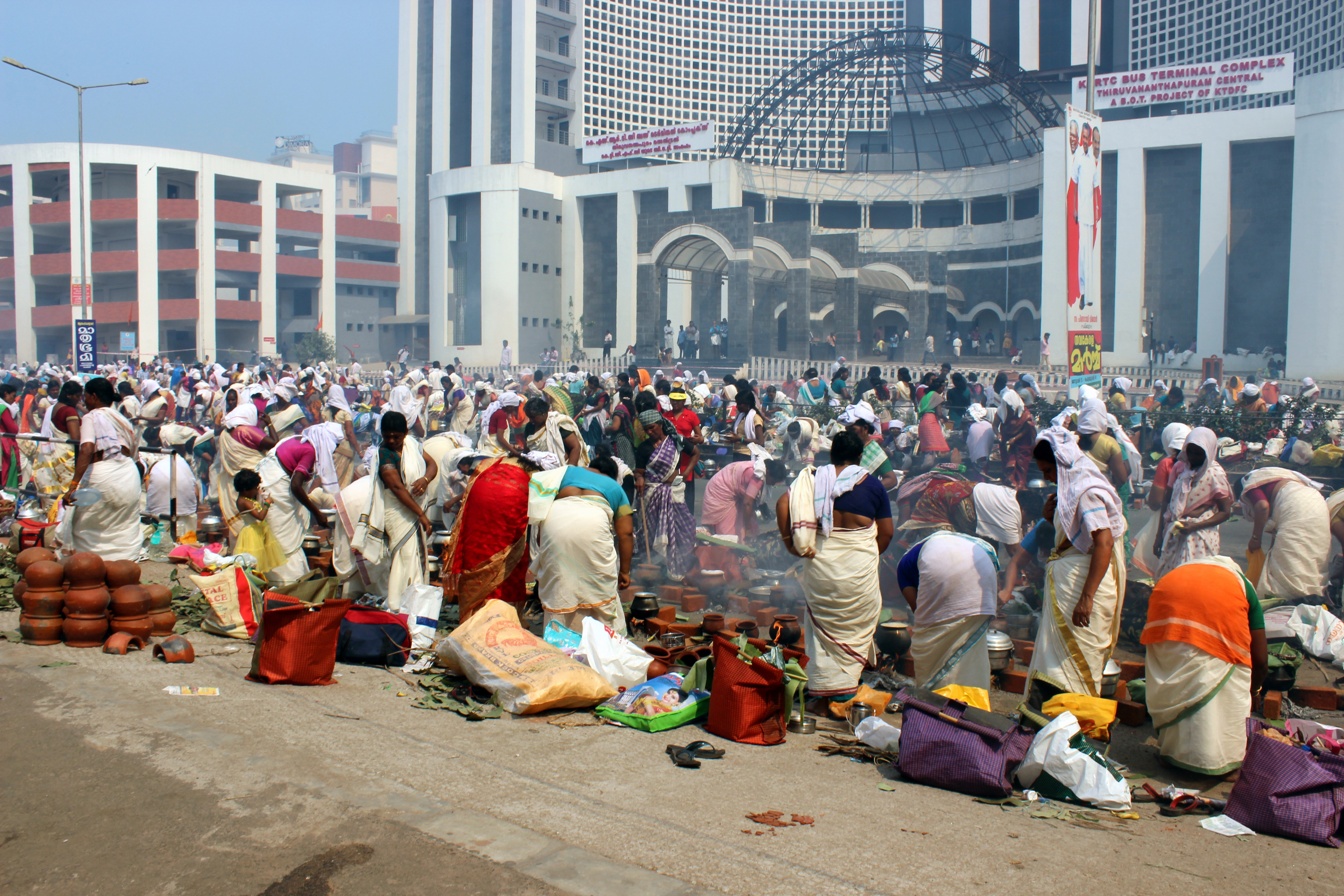
Attukal pongala

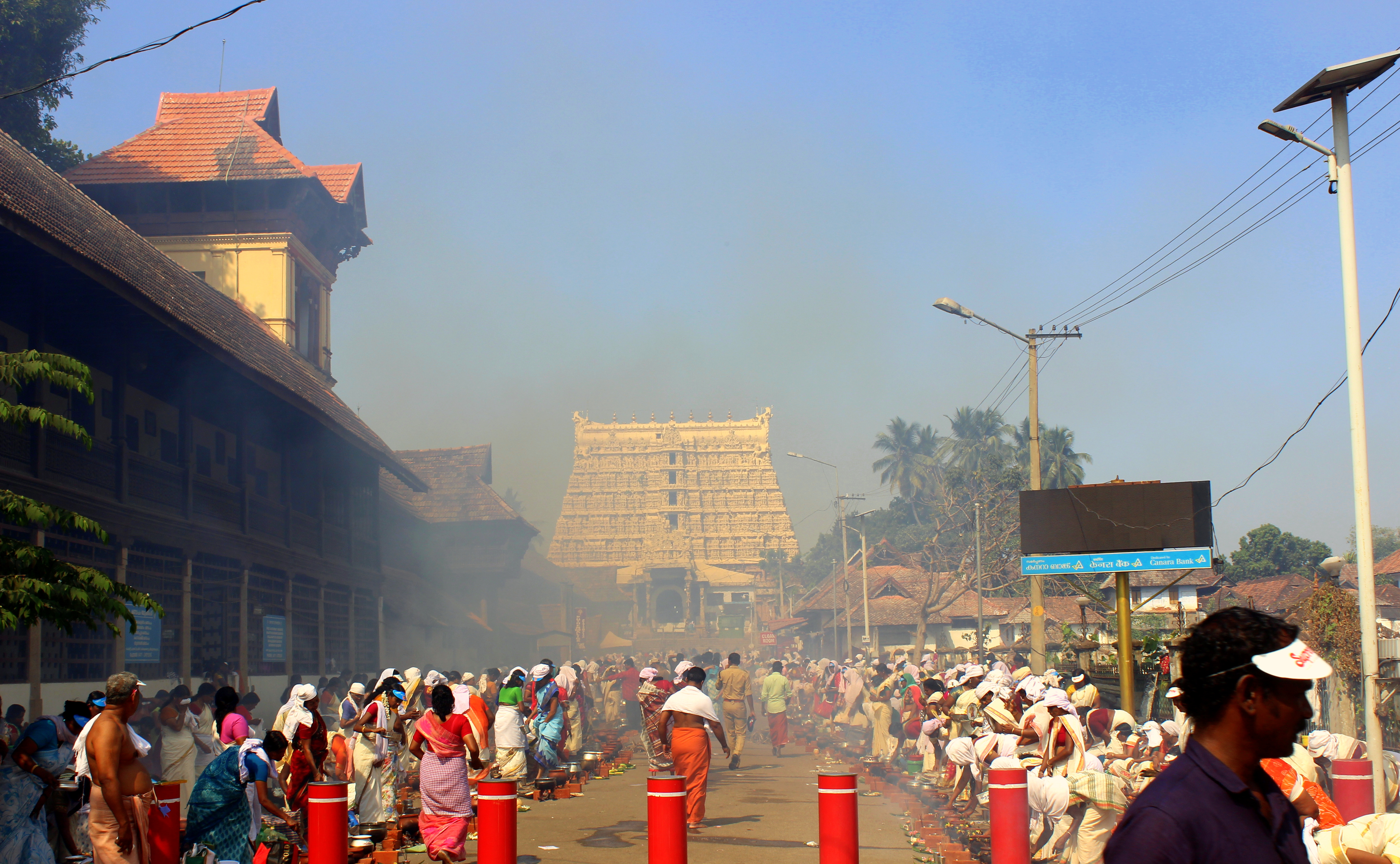
worship during attukal pongala at sree padmanabhaswamy temple

== See also ==
- Kannagi
- Vellayani Devi Temple
- List of Hindu temples in Kerala
- Temples of Kerala
