= East Fort =

Kizhakke Kotta East Fort
- Central Business District
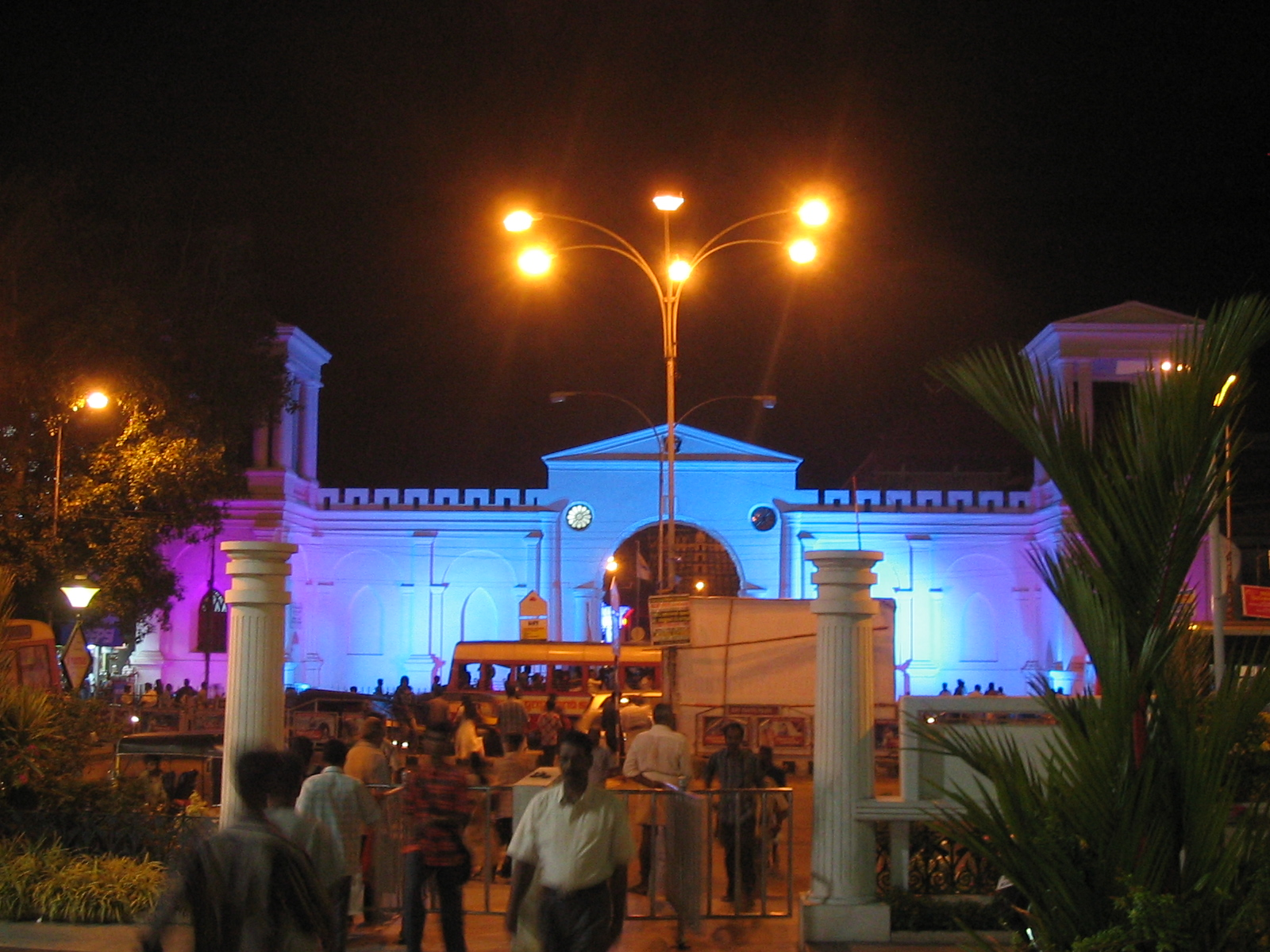
- Lit up, busy east fort
- Nickname: Kottaikkakam (inside the Fort)
- Location in Kerala, India
- Coordinates: 8°28′58″N 76°56′50″E
- Country: India
- State: Kerala
- District: Thiruvananthapuram

Languages
  - Official: Malayalam, English
- Time zone: UTC+5:30 (IST)
- PIN: 695036
- Telephone code: 0471
- Vehicle registration: KL- 01

Kizhakke Kotta, also known by its English name East Fort, is a busy commercial street located at the heart of the central business district of Thiruvananthapuram city in Kerala. Since Thiruvananthapuram was the capital of the kingdom of Travancore, East Fort has been a commercial centre. It also has the city's main bus stand, multiple theatres and the famous Padmanabha Swamy Temple.

== History ==
East Fort got its name from the eastern entrance to the fort built by the Kings of Travancore. The old city was all inside the fort on four sides with the Sri Padmanabha Swamy temple at the center. It is said that there were huge metal gates on this entrance to the Fort which was decorated with the symbol of a conch, which was the insignia of the Royal Family of Travancore.

== Significance ==
East Fort is today the heart of Thiruvananthapuram city. It is the central bus depot for the city bus services run by the state-run KSRTC. It is linked by MG Road to the rest of downtown Thiruvananthapuram, and is the point of diversion to other parts of the city, as well as to the famed Kovalam beach. The city's Central railway station, as well as the Central Bus Stand (for long distance buses) are both a few minutes walk from East Fort, as are most of Thiruvananthapuram's cinemas, as well as top cultural venues and shopping malls. Padmanabha Swamy Temple, from which the city takes its name (Thiru Anantha Puram means 'the city (puram) of Holy (Thiru) Anantha, another name for Vishnu, who is the deity of Padmanabha Swamy Temple), are situated inside the East fort entrance.

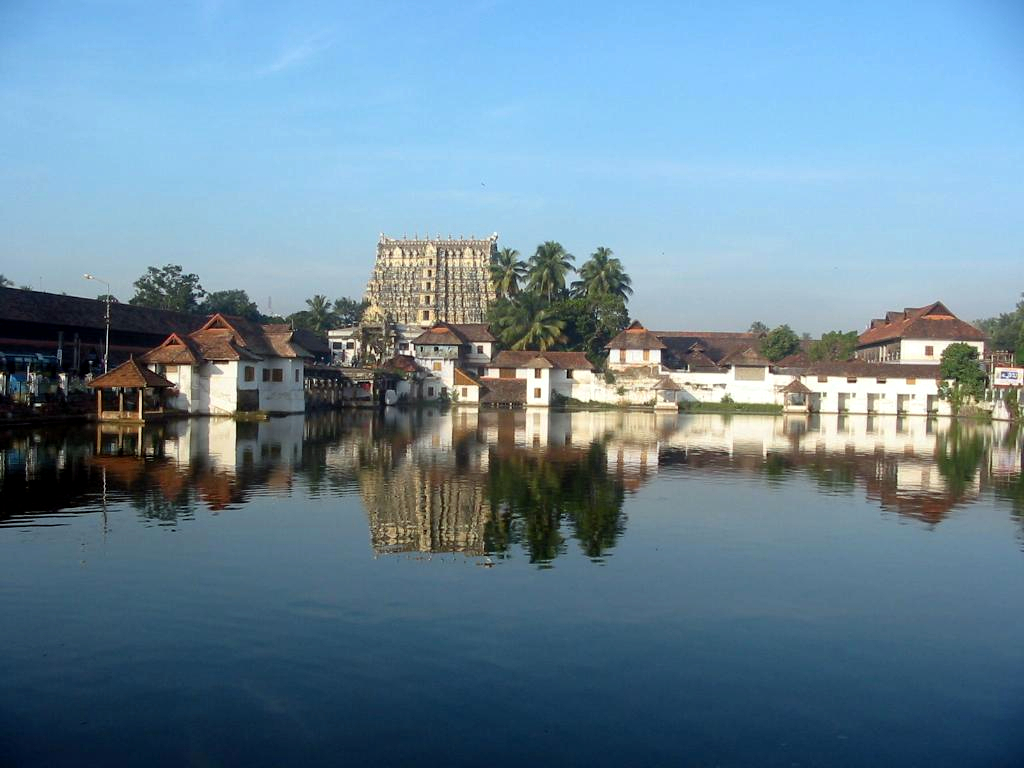
Sri Padmanabhaswamy Temple

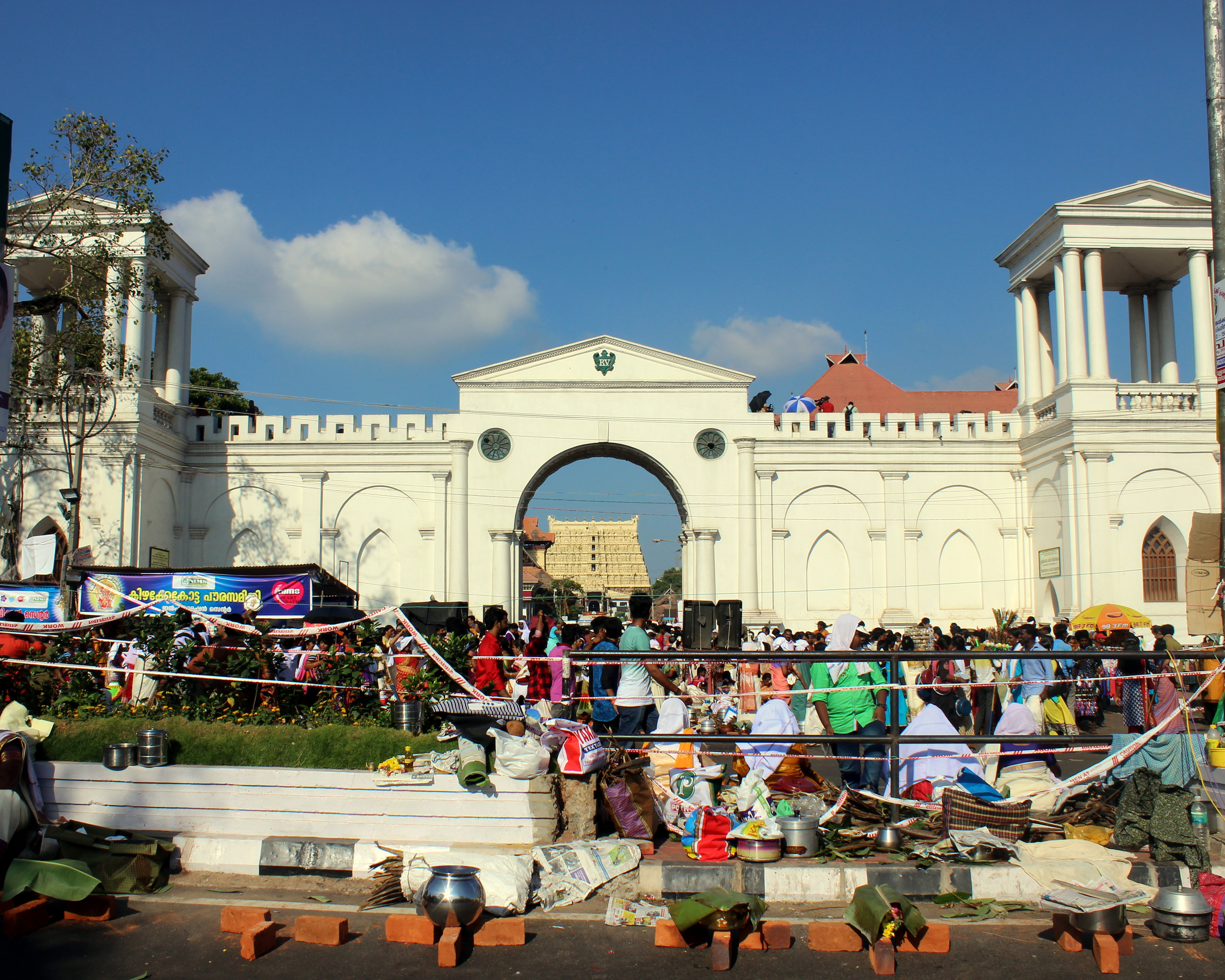
East Fort during Attukal Pongala festival

Another important landmark is the 125-year-old Attakulangara Government Central High School (situated near Gandhi park), which was established in the year 1889 by social activist Marthandan Thampi during the reign of Ayilyam Tirunal. This school is the alma mater of many famous persons who are scattered around the globe. On its list of former teachers are poet Ulloor S. Parameswara Iyer, former Chief Minister Pattom Thanu Pillai (chemistry), social reformer Sahodaran Ayyappan, former Chief Justice of erstwhile Travancore, U. Padmanabha Kukkiliya, Swami Vedachalam (Tamil), Marai Malai Adigal, and so on. Its alumni includes Subramanian, who secured first rank in the SSLC in 1971, and former Minister M. M. Hassan.

East Fort during the past few decades has transformed itself into one of the biggest commercial hubs of Thiruvananthapuram with many Jewellery and clothes brands like Alukkas, Alappat, Josco, Prince and Kalyan having their shops inside the fort premise. The 450 meters long street facing East Fort and Padmanabha Swamy temple is the most expensive stretch of land in Thiruvananthapuram with most of the land being owned by Rajadhani Group and Ramachandran Textiles group. There are temples devoted to Hanuman and Ganapathi inside the East Fort premises, along with an Ashram started by Shri Abhedananda. Government offices like Taluk office, District Co operative Bank and RTO office are also located here. There are many palaces within the fort premise like Kuthira Malika and Ranga Vilasom Palace (now a photo gallery). Other landmarks include the Pattom Thanu Pillai Park, Sanskrit school, Vasu Deva Vilasom Vaidyasala, Attukal Shopping Complex, Saj Lucia and Karimpanal Arcade.

Kuthiramalika Palace museum, built by His Highness Swathi Thirunal Rama Varma, Maharaja of erstwhile Travancore is also situated inside the Fort complex and its remains.

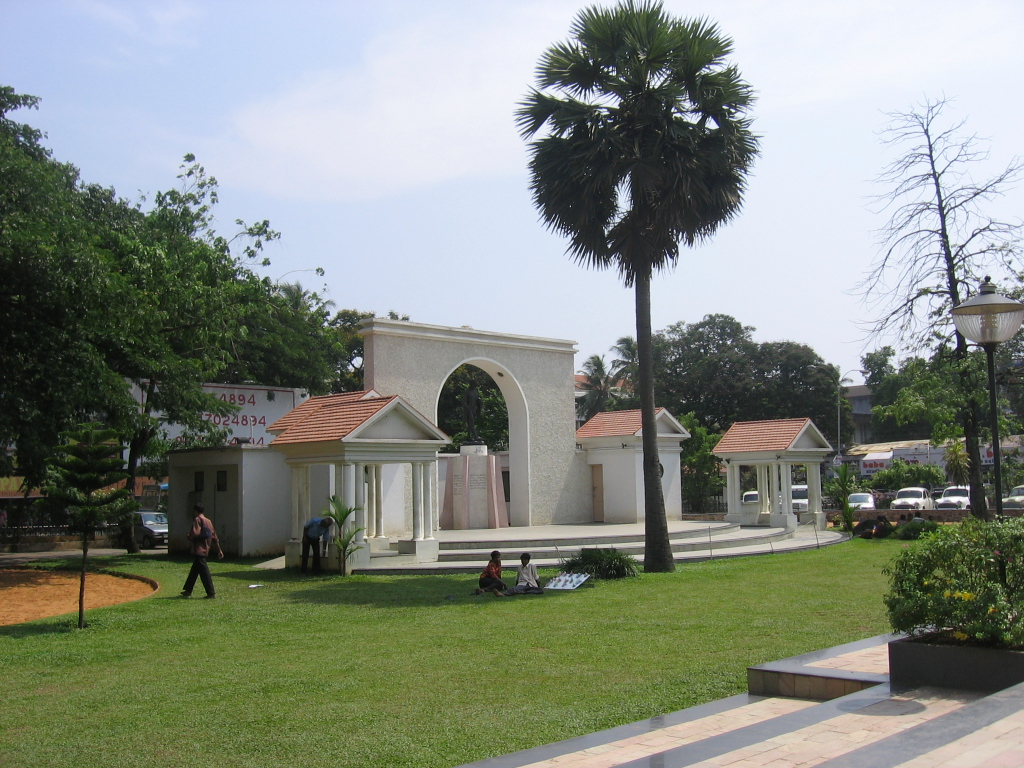
Gandhi Park

Gandhi Park is situated in front of the fort, which is famous for hosting social and political gatherings. The Park has been completely remodelled with modern urban landscaping, and provides a view of the entrance to the East Fort, which is lit up at night. The archeological department, cognizant of the great and long heritage of the East Fort, undertakes its maintenance and upkeep. It is a national monument and is flood lit in the evenings. The East Fort has its own Police Station and Post Office. Putharikandom Maithanam, another venue for political rallies and speeches, also lies opposite to East Fort and is alongside the KSRTC depot.

The Ganapathi temple, Pazhavangadi Ganapathi Temple, is also situated at the East Fort. It is from the East Fort that one enters the Chalai Market, which was the main wholesale business center of Travancore. Numerous cinemas like Padmanabha theater, Ajantha Theater, Sree bala (now closed), Kripa and Ariesplex SL Theater Complex are also close by.

== Road ==
Being in the Central Business District of Thiruvananthapuram, East Fort is connected to the MG Road connecting it to Palayam. It is connected to the Eanchakkal-Chalai Road connecting the Chackai Flyover and Airport.

== Railways ==
East fort is very close to Thycaud another commercial suburb which contains Thiruvananthapuram Central.

== Public Transport ==
East Fort has a large bus stop having buses from most parts of Thiruvananthapuram District and City. After Thiruvananthapuram Metro completion, East Fort will also get connected to Technocity, Trivandrum.

== Places of interest ==
- Sri Padmanabha Swami Temple and Padmatheerthakkulam - 200 m
- Pazhavangadi Ganapathi temple - 250 m
- Chalai bazaar - 100 m
- Kuthira Malika - 150 m
- Abhedananda Ashram - 200 m
