= 108 Shiva Temples =

Group of Shiva temples in Kerala

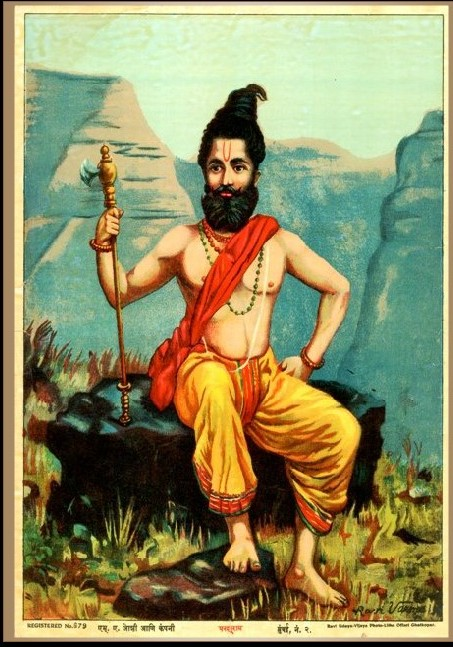
Parashurama with an axe

The 108 Shiva Temples are a group of Hindu temples dedicated to the god Shiva, enumerated in the Shivalaya Stotram, a Malayalam devotional hymn. Of the 108, 105 are in Kerala, 2 in Karnataka and 1 in Tamil Nadu.

== Background ==
According to Hindu beliefs, Parasurama created the land between Gokarna and Kanyakumari. It is said that Kerala was reclaimed from the ocean using his axe to donate the land to Brahmins after the killing of King Kartavirya Arjuna and other Kshatriyas. He split this land into 64 villages (gramas). Out of these 64 villages, 32 villages are between Perumpuzha and Gokarnam and the spoken language was Tulu. The remaining 32 villages were in the Malayalam-speaking area between Perumpuzha and Kanyakumari.

Parasurama is the sixth avatar of the god Vishnu; he was the youngest son of sage Jamadagni and Renuka. According to legend, after donating the land to Brahmins, 108 Shiva lingams and Durga idols were installed in these 64 villages. These 108 Shiva temples are mentioned in the Shivalaya Stotram, and a song is written in the Malayalam language. Of the 108 Shiva temples, 105 temples are in Kerala, 2 in Karnataka and 1 in the Kanyakumari district of Tamil Nadu.

== List of temples ==
No.	Temple Name	Deity	Festivals/Religious Practices	Location & Picture		
1	Vadakkunnathan Temple	Vadakunnathan (Shiva), Parvati; Rama, Sankara Narayana,	Sivarathri, Thiruvathira, Thrissur Pooram	10.5245°N 76.21451°E	Thrissur City, Thrissur district	
2	Udayamperoor Ekadasi Perumthrikovil Temple	Shiva	Shankaranarayana Vilakku, Sivarathri	9.92054°N 76.36085°E	Udayamperoor; Ernakulam District	
3	Raviswarapuram Siva Temple	Shiva	Sivarathri	10.22355°N 76.20072°E	Kodungalloor; Thrissur district	
4	Suchindram Sthanumalayan Temple	Shiva	Chariot Festival, Markazhi, Chithira, Sivarathri	8.15472°N 77.46528°E	Suchindram; Kanyakumari District	
5	Chowwara Chidambaraswamy Temple	Nataraja (Shiva)	Sivarathri	10.12618°N 76.38667°E	Chowwara; Ernakulam district	
6	Mathur Shiva Temple	Shiva, Parvati	Sivarathri	10.67471°N 76.11554°E	Pannithadam; Thrissur district	
7	Triprangode Siva Temple	Shiva	Sivarathri	10.85569°N 75.94784°E	Triprangode; Malappuram District	
8	Mundayur Mahadeva Temple	Shiva	Sivarathri	10.58937°N 76.15924°E	Anjur; Thrissur district	
9	Thirumandhamkunnu Temple	Shiva, Parvati, Bhadrakali	Thirumandhamkunnu Pooram	10.97991°N 76.20144°E	Angadipuram; Malappuram District	
10	Chowalloor Siva Temple	Shiva	Sivarathri	10.60589°N 76.07308°E	Guruvayoor; Thrissur District	
11	Pananchery Mudikkode Shiva Temple	Shiva	Sivarathri	10.55081°N 76.30727°E	Pananchery; Thrissur District	
12a	Annamanada Mahadeva Temple	Kirata Moorthy (Shiva)	Sivarathri	10.2347°N 76.33093°E	Annamanada; Thrissur district	
12b	Mannar Thrikkuratti Mahadeva Temple	Kirata Moorthy, Vishnu	Sivarathri	9.31993°N 76.5347°E	Mannar; Alleppey district	
13	Puramundekkadu Shri Mahadeva Temple	Shiva	Sivarathri	10.77936°N 76.02592°E	Edappal; Malappuram District	
14	Avanoor Sreekanteswaram Mahadeva Temple	Srikanda (Shiva)	Sivarathri	10.59893°N 76.21143°E	Avanur; Thrissur District	
15	Kollur Mookambika Temple	Adi Parashakti, Shiva	Navaratri	13.86384°N 74.81425°E	Kollur; Udupi district, Karnataka	
16	Thirumangalam Sree Maha Vishnu Siva Temple	Shiva; Vishnu	Sivarathri, Ashtamirohini	10.50511°N 76.06006°E	Engandiyoor; Thrissur District	
17	Thrikkariyoor Mahadeva Temple	Shiva	Sivarathri	10.08476°N 76.61266°E	Thrikkariyoor; Ernakulam District	
18	Kudappanakunnu Kunnathu Sri Mahadeva Temple	Shiva	Sivarathri	8.55576°N 76.9611°E	Kudappanakunnu; Thiruvananthapuram district	
19	Velloor Perunthatta Siva Temple	Shiva	Sivarathri	9.8188°N 76.46162°E	Velloor; Kottayam District	
20	Ashtamangalam Siva Temple	Ashtamurthi (Shiva)	Sivarathri	10.50884°N 76.18044°E	Ashtamangala; Thrissur District	
21	Iranikulam Sree Mahadeva Temple	Shiva as Thekkedathappan and Vadakkadathapapn	Sivarathri	10.20455°N 76.27688°E	Iranikulam, Mala; Thrissur District	
22	Kainoor Shiva Temple	Shiva	Sivarathri	10.50029°N 76.27799°E	Kainoor; Thrissur District	
23	Mahabaleshwar Temple, Gokarna	Mahabaleswar (Shiva)	Sivarathri, Rathothsava	14.54344°N 74.31546°E	Gokarna; Uttara Kannada District, Karnataka	
24	Ernakulam Shiva Temple	Rishinagakulathappan (Shiva)	Sivarathri, Painkuni Utsava	9.9689°N 76.28214°E	Ernakulam Town; Ernakulam district	
25	Pazhoor Perumthrikkovil	Perumthrikkovilappan	Sivarathri	9.88485°N 76.47255°E	Piravam; Ernakulam District	
26	Adat Shiva Temple	Shiva	Sivarathri	10.54428°N 76.13987°E	Adat; Thrissur District	
27	Parippu Mahadeva Temple	Shiva	Sivarathri, Utsav	9.6197°N 76.47706°E	Aymanam; Kottayam District	
28	Sasthamangalam Mahadevar Temple	Shiva	Sivarathri	8.51836°N 76.97344°E	Sasthamangalam; Thiruvananthapuram District	
29	Perumparampu Sri Mahadeva Temple	Shiva	Sivarathri	10.80311°N 75.99588°E	Edappal; Malappuram District	
30	Thrikkur Mahadeva Temple	Shiva	Sivarathri	10.46178°N 76.27085°E	Trikkur; Thrissur District	
31	Panayur Siva Temple	Shiva	Sivarathri	10.79276°N 76.31039°E	Thathamangalam; Palakkad District	
32	Tirunettur Mahadeva Temple	Shiva	Sivarathri, Vavubali	9.93019°N 76.31239°E	Nettoor; Ernakulam District	
33	Vaikom Mahadeva Temple	Vaikathappan, Parvathi	Vaikom Ashtami, Sivarathri, Utsav	9.74982°N 76.39641°E	Vaikom; Kottayam District	
34	Kollam Rameswaram Mahadeva Temple	Shiva	Sivarathri	8.89105°N 76.57092°E	Kollam; Kollam District	
35	Amaravila Rameswaram Sri Mahadeva Temple	Shiva	Sivarathri	8.39925°N 77.09466°E	Amaravila; Thiruvananthapuram District	
36	Ettumanoor Mahadevar Temple	Aghora (Shiva)	Sivarathri; Utsav	9.67365°N 76.56082°E	Ettumanoor; Kottayam District	
37	Kanjilassery Maha Siva Temple	Shiva	Sivarathri	11.4047°N 75.73499°E	Quilandy; Kozhikode District	
38	Chemmanthatta Mahadeva Temple	Shiva	Sivarathri	10.64998°N 76.11502°E	Chemmanthatta; Thrissur District	
39	Aluva Mahadeva Temple	Shiva	Aluva Sivarathri festival	10.11646°N 76.3546°E	Aluva; Ernakulam District	
40	Thirumittacode Temple	Shiva, Uyyavanda perumal	Sivarathri	10.78306°N 76.18435°E	Thirumittacode; Palakkad District	
41	Velorvattom Sri Mahadeva Temple	Vadakkanappan, Thekkanappan	Sivarathri	9.69493°N 76.32817°E	Velorvattom; Alappuzha District	
42	Muttichur Kallattupuzha Sri Maha Siva Temple	Shiva	Sivarathri	10.44312°N 76.10564°E	Anthikad; Thrissur District	
43	Thrikkunnathu Mahadeva Temple	Shiva	Sivarathri	Thrikkunnu	Kanjany; Thrissur District	
44	Cheruvathur Mahadeva Temple	Shiva	Sivarathri	10.66169°N 76.07094°E	Kunnamkulam; Thrissur District	
45	Poonkunnam Siva Temple	Shiva	Sivarathri	10.53453°N 76.20273°E	Poonkunnam; Thrissur District	
46	Niranam Thrikkapaleeswaram Dakshinamurthy Temple	Dakshinamurthy	Sivarathri	9.348°N 76.52875°E	Niranam; Pathanamthitta District	
47	Kadachira Sri Thrikkapalam Siva Temple	Dakshinamurthy (Two Deities)	Sivarathri	11.83409°N 75.45948°E	Kadachira; Peralassery; Kannur District	
48	Nadapuram Iringannur Siva Temple	Dakshinamurthy	Sivarathri	11.69501°N 75.64893°E	Nadapuram; Kozhikkode District	
49	Avittathur Mahadeva Temple	Shiva	Sivarathri	10.33496°N 76.24534°E	Avittathur; Thrissur District	
50	Parumala Valiya Panayannarkavu Devi Temple	Shiva, Mahakali	Sivarathri; Navarathri	9.37888°N 76.36916°E	Mannar, Alappuzha; Alleppey District	
51	Anandavalleeshwaram Sri Mahadevar Temple	Shiva, Anandavalli	Sivarathri	8.89342°N 76.5726°E	Kollam; Kollam District	
52	Kattakampal Temple	Shiva, Bhagavathy	Pooram	10.68956°N 76.03737°E	Kattakampal; Thrissur District	
53	Kondazhy Tritham Tali Siva Temple	Shiva, Parvathi	Sivarathri	10.7152°N 76.40382°E	Kondazhy; Thrissur District	
54	Perakam Mahadeva Temple	Shiva	Sivarathri	10.60091°N 76.02366°E	chavakkad Thrissur District	
55	Chakkamkulangara Siva Temple	Shiva, Parvathi	Sivarathri	9.949°N 76.34598°E	Thrippunithura; Eranakulam District	
56	Veeranimangalam Mahadeva Temple	Shiva, Narasimha	Sivarathri	10.65542°N 76.25683°E	Wadakkancherry; Thrissur District	
57	Cheranalloor Mahadeva Temple	Shiva	Sivarathri	10.17849°N 76.47169°E	Kalady; Ernakulam District	
58	Maniyoor Mahadeva Temple	Shiva	Sivarathri	11.9476°N 75.45228°E	Mankada; Malappuram district	
59	Kozhikode Tali Temple	Shiva	Sivarathri	11.2477°N 75.78719°E	Kozhikode; Kozhikode District	
60	Kaduthruthy Mahadeva Temple	Shiva	Sivarathri	9.76527°N 76.49484°E	Kaduthuruthy; Kottayam District	
61	Keezhtali Mahadeva Temple	Shiva	Sivarathri	10.20807°N 76.20262°E	Kodungalloor; Thrissur District	
62	Talikotta Mahadeva Temple	Shiva	Sivarathri	9.59636°N 76.50653°E	Kottayam; Kottayam District	
63	Kodungallur Bhagavathy Temple	Shiva, Kodungallooramma	Kodungallur Bharani	10.22712°N 76.19869°E	Kodungallur; Thrissur District	
64	Sreekanteswaram Mahadeva Temple	Sreekandan	Sivarathri	8.48699°N 76.94294°E	Sreekanteswaram; Thiruvananthapuram District	
65	Thiruvanchikulam Temple	Thiruvanchikulathappan	Sivarathri	10.21002°N 76.20622°E	Thiruvanchikulam; Thrissur District	
66	Padanayarkulangara Mahadeva Temple	Shiva	Sivarathri	9.05563°N 76.53617°E	Karunagappally Town; Kollam District	
67	Thrichattukulam Mahadeva Temple	Vaduthaleswan	Sivarathri	9.83306°N 76.3317°E	Panavally; Alleppey District	
68	Pokkunny Siva Temple	Pokkunniyappan	Sivarathri	10.64884°N 76.70339°E	Pokkunny; Palakkad District	
69	Kottiyoor Siva Temple	Kottiyurappan	Kottiyoor Vysakha Mahotsavam	11.87533°N 75.86405°E	Kottiyoor; Kannur District	
70	Thrippalur Mahadeva Temple	Thrippaloorappan, Narasimha, Krishna	Sivarathri, Ashtami Rohini	10.64372°N 76.5682°E	Alathur; Palakkad District	
71	Sree Perunthatta Siva Temple	Shiva	Sivarathri	10.58601°N 76.03861°E	Guruvayoor; Thrissur District	
72	Trithala Maha Siva Temple	Shiva	Sivarathri	10.8052°N 76.13258°E	Thrithala; Palakkad District	
73	Thiruvatta Mahadeva Temple	Shiva	Sivarathri	9.37452°N 76.56729°E	Thiruvalla; Pathanamthitta District	
74	Vazhappally Maha Siva Temple	ThiruVazhappallilappan, Vazhappally Bhagavathi, Ganapathy	Panguni Utsav, Sivarathri, Mudiyeduppu, Vinayaka Chathurthi	9.45625°N 76.5263°E	Changanassery; Kottayam District	
75	Changankulangara Mahadeva Temple	Shiva	Sivarathri	9.1091°N 76.52154°E	Changankulangara; Kollam District	
76	Anjumoorthy Temple	Mahadevan, Mahasudarshanam (Swayambhu), Mahavishnu	Sivarathri, Vidyarambham, Vishu	Anjumoorthy (10.61781°N 76.50237°E)	Vadakkencherry; Palakkad District	
77	Thirunakkara Sree Mahadevar Temple	Thirunakkara Tevar	Sivarathri, Pakal Pooram	9.59038°N 76.51857°E	Thirunakkara; Kottayam District	
78	Kodumbu Mahadeva Temple	Shiva	Sivarathri	10.74194°N 76.69555°E	Chittur; Palakkad District	
79	Ashtamichira Mahadeva Temple	Thekkum Tevar, Vadakkum Tevar	Sivarathri	10.27417°N 76.2785°E	Ashtamichira; Thrissur District	
80	Pattanakkad Mahadeva Temple	Shiva	Sivarathri	9.73072°N 76.31832°E	Pattanakkad; Alleppey District	
81	Uliyannoor Mahadeva Temple	Shiva	Sivarathri	10.09887°N 76.34198°E	Uliyannoor; Ernakulam District	
82	Killikkurussi Mahadeva Temple	Dakshinamurthy	Sivarathri	10.76534°N 76.43651°E	Killikkurussimangalam; Palakkad district	
83	Puthur Mahadeva Temple	Puthurappan	Sivarathri	12.20721°N 75.22577°E	Karivellur; Kannur District	
84	Chengannur Mahadeva Temple	Chengannurappan, Chenganoor Bhagavathi	Sivarathri	9.32425°N 76.61144°E	Chengannur; Alleppey District	
85	Someswaram Mahadeva Temple	Someswar	Sivarathri	10.74832°N 76.43778°E	Pampady; Thrissur District	
86	Venganellore Thiruvimbilappan Temple	ThiruVimbilappan	Sivarathri	10.70311°N 76.33668°E	Chelakkara; Thrissur District	
87	Kottarakkara Mahadeva Temple	Ilayidathappan	Sivarathri	9.00063°N 76.76801°E	Kottarakkara; Kollam District	
88	Kandiyoor Sree Mahadeva Temple	Kandiyurappan	Sivarathri	9.25319°N 76.53057°E	Mavelikkara; Alleppey District	
89	Palayoor Mahadeva Temple	Shiva	-	10.58256°N 76.03233°E	Palayoor; Kodungalloor; Thrissur District	converted to church during European rule
90	Taliparamba Rajarajeshwara Temple	Raja Rajeswaran	Sivarathri	12.04837°N 75.35638°E	Taliparamba; Kannur District	
91	Nedumpura Kulasekharanellur Shiva Temple	Kulasekharathappan	Sivarathri	10.73465°N 76.2614°E	Cheruthuruthi thrissur District	
92	Sree Mannoor Siva Temple	Shiva	Sivarathri	11.15354°N 75.83277°E	Kadalundi; Kozhikode District	
93	Thrissilery Shiva Temple	Aghora Murthi	Sivarathri	11.85154°N 76.01653°E	Thirunelli; Wayanad District	
94	Sringapuram Mahadeva Temple	Dakshayani Vallabhan	Sivarathri	10.21803°N 76.20101°E	Kodungalloor; Thrissur District	
95	Karivellur Mahadeva Temple	Shiva	Sivarathri	12.17298°N 75.19025°E	Karivellur; Kannur District	
96	Mammiyoor Mahadeva Temple	Mammiyurappan	Sivarathri	10.59907°N 76.03615°E	Guruvayoor; Thrissur District	
97	Parampanthali Sree Mahadeva Temple	Taliswaran, Shiva	Sivarathri	10.54036°N 76.0905°E	Mullassery; Thrissur District	
98	Thirunavaya Mahadeva Temple	Shiva	Sivarathri	10.85577°N 75.98088°E	Thirunavaya; Malappuram district	Exact location unknown, likely ruins at Nilapadu Thara In Thirunavaya.
99	Kanjiramattam Sree Mahadeva Temple	Shiva	Sivarathri	9.88685°N 76.71987°E	Thodupuzha; Idukki District	
100	Nalpathaneeswaram Sree Mahadeva Temple	Nalpathenniswaran	Sivarathri	9.81581°N 76.34214°E	Panavally; Alleppey District	
101	Kottappuram Siva Temple	Shiva	Sivarathri	10.5259°N 76.20572°E	Kottappuram; Thrissur District	
102	Muthuvara Mahadeva Temple	Shiva	Sivarathri	10.55256°N 76.17502°E	Muthuvara; Thrissur District	
103	Velappaya Mahadeva Temple	Vadakkum Tevar, Thekkum Tevar	Sivarathri	10.60232°N 76.1943°E	Velappaya; Thrissur District	
104	Chendamangalam Kunnathali Temple	Shiva	Sivarathri	10.17253°N 76.23252°E	Chendamangalam; Ernakulam District	
105	Thrikkandiyur Mahadeva Temple	Thrikkandiyurappan	Sivarathri	10.90545°N 75.92386°E	Tirur; Malappuram District	
106	Peruvanam Mahadeva Temple	Erattayappan, Madathilappan	Peruvanam Pooram, Sivarathri	10.43732°N 76.21188°E	Cherpu; Thrissur District	
107	Thiruvaloor Mahadeva temple	Thiruvalurappan	Sivarathri	10.11871°N 76.30877°E	Alangad; Eranakulam District	
108	Chirakkal Mahadeva Temple	Shiva	Sivarathri	10.20102°N 76.35396°E	Angamali; Ernakulam District	

== See also ==
- Jyotirlinga
- Pancha Bhoota Stalam
- Hindu temples in Kerala
