= Thirumangalam Sree Maha Vishnu Siva Temple =

Hindu temple in Thrissur district, Kerala, India

Thirumangalam Sree Maha Deva Temple
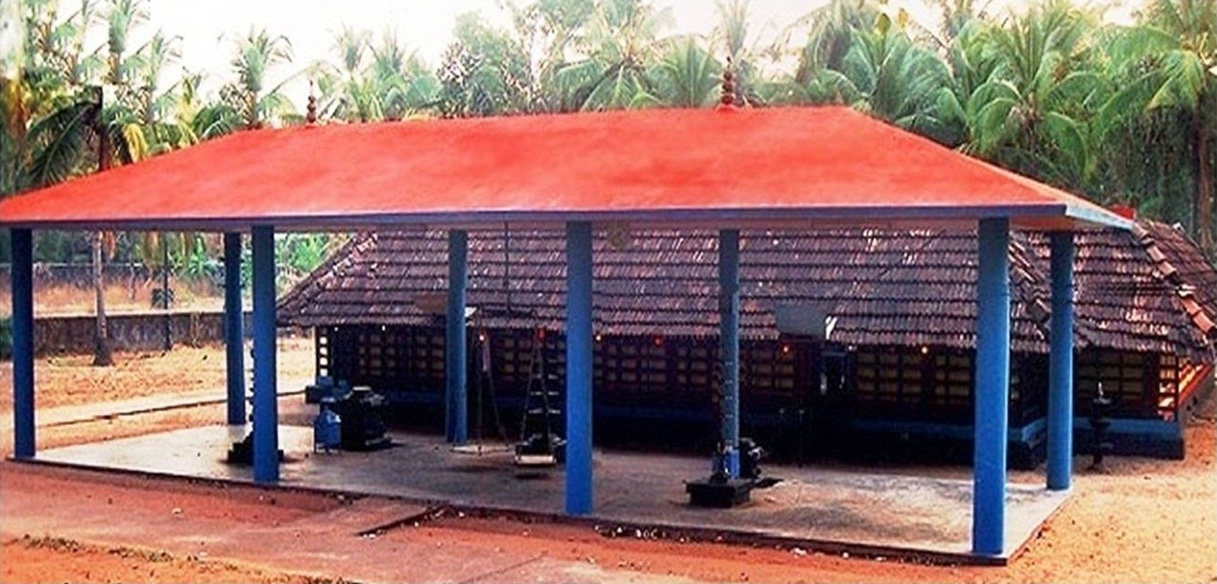
- Nalambalam

- Thirumangalam Sree Maha Deva Temple, Engandiyoor, Thrissur, Kerala

Religion
- Affiliation: Hinduism
- District: Thrissur
- Deity: Vishnu, Shiva
- Festivals: Ashtami Rohini, Maha Shivaratri

Location
- Location: Thirumangalam, Engandiyur Ooralan - Kattumadam Mana
- State: Kerala
- Country: India
- Interactive map of Thirumangalam Sree Maha Deva Temple
- Coordinates: 10°30′19″N 76°03′31″E

Architecture
- Type: Kerala style
- Completed: Not known

Specifications
- Temple: Two
- Monument: 2
- Elevation: 24.02 m (79 ft)

Thirumangalam Sree Maha Deva Siva Temple is an ancient Hindu temple dedicated to Vishnu and Shiva at Engandiyur of Thrissur District in Kerala state in India. Governed by Kattumadam Devaswam Trust. The presiding deity of the temple are Maha Vishnu and Shiva, located in separate sanctum sanatoriums, facing East. According to folklore, Shiva Linga is swayambhu and sage Parashurama has installed the idol. The temple is a part of the 108 famous Shiva temples in Kerala.

== See also ==
- 108 Shiva Temples
- Temples of Kerala
- Hindu temples in Thrissur Rural
- Temple Website
