= Velloor Perunthatta Siva Temple =

Hindu temple in India

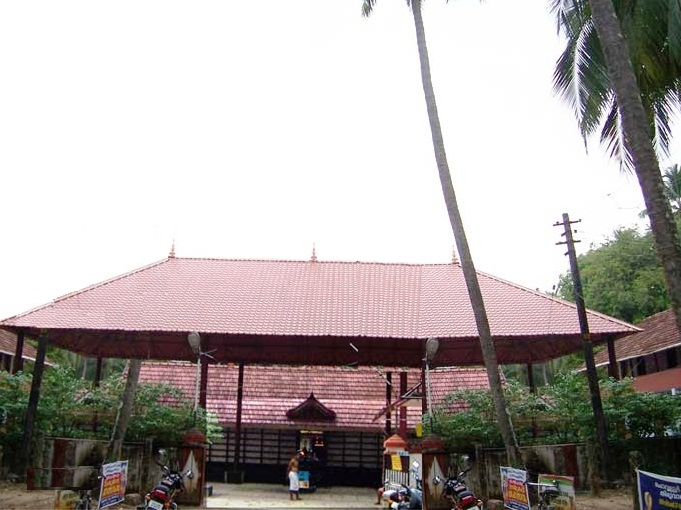
- Main Entrance

- Perunthatta Siva Temple, Velloor, Kottayam, Kerala

Religion
- Affiliation: Hinduism
- District: Kottayam
- Deity: Shiva
- Festival: Maha Shivaratri

Location
- Location: Velloor, Thalayolaparambu
- State: Kerala
- Country: India
- Interactive map of Velloor Perunthatta Siva Temple
- Coordinates: 9°49′07.7″N 76°27′41.9″E

Architecture
- Type: Kerala style
- Completed: Not known

Specifications
- Temple: One
- Monument: 1
- Elevation: 74.13 m (243 ft)

Velloor Perunthatta Siva Temple is located at Velloor, near to Thalayolaparambu in Kottayam district. The presiding deity of the temple is Shiva, located in separate sanctum sanatorum, facing east. It is believed that this temple is one of the 108 Shiva temples of Kerala and is installed by sage Parasurama dedicated to Shiva. It is one of the oldest Shiva temples in Kottayam District.

== See also ==
- 108 Shiva Temples
- Temples of Kerala
