= Maniyoor Mahadeva Temple =

Temple in Maniyur, Kerala, India

Maniyoor Mahadeva Temple is located at Vatakara-Maniyur Road, Ambalamukku, Palayad, Maniyur, Kozhikode district, Kerala. The presiding deity of the temple is Shiva. The main deity is of Rudrakshasila. It is giving darshan towards west. It is believed that this temple is one of the 108 Shiva temples of Kerala and is installed by sage Parasurama dedicated to Shiva.

== Location ==
The temple can be reached by getting down at Thiroor railway station, taking a bus through Malappuram-Manjiri, and getting down at Anakkayam. Then after Catching a bus to Perinthalmanna, one can get down at Mankada and go to the temple.

== See also ==
- 108 Shiva Temples
- Temples of Kerala
