= Panayur Palur Shiva Temple =

Hindu temple in India

Panayur Paloor Shiva Temple
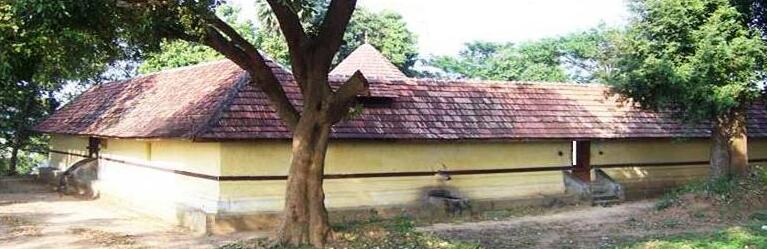
- Temple Nalambalam

Religion
- Affiliation: Hinduism
- District: Palakkad
- Deity: Shiva
- Festival: Maha Shivaratri

Location
- Location: Vaniyamkulam
- State: Kerala
- Country: India
- Interactive map of Panayur Paloor Shiva Temple
- Coordinates: 10.792772989254688°N 76.31045052461384°E

Architecture
- Type: Kerala style
- Completed: Not known
- Monument: 1

Panayur Shiva Temple is located at Vaniyamkulam village in Palakkad district, in Kerala, India. The presiding deity of the temple is Shiva, located in main Sanctum Sanctorum, facing East. According to folklore, sage Parashurama has installed the idol. It is the part of the 108 Shiva Temples of Kerala. The temple is located around 4 km away from Vaniyamkulam village on the route of Vaniyamkulam - Vallappuzha Road. The main sanctum santorium is in square shape in kukkudakruthi styled.

== See also ==
- 108 Shiva Temples
- Temples of Kerala
