= Mundayur Mahadeva Temple =

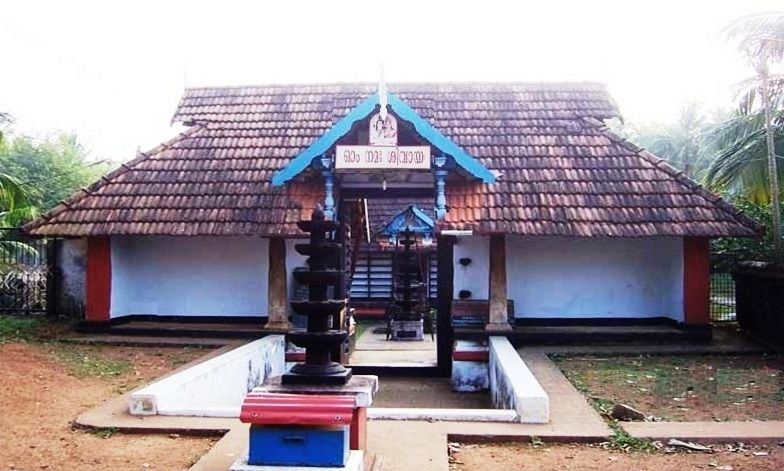
- Temple entrance

- Location in Kerala

Religion
- Affiliation: Hinduism
- District: Thrissur District
- Deity: Shiva
- Festival: Maha Shivaratri

Location
- Location: Anjur
- State: Kerala
- Country: India
- Coordinates: 10.589277°N 76.160183°E

Architecture
- Type: (Kerala style)
- Completed: Not known (believed to be thousands of years old)

Specifications
- Temple: One
- Monument: 1
- Elevation: 28.93 m (95 ft)

Mundayur Mahadeva Temple (Malayalam: മുണ്ടയൂർ മഹാദേവർ ക്ഷേത്രം) is an ancient Hindu temple dedicated to Shiva at Anjur of Thrissur District in Kerala state in India. The temple is situated near to SH-69 (Thrissur - Kuttippuram road) at Mundayur village. The presiding deity of the temple is Shiva, located in main Sanctum Sanctorum, facing East. According to folklore, sage Parashurama has installed the idol of Lord Shiva. It is the part of the 108 Shiva Temples of Kerala. Kozhikode Zamorin's army meditated on the Lord Shiva of Mundayur Temple and went out to battle. It was because such a practice was presumed that Lord Shiva of Mundayur saved them.

== Festival ==
The annual festival of Mundayur Mahadeva Temple is celebrates for Laksharchana in the month of March–April (Malayalam month: Meenam). Sivarathri festival is the other important one celebrated by the temple every year in the month of Feb-March (Malayalam month: Kumbhham).

== See also ==
- 108 Shiva Temples
- Temples of Kerala
- Hindu temples in Thrissur Rural
