= Puramundekkadu Shri Mahadeva Temple =

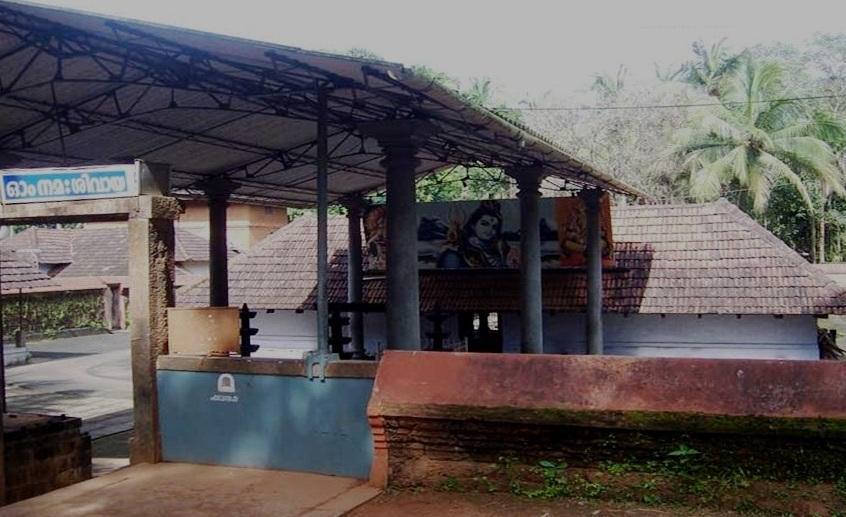
- Temple Entrance

Religion
- Affiliation: Hinduism
- District: Malappuram District
- Deity: Shiva
- Festival: Maha Shivaratri

Location
- Location: Vattamkulam, Edappal
- State: Kerala
- Country: India
- Interactive map of Puramundekkadu Shri Mahadeva Temple
- Coordinates: 10.779164°N 76.0261631°E

Architecture
- Type: Kerala style
- Completed: Not known
- Monument: 1

Puramundekkadu Shri Mahadeva Temple is an ancient Hindu temple dedicated to Shiva is situated at Edappal of Malappuram District in Kerala state in India. The presiding deity of the temple is Shiva, located in main Sanctum Sanctorum, facing East. According to folklore, sage Parashurama has installed the idol. The temple is a part of the 108 famous Shiva temples in Kerala and one among the five Shiva temples around Guruvayoor.

== See also ==
- 108 Shiva Temples
- Temples of Kerala
