= Udayamperoor Ekadasi Perumthrikovil Temple =

Hindu temple in India

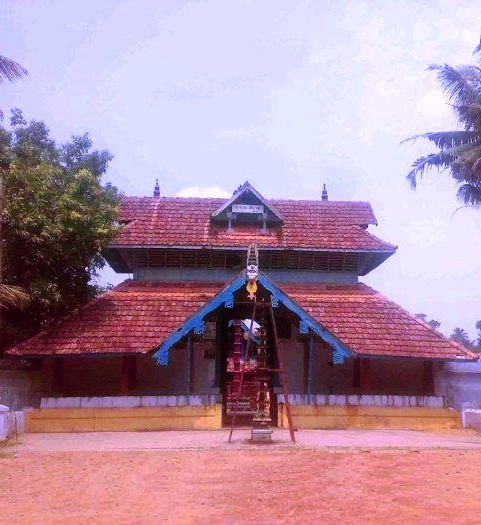
- East Entrance of Perumthrikovil Temple

Religion
- Affiliation: Hinduism
- District: Ernakulam District
- Deity: Shiva
- Festival: Maha Shivaratri

Location
- Location: Udayamperoor
- State: Kerala
- Country: India
- Interactive map of Udayamperoor Ekadasi Perumthrikovil Temple
- Coordinates: 9.9203619°N 76.3612045°E

Architecture
- Type: (Kerala style)
- Creator: N
- Completed: Twelfth Century
- Monument: 1

Udayamperoor Ekadasi Perumthrikovil Temple is an ancient Hindu temple dedicated to Shiva at Udayamperoor of Ernakulam District in Kerala state in India. This temple is a classic example of the architectural style of Kerala and has monumental towers and Round Sanctum Sanctorum. One of the big Siva temples in Kerala, the Udayamperoor Temple has a courtyard of about four acres of land. The Mukha Mandapa - the first chamber is built in shaped kerala-dravidian architecture. According to folklore, sage Parashurama has installed the idol. The temple is a part of the 108 famous Shiva temples in Kerala. The sanctum is dedicated to Shiva, with space for a Parvati shrine facing west. Perumthrikkovil is associated with three early inscriptions of the 12th and 13th century. Two of them got damaged and the third inscription on the adhishtana of the Namaskaramandapa is well preserved.

== See also ==
- 108 Shiva Temples
- Temples of Kerala
