= Thrippalur Mahadeva Temple =

Hindu temple in Kerala, India

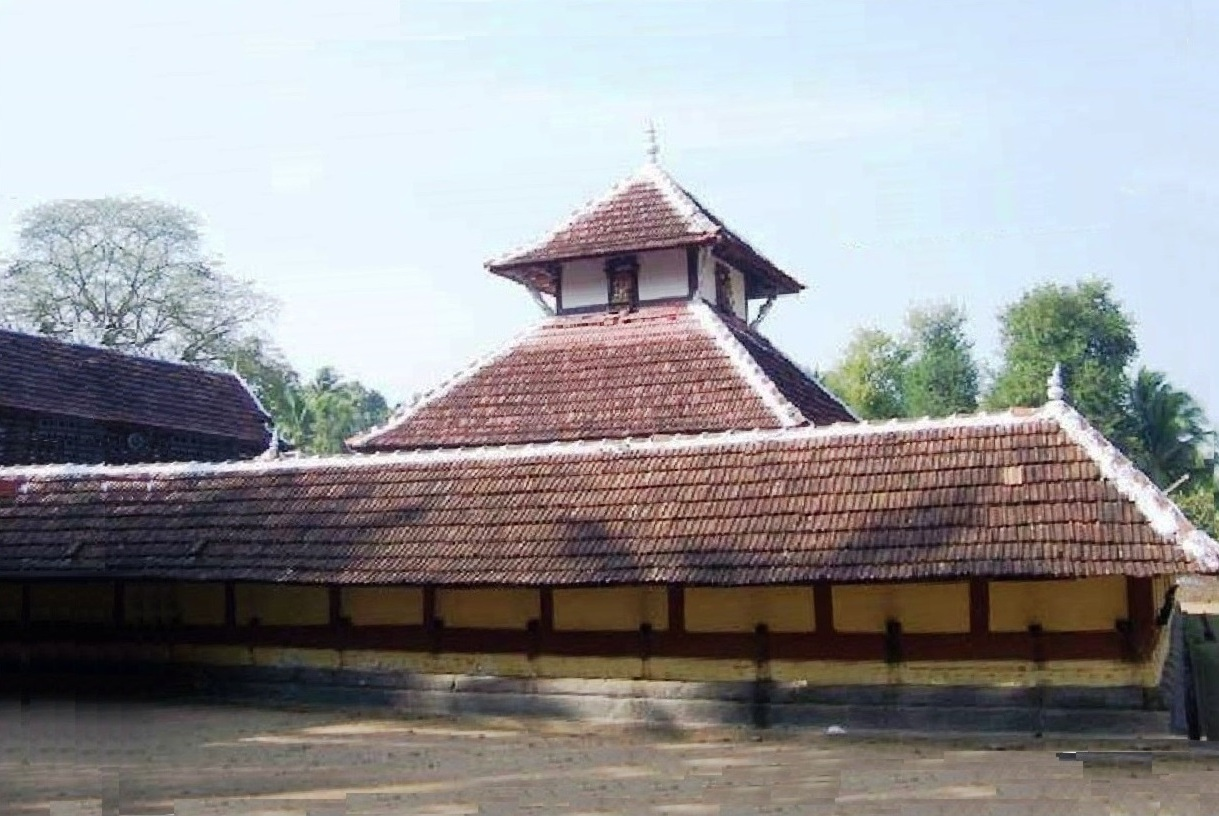
- Main Temple Structure

- Location in Kerala

Religion
- Affiliation: Hinduism
- District: Palakkad
- Deity: Shiva, Krishna, Narasimha
- Festivals: Maha Shivaratri, Deepavali, Ashtami Rohini

Location
- Location: Alathur
- State: Kerala
- Country: India
- Interactive map of Thrippalur Mahadeva Temple
- Coordinates: 10.643671°N 76.567783°E

Architecture
- Type: Kerala style

Specifications
- Temple: Three
- Monument: 1
- Elevation: 83 m (272 ft)

Thrippalur Mahadeva Temple is an ancient Hindu temple dedicated to Lord Shiva, Krishna and Narasimha is situated on the banks of the Gayatri river at Alathur of Palakkad District in Kerala state in India. References to this temple are found in many of the classics of Malayalam Literature. According to folklore, sage Parashurama has installed the idol of Lord Shiva in the Treta Yuga. The temple is a part of the 108 famous Shiva temples in Kerala. The temple is dedicated to Lord Narasimha and Lord Krishna in addition to Lord Shiva. Therefore, the Saiva-Vaishnava glow is a holy abode.

== History ==
Though the history of the temple is difficult to trace, it was once under the control of the Kavalappara Swarupam of Palakkad Kings.

== Temple Architecture ==
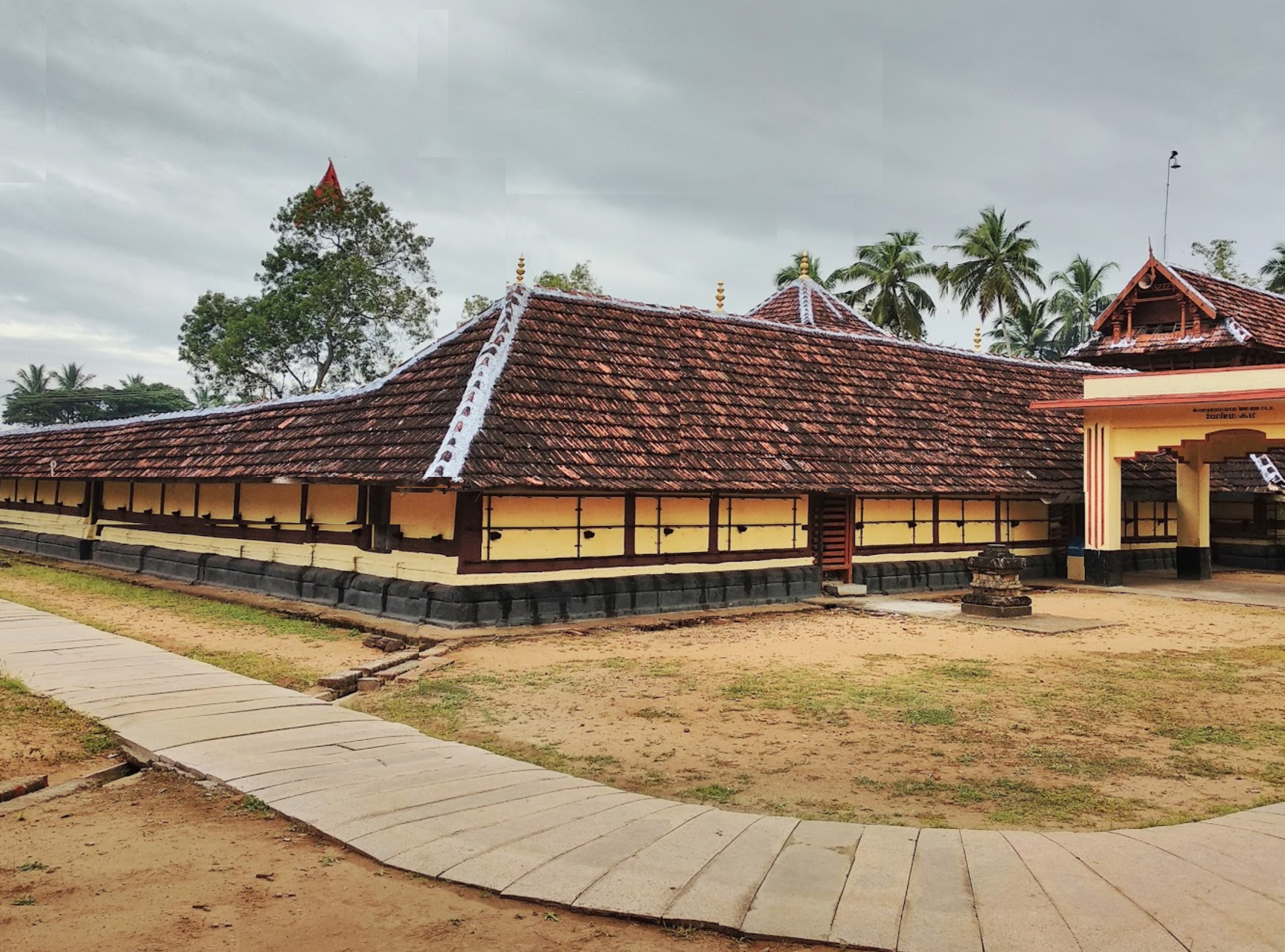
Temple Complex

The temple complex having three main sreekovil for Lord Shiva, Lord Krishna and Lord Narasimha. The two-storey intricate carvings on the shrine of Lord Shiva reflect its antiquity. The Sanctum Sanctorum of Lord Shiva and Lord Krishna are in square shape. The shrine of Lord Krishna has two storeys and the Narasimha is circular (rounda-sanctum). All the three idol of the goddesses facing west. The interior of the temple is covered with polished granite stones. The well-packed small space gives its atmosphere an antique feel. On the east side of the temple, there is a kind of old paintings on the wall that appear to have been built by a devotee of Trippalur Shiva on closer inspection. It believe that these painting are a century old. Those who did this seem to have done a good deal of research on the temple and its legends. The temple has a large pond outside the western temple gate. It is believed that the temple was built to calm the power of Lord Shiva.

== Temple Festival ==
Deepavali Vavu is the main festival of Thrippalur Mahadeva temple.

== Sub Deities ==
- Ganapathy
- Subrahmanya
