= Raviswarapuram Siva Temple =

Hindu temple in India

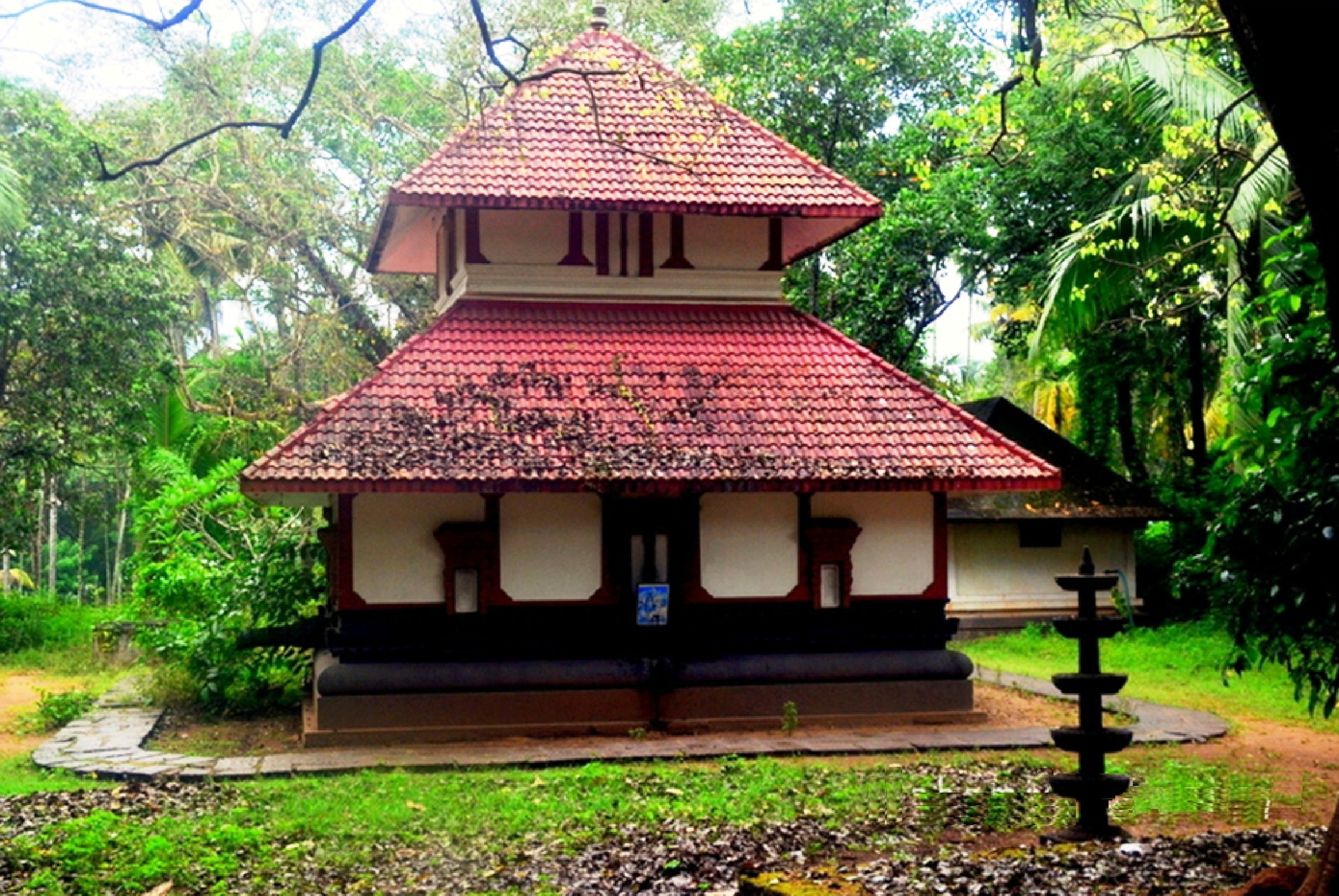
- Sanctum Sanctorum

Religion
- Affiliation: Hinduism
- District: Thrissur District
- Deity: Shiva
- Festival: Maha Shivaratri

Location
- Location: Kodungalloor
- State: Kerala
- Country: India
- Interactive map of Raviswarapuram Siva Temple
- Coordinates: 10°13′25″N 76°12′03″E

Architecture
- Type: (Kerala style)
- Creator: Unknown
- Completed: Not known
- Monument: 1

Raviswarapuram Siva Temple is an ancient Hindu temple dedicated to the god Shiva at Kodungalloor of Thrissur District in Kerala state in India. The presiding deity of the temple is Shiva in Raviswara form, located in main Sanctum Sanctorum, facing East. The existence of temple was mentioned in Sangam Literature as one of the major temples under Chera Dynasty. According to folklore, sage Parashurama has installed the idol. It is the part of the 108 Shiva temples of Kerala.

== See also ==
- 108 Shiva Temples
- Temples of Kerala
- Hindu temples in Thrissur Rural
