= Muttichur Kallattupuzha Sri Maha Siva Temple =

Hindu temple in Kerala, India

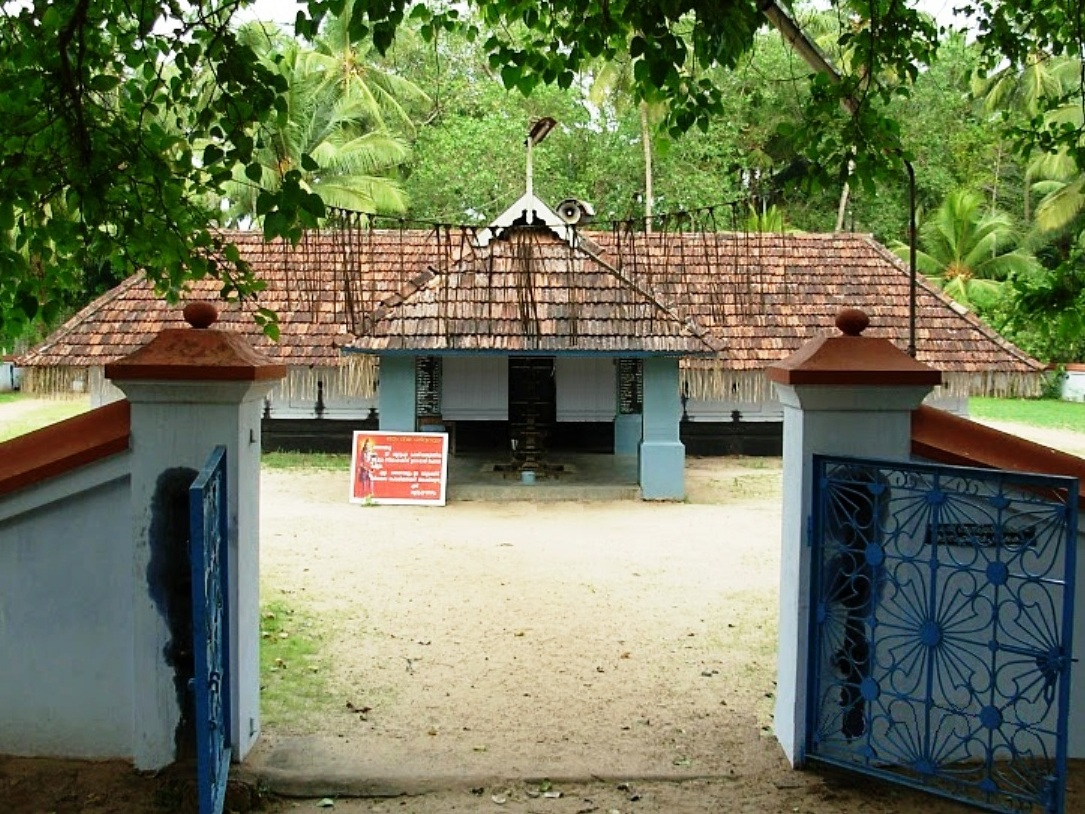
- Temple Entrance

- Muttichur Kallattupuzha Sri Maha Siva Temple, Anthikad, Thrissur, Kerala

Religion
- Affiliation: Hinduism
- District: Thrissur
- Deity: Shiva
- Festival: Maha Shivaratri

Location
- Location: Anthikad
- State: Kerala
- Country: India
- Interactive map of Muttichur Kallattupuzha Sri Maha Siva Temple
- Coordinates: 10.443147°N 76.105974°E

Architecture
- Type: Kerala style
- Completed: Not known

Specifications
- Temple: One
- Monument: 1
- Elevation: 33.03 m (108 ft)

The Muttichur Kallattupuzha Sri Maha Siva Temple is located in Anthikad in Thrissur district of Kerala. This temple is a classic example of the Kerala style of architecture. Kallattupuzha Temple is situated on the banks of the Karuvannur River and the presiding deity of the temple is Shiva, located in main sanctum sanatorum, facing west. According to folklore, sage Parashurama has installed the idol. The temple is a part of the 108 famous Shiva temples in Kerala.

== Koka Sandesam ==
Muttichur and Siva Temple is mentioned in "Koka sandesam" poem, which is believed to have been written about 2700 years ago.

== See also ==
- Temples of Kerala
