= Cheruvathur Mahadeva Temple =

Hindu temple in Kerala, India

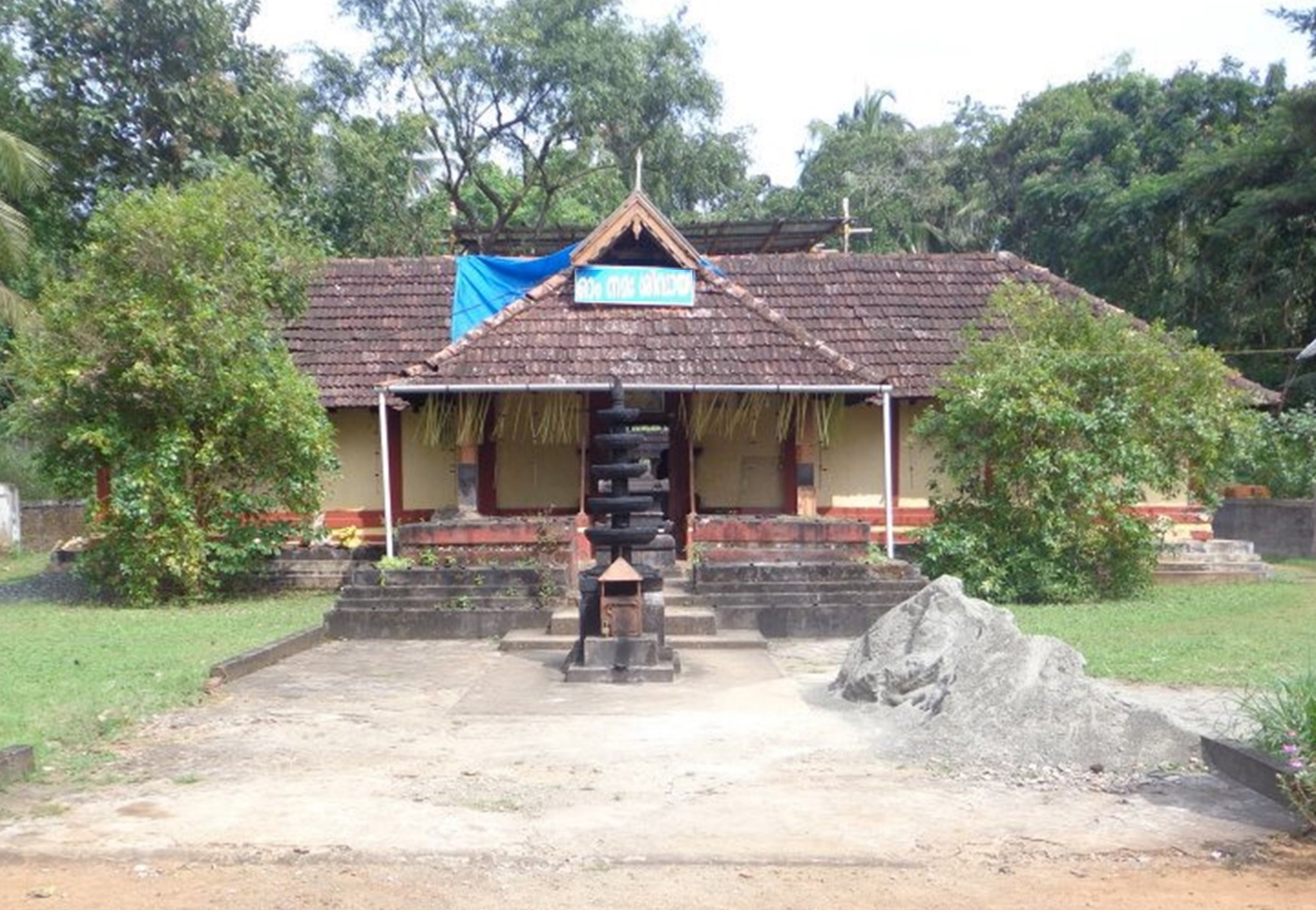
- Temple Entrance

Religion
- Affiliation: Hinduism
- District: Thrissur
- Deity: Shiva
- Festival: Maha Shivaratri

Location
- Location: Kunnamkulam
- State: Kerala
- Country: India
- Interactive map of Cheruvathur Mahadeva Temple
- Coordinates: 10.6584883°N 76.0719567°E

Architecture
- Type: Kerala style
- Completed: Not known
- Monument: 1

Cheruvathur Sri Mahadeva Temple, located in Kunnamkulam town of Thrissur district of Kerala. The presiding deity of the temple is Shiva, located in main sanctum sanatorium facing east. According to folklore, sage Parasurama has installed the idol. The temple is a part of the 108 famous Shiva temples in Kerala. Most of the ancient temples in Kerala have some mythology narrating its origin. Cheruvathur Sri Mahadeva Temple has numerous legends connecting to its popularity to this day. Most prominent legend is that it is one of the 108 Siva temples of Kerala established by sage Parasurama. Lord Mahadeva in Cheruvathur is worshipped as "Cheruvathurappan" in this temple. The East facing Sanctum sanctorum is placed here in the shape of circular with copper roof.

== Location ==
While the Cheruvathur village is in Kasaragod district, the Cheruvathur Mahadeva Temple is in Kunnamkulam of Thrissur District and is presumed to be the presiding deity was at Kasaragod district. From there it can be subsequently replaced near Kunnamkulam. Temple situated in Cheruvathur 1 km away from Kunnamkulam town.

== See also ==
- 108 Shiva Temples
- Temples of Kerala

== Temple Photos ==
Cheruvathur Mahadeva Temple

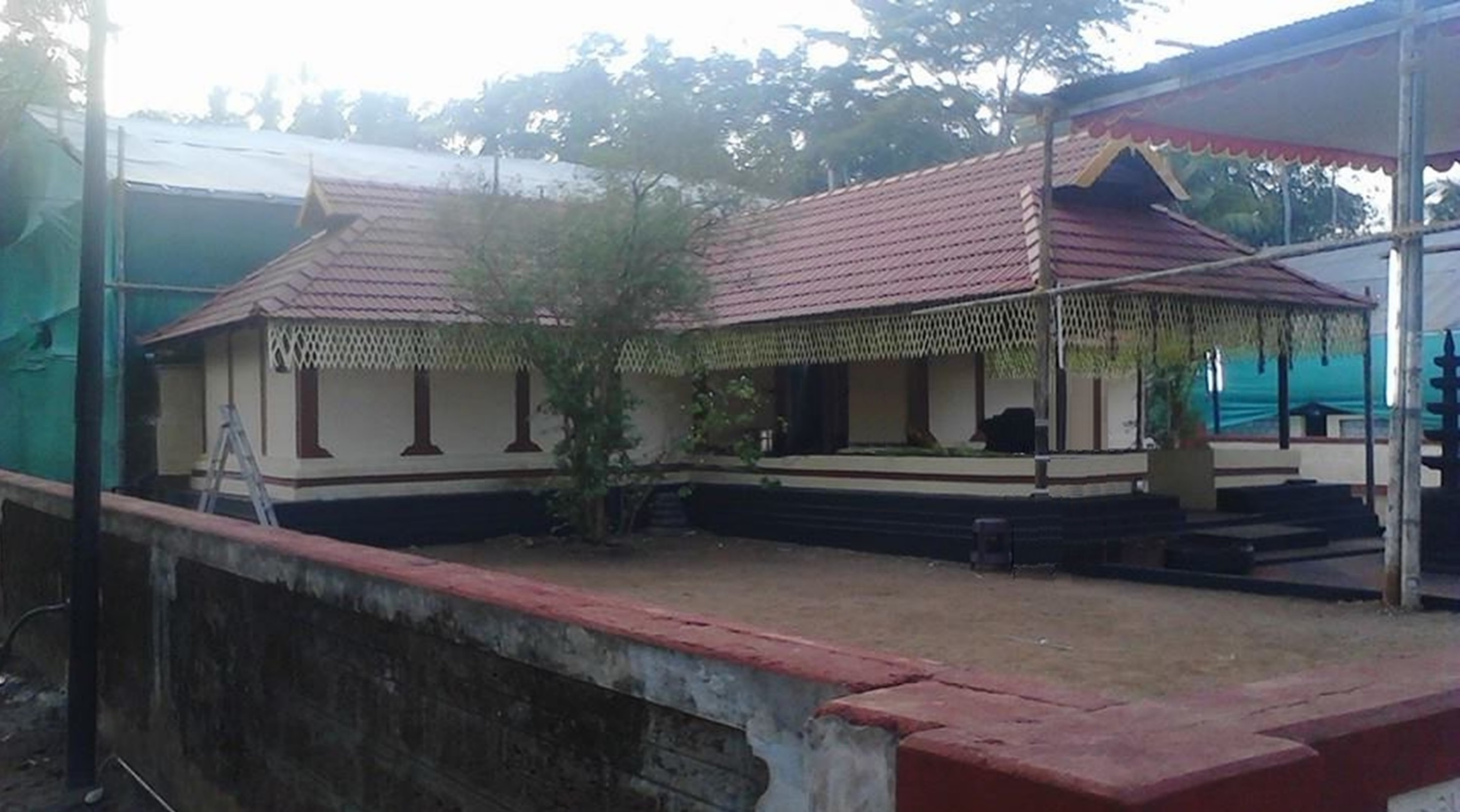
Nalambalam and Balikalpura

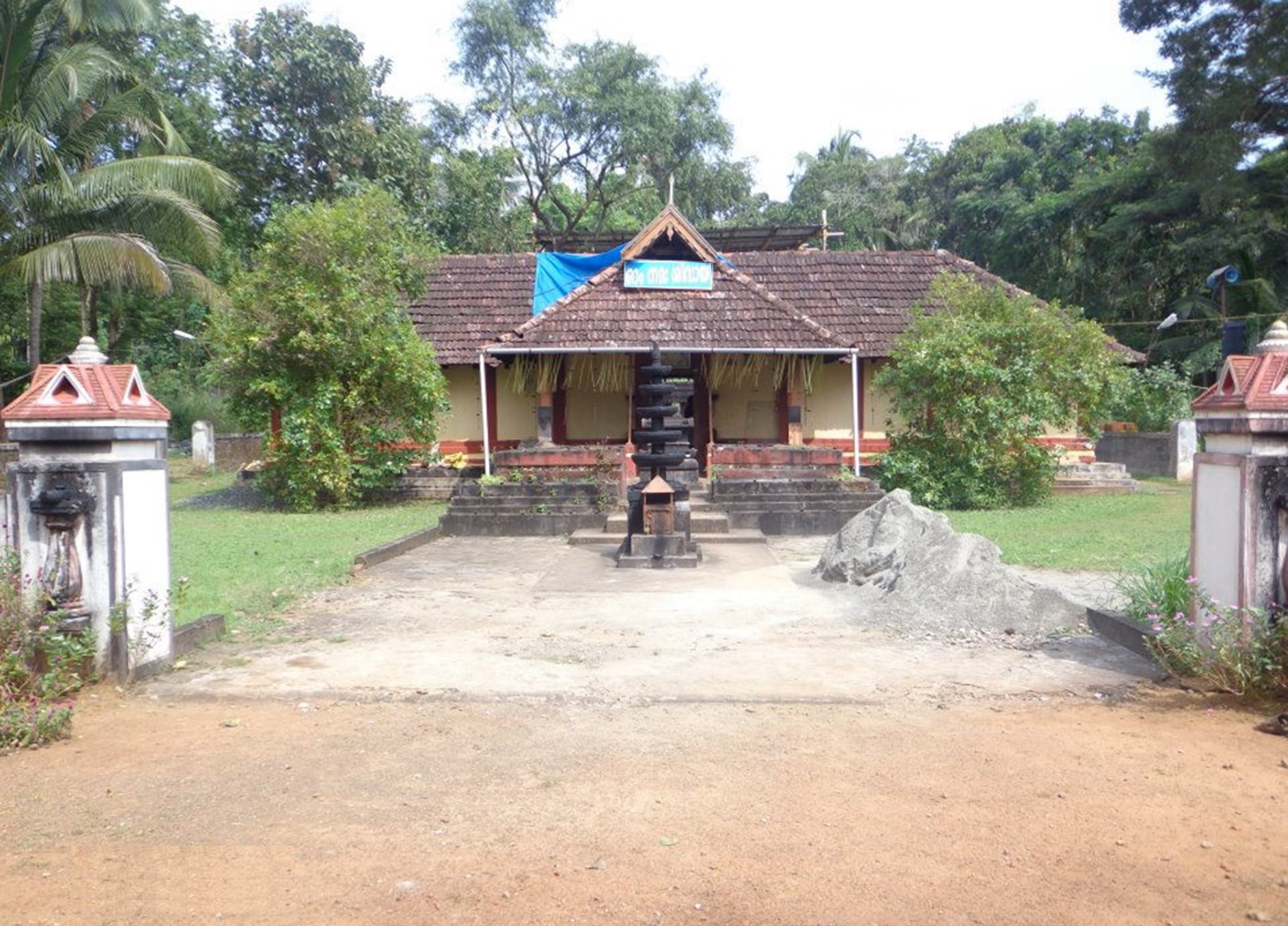
Temple Entrance

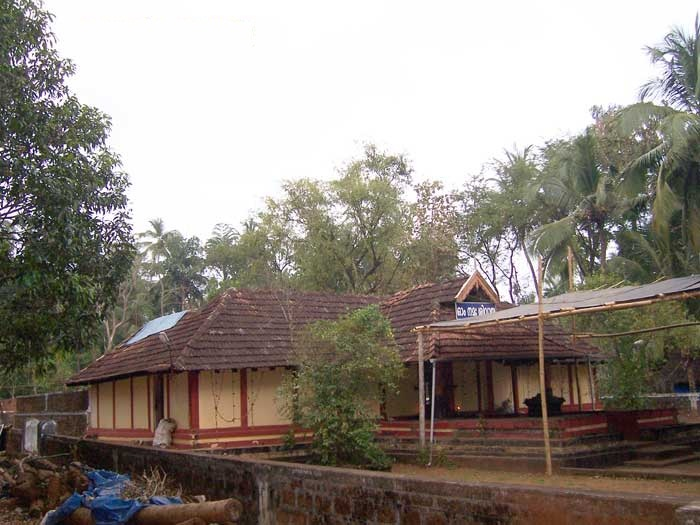
Nalambalam

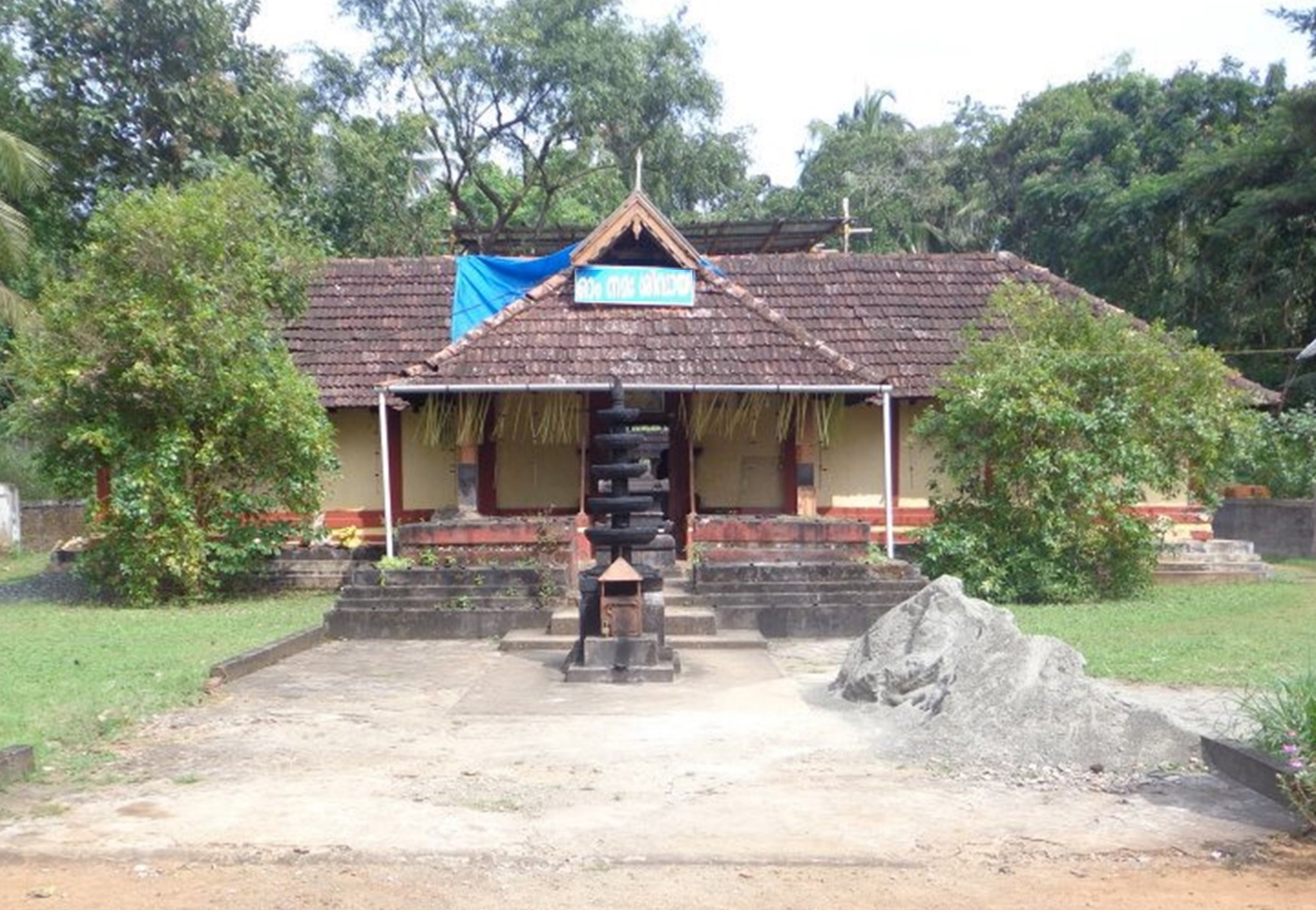
Front view
