= Thrichattukulam Mahadeva Temple =

Hindu temple in Kerala, India

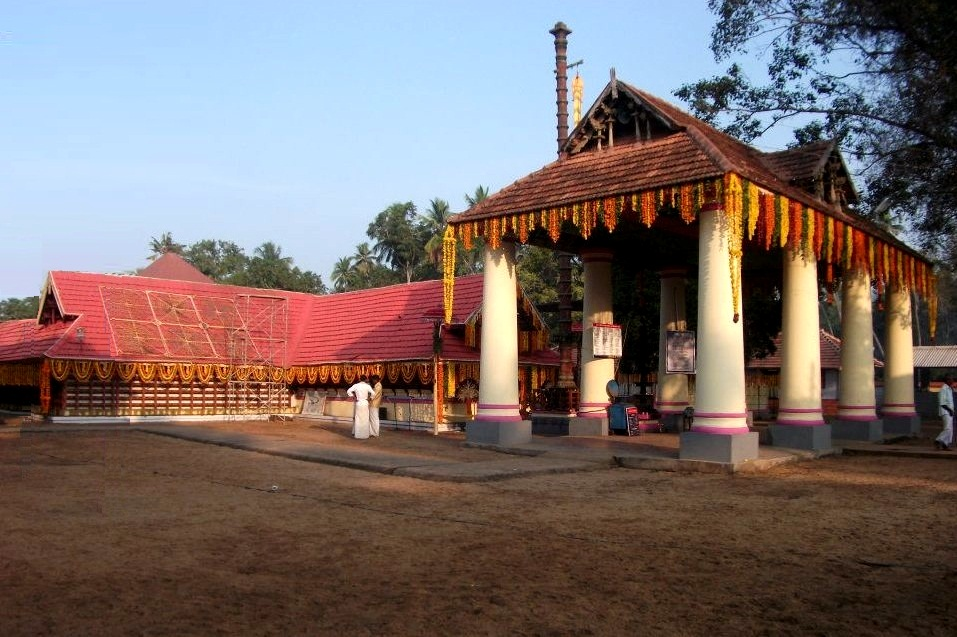
- Main Temple Structure

- Thiruchattukulam Mahadeva Temple, Panavally, Alappuzha, Kerala

Religion
- Affiliation: Hinduism
- District: Alappuzha
- Deity: Shiva
- Festival: Maha Shivaratri

Location
- Location: Panavally
- State: Kerala
- Country: India
- Interactive map of Thrichattukulam Mahadeva Temple
- Coordinates: 9.832877°N 76.332145°E

Architecture
- Type: Kerala style
- Creator: Chera Dynasty
- Completed: Not known (believed to be thousands of years old)

Specifications
- Temple: One
- Monument: 1
- Elevation: 25.89 m (85 ft)

Thrichattukulam Mahadeva Temple (Malayalam: തൃച്ചാറ്റുകുളം മഹാദേവക്ഷേത്രം) is an ancient Hindu temple dedicated to Lord Shiva is situated on the banks of the Vembanad Lake at Panavally Island of Alleppey District in Kerala state in India. The Thrichattukulam Mahadeva Temple is one of the three important shiva Temple in Karappuram Kingdom (Malayalam: കരപ്പുറം രാജ്യം) in Kerala, those are Velorvattom Sri Mahadeva Temple, Nalpathaneeswaram Sree Mahadeva Temple and Thrichattukulam Mahadeva Temple. The temple is a part of the 108 famous Shiva temples in Kerala.

== Temple Architecture ==
The idol of Lord Shiva is worshiped in the east. The temple is built in Kerala Dravidiyan Style and the sacred edifice and sacrificial wall. It is rich with beautiful wooden sculptures. Outside the palace and the altar, a large ivory tower was built along with the east tower. When you look at the size of the ivory tower, the tower is very small. We also see a copper pillar made of copper between the altar and the ivory wall. The temple pond is built on the north-east corner of the east side of the temple.

Ganapati and Bhagavathi are placed in the four pavilions (Nalambalam). The dedication of Bhagavathi was done recently. In 1978, Bhagavathi was settled in Nambalam with the rituals of Tantric judgment. The idol of the Nagayakshi can also be seen in the northwest corner are facing east. The sanctum sanctorum of the temple is made of numerous sculptures. The temple is renowned for its magnificent wood carvings made of plankton. The sanctum sanctorum is made of two types of rectangles and fed with copper plates.
