= Palayoor Mahadeva Temple =

Hypothetical Shiva temple in Kerala, India

- പാലയൂർ മഹാദേവക്ഷേത്രം
- Location within Kerala

Religion
- Affiliation: Hinduism
- District: Thrissur
- Deity: Shiva

Location
- State: Kerala
- Country: India
- Interactive map of Palayoor Mahadeva Temple
- Coordinates: 10.5989°N 76.0358°E

Architecture
- Type: Kerala Architecture
- Creator: Built by Cheraman Perumal (Nayanar)

Palayur Mahadeva Temple (Malayalam: പാലയൂർ മഹാദേവക്ഷേത്രം) was a legendary temple located in Palayoor near Chavakkad in the Thrissur district in ancient Kerala. This Shiva temple was later converted into a Christian church with the arrival of St. Thomas in Malabar, Kerala. Palayoor Mahadeva (Siva) Temple does not exist today. The temple is believed to be constructed by the first Chera king of Kodungallur. This temple is one among the 108 Shiva temples established by Parasurama. The legends suggest that the installation of the idol of god Mahadeva (Shiva) was performed by Parasurama himself.

== Legend ==
Palayur was the stronghold of the Brahmins. When St. Thomas arrived from Kodungallur, Jews had a settlement at Palayur, two thousand years ago. Ruins of an ancient Jewish synagogue are still seen outside of a temple about a furlong away from the Church. The origin of Christians in Kerala dates back to AD 52 when St. Thomas landed at the port of Kodungalloor. He visited various parts of Kerala and converted the natives including Namboothiri.
