= Annamanada Mahadeva Temple =

Hindu temple in Kerala, India

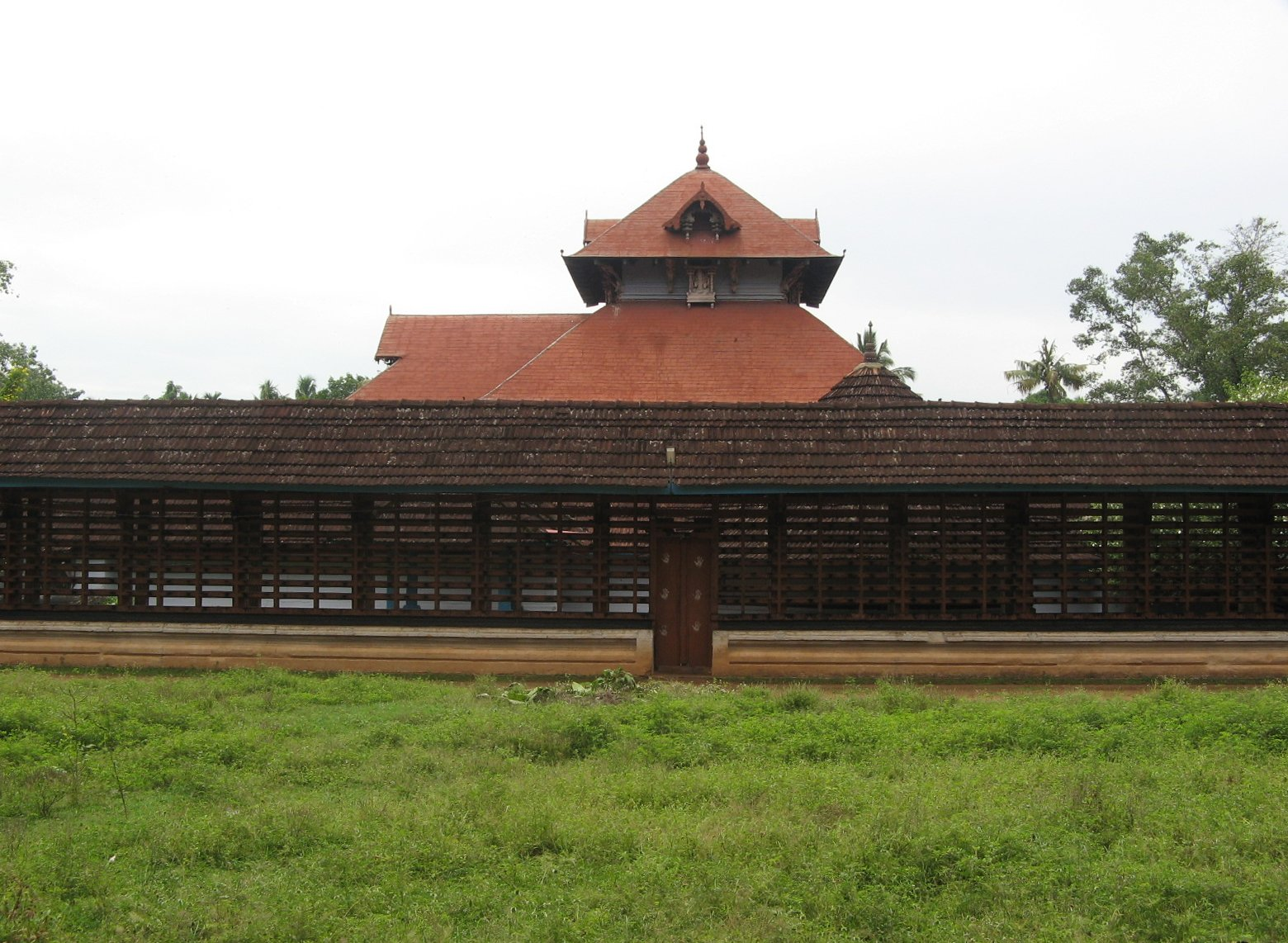

- Mahadeva Temple, Annamanada, Thrissur, Kerala

Religion
- Affiliation: Hinduism
- District: Thrissur
- Deity: Shiva
- Festival: Maha Shivaratri

Location
- Location: Annamanada, Thrissur
- State: Kerala
- Country: India
- Coordinates: 10.2348°N 76.3310°E

Architecture
- Type: Architecture of Kerala
- Elevation: 28.59 m (94 ft)

Annamanada Mahadeva Temple is a Hindu temple at Annamanada in Thrissur district, Kerala, India. The presiding deity is Shiva. The shivling is almost four feet tall and is considered as the Kirathamoorthy in a pleasing mood while giving Pashupatastra to Arjuna. It is one of the 108 Shiva Temples in ancient Kerala, believed to have been consecrated by Parashurama, the Sixth avatar of Vishnu.

== See also ==
- Temples of Kerala
