= Avanoor Sreekanteswaram Mahadeva Temple =

- Sreekanteswaram Mahadeva Temple, Avanur, Thrissur, Kerala

Religion
- Affiliation: Hinduism
- District: Thrissur
- Deity: Shiva
- Festival: Maha Shivaratri

Location
- Location: Avanur
- State: Kerala
- Country: India
- Interactive map of Avanoor Sreekanteswaram Mahadeva Temple
- Coordinates: 10.611441°N 76.176018°E

Architecture
- Type: Architecture of Kerala

Specifications
- Temple: One
- Elevation: 32.59 m (107 ft)

Avanoor Sreekanteswaram Mahadeva is located at Avanur, Thrissur district, Kerala. The presiding deity of the temple is Shiva. It is believed that this temple is one of the 108 Shiva temples of Kerala and is installed by sage Parasurama dedicated to Shiva.

== See also ==
- 108 Shiva Temples
- Temples of Kerala
