= Kottappuram Siva Temple =

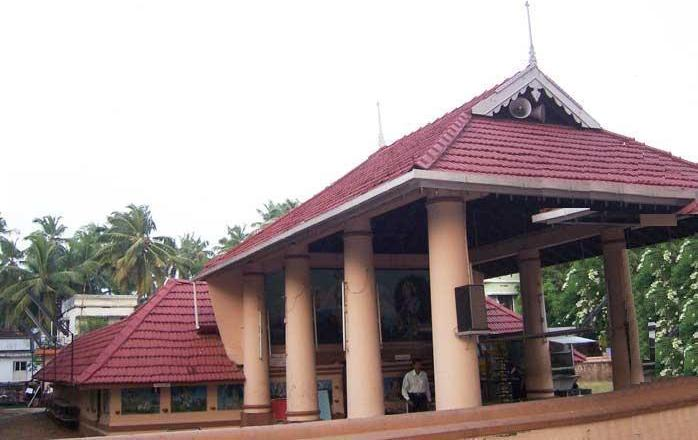
- Kottappuram Siva Temple, Thrissur Kerala

- Kottappuram Siva temple, Kottappuram, Thrissur, Kerala

Religion
- Affiliation: Hinduism
- District: Thrissur
- Deity: Shiva
- Festival: Maha Shivaratri

Location
- Location: Poothole, Kottappuram, Thrissur, Kerala, India
- State: Kerala
- Country: India
- Interactive map of Kottappuram Siva Temple
- Coordinates: 10.525868°N 76.205716°E

Architecture
- Type: Architecture of Kerala
- Creator: Parashurama

Specifications
- Temple: One
- Elevation: 30.8 m (101 ft)

Kottappuram Siva Temple is one of the 108 Shiva Temples in India. This temple is situated near to Vadakkunnathan Temple in Kerala.

== Location ==
Kottappuram Siva temple is located with the coordinates of 10.525868°N 76.205716°E at Poothole, Kottappuram, Thrissur, Kerala in India. It is said that this temple was installed by Parashurama.
