= Perumparampu Sri Mahadeva Temple =

Hindu temple in India

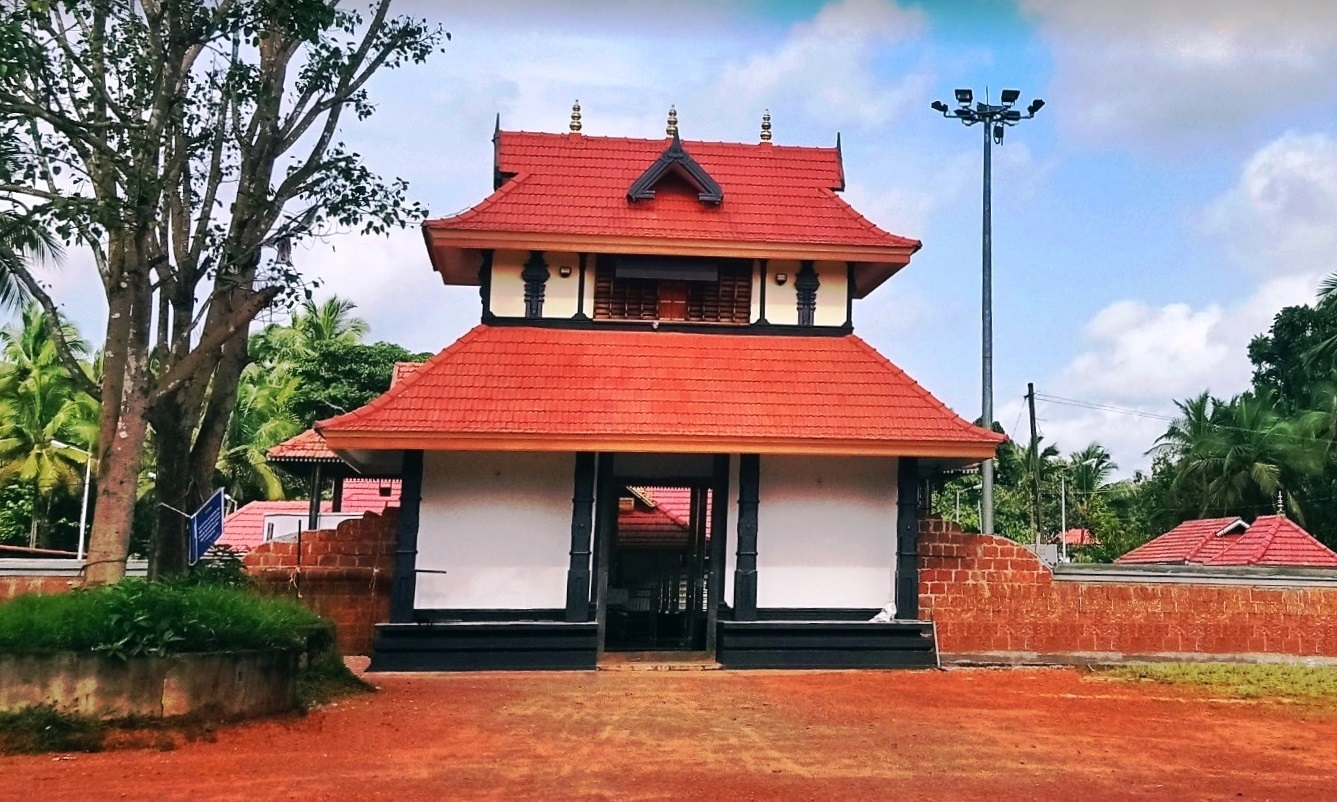
- West Tower

Religion
- Affiliation: Hinduism
- District: Malappuram
- Deity: Shiva
- Festival: Maha Shivaratri

Location
- Location: Edappal
- State: Kerala
- Country: India
- Interactive map of Perumparampu Sri Mahadeva Temple
- Coordinates: 10.803108°N 75.9958814°E

Architecture
- Type: Kerala style
- Completed: Reconstructed in 2010
- Monument: 1

Website
- Perumparampu

Perumparampu Sri Mahadeva Temple is located at Edappal in Malappuram district. The main deity of the temple is Shiva in the sanctum sanctorum facing west. It is believed that this temple is one of the 108 Shiva temples of Kerala and is installed by sage Parasurama dedicated to Shiva. The temple is located around 3 km away from Edappal on the route of Edappal - Parappuram - Ayankalam Road. The main sanctum santorium is two storey building shape of square in Kukkudakruthy styled and is centuries old. Sri Parashurama is believed to have started this shiva lingam at ancient Paraparampu village.

== See also ==
- 108 Shiva Temples
- Temples of Kerala

== Temple images ==
Various Photos of Iranikulam Sree Mahadeva Temple

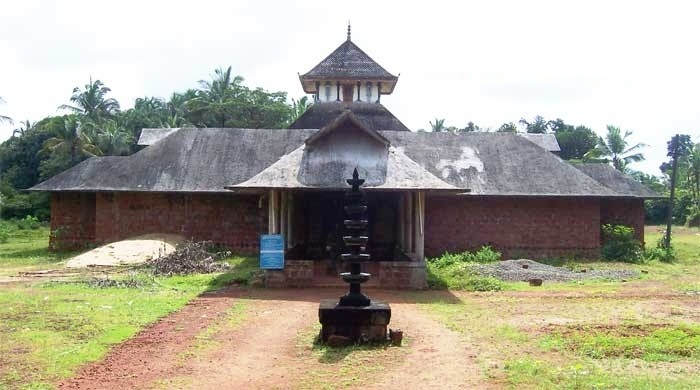
Temple

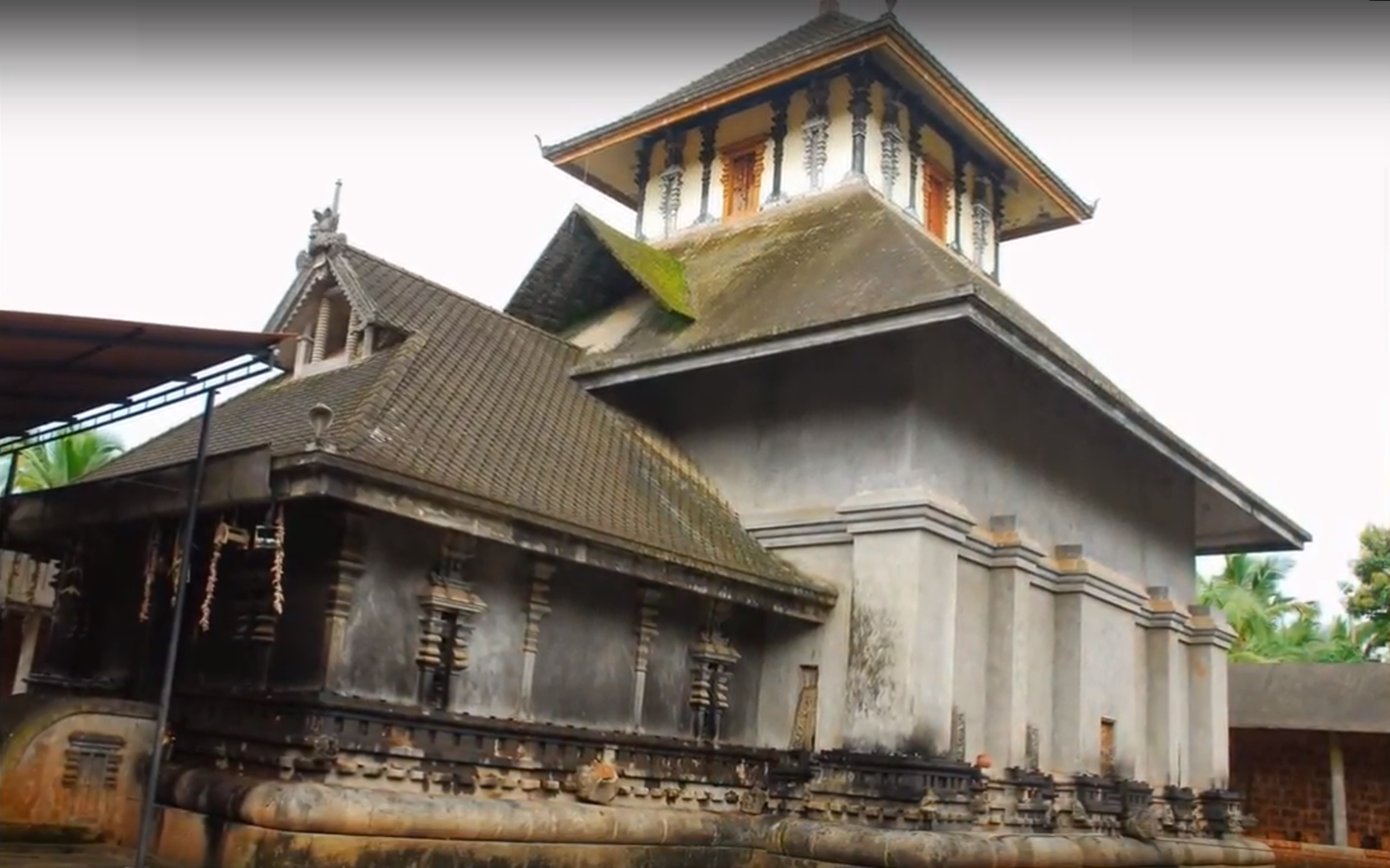
Sanctum Santorium

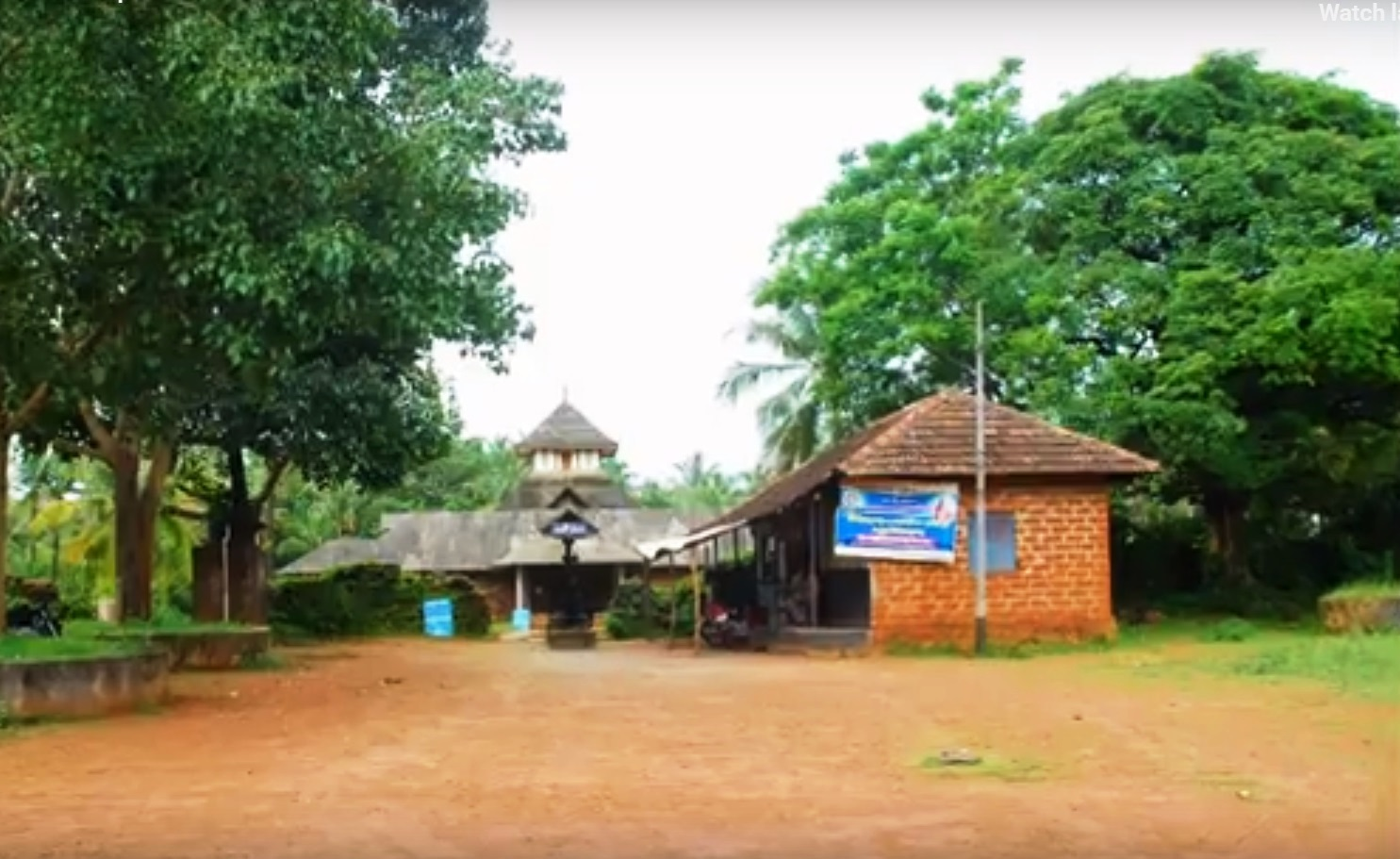
Nalambalam West Entrance

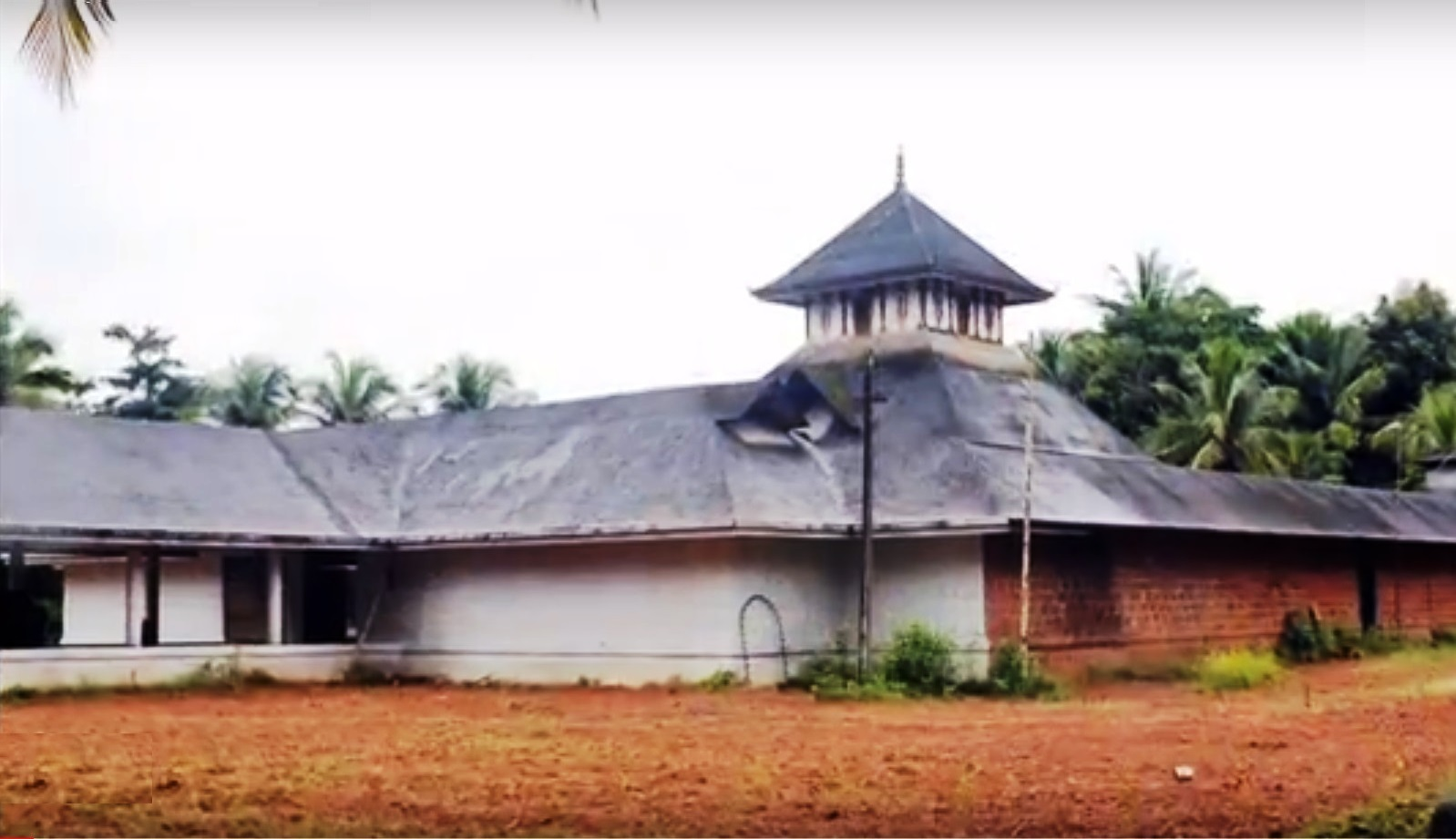
Nalambalam

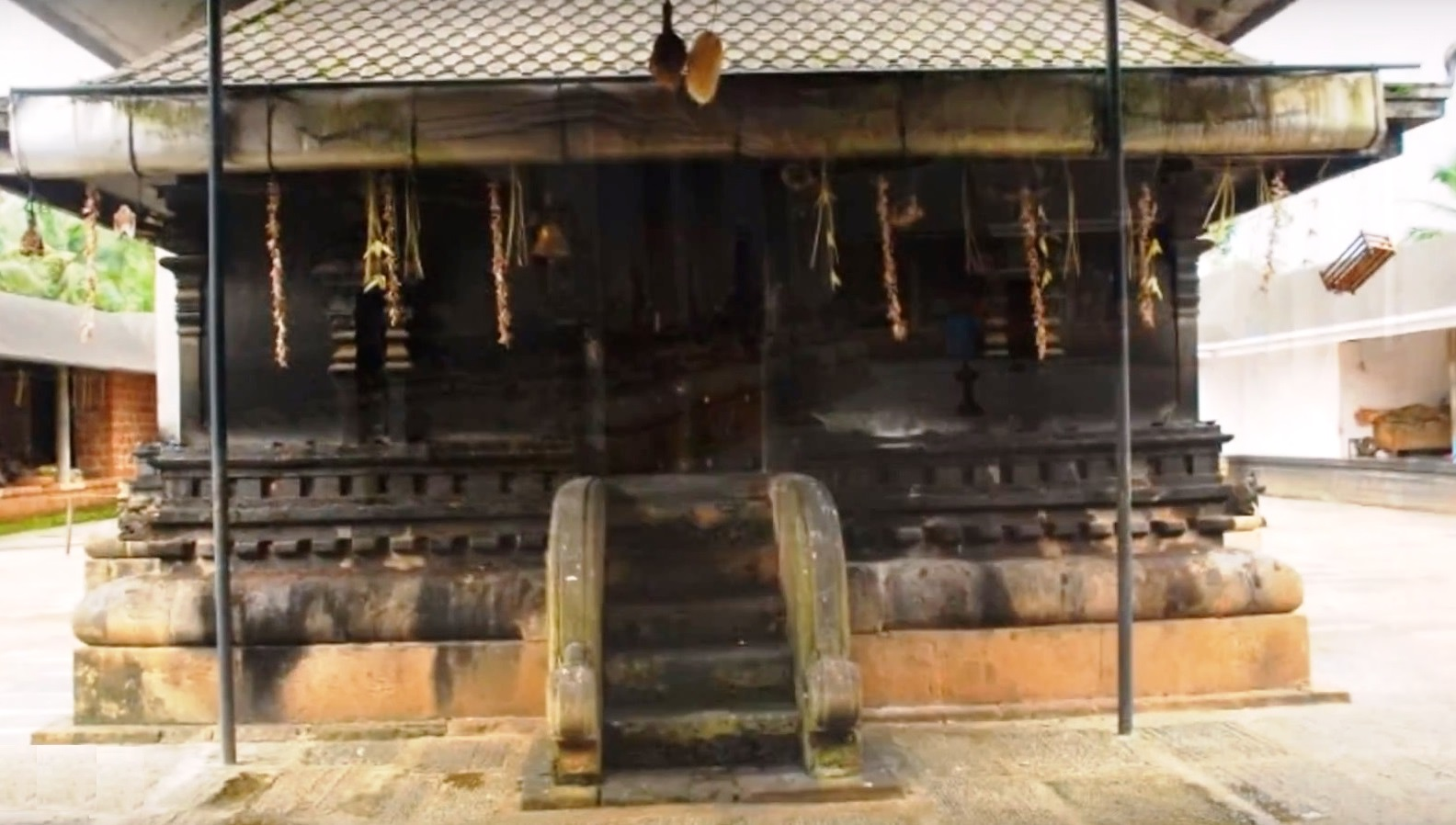
Sreekovil
