= Chowara Chidambaraswamy Temple =

Hindu temple in India

Chowwara Chidambaraswamy Temple
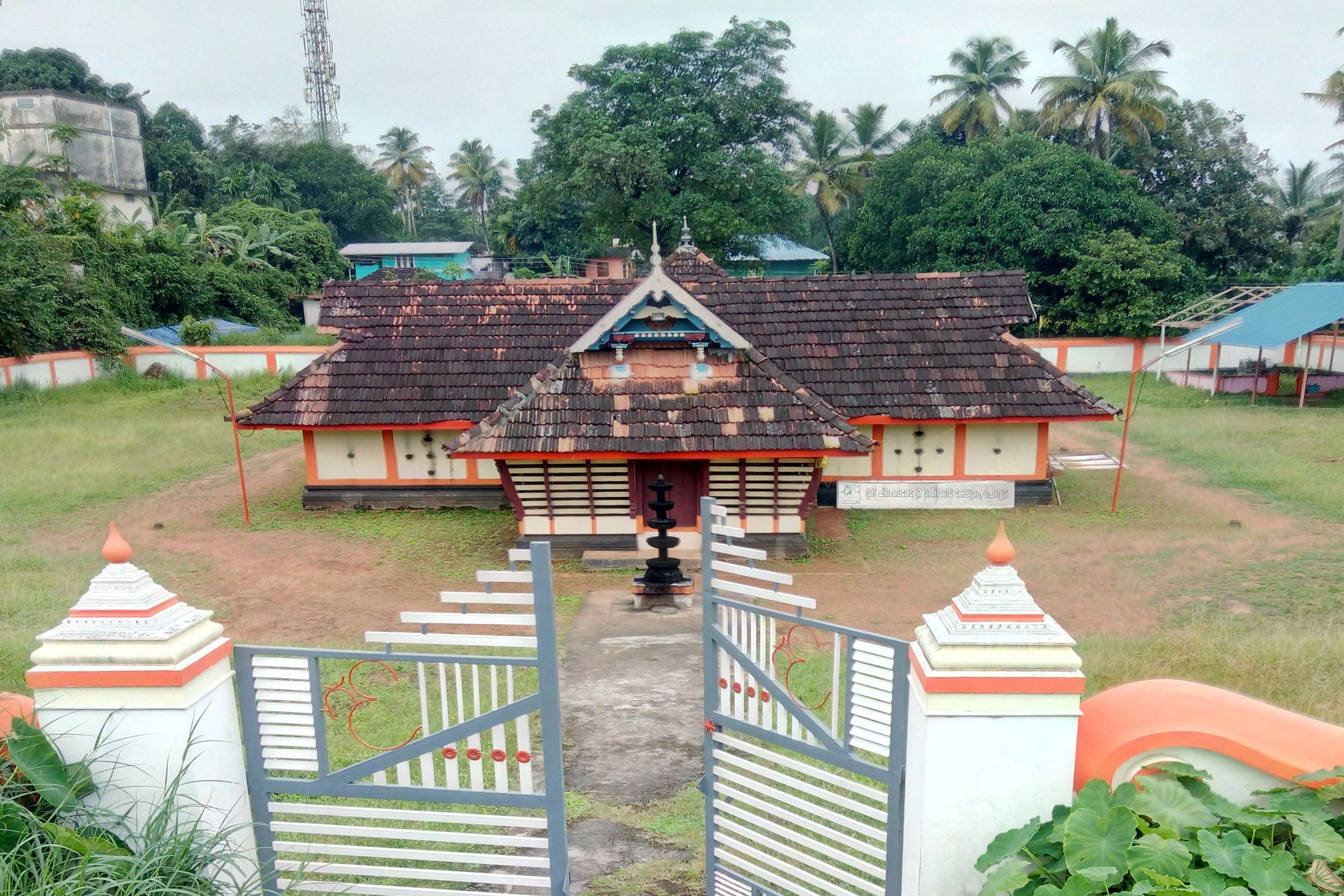
- Entrance

- Sree Chidambareswara Mahadeva Temple, Chowara, Ernakulam, Kerala

Religion
- Affiliation: Hinduism
- District: Ernakulam
- Deity: Natarajan
- Festival: Maha Shivaratri

Location
- Location: Chowara
- State: Kerala
- Country: India
- Interactive map of Chowwara Chidambaraswamy Temple
- Coordinates: 10.126145°N 76.386753°E

Architecture
- Type: Kerala style
- Completed: Not known

Specifications
- Temple: One
- Monument: 1
- Elevation: 35.44 m (116 ft)

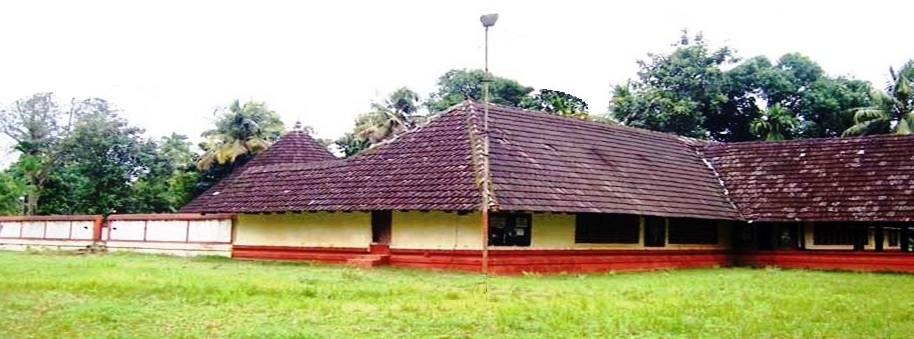

Chowara Chidambaraswamy Temple is located at Chowara in Ernakulam district. The presiding deities of north shrine are Shiva in the form of Nataraja, in the sanctum sanctorum facing east. It is believed that this temple is one of the 108 Shiva temples of Kerala and is installed by sage Parasurama dedicated to Shiva. Maha Shivarathri festival of the temple celebrates in the Malayalam month of Kumbha (February - March).

== See also ==
- 108 Shiva Temples
- Temples of Kerala
