= Veeranimangalam Mahadeva Temple =

Hindu temple in Kerala, India

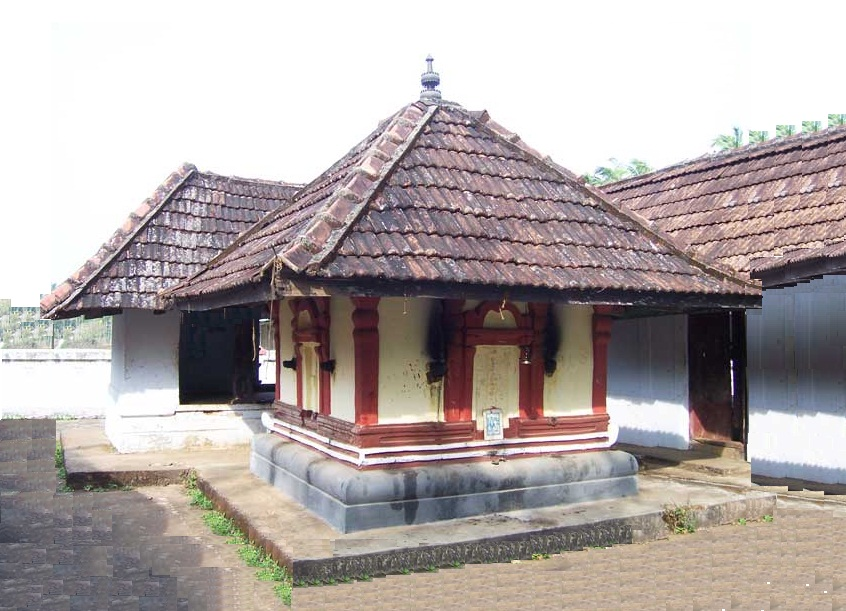
- Sanctum Sanctorum

Religion
- Affiliation: Hinduism
- District: Thrissur
- Deity: Shiva, Narasimha
- Festivals: Maha Shivaratri, Narasimha Jayanti

Location
- Location: Enkakkad
- State: Kerala
- Country: India
- Interactive map of Veeranimangalam Mahadeva Temple
- Coordinates: 10.655212549887521°N 76.25749204258511°E

Architecture
- Type: Kerala style
- Completed: more than 1000 years
- Temple: 2

Veeranimangalam Mahadeva Temple is an ancient Hindu temple dedicated to Lord Shiva and Lord Narasimha is situated at Enkakkad of Thrissur District in Kerala state in India. The Lord Shiva of the temple is the Shiva Lingam facing west. The temple structure is made kerala-dravidian architecture style and is more than 1000 years old. According to folklore, sage Parasurama has installed the idol of Lord Shiva. The sage Parasurama is the sixth incarnation of Lord Maha Vishnu. The temple is a part of the famous 108 Shiva temples of Kerala and references to this temple (Ambilikkad) is found in 108 Shivalaya sothram.

== Temple Structure ==
The Veeranimangalam temple is situated south part of Wadakkancherry Taluk in Enkakkad village. This is one of the prominent temples of the taluk. The temple comprises a plot of land about two acres. The temples of Lord Shiva are of great significance when inspecting temple architecture. The over-all temple complex faces west. Main deity of the temple is Lord Shiva; however Narasimha moorthy is the presiding power in the Temple. There is a large pool on the west side of the temple. The pond was constructed to confront the Shiva temple of Lord Shiva.

== Narasimha moorthy ==
Lord Narasimha is also associated with Lord Shiva and given importance to Lord Narasimha Swamy Temple. Sanctum Sanctorum of Lord Narasimha Swamy is facing to west. It is believed that the temple of Narasimha is believed to have done relief of anger of Lord Shiva.

== Sub Deities ==
- Maha Vishnu
- Ganapathy
- Ayyappan
- Murugan
- Snake Goddess
- Sreekrishnan

== See also ==
- 108 Shiva Temples
- Temples of Kerala
