= Thrikkandiyur Mahadeva temple =

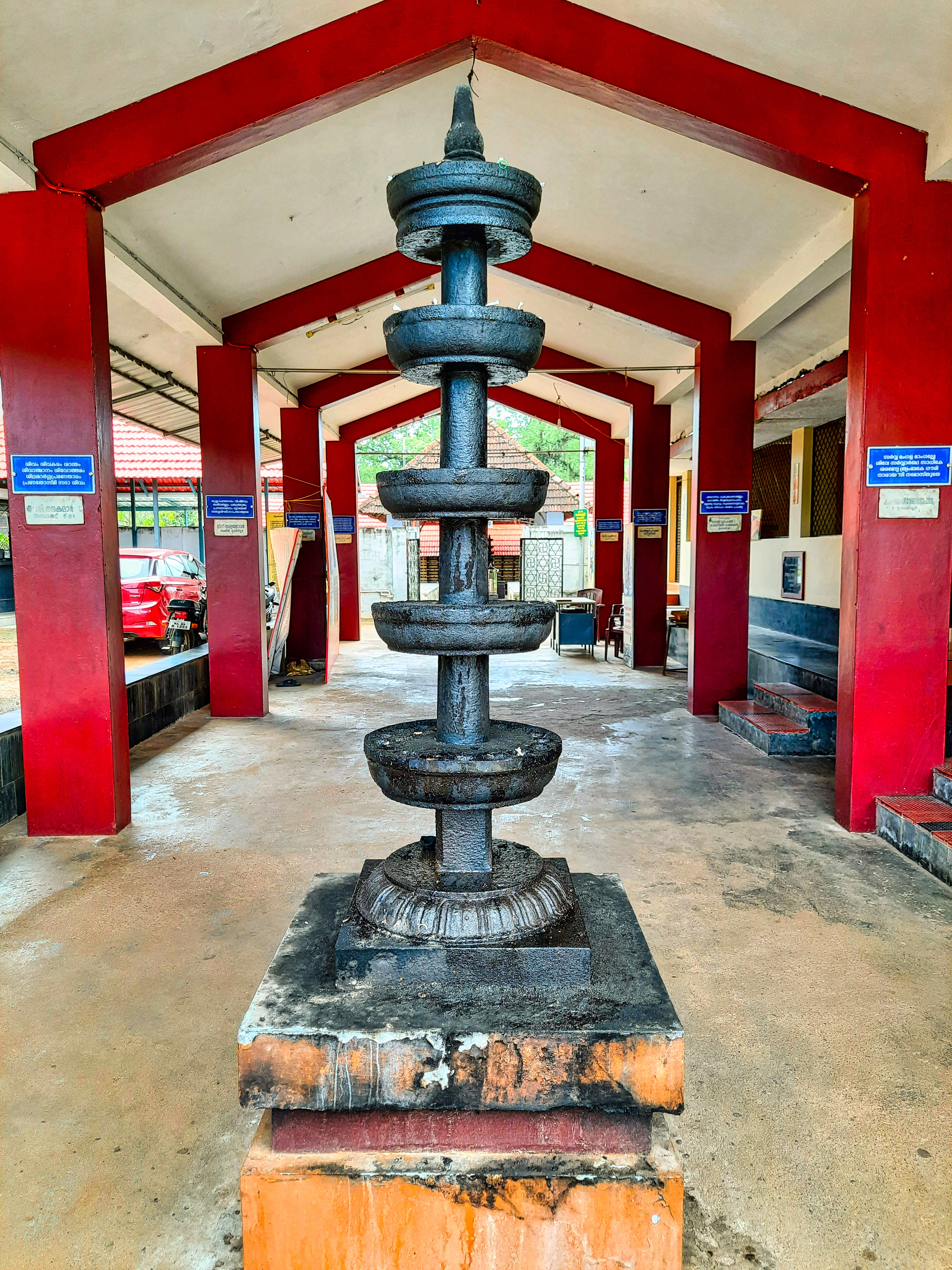

- Thrikkandiyur Mahadeva temple Malappuram, Kerala

Religion
- Affiliation: Hinduism
- District: Malappuram
- Deity: Mahadeva
- Festival: Maha Shivaratri

Location
- Location: Tirur, Malappuram, Kerala, India
- State: Kerala
- Country: India
- Interactive map of Thrikkandiyur Mahadeva temple
- Coordinates: 10.9055°N 75.9238°E

Architecture
- Type: Architecture of Kerala
- Creator: Parashurama

Specifications
- Temple: One
- Elevation: 32.81 m (108 ft)

Thrikkandiyur Mahadeva temple is one of the 108 Shiva temples in India.

== Location ==
This temple is located with the coordinates of 10.9055°N 75.9238°E at Tirur neighbourhood in Malappuram district of Kerala state in India.

== Installation ==
It is said that Lord Parashurama, the legendary creator of Kerala, had installed the idol of this ancient temple.
