= Chakkamkulangara Siva Temple =

Hindu temple in Kerala, India

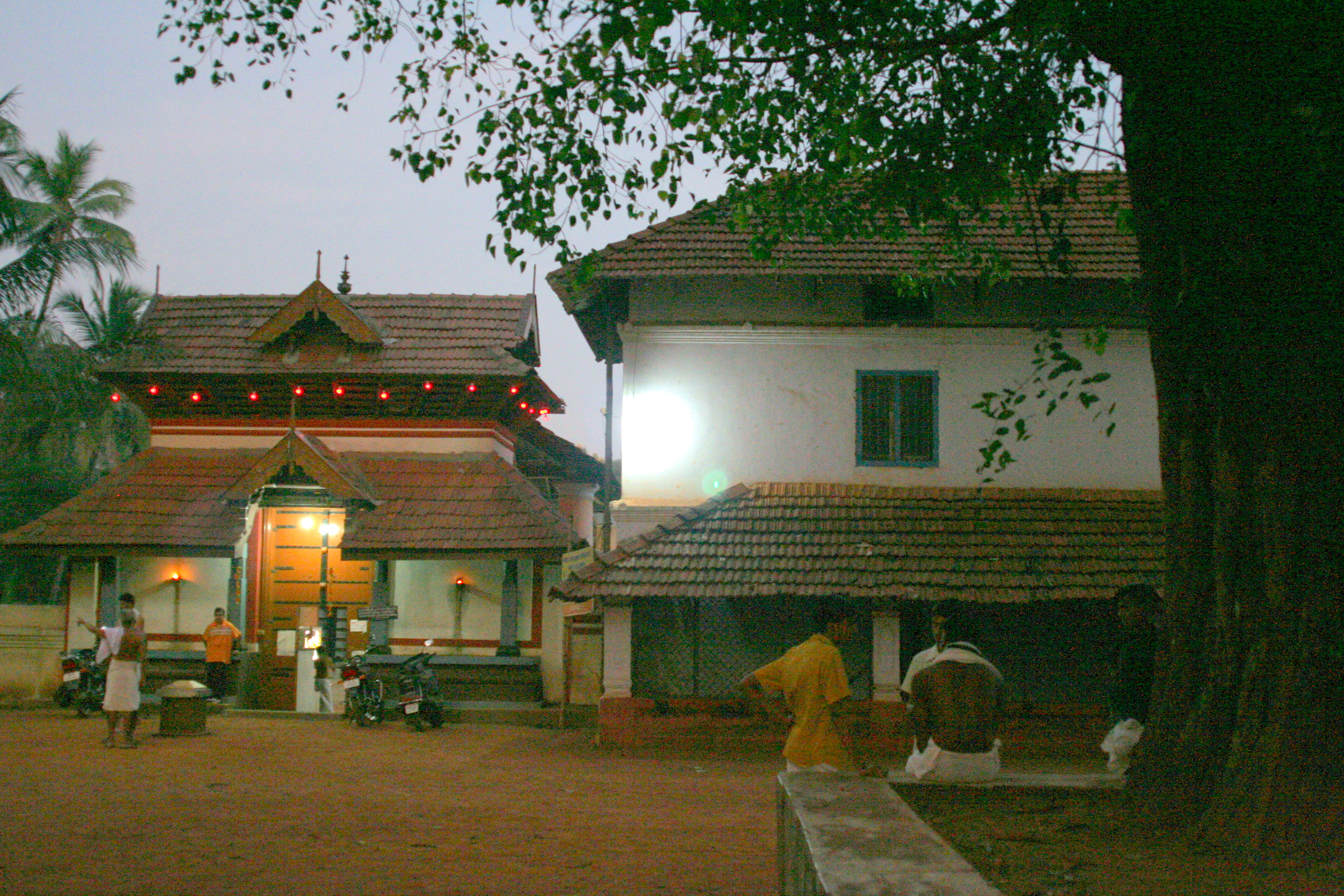
- Temple Tower (Gopuram)

Religion
- Affiliation: Hinduism
- District: Ernakulam
- Deity: Shiva, Parvati
- Festival: Maha Shivaratri

Location
- Location: Chakkamkulangara
- State: Kerala
- Country: India
- Interactive map of Chakkamkulangara Siva Temple
- Coordinates: 9.9491519°N 76.3455031°E

Architecture
- Type: Kerala style
- Temple: 1

Chakkamkulangara Siva Temple is an ancient Hindu temple dedicated to Lord Shiva and Devi Parvathi is situated at Thrippunithura of Ernakulam District in Kerala state in India. The Chakkamkulangara temple is dedicated to Lord Shiva however temple is equally famous for the Navagraha pratishta. The Lord Shiva of the temple represents the Swayamvara moorthy though originally it was in the form of "Mrityunjaya" in his fierce ('ugra') form, facing west, featuring eight hands with various attributes. Thrippunithura is one of the Brahmin settlement in the ancient Kerala and Capital of Cochin kingdom. The temple structure is made kerala-dravidian architecture style and is more than 1000 years old. According to folklore, sage Parasurama has installed the idol of Lord Shiva. The sage Parasurama is the sixth incarnation of Lord Maha Vishnu. The temple is a part of the famous 108 Shiva temples of Kerala and references to this temple (Adampalli) is found in 108 Shivalaya sothram.

== Temple Structure ==
The Chakkamkulangara temple is situated north side of the Poornathrayeesa Temple in Thrippunithura. This is one of the prominent temples of the Cochin Kingdom. The inner sanctum sanctorum is dedicated to Lord Shiva and the Goddess Parvati Devi is behind it. The sanctum sanctorum of Chakamkulangara is facing to west. There is a large pool on the west side of the temple. The pond was constructed to confront the Shiva temple of Lord Shiva.

== Sivarathri Festival ==
Temple celebrates 7 days Sivarathri festival in the Malayalam month of Kumbham (February - March) in every year.

== See also ==
- 108 Shiva Temples
- Temples of Kerala
