= Mathoor =

Village in Pathanamthitta District, Kerala, India

Coordinates: 9.239°N 76.741°E

Mathoor is a hamlet located near Omallur in the Pathanamthitta district of Kerala, India.

== Religious Centres ==
- Mathoorkavu Bhagavathi Kshethram
- St. George Orthodox Church
- St. George Malankara Catholic Church
- Thumpinpadu Nagaraja Temple
- Mahadeva Temple Puliparamala
