= Parippu Mahadeva Temple =

- പരിപ്പ് മഹാദേവ ക്ഷേത്രം
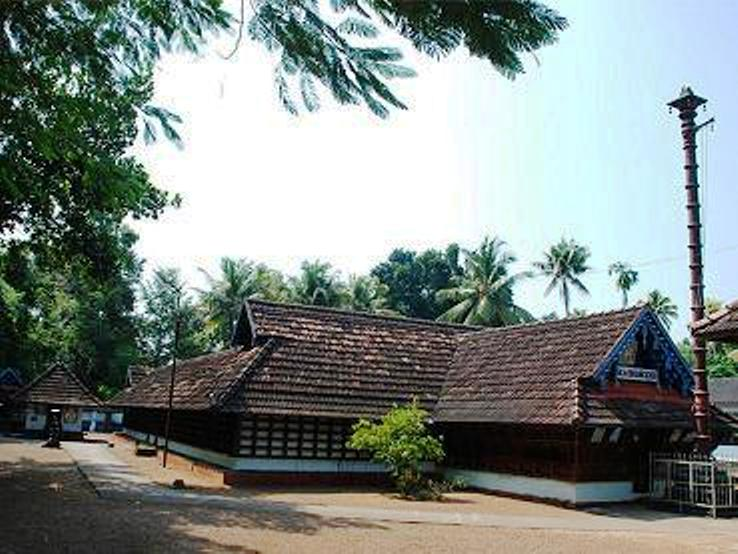
- Parippu Mahadeva temple

- Mahadeva Temple, Parippu, Aymanam, Kottayam, Kerala

Religion
- Affiliation: Hinduism
- District: Kottayam
- Deity: Shiva
- Festivals: Thiruvutsavam in Meenan, Maha Shivaratri
- Governing body: Travancore Devaswom Board

Location
- Location: Parippu, Aymanam
- State: Kerala
- Country: India
- Interactive map of Parippu Mahadeva Temple
- Coordinates: 9.619664°N 76.477090°E

Architecture
- Type: Traditional Kerala style
- Creator: Madathil raja
- Completed: 825 AD
- Temple: One

Parippu Mahadeva Temple is a Hindu temple located in Parippu in Aymanam panchayath of Kottayam district, in the Indian state of Kerala. This temple mentioned as Nalparappil in the renowned Shivalaya stotra is closely related to Thekkumkur raja. Currently it is administered by Travancore Devaswom Board. Bhadrakali Mattappally Nambudiri holds the tantric rights of the temple.

== Deity ==
The presiding deity there is Lord Shiva, facing east. It is believed to be one among the 108 'Shivalayas' consecrated by Lord Parashurama. Krishna, Sastha, Ganapathy and Bhagavathy are the subordinate deities. The main offerings to the deity are Dhara, Pinvilakku, Pushpanjali, Payasam and Koovalamala.

== Legend ==
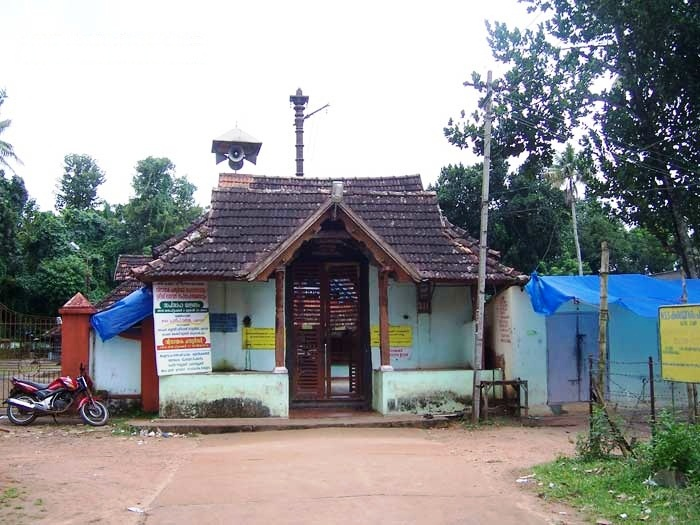
Gopuram (tower) of the temple

The present temple was built by the 'Madathil Raja' (Edappally raja) in 825 AD. He belonged to Madathil palace near Parippu. The local chieftain Idathil Raja was not on good terms with him and both rajas, devoted to Lord Shiva, did not wish to meet at the Mahadeva temple that they visited regularly. As a solution, two 'Balikkalpuras' (traditional frontage) were constructed in the temple, unlike the other temples in Kerala that only have a single Balikkalpura.

== Festivals ==
The annual festival (Thiruvutsavam) is hosted in the Malayalam month of 'Meenam' (March/April). Maha Shivaratri and Thiruvathira are other noted festive occasions.
