= Kanjiramattam Sree Mahadeva Temple =

Hindu temple in Kerala, India

Kanjiramattom Sree Mahadeva Temple
- കാഞ്ഞിരമറ്റം മഹാദേവ ക്ഷേത്രം
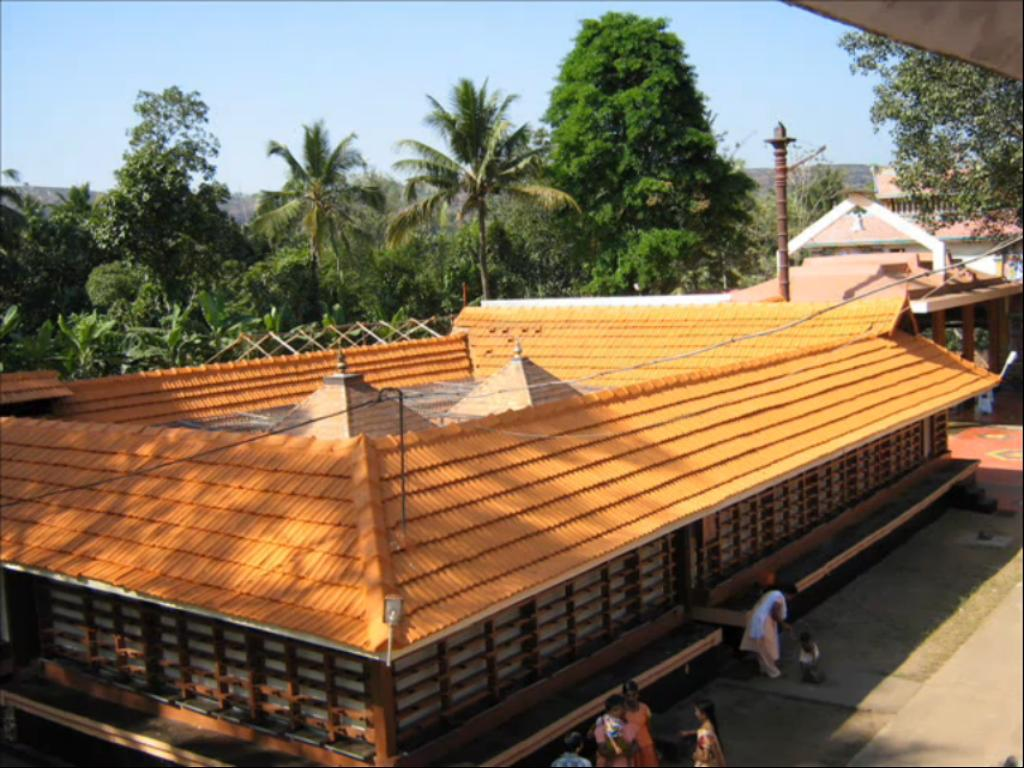
- Kanjiramattom temple

- Kanjiramattom Sree Mahadeva Temple, Thodupuzha, Idukki, Kerala

Religion
- Affiliation: Hinduism
- District: Idukki
- Deity: Shiva

Location
- Location: Thodupuzha
- State: Kerala
- Country: India
- Interactive map of Kanjiramattom Sree Mahadeva Temple
- Coordinates: 9.886869°N 76.720099°E

Architecture
- Type: Traditional Kerala style

Specifications
- Temple: One
- Elevation: 62.34 m (205 ft)

Kanjiramattam Sree Mahadeva Temple, is an ancient Hindu Temple in Idukki district situated on the bank of Thodupuzha River at Kanjiramattam Kara in Thodupuzha Taluk. The temple is located about one and a half kilometers south east of Thodupuzha KSRTC bus stand. It is believed that Kanjiramattam Sree Mahadeva Temple is one of the 108 Shiva temples of Kerala and is installed by sage Parasurama dedicated to Lord Shiva. The deity in the temple is depicted as meditating under a KalpaVriksha with his consort Parvati.The Temple is built in Kerala style of architecture. The sub-deities of the temple are Durga, AmrithakalasaSastha, Ganapati, Vanadurga, Naga deities, Sri Mookambika Devi and Rakshass.
