= Velappaya =

Village in Thrissur District, Kerala, India

Velappaya is a village in Thrissur district in the state of Kerala, India. It is famous for the Shiva temple, also known as Velappaya Mahadeva temple.

Velappaya is 2 kilometres from the Thrissur–Shornur road. It can also be reached through Mundur (5 km from the left of Guruvayoor-Thrissur road). Kerala University of Health sciences (Medical University) is located mostly in Velappaya area. Velappaya is in Avanoor Panchayath area.

== Other information ==
Velappaya is a village in Thrissur district, very near to the Kerala University of Health and Allied sciences( Medical university). Its a beautiful place and have been famous for the Lord Mahadeva Temple. Velappaya is in Avanoor Panchayath, the Panchayath office being situated in Velappaya.School, hospital, supermarket, medical shop, auditorium and hostels are available. Transportation services to town are very frequent. Nearby train station s Mulangunnathukavu. Location:- 12 km from the Thrissur town, 5 km from mundur, 1.5 km from medical university
