= Padanayarkulangara Mahadeva Temple =

Historic Hindu temple in Kerala, India

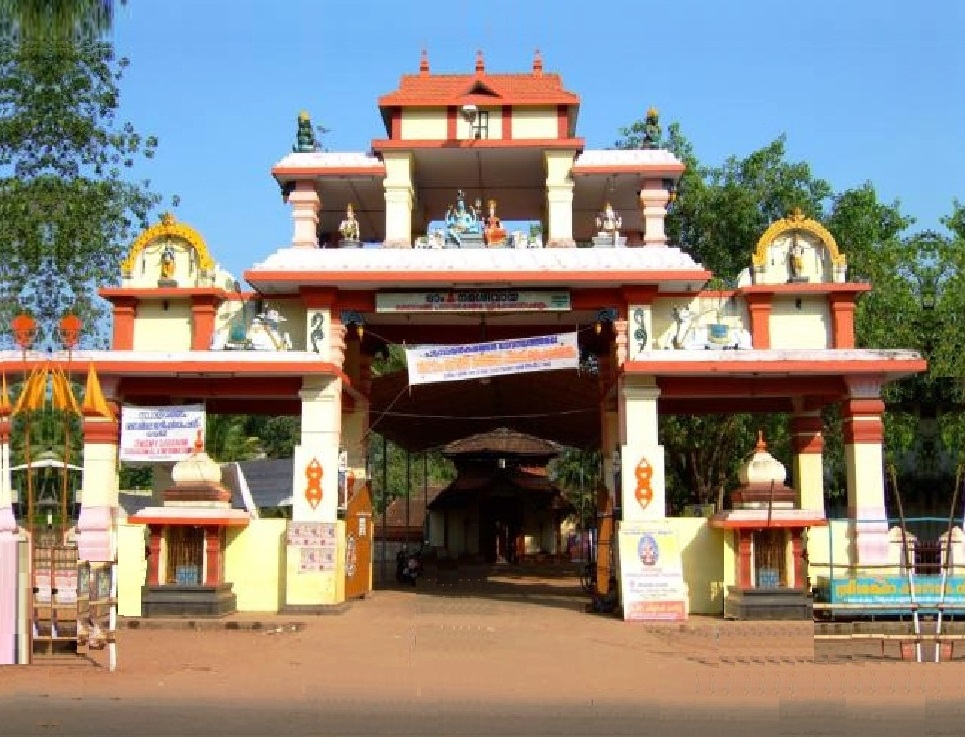
- Temple Gopuram

- Padanayarkulangara Mahadeva Temple, Karunagapally, Kollam, Kerala

Religion
- Affiliation: Hinduism
- District: Kollam
- Deity: Shiva
- Festival: Maha Shivaratri

Location
- Location: Karunagapally
- State: Kerala
- Country: India
- Coordinates: 9°03′20.7″N 76°32′10.2″E

Architecture
- Type: Kerala style
- Completed: Not known

Specifications
- Temple: One
- Monument: 1
- Elevation: 28.95 m (95 ft)

Padanayarkulangara Mahadeva Temple (Malayalam: പടനായർകുളങ്ങര മഹാദേവക്ഷേത്രം) is an ancient Hindu temple dedicated to Lord Shiva. It is situated on the banks of the Pallikkal River at Karunagappally town of Kollam District in the Indian state of Kerala state. The temple is one of the 108 Shiva temples in Kerala.

The temple is located on National Highway-47 in Karunagappally town.

== Myth ==
Many legends tell about Karunagappally Padaanayarkulangara Mahadeva Temple. Prominent among these are:

Shiva and Krishna were going through this passageway. They were tired of walking and reached this Karunagappally which was formerly forested. Lord Krishna was sent to find the best place to stay. Lord Krishna invented the place, but established himself there given its beauty. Mahadevan was waiting for a long time and was sent to find the place. After searching a long time, Lord Shiva found that Krishna was sitting in a beautiful place and sat next to him.

== History ==
Karunagappally was a part of the Ay dynasty and later became part of Odanad and then Travancore. The headquarters of the Kayamkulam kings was in Karunagappally for some time. A Buddha statue dated to the 9th century was recovered from Marathurkulangara in Taluk. The renowned elephant Karunagappally Mahadevan who died in 2007 belonged to this temple.
