= Sree Perunthatta Siva Temple =

Hindu temple in Kerala, India

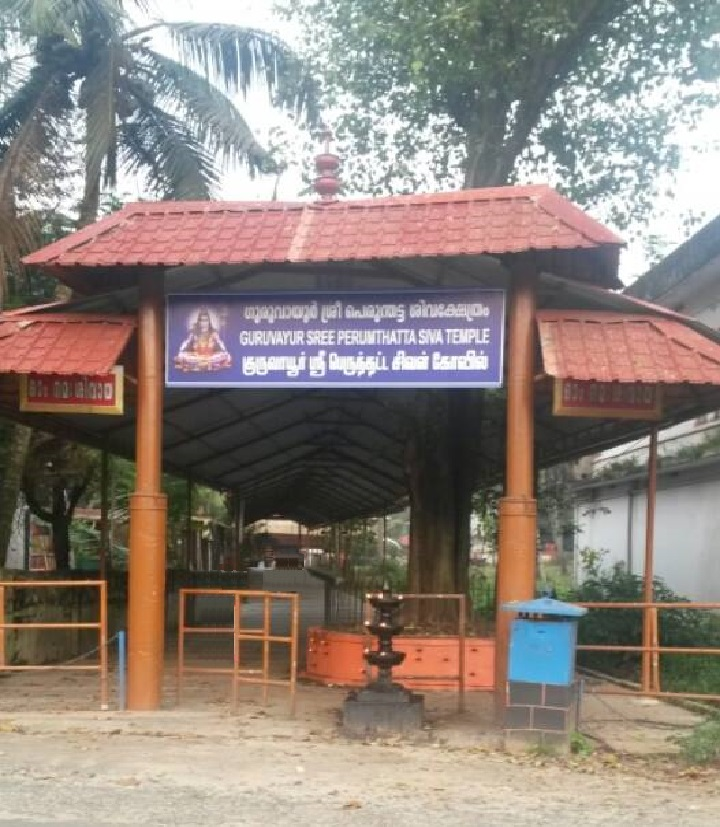
- Temple entrance

- Sree Perunthatta Siva Temple, Guruvayur, Thrissur, Kerala

Religion
- Affiliation: Hinduism
- District: Thrissur
- Deity: Shiva
- Festival: Maha Shivaratri

Location
- Location: Guruvayur
- State: Kerala
- Country: India
- Interactive map of Sree Perunthatta Siva Temple
- Coordinates: 10.586063°N 76.038755°E

Architecture
- Type: Kerala style

Specifications
- Temple: One
- Monument: 1
- Elevation: 26.7 m (88 ft)

Sree Perunthatta Siva Temple (Malayalam: ശ്രീ പെരുന്തട്ട ശിവ ക്ഷേത്രം) is an ancient Hindu temple dedicated to Lord Shiva situated in Guruvayur of Thrissur District in Kerala state in India. According to folklore, sage Parashurama has installed the idol of Lord Shiva in the Treta Yuga. The temple is a part of the 108 famous Shiva temples in Kerala. Therefore, the Saiva-Vaishnava glow is a holy abode.

== History ==
This centuries old Shiva temple was under the direct rule of the Zamorin of Calicut. Bhaktasiromani Sundaramurthy Nayanar has written about this temple in the ancient Tamil script, Tirukova. It is one of the great temples that were destroyed during the Tipu's campaign. It is said that the devotees returned to Ambalapuzha with the idol of Guruvayoorappan just before thistemple was destroyed. Perundatta Mahadeva Temple is located on the south western side of the Guruvayur Temple. Many stone inscriptions are found in the temple complex. Recently, excavations from the temple have uncovered evidence that the Zamorin's forces tried to defend Tipu. When excavating the temple, two large cannons were found. The history of these two cannons dates back to the 18th century. The palace of the Zamorin Raja is located near the Perundatta temple at western side.

== Temple, Architecture ==
This is one of the oldest temples of Thrissur district and centuries old in Cochin kingdom. The temple is located in the Guruvayur town, south-western side of the Guruvayur temple. The temple is built like a maha temple. The Sanctum Sanctorum is double storey with its proportions it shows the Kerala temple architectural style. The Sanctum Sanctorum is tile roofed with rectangular shape. Perunthatta temple has about 2 acres of land. It has built a large edifice around it. The village can be seen on all four sides of temple.

== Sub Deities ==
- Ganapathy
- Vishnu
- Subrahmanyan
- Durga
- Nagaraja
- Sastha
- Rakshas
