= Perumpuzha =

- Town
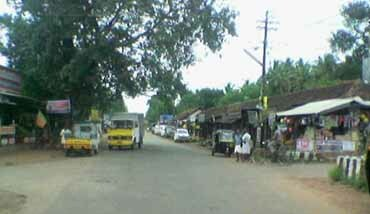
- Interactive map of Perumpuzha
- Coordinates: 8°56′25″N 76°40′45″E
- Country: India
- State: Kerala
- District: Kollam

Languages
  - Official: Malayalam, English
- Time zone: UTC+5:30 (IST)
- PIN: 691504
- Telephone code: 0474
- Vehicle registration: KL-02
- Coastline: 0 kilometres (0 mi)
- Nearest city: Kollam City (16 km)
- Lok Sabha constituency: Kollam
- Climate: Tropical monsoon (Köppen)
- Avg. summer temperature: 37 °C (99 °F)
- Avg. winter temperature: 20 °C (68 °F)
- Website: www.perumpuzha.com

Perumpuzha is a small suburban town in Kollam district of Kerala, India. The junction is the meeting place of Kottiyam-Kundara & Kollam-Veliyam roads. The distance from the district headquarters Kollam is about 16 km.

== Location ==
The roads from junction towards south is to Kureepally, west Punukannoor, north Kundara & towards east Nallila.

== History ==
Kundara, the nearest town is famous in history, as it was from here that Veluthampi Dalawa issued the famous Kundara Vilambaram in 1809. Large deposits of China Clay discovered here helped in the establishment of the Government Ceramics concerns. The Aluminium Industries (ALIND), Kundara is one of the leading Indian firms manufacturing aluminium cables. Kerala Electricals and Allied Engineering Company are also located in Kundara.

== Education ==
1. Govt. LP School, Perumpuzha 2. MGUPS, Perumpuzha 3. SN Public School 4. Noble Public School 5. Gurudeva Central School

== Assisi Atonement Hospital ==
The Assisi Atonement Hospital was started in 1967 by Fr. Culburt OFM Cap at Perumpuzha, Kollam district, Kerala. On 1971 Benedict Mar Gregorious, Archbishop of Trivandrum, blessed the hospital. It was registered under the Travancore Cochin Literacy Scientific and Charitable Societies Registration Act 1955 on 1 November 1989. As of 2014 it was run by The Congregation of Sisters of Imitation of Christ (Bethany Sisters).
