= Sree Mannoor Siva Kshetram Malappuram =

Hindu temple in Kerala, India

Sree Mannur Siva Temple (Malayalam: ശ്രീ മണ്ണൂര്‍ ശിവ ക്ഷേത്രം) is a Hindu temple dedicated to Shiva located in Mullapalli Chaliyam Road, Kadalundi-673328, Calicut at Kerala, India. It is one of the 108 Shiva temples built by Parasurama and the structure of it is like 'Gajaprashta' (the back of an elephant). Mannur Siva kshethram became a center for devotees in the village.
