= Velorvattom =

- Interactive map of Velorvattom

Velorvattom(വേളോർവട്ടം) is a place near Cherthala, Kerala State, India.

The place is famous for a temple "Velorvattom Maha deva temple", worshipping lord Shiva. The temple has two "nada" (entries) which is rare in Kerala. The temple was owned by "Azhvanchery Thamprakkal" and now running by Kerala Urazma Devasam Board (KUDB). It is believed that the temple was created by Vilwamangalam Swami, around 700 years ago.
