= Annamanada =

Annamanada Annamanta
- Village/Town
- Nickname: Annanta
- Location in Kerala, India
- Coordinates: 10.24°N 76.33°E
- Country: India
- State: Kerala
- District: Thrissur(Trichur / Trissur)

Government
  - Body: Annamanada Grama Panchayath, Kadukutty Grama Panchayath

Languages
  - Official: Malayalam, English
- Time zone: UTC+5:30 (IST)
- PIN: 680741
- Telephone code: +91480
- Vehicle registration: KL-64

Annamanada is a village in southern Thrissur district in the Indian state of Kerala, 8 km from Mala.
