= Nalpathaneeswaram Sree Mahadeva Temple =

Hindu temple in Kerala, India

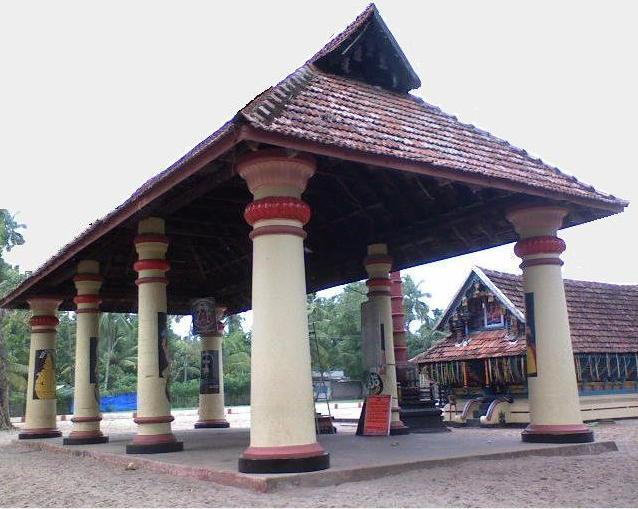
- Main Temple Structure

- Nalpathaneeswaram Sree Mahadeva Temple, Panavally, Alappuzha, Kerala

Religion
- Affiliation: Hinduism
- District: Alappuzha
- Deity: Shiva
- Festival: Maha Shivaratri

Location
- Location: Panavally
- State: Kerala
- Country: India
- Interactive map of Nalpathaneeswaram Sree Mahadeva Temple
- Coordinates: 9.815813°N 76.342250°E

Architecture
- Type: Kerala style
- Creator: Unknown
- Completed: Not known (believed to be thousands of years old)

Specifications
- Temple: One
- Monument: 1

Nalppathenneeswaram Sree Mahadeva Temple is a Mahadevar temple situated in Nalppathenneswaram, in Panavally village of Cherthala taluk in Alleppy district of Kerala state; this place is 20 kilometers from Cherthala and 11 kilometers from Aroor on the Cherthala Arookutty bus route.

Here Lord Siva is in Kiratha Bhava. It is considered the 48th foundlings of Saint Khara, one who founds the Ettumanur temple and Kaduthuruthi temple. The temple is artistically constructed in a quiet, village atmosphere. The festival in this temple is celebrated in the month of Kumbham February–March, uthrittathi-kodiyettu, thiruvathira -aarattu), and lasts for seven days, All those days are important according to the traditional rituals, (Utsavabali, Koodi ezhunnallathu, Bharani, Karthika, Araattu). People refer the God in this temple as "Nalppathenneswarathappan".

Other deities are, Lord Ganapathi, Varahamoorthy, Durgadevi, Rakshassu, Chovva bhagavathi, Nagaraja, Nagayakshi, Ayyappa. This temple has one sister temple called Oorali Parambathu Sastha Temple situated on the north-west side of the temple. Recently performed devaprasana led by late legend Sri Chorodu Narayanappanicker and his team found that, the temple is more than 1000 years old, deity likes arts performance, annadanam, etc.

The temple is under the administration of three ancient Kaimal families named Kozhisseril, Payippattu, Mullakkeril. This is one of the oldest temples still proceeding under Raja Sassana Chepped. Main offering to the deity is kathakali. Because of this, temple is famous for kathakali. Much history surrounded the temple premises, according to the old people this place was known as Pandavar Veli, later it became Panavally. Still there are four big stones that were kept 1 km east of the temple people believe that these stones were used by pandavas during vanavasam for heating milk.

== See also ==
- Temples of Kerala
- 108Siva temples
