= Velloor =

- Village
- Location in Kerala, India Velloor (India)
- Coordinates: 9°49′45″N 76°27′18″E
- Country: India
- State: Kerala
- District: Kottayam
- Taluk: Vaikom
- Time zone: UTC+5:30 (IST)
- PIN: 686609
- Telephone code: 04829
- Vehicle registration: KL-36
- Nearest Town: Thalayolaparambu
- Lok Sabha constituency: Kottayam
- Vidhan Sabha constituency: Vaikom
- Literacy: 99%
- Climate: Moderate (Köppen)

Velloor (also known as Mevelloor) is a village in the Vaikom Taluk of the Kottayam district in Kerala, India.

== Industries ==
There are four large and medium scale industries functioning in the panchayath. The only central public sector undertaking in the panchayat is the Hindustan Newsprint Limited, which is engaged in the production of newsprint. The main private sector company in the area is Cochin Cements Limited manufacturers of ACC Cements. These two companies provide employment to a large no of locals.
