= Ashtamirohini =

1975 film

- Poster
- Directed by: A. B. Raj
- Screenplay by: Sreekumaran Thampi
- Produced by: Hassan Rasheed
- Starring: Prem Nazir; KPAC Lalitha; Manavalan Joseph; Unnimary
- Cinematography: T. N. Krishnankutty Nair
- Edited by: K. Sankunni
- Music by: M. K. Arjunan
- Production company: HR Films
- Release date: 7 November 1975
- Country: India
- Language: Malayalam

Ashtamirohini is a 1975 Indian Malayalam-language film, directed by A. B. Raj. The film stars Prem Nazir, KPAC Lalitha, Manavalan Joseph and Unnimary in the lead roles. It is a remake of the Tamil film Petralthan Pillaiya.

== Cast ==
- Prem Nazir
- KPAC Lalitha
- Manavalan Joseph
- Unnimary
- Bahadoor
- K. P. Ummer
- Master Raghu
- Pushpa

== Soundtrack ==
The music was composed by M. K. Arjunan, with lyrics by Sreekumaran Thampi.

Song	Singers
"Angaadikkavalayil"	K. J. Yesudas, P. Susheela
"Kulukkikkuthu"	K. J. Yesudas
"Navarathna Pedakam"	S. Janaki
"Raariram Paadunnu"	K. J. Yesudas
"Raariram Paadunnu"	P. Susheela
