= List of Hindu temples in Kerala =

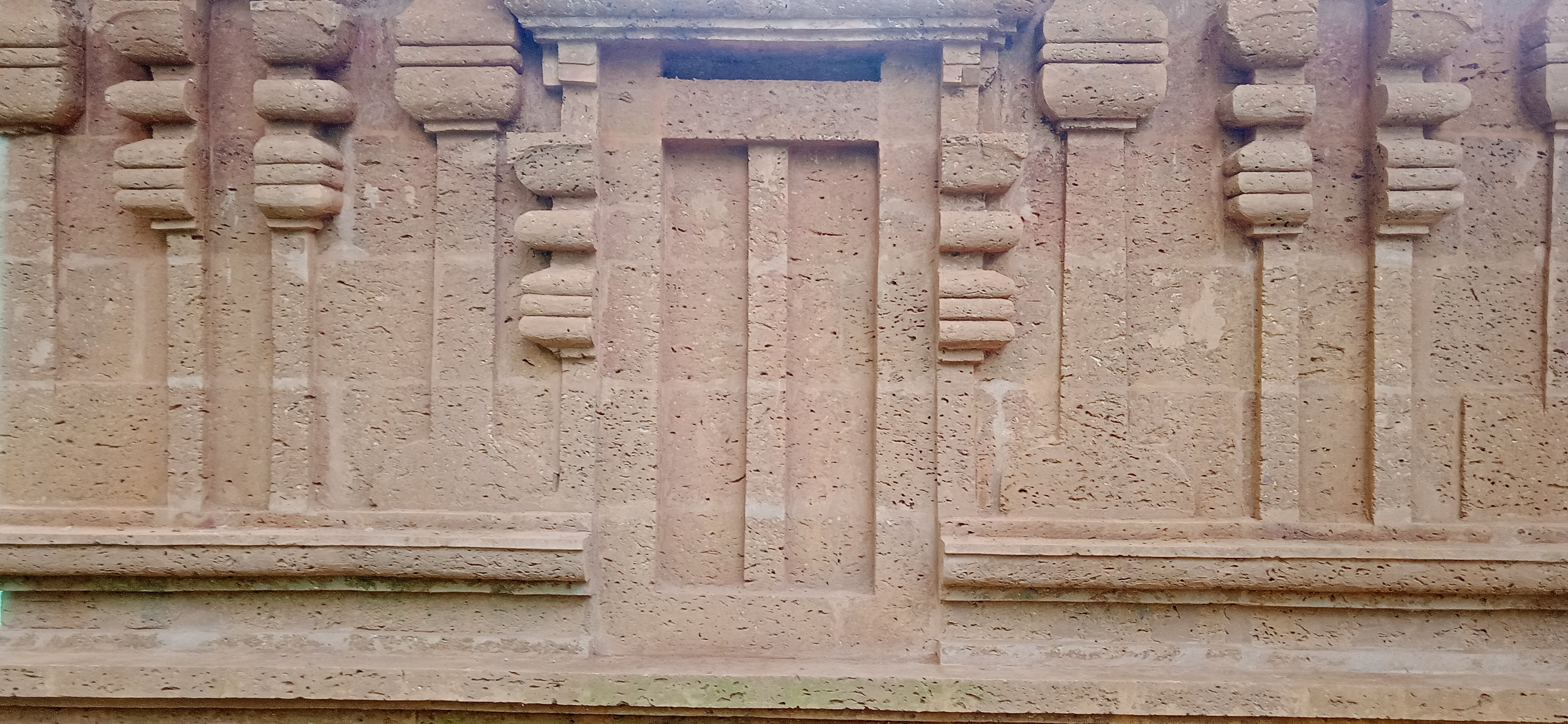
Traditional Kerala Temple Architecture

Districtwise Hindu temples in Kerala include:

== Alappuzha ==
Temples	Location	Deity	Image
Karthyayani Devi Temple, Cherthala	Cherthala	Durga	
Vadakkan Koyikkal Devi Temple Puthiyavila	Puthiyavila, Kayamkulam	Sree Parvathy	
Manakkattu Devi Temple	Pallipad, Haripad, Alappuzha Dist	Bhuvaneswari	
Chakkulathukavu Temple	Neerattupuram	Durga	
Chettikulangara Devi Temple	Mavelikkara	Bhagavathy	
Cheriyanad Sree Balasubrahmanya Swami Temple	Cheriyanad, Chengannur	Subramanian	
Sree Narayanapuram Thrikkayil Temple	Perissery	Vishnu	
Padanilam Parabrahma Temple	Padanilam, Mavelikkara	Parabrahma	
Chengannur Mahadeva Temple	Chengannur	Shiva, Parvathi	
Kandiyoor Sree Mahadeva Temple	Mavelikkara	Shiva	
Anandeshwaram Mahadeva Temple	Pandanad, Chengannur	Shiva	
Haripad Sree Subrahmanya Swamy Temple	Haripad	Subrahmanya Swamy	
Mannarasala Temple	Haripad	Nagaraja & Nagayakshi	
Ambalappuzha Sri Krishna Temple	Ambalapuzha	Krishna	
Vethalan Kavu Mahadeva Temple	Kappil East, Krishnapuram, Alappuzha, Kayamkulam	Shiva	
Evoor Major Sri Krishnaswamy Temple	Evoor, Haripad	Krishna	
Vettikulangara Devi Temple Cheppad	Cheppad, Haripad	Durga	
Adichikkavu Sree Durga Devi Kshetram	Pandanad, Chengannur	Durga	
Kavil Sri Bhadrakali Temple	Karumadi, Alappuzha	Bhadrakali	

== Ernakulam ==
Temples	Location	Deity	Image
Cochin Thirumala Devaswom	Kochi	Venkateshwara	
Chottanikkara Temple	Chottanikkara	Maha Lakshmi and Maha Vishnu	
Ernakulathappan Temple	Ernakulam	Shiva, Ganesha, Parvati	
Sree Poornathrayeesa Temple	Tripunithura	Vishnu in the form of Santhana Gopala Moorthy	
Thamaramkulangara Sree Dharma Sastha Temple	Tripunithura	Ayyappan in the form of Dharma Sastha	
Thrikkakara Vamanamoorthy Temple	Thrikkakkara	Vamana	
Thiru Nayathode Siva Narayana Temple	Nayathod	Shiva	
Makaliyam Sreeramaswamy Temple	Irumpanam	Rama	
Chittoor Sree Krishnaswamy Temple	South Chittoor	Krishna	
Cheranalloor Shiva Temple	Cheranallur	Shiva	
Maramkulangara Krishna Temple	Eroor	Krishna	
Dakshina Mookambika Temple	North Paravur	Saraswati	
Puthoorppilly Sree Krishnaswamy Temple	Manjapra	Krishna	
Thirumoozhikkulam Lakshmana Perumal Temple	Moozhikkulam	Lakshmana	
Pazhoor Perumthrikkovil	Piravom	Shiva	
Thiruvaloor Mahadeva temple	Alangad	Shiva	
Sree Balakrishna Swami Temple	Kuzhuppilly	Krishna as Bala Krishna	
Eravikulangara Bhagavathy Temple	Akaparambu	Shiva, Ayyappan	
Cherai Gowreeshwara Temple	Cherai	Subrahmanya	
Sree Vasudevapuram Mahavishnu Temple	South Aduvassery	Mahavishnu	
Puthencavu Bhagavathy Temple	Elavoor	Bhadrakali	

== Idukki ==
Temples	Location	Deity	Image
Sri Siddhi Vinayakar Temple, Chittampara	Chittampara	Ganesha	
Sree Krishna Swami Temple, Thodupuzha	Thodupuzha	Shree Krishna	
Kanjiramattam Sree Mahadeva Temple	Kanjiramattam	Lord Shiva	
Uravappara Temple	Olamattom, Thodupuzha	Lord Subhramanya	
Karikkode Bhagavathy Temple	Karikkode	Bagavathi	

== Kannur ==
Temples	Location	Deity	Image
Rajarajeshwara Temple	Taliparamba	Shiva	
Kottiyoor Temple	Kottiyoor	Shiva	
Thiruvangad Sree Ramaswami Temple	Thalassery	Rama	
Muthappan Temple	Parassini	Muthappan	
Trichambaram Temple	Taliparamba	Krishna	
Mridanga Saileswari Temple	Muzhakunnu	Shri Porkkali	
Sree Andalurkavu	Thalassery	Daivathar (Worshiped as Rama) and Vettakkorumakan	
Vadeshwaram Temple	Aroli	Shiva	
Oorpazhachi Kavu	Edakkad	Oorpazhachi Daivathar, Vettakkorumakan and Bhagavathi	
Kalarivathukkal Bhagavathy Temple	Valapattanam	Bhadrakali	
Annapurneshwari Temple, Cherukunnu	Cherukunnu, Kannapuram	Annapoorneshwari, Krishna	
Madayi Kavu	Madayi	Bhadrakali	
Kunnathoor Padi	Sahyadri Mountains	Muthappan	
Jagannath Temple, Thalassery	Thalassery	Shiva	
Sree Sundareswara Temple	Talap	Shiva	
Madai Vadukunda Shiva Temple	Madayi	Shiva	
Sri Lakshmi Narasimha Temple, Thalassery	Thalassery	Narasimha, Lakshmi	
Kadachira Sri Thrikkapalam Siva Temple	Kadachira	Shiva	
Cheruthazham Sree Kunninmathilakam Mahadeva Temple	Cheruthazham	Shiva	
Karivellur Mahadeva Temple	Karivellur	Shiva	
Kapalikulangara Sree Mahavishnu Temple	Taliparamba	Mahavishnu	

== Kasaragod ==
Temples	Location	Deity	Image
Ananthapura Lake Temple	Ananthapura	Lord Mahavishnu	
Madhur Temple	Madhur	Ganesha	
Sree Madiyan Koolom Temple	Kanhangad	Eeshwaran	
Sri Lakshmi Venkatesh Temple	Kanhangad	Vishnu	
Kanipura Sri Gopalakrishna Temple	Kumbla	Krishna	
Nileshwar Muthappan Madappura	Nileshwaram	Muthappan	
Altharakkal Sree Muthappan Madapura	Kanhangad	Muthappan	
Mayathi Devi Temple	Balanthode, Panathady	Devi	
Kanila Shree Bhagavathi Temple	Manjeshwaram	Baghavathi	
Sree Chakrapani Temple	Thrikaripur	Vishnu	

== Kollam ==
Temples	Location	Deity	Image
Achankovil Sastha Temple	Achankovil	Sastha	
Aryankavu Sastha Temple	Aryankavu	Sastha	
Changankulangara Mahadeva Temple	Changankulangara	Mahadeva	
Kulathupuzha Sastha Temple	Kulathupuzha	Sastha	
Sasthamcotta Sree Dharma Sastha Temple	Sasthamkotta	Sastha	
Kadakkal Devi Temple	Kadakkal	Bhadrakali	
Kilimarathukavu Temple	Kadakkal	Shiva, Parvathi	
Poruvazhy Peruviruthy Malanada Temple	Poruvazhy	Duryodhana	
Chathannoor Sree Bhoothanatha Temple	Chathannoor		
Puttingal Temple	Paravur	Puttingal Goddess	
Pulimukham Devi Temple	Thazhava	Bhadrakali	
Vayalil Thrikkovil Mahavishnu Temple	Ilamkulam, Kalluvathukkal	Vishnu	
Ammachiveedu Murti Temple	Tangasseri	Adi Parashakti	
Oachira Temple	Oachira	Parabrahman	
Kottarakkara Sree Mahaganapathi Kshethram	Kottarakkara	Siva Ganesha	
Sree Indilayappan Temple	Marayikkodu, Karickom	Shiva, Parvathi, Vishnu	

== Kottayam ==
Temples	Place	Deity	Image
Ettumanoor Mahadevar Temple	Ettumanoor	Lord Siva	
Thirunakkara Mahadevar Temple	Kottayam	Lord Siva	
Vaikom Mahadevar Temple	Vaikom	Lord Siva	
Vazhappally Maha Siva Temple	Changanassery	Lord Siva	
Thrikodithanam Mahavishnu Temple	Changanassery	Adbhutha Narayanan, Narasimha	
Kaduthuruthy Mahadeva Temple	Kaduthuruthi	Lord Siva	
Kumaranalloor Devi Temple	Kumaranalloor	Bhagavathi	
Neendoor Subrahmanya Swami Temple	Neendoor, Kottayam	Lord Subramaniya	
Shaktheeswaram Temple	Aymanam, Kottayam	Adi Parashakti	
Kavinpuram Devi Temple	Ezhacherry	Shiva, Parvathy	
Panachikkadu Temple	Panachikkadu	Saraswati, Vishnu	
Pattupurackal bhagavathy temple kattampack	Njeezhoor, Kottayam	Bhadrakali	
Perunna Subrahmanya Swami Temple	Perunna, Changanacherry	Subrahmanya Swami (Kartikeya)	
Ramapuram Sree Rama Temple	Ramapuram	Sree Rama	
Elamgulam Sree Dharma Shastha Temple	Elamgulam	Ayyappa	

== Kozhikode ==
Temples	Location	Deity	Image
Abhimanyu Temple	Kuttiady	Abhimanyu	
Lokanarkavu Temple	Vatakara	Durga	
Pisharikavu Temple	Koyilandy	Durga	
Tali Shiva Temple	Kozhikode	Shiva	
Thalikkunu Shiva Temple	Mankavu, Kozhikode	Shiva	
Valayanad Devi Temple	Govindapuram, Kozhikode	Bhagavathi	
Varakkal Devi Temple	West Hill, Kozhikode	Durga	
Subramanya Swamy Temple	Polur, Kuruvattur, Kozhikode	Sree Subramanya Swami	

== Malappuram ==
Temples	Location	Deity	Image
Thirumandhamkunnu Temple	Thirumanthamkunnu, Angadippuram	Bhagavathi	
Alattiyur Hanuman Temple	Alathiyur, Tirur	Hanuman	
Bhayankavu Bhagavathi Temple	Purathur, Tirur	Bhagavathi	
Thrikkavu Temple	Ponnani	Durga	
Thirunavaya Navamukunda Temple	Tirunavaya, Tirur	Navamukunda, Lakshmi	
Kadampuzha Devi Temple	Kadampuzha, Tirur	Durga	
Triprangode Siva Temple	Triprangode, Tirur	Shiva	
Vairankode Bhagavathy Temple	Vairankode, Tirur	Bhagavathi	
Keraladeshpuram Temple	Tanur	Vishnu	
Vettakkorumakan Temple	Nilambur Kovilakam, Nilambur	Son of Shiva	

== Palakkad ==
Temples	Location	Deity	Image
Meenkulathi Temple	Pallassena	Bhagavati	
Manapullikavu Temple	East Yakara, Palakkad	Bhagavati	
Pariyanampatta Bhagavathi Temple	Pariyanampatta	Bhagavati	
Viswanatha Swamy Temple, Palakkad	Kalpathy, Palakkad	Shiva	
Killikkurussi Mahadeva Temple	Killikkurussi	Shiva	
Chinakkathoor Temple	Palappuram, Ottapalam	Bhagavati	
Karimpuzha Sree Ramaswamy Temple	Karimpuzha	Sree Rama	
Mangottu Bhagavathi Temple	Athipotta	Bhagavathi	
Panniyur Sri Varahamurthy Temple	Kumbidi	Varaha	
Thirumittakode Anchumoorthi Temple	Thirumittacode	Shiva, Vishnu	
Thrippalur Mahadeva Temple	Alathur	Shiva	
Kodikkunnu Bhagavathy Temple	Pallippuram	Bhagavathi	
Trithala Maha Siva Temple	Thrithala	Shiva	
Chittoorkavu Devi Temple	Chittur	Bhagavati	
Malamakkavu Ayyappa Temple	Anakkara	Ayyappan	
Ootukulangara Bhagavathy Temple	Peruvemba	Bhagavati	
Kodumbu Subramanya Swamy Temple	Kodumba	Subrahmanya	
Vayilyamkunnu Bhagavathi Temple	Kadampazhipuram	Bhagavati	

== Pathanamthitta ==
Temples	Location	Deity	Image
Oorali Appooppan Kavu	Kalleli	Oorali Appooppan	
Malayalappuzha Devi Temple	Malayalapuzha	Devi	
Sabarimala Temple	Sabarimala	Ayyappan	
Valiyakoikkal Temple	Pandalam	Ayyappan	
Aranmula Parthasarathy Temple	Aranmula	lord Krishna	
Kaviyoor Mahadevar Temple	Kaviyoor	Mahadeva	
Thumpamon Vadakkumnatha Temple	Thumpamon-ambalakadavu	Muruga	
Anikkattilammakshethram	Mallappally Anicadu	Shiva Parvathi	
Sreevallabha Temple	Thiruvalla	Sreevallabhan, Sudarshanamoorthy	
Devi Temple	Thiruvalla	Durga	
Thattayil Orippurathu Bhagavathi Temple	Thattayil	Devi	

== Thiruvananthapuram ==
Temples	Location	Deity	Image
Aazhimala Shiva Temple	Pulinkudi	Shiva	
Padiyanoor Devi Temple	Padiyanoor, Poovachal, Kattakada	Chamundi	
Attukal Temple	Attukal	Bhadrakali	
Vellayani Devi Temple	Vellayani	Bhadrakali	
Andoor Kandan Sree Dharma Sastha Temple, Tholady	Tholady	Dharma Sastha	
Palakkavu Bhagavathi temple	Edava, Varkala, Trivandrum	Bhadrakali	
Amunthirathu Devi Temple	Mudakkal, Attingal, Thiruvananthapuram	Sree Bhadra Kali	
Avanavanchery Sri Indilayappan Temple	Avanavanchery, Attingal	Shiva	
Irumkulangara Durga Devi Temple	Manacaud	Durga, Navagraha	
Janardanaswamy Temple	Varkala, Thiruvananthapuram	Vishnu	
O.T.C. Hanuman Temple, Palayam	Palayam	Hanuman	
Kamaleswaram Mahadeva Temple	Kamaleswaram	Shiva	
Karikkakom Devi Temple	Karikkakom	Bhagavathi	
Keleswaram Mahadeva Temple	Keleswaram	Shiva	
Mithrananthapuram Trimurti Temple	Thiruvananthapuram	Brahma, Vishnu, Shiva	
Mukkolakkal Bhagawathi Temple	Mukkolakkal		
Padmanabhaswamy Temple	Thiruvananthapuram	Vishnu	
Pazhaya Sreekanteswaram Temple	Sreekanteswaram	Shiva	
Palkulangara Devi Temple	Palkulangara	Devi	
Karyavattom Dharma Sastha Temple	Karyavattom	Dharma Sastha	
Sarkaradevi Temple	Sarkara, Chirayinkeezhu	Bhadrakali	
Sivagiri	Varkala, Thiruvananthapuram	Saraswathy, Narayana Guru	
Sree Shivashakthi Mahaganapathi Temple	Keezhammakam, Chenkal	Shiva, Parvati and Ganapathy	
Sreekanteswaram	Thiruvananthapuram	Shiva	
Thirupalkadal Sreekrishnaswamy Temple	Keezhperoor	Krishna	
Thiruvallam Sree Parasurama Temple	Thiruvallam	Parashurama	
Venkatachalapathy Temple	Thiruvananthapuram	Vishnu, Garuda	
Gandhari Amman Kovil	Thiruvananthapuram	Gandhari amman, Ganapathi	

== Thrissur ==
Temples	Location	Deity	Image
Ammathiruvadi Temple	Urakam	Durga	
Arattupuzha Temple	Arattupuzha	Vasishtha	
Avanangattilkalari Vishnumaya Temple	Peringottukara	Vishnumaya	
Chowalloor Siva Temple	Guruvayur	Shiva	
Guruvayur Temple	Guruvayur	Sri Krishna	
Kanadikavu Shree Vishnumaya Kuttichathan Swamy temple	Peringottukara	Vishnumaya	
Kodungallur Bhagavathy Temple	Kodungallur	Bhagavathi	
Koodalmanikyam Temple	Irinjalakuda	Bharata	
Kuttumuck Siva Temple	Thrissur	Mahadeva	
Mammiyoor Temple	Mammiyoor	Shiva	
Mathur Shiva Temple	Kunnamkulam	Shiva	
Mundayur Mahadeva Temple	Anjur	Shiva	
Paramekkavu Bagavathi Temple	Thrissur	Bhagavathi	
Payammal Shatrughna Temple	Irinjalakuda	Shatrughna	
Poonkunnam Siva Temple	Punkunnam, Thrissur	Shiva	
Thanikkudam Bhagavathi Temple	Thanikkudam	Bhagavathi	
Thiruvambadi Sri Krishna Temple	Thrissur	Sri Krishna	
Thiruvanchikulam Temple	Kodungallur	Shiva	
Thiruvullakkavu Sree Dharma Sastha Temple	Cherpu	Dharma Sastha	
Thottipal Bhagavati Temple	Thottippal	Bhagavathi	
Thriprayar Temple	Triprayar	Sree Rama	
Trikkur Mahadeva Temple	Trikkur, Thrissur	Shiva	
Vadakkunnathan Temple	Thrissur	Shiva	
Vilwadrinatha Temple	Thiruvilwamala	Rama, Lakshmana	

== Wayanad ==
Temples	Location	Deity	Image
Valliyoorkkavu	Mananthavadi	Durga	
Thirunelli Temple	Thirunelli	Maha Vishnu	
