= Brahmeeswaran Temple =

Hindu temple in Kerala, India

Brahmeeswaran Temple is a Hindu temple in the Palakkad district of Kerala state, South India. It is situated in Karimpuzha village, 25 km from Palakkad town.

The old temple was in an abandoned state for quite some time, till late 2001. A Nair family called "Chalapurathu" whose tharavadu (House) is situated in Karimpuzha came with an offering to Shiva. The Chalapurathu family had renovated the temple, which took almost three years to complete. Businessman Mr B G Menon and famous Malayalam cine artist Mr Ravi Menon, who are members of Chalapurathu family took the lead role in getting the renovation completed.

== See also ==
- Temples of Kerala
