= Karimpuzha =

Karimpuzha may refer to:

- Karimpuzha, Palakkad, a village in Palakkad district, Kerala, India
- Karimpuzha (Malappuram), a river in Kerala
- Karimpuzha Sree Ramaswamy Temple, a Hindu temple located in Ottapalam taluk, Palakkad district.
