= O.T.C. Hanuman Temple, Palayam =

Temple in India

O.T.C. Hanuman Temple
- Location in Kerala

Religion
- Affiliation: Hinduism
- District: Thiruvananthapuram
- Deity: Lord Hanuman

Location
- Location: Palayam
- State: Kerala
- Country: India
- Interactive map of O.T.C. Hanuman Temple
- Coordinates: 8°30′28″N 76°56′59″E

Architecture
- Type: Dravidian architecture (Kovil)

O.T.C. Hanuman Temple is one of the most visited Hanuman temples in Kerala, India. This temple is situated at Palayam in the heart of Thiruvananthapuram, Kerala.

== History of the temple ==
After the reign of Marthanda Varma, the capital of Travancore was shifted from Padmanabhapuram to Thiruvananthapuram. Initially, the headquarters of the Nair Brigade was shifted from the old capital to the new. Then it was shifted to Kollam and later brought back to Thiruvananthapuram. The Nair soldiers brought many of their deities to Thiruvananthapuram. The cavalry of the Nair Brigade brought with them the Ganesha idols of Pazhavangady and Palayam temples, whereas, the cavalry soldiers brought Sri Hanuman to Thiruvananthapuram. Since the temple was originally located with the military camp, the temple is officially referred as O.T.C. (Officers Training Camp) Hanuman Temple.

== Deities in the temple ==
Apart from Hanuman, Lord Siva, Ganapati, Naga devatas and Yogeeswaran also are in the temple.

== Tantri ==
The famous Thazhamon Madhom has Tantram in this temple.

== Administration of the temple ==
The temple is currently administered by the Travancore Devaswom Board.

== See also ==
- List of Hindu temples in Kerala
