= Venkatachalapathy Temple =

Hindu temple in Kerala, India

Sri Venkatachalapathy Temple
- Location in Kerala

Religion
- Affiliation: Hinduism
- Deity: Sri Venkatachalapathy (Vishnu)

Location
- Location: Trivandrum
- State: Kerala
- Country: India
- Coordinates: 8.480391°N 76.942496°E

Architecture
- Completed: 1898

Sri Venkatachalapathy Temple is a temple situated in Trivandrum, Kerala, about a minute walk from the southern gate of Sri Padmanabhaswamy Temple. It is also known as Srinivasar kovil, Perumal Kovil, Iyyengar Kovil or Desikar Sannidhi. The temple was built in 1898. The poojas in Kerala temples are based on the Namboodiri sampradayam, except a few like this.

There is also a temple name Arulmigu Prasanna Venkatachalapathy temple near Thuraiyur in Tiruchi.

== History ==
The deity of this temple is Sri Venkatachalapathy. It is said that one Shri Ranga Iyengar of Veeravanallur saw the idol in a pond near his house around 100 years ago.

The idol was installed by Sree Ranganatha Satagopa Yateendra Mahadesikar, 40th Azhkiya Singar according to the 'Paadmasamhitai' (One among the three Samhitais) of the 'Paancharathra Agamam'. As per the instructions of the Jeer, the eldest son in Shri Ranga Iyengar's family has been the main priest of the temple and has also been in charge of its administration for the last three generations. The daily rituals in the temple are being carried out according to the Vadakalai System.

== Vimanam ==
The temple has no "Gopuram" but has Tamil Nadu roots. The Sreekovil has no complex carvings like Kerala temples, hence it cannot be considered a Kerala temple. Temple terrace (another feature of the Tamil style).

== Sannidhi ==
The temple's main deity in the Garba Gruham is SriVenkatachalapathyPerumal. The sanctum sanctorum houses the idols of Alamelu Mangai Thayar and Padmasini Thayar. There are also shrines for the deities Navaneetha Krishnar (Santhana Gopalan), Peria Thiruvadi, and Garudar.

The temple also has an installation of the idol of Kulasekhara alwar, who ruled over this land many centuries ago. As a mark of respect to the king who was a devout Vaishnavite, a sannidhi has been constructed where along with the idol of Kulasekhara Alwar the idols of Nammalwar, Thirumangai alwar, Bashyakarar (Ramanujar). Are also consecrated Vishwarksenar (is said to be the escort of Sree Venkitachalapathy).

== Darshan, Sevas and festivals ==
Most of the Vaishnava festivals including Vaikunta Ekadasi, Thiru Aadi pooram and Aadi Swathi, Janmashtami, Alwar Thirunakshtram are celebrated. During other national and religious festivals Pongal, Deepavali, Vishu & Onam temple are decorated with lights and flowers.

Desikar was born under the constellation of Sravana in the month of Purattasi of Vibhava year as per the Tamil Almanac. [September - October 1269 AD]. Every year in the month of Purattasi Brahmotsavam is conducted here. The festival starts from 10 days before the Thiruvonam day(Desikar Thirunakshatram). In these days, the Special Abhishekams also done for All Moolavar & Utsavar deities. And in the Evening Vedam and Divya Prabhanda Parayanam conducted here. On these days Perumal goes through the Maada Veethi (this ritual is called as the "perumal purapadu"). The festival ends with Theertha Vaari for Venkatachalapathy Perumal & Vedanta Desikar.

An attractive feature of the festival is the Garuda Vahanam, where the main deity placed on the idol of Garuda is taken out in procession on a richly decorated palanquin that resembles the one on which Lord Vishnu is taken out during the Theerthavari at the Padmanabhaswamy temple. The Garuda Vahanam is taken out on all the Saturdays of the Purattasi month.

In Maargazhi, the important festival of this month is the recital of Thiruppavai. The poems were composed by "AndaaL" an important devotee of Perumal. Next to this comes the Vaikunda ekadasi festival in which perumal used to be seen in Sayana alangaram (Like in Thirup paaRkadal)

== Prasadam ==
Offerings made to the deity include Puliyodarai (Tamarind Rice), Dhadhyodanam (Curd Rice), Pongal, Charkkarai Pongal, ELLodarai (Sesame Rice), Kheer, Amrutha Kalasam and Chakkarai Sundal.

== See also ==
- Temples of Kerala
- List of Hindu temples in Kerala
