= Perunna Subrahmanya Swami Temple =

Hindu temple in Kottayam district, Kerala

- Subramanya Swamy Temple, Perunna, Kottayam, Kerala

Religion
- Affiliation: Hinduism
- District: Kottayam
- Deity: Subramanya Swamy
- Festival: Pallivetta utsavam

Location
- Location: Perunna
- State: Kerala
- Country: India
- Coordinates: 9°25′56.5″N 76°32′20.5″E

Architecture
- Type: Architecture of Kerala

Specifications
- Temple: One
- Elevation: 28.21 m (93 ft)

Website
- https://perunnatemple.com

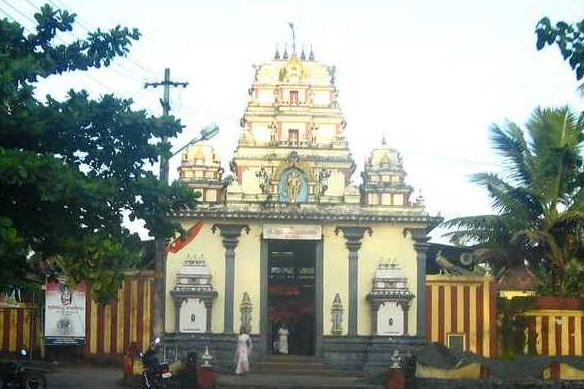
Perunna Subrahmanya Swami Temple

Perunna Subrahmanya Swami Temple is a Hindu temple at Perunna neighbourhood in Changanacherry. The deity of the temple is Subrahmanya Swami (Kartikeya), one of the three sons of Shiva. Krishna, Shiva, Ayyappan, Mahaganapathi (Ganesha), Sarpa Kavu, Rakshasa are other deities in this temple. This temple is known for its 'Pallivetta' utsav.

Mohandas Gandhi during his first visit to Kerala came to the temple and worshipped the Muruga.

== Perunna inscriptions ==
Inscriptions in Vatteshuthu alphabet can be seen at the west gate of the temple. These are believed to be written in the 10th century, during the rule of Kulasekhara Koyiladhikari.

== See also ==
- Temples of Kerala
