= Mathur Shiva Temple =

Shiva temple in Kerala, India

- Mathoor Mahadeva Temple
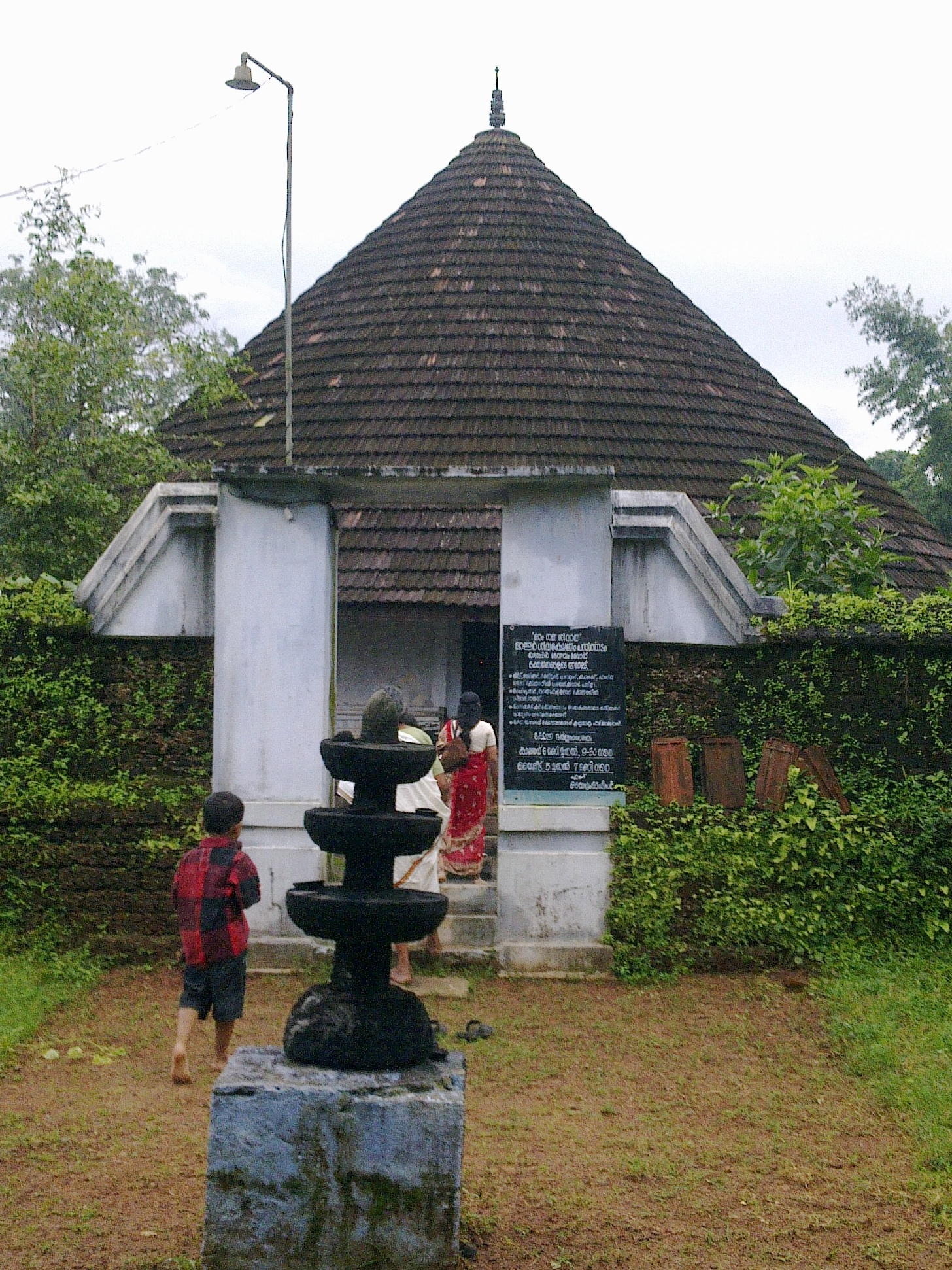

- Mathoor Mahadeva Temple, Kunnamkulam, Thrissur, Kerala

Religion
- Affiliation: Hinduism
- District: Thrissur
- Deity: Shiva
- Festival: Maha Shivaratri

Location
- Location: Kunnamkulam
- State: Kerala
- Country: India
- Interactive map of Mathur Shiva Temple
- Coordinates: 10.6748°N 76.1153°E

Architecture
- Type: Architecture of Kerala

Specifications
- Temple: One
- Elevation: 38.24 m (125 ft)

Mathur Shiva Temple is a Hindu temple located in Kunnamkulam of Thrissur District, Kerala, India. It is believed that the Siva linga is Rudrakshasila which is irregular in shape, red in colour and is untouched by the human sculptor. The presiding deity of the temple is Shiva located in main Sanctum Sanctorum, facing West and Lord Parvathi located in same Sanctum Sanatorium, facing East. According to folklore, sage Parashurama has installed the idol. The temple is a part of the 108 famous Shiva temples in Kerala.

== See also ==
- 108 Shiva Temples
- Temples of Kerala
- Hindu temples in Thrissur Rural

== Temple Photos ==
Various Photos of Pannithadam Mathur Shiva Temple

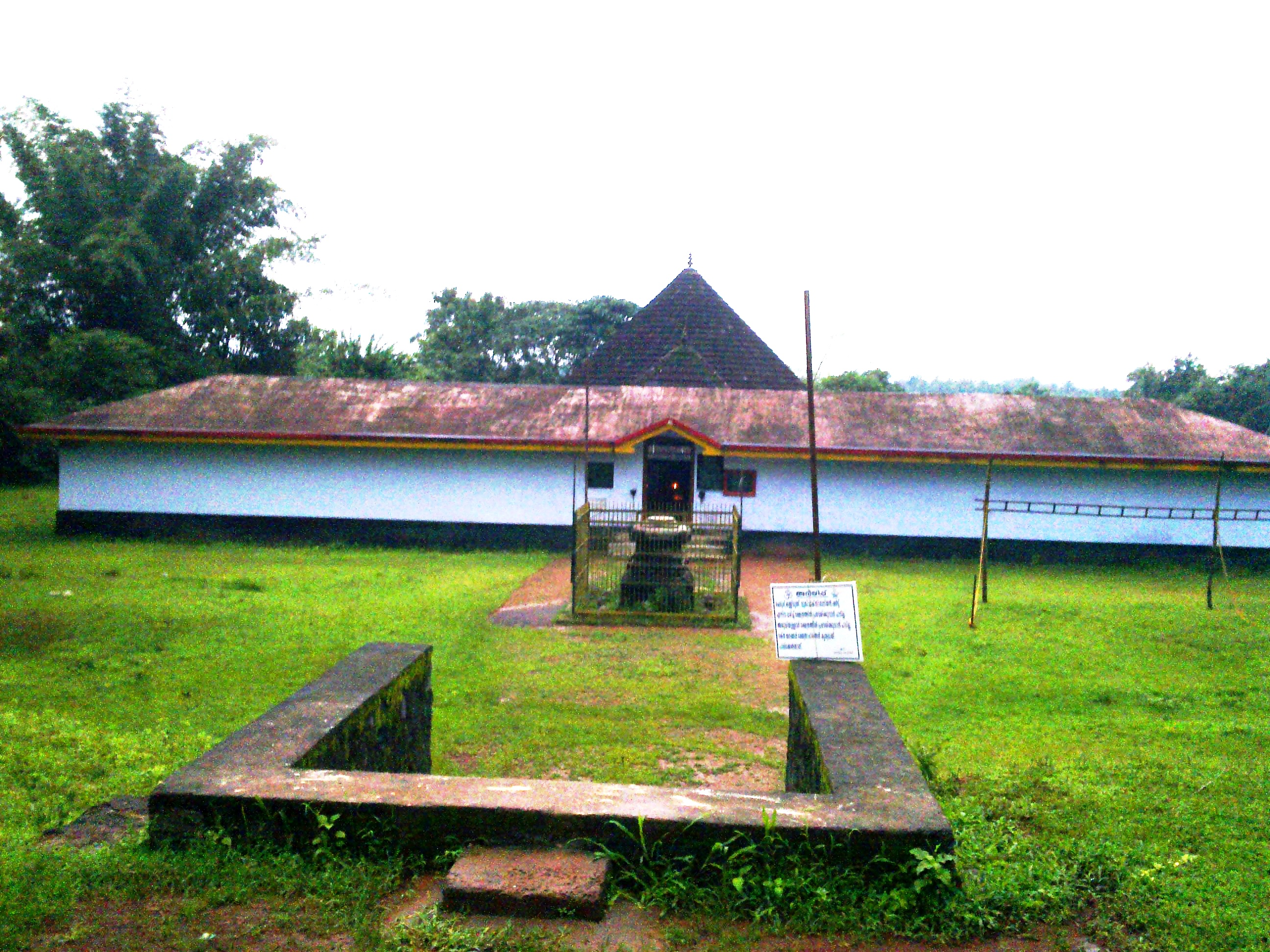
Nalambalam

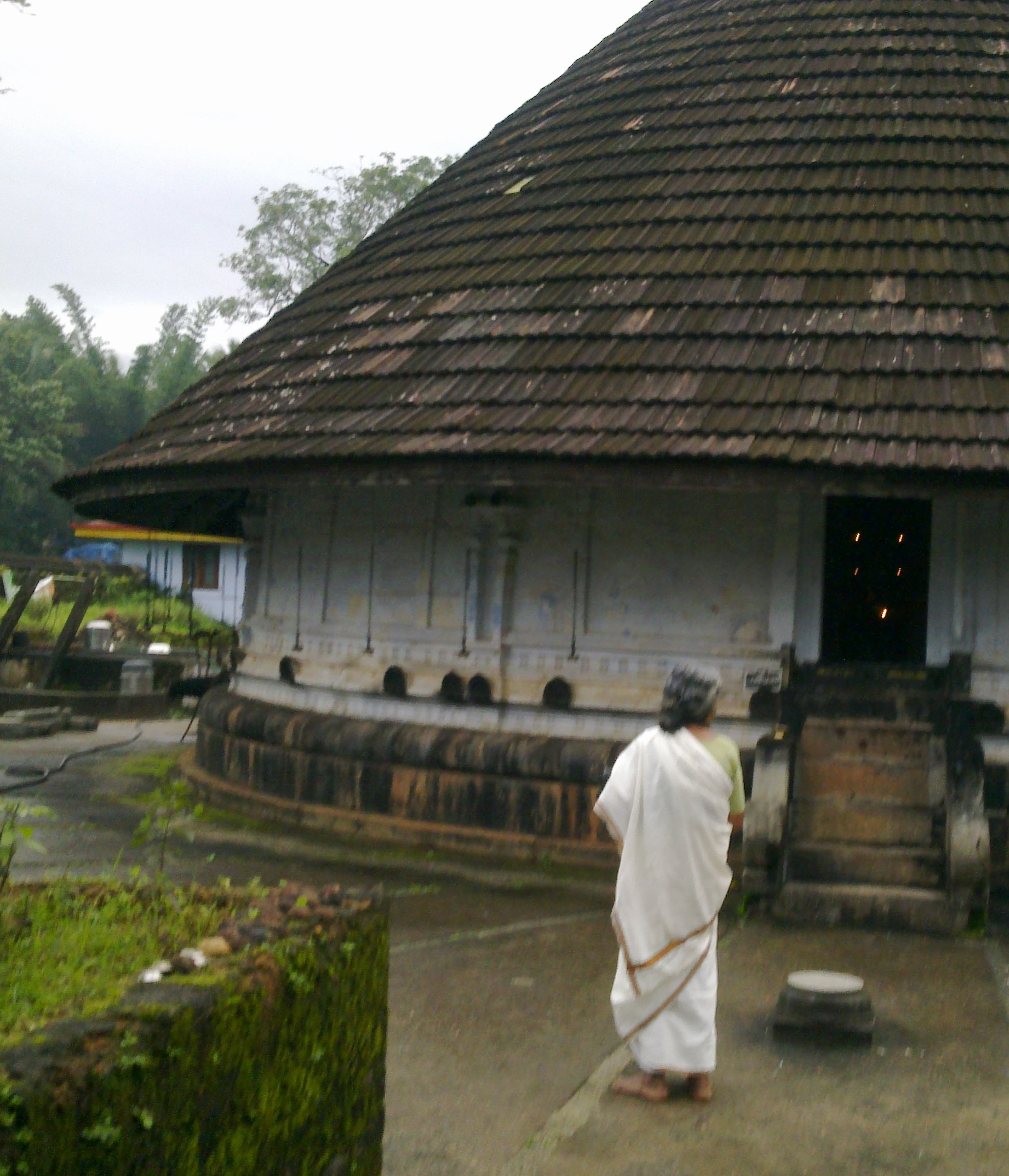
Sanctum Santorium

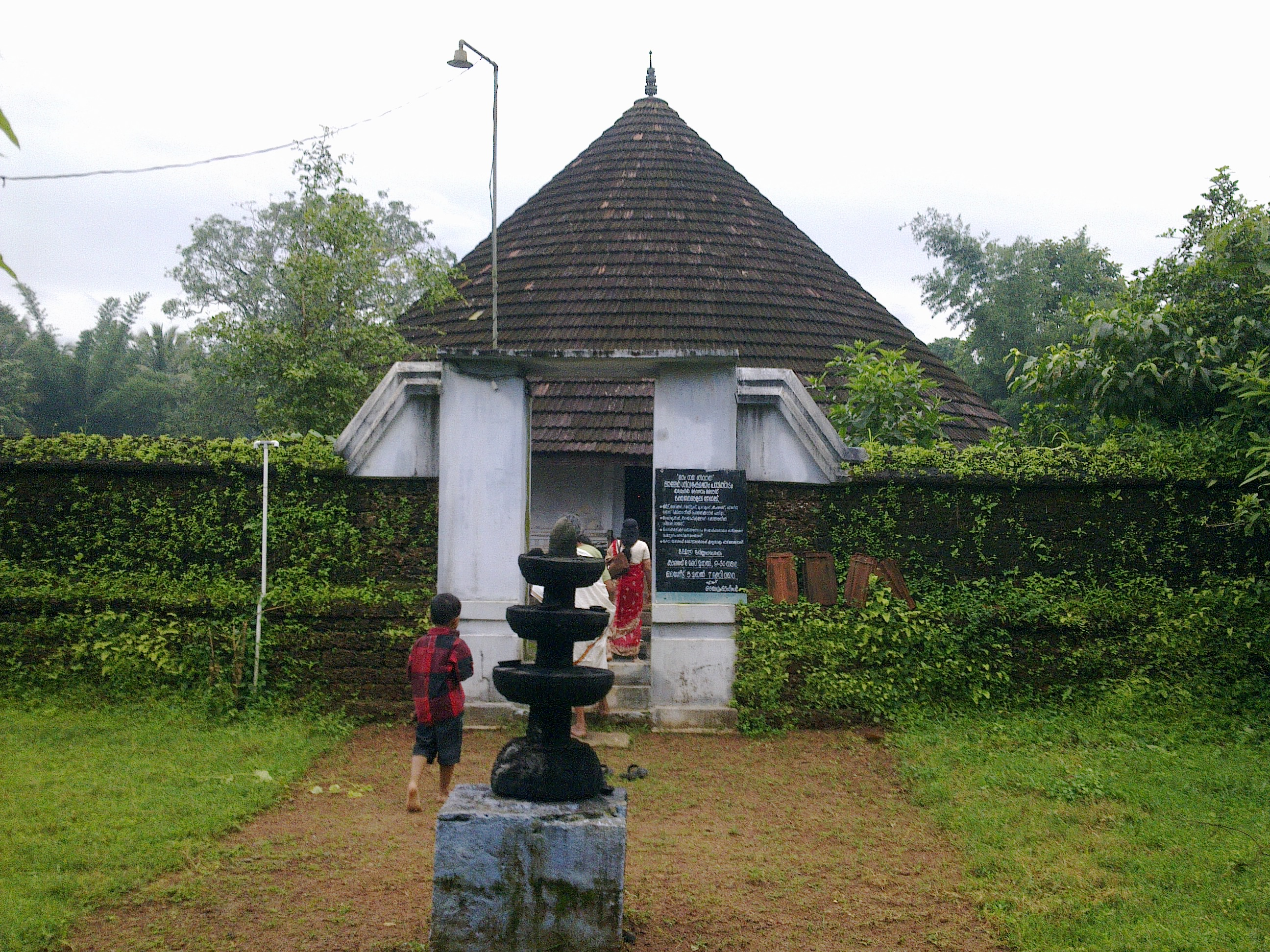
Parvathi Nada

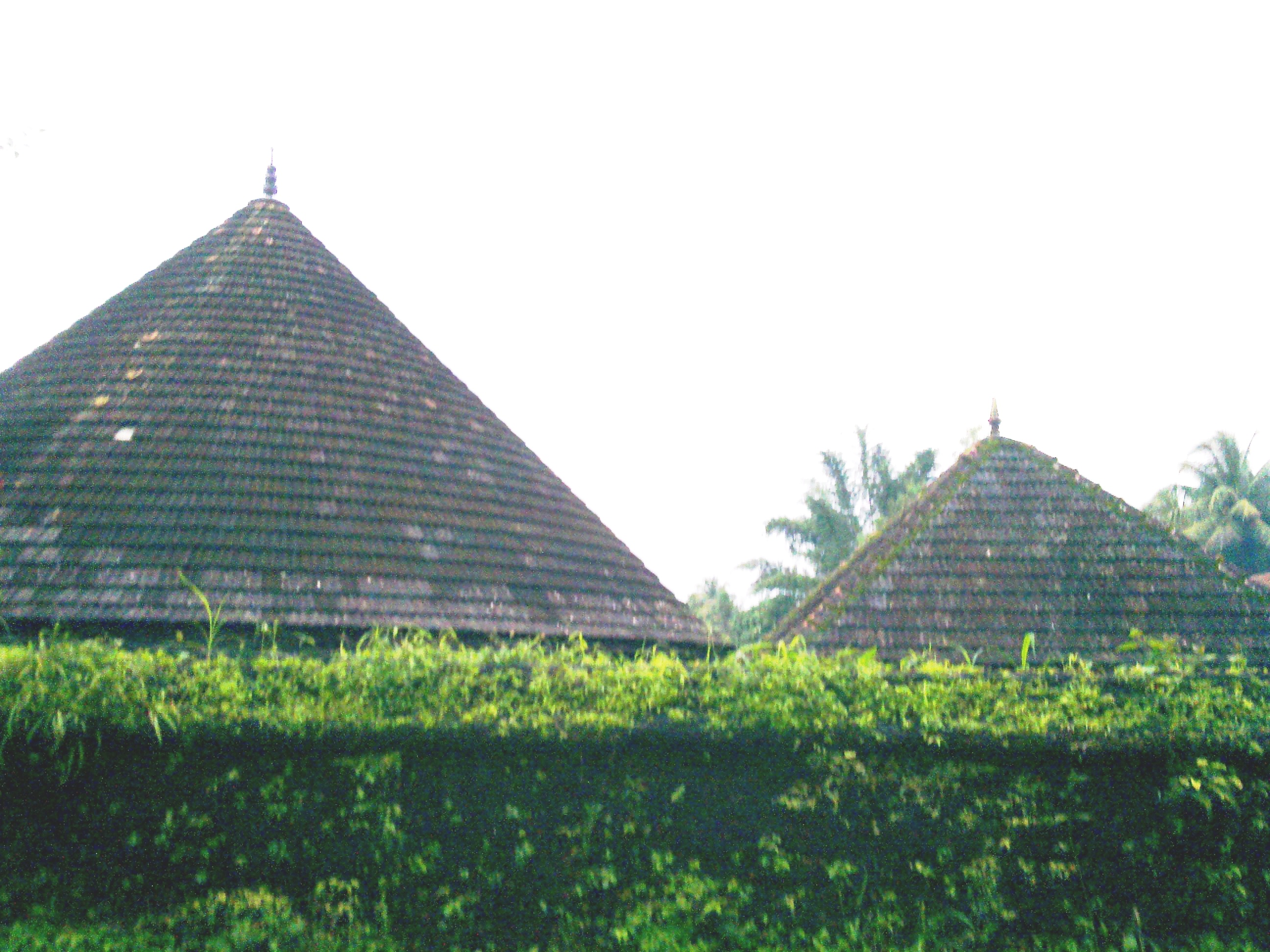
Sreekovil & Mandapom
