= Mukkolakkal Bhagawathi Temple =

Hindu temple in Kerala, India

Mukkolakkal Bhagavathi Temple
- Location in Kerala

Religion
- Affiliation: Hinduism
- District: Thiruvananthapuram
- Deity: Mukkolakkal Bhagavathi

Location
- Location: Sreevaraham
- State: Kerala
- Country: India
- Coordinates: 8.47°N 76.96°E

The Mukkolakkal Bhagawathi Temple (Malayalam: മുക്കോലക്കല്‍ ഭഗവതി ക്ഷേത്രം) is a temple of the Hindu mother goddess Bhagawati at Sreevaraham, on the south-east of Padmanabhaswamy Temple in Thiruvananthapuram.

== See also ==
- Temples of Kerala
