= Chowalloor Siva Temple =

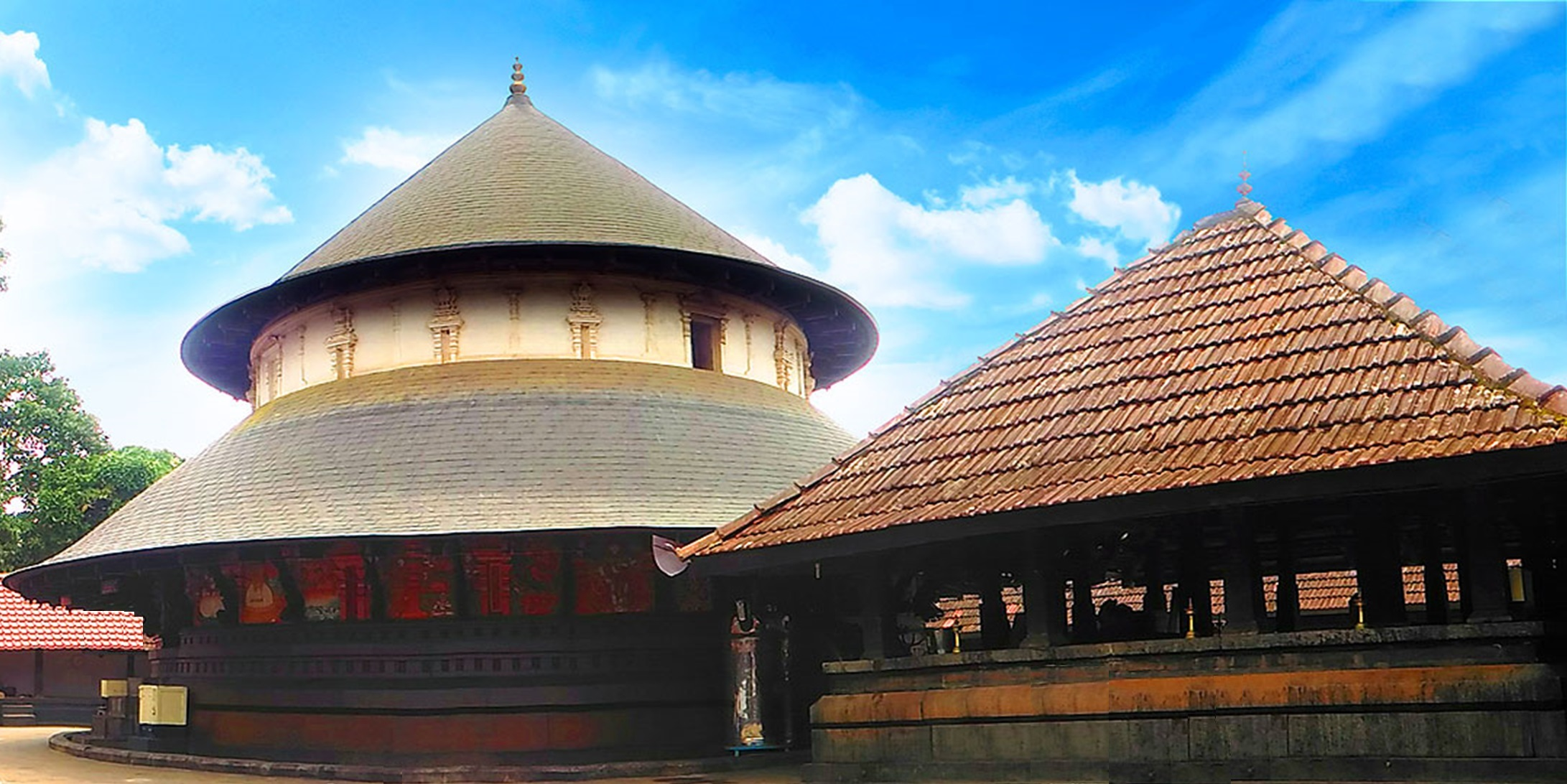
- Sanctum Sanctorum & Namaskara Mandapam

- Location in Kerala

Religion
- Affiliation: Hinduism
- District: Thrissur District
- Deity: Shiva, Parvathi
- Festival: Maha Shivaratri

Location
- Location: Guruvayoor
- State: Kerala
- Country: India
- Interactive map of Chowalloor Siva Temple
- Coordinates: 10.6°N 76.1°E

Architecture
- Type: (Kerala style)
- Completed: Not known (believed to be thousands of years old)
- Monument: 1

Chowalloor Siva Temple is an ancient Hindu temple dedicated to Shiva at Guruvayoor of Thrissur District in Kerala state in India. The presiding deity of the temple is Shiva, located in main sanctum sanatorium, facing West. According to folklore, sage Parashurama has installed the idol. The temple is a part of the 108 famous Shiva temples in Kerala and one among the five Shiva temples around Guruvayoor. Only Hindus are allowed inside the temple premises. Daily three poojas are conducted for Lord Shiva; Shivaratri and Ashtami Rohini are the major festivals of the temple.

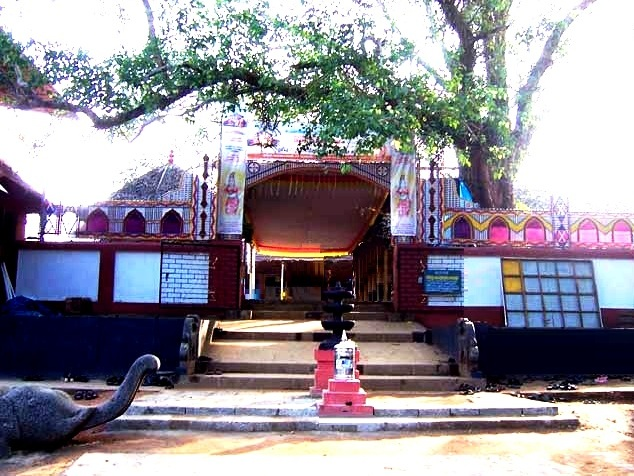
Temple Entrance

== Temple structure ==
The Chowalloor temple has about 4 acres of land. It has built a large edifice around it. The towers are not built on the side of the temple wall. There is no flag mast there because there is no festival in the temple. The main Balikallu in Balikalpura is about 10 feet tall. So from outside, the Shiva lingam can not be seen. On the north-west side of the temple here is a shrine of Subrahmanya Swamy facing to east. The Subrahmanya Temple is a part of the renovation of the temple in 2001. The temple's main sanctum sanatorium is in round shape and which is made of two floors. The second roof of the Sanctum Sanctorum is made by copper and there is a golden dam.

== See also ==
- 108 Shiva Temples
- Temples of Kerala
- Hindu temples in Thrissur Rural
