= Karimpuzha Sree Ramaswamy Temple =

Hindu temple in Kerala, India

- Sree Ramaswamy Temple, Karimpuzha, Palakkad, Kerala

Religion
- Affiliation: Hinduism
- District: Palakkad
- Deity: Rama

Location
- Location: Karimpuzha
- State: Kerala
- Country: India
- Interactive map of Karimpuzha Sree Ramaswamy Temple
- Coordinates: 10°55′03″N 76°25′23″E

Architecture
- Type: Architecture of Kerala

Specifications
- Temple: One
- Elevation: 74.3 m (244 ft)

Karimpuzha Sree Ramaswamy Temple (also known as the Dakshina Ayodhya) is located in Palakkad district, Kerala, India. It lies on the bank of the Karimpuzha River, a major tributary of the Bharathapuzha River.

The temple was owned by Kozhikode Samoodhiripad - Eralpad, the heir to become Samoodhiri, who had his "Kovilakam" in Karimpuzha. The temple has special offerings and pujas. It is believed that Rama renounced his life here in the river Karimpuzha (thus River Sarayu eventually). Rama is accompanied by Hanuman only during his last moments, which justifies the presence of Hanuman here. Later, the deity of Hanuman was placed inside the temple.

This is one of the rarest 'Mahakshetrams' in Kerala

== See also ==
- Temples of Kerala
