= Padiyanoor Devi Temple =

Hindu temple in Kerala, India

Padiyanoor Sree Chamundi Devi Temple
- Padiyanoor Devi Kshetram

Religion
- Affiliation: Hinduism
- District: Thiruvananthapuram
- Deity: Chamundi Bhagavathi

Location
- Location: Poovachal
- State: Kerala
- Country: India
- Interactive map of Padiyanoor Sree Chamundi Devi Temple

Padiyanoor Sree Chamundi Devi Temple or Padiyanoor Devi Temple is a Hindu temple dedicated to Goddess Chamundi located in Thiruvananthapuram, India. This ancient temple, is situated at Poovachal, around 30 km from Thiruvananthapuram city.

== Shrines ==
Main Shrine:

Chamundi Devi, cardinal deity of the temple. She is considered a fierce form of Kali.

Other shrines:

- Yakshiymma
- Ganapati
- Thampuran
- Yogeshwara
- Nagar
- Brahmarakshas

== Festivals ==
=== Main Festival ===
Makam Thozhal - A 3-day annual festival in Meenam (March-April) celebrating Chamundi Devi.

=== Other Festivals ===
1. Karthika - Karthika Deepa
2. Mandala Vratham - Festival in connection with the annual Utsavam of Sabarimala
3. Pooja Vaypu - Identical to Dussera festival (Saraswathy Pooja and Vidyarambham)
4. Ayilya Pooja - Milk, flowers etc. offered to serpent God and special rites
5. Aiswarya Pooja - On all full moon (Pournami) days
6. Vishu Kani - On the first day of the month of Medam people come here for the Vishukani Darshanam.

== Transport ==
Poovachal is just 30 km from Thiruvananthapuram city. The nearest airport is Thiruvananthapuram International Airport. The nearest railway station is Thiruvananthapuram Central Railway Station and the nearest bus station is Kattakada Bus Station.

Those who travel via Kattakada on reaching Poovachal Mulammoodu junction should take the right turn via Kurakonam to the temple.

== See also ==
- Temples of Kerala
