= Sree Shivashakthi Mahaganapathi Temple =

Hindu temple in Kerala, India

- Sree Shivashakthi Mahaganapathi Temple, Keezhamakkam, Chenkal, Thiruvananthapuram, Kerala

Religion
- Affiliation: Hinduism
- District: Thiruvananthapuram
- Deity: Shivashakthi Mahaganapathi
- Festival: 3 days annually starting from Chithra poornima day(2) Maha Shivaratri Ayiswarya pooja on all Pournami

Location
- Location: Keezhamakkam, Chenkal
- State: Kerala
- Country: India
- Interactive map of Sree Shivashakthi Mahaganapathi Temple
- Coordinates: 8°21′11.9″N 77°06′18.4″E

Architecture
- Type: Architecture of Kerala

Specifications
- Temple: One
- Elevation: 38.82 m (127 ft)

Sree Shivashakthi Mahaganapathi temple is a Hindu temple dedicated to Lord Shiva, Devi Parvati and Lord Ganapathi.

== Location ==
The temple is located at Keezhammakam, Chenkal Panchayath in Kerala, India. This temple is situated at an altitude of about 38.82 m (127.4 ft) above mean sea level with the geographic coordinates of 8°21′11.9″N 77°06′18.4″E.

== Festival ==
Ganesh Chaturthi is celebrated in a grand manner every year.
