= Thrikkavu Temple =

Hindu temple in Kerala, India

Coordinates: 10.777°N 75.9291°E

Thrikkavu Sri Durga Bhagavathy Temple is an ancient Temple situated in Ponnani, Malapuram District, Kerala State, India. Goddess Durga is the main deity of this centuries old temple. Even though authentic details are not available about the age of the temple, it is considered one of the 108 Durga temples consecrated by Lord Parasurama in kerala. It is believed that the name Thrikkavu originated from "Thrikkani Kaadu ". The devastation caused by Tipu Sultan to the ancient and holy temples of Keraladheeswaram, Thrikkandiyoor and Thriprangatu in Vettum region was terrible. The Zamorin renovated these temples to some extent. The famous and ancient Thirunavaya Temple, known throughout the country as an ancient teaching-centre of the Vedas, revered by the devotees of Vishnu from Tamil Nadu, and existing before the advent of Christ, was also plundered and destroyed by Tipu's army (Malabar Gazetteer). After dismantling and destroying the idol, Tipu converted the Thrikkavu Temple into an ammunition depot in Ponnani (Malabar Manual). It was the Zamorin who repaired the temple later.

== Deity ==
The Devi is here in her Chathurbhaahu (four arms) form with Chakra (disc), Sankha (conch), Varada (in a boon-conferring pose) and katibadha (arm rest in the hip). Thrikkavu Bhagavathy is believed to be "Sarvabeeshtapradhayini" (one who grants all wishes) and numerous bhakthas have stories legion to tell of her supreme benevolence. The Bhagavathy is worshipped in three different forms: Parvati, Lakshmi and Saraswati.

Apart from the main deity, the temple complex consists of Krishna temple and Upa-Devatha temples for Mahaganapathi, Sasthavu, Sidhi Vinayakan, Hanuman and Brahma Rakshass. There is Moola Ganapathy Temple near the pond (Kshetrakulam) along with Naga Raja, Naga Yakshi and Naga pratishtas

== Festivals ==
The main festival is Navarathri Mahotsavam which attracts large number of devotees. Vidyarambham (beginning of formal education) is conducted on the Vijayadasami day of Navarathri utsavam. Thousands of children throng this temple on that day. The Vrishchicka Mandala mahotsavam (festival) is celebrated during the entire period of mandalam season.

== See also ==
- Temples of Kerala
