= Vayalil Thrikkovil Mahavishnu Temple =

- Vayalil Thrikkovil Mahavishnu Temple, Kalluvathukkal, Kollam, Kerala

Religion
- Affiliation: Hinduism
- District: Kollam
- Deity: Mahavishnu
- Festivals: Ashtami Rohini Maholsavam, Bhagavatha sapthaham, Lakshmi Narayana Pooja

Location
- Location: Kalluvathukkal
- State: Kerala
- Country: India
- Interactive map of Vayalil Thrikkovil Mahavishnu Temple
- Coordinates: 8°49′45.3″N 76°45′40.3″E

Architecture
- Type: Architecture of Kerala

Specifications
- Temple: One
- Elevation: 42.17 m (138 ft)

Vayalil Thrikkovil Mahavishnu Temple is an ancient temple located in Ilamkulam, Kalluvathukkal, Kollam, India. It is located 2 km from NH 47. In the temple, the Laskhmi Narayana Pooja is held twice a month. The temple also celebrates the festivals of Ashtami Rohini Maholsavam and Bhagavatha Sapthaham. The temple is owned by Pisharikkal Mana in Kodungalloor, but the functioning of temple is managed by a forum of local people.

== See also ==
- Temples of Kerala
