= Mayathi Devi Temple =

Hindu temple in Kerala, India

The Mayathi Temple is an extremely ancient temple located in Balanthode in Kasaragode district in the South Indian state of Kerala. According to the Puranas, this temple is one of the famous sacred places of Kerala and India. Mayathi is on the border of Karnataka state and Kasaragode District, next to the State Highway 56. This very ancient pilgrimage center is centered on the Devi temple (that is dedicated to the Adhiparasakthi (or Santhasworoopini) or Ohmkaram, the Universal Consciousness), and covers thirty-six acres of land.

== Transportation ==
This temple town is connected to Karnataka state through Panathur. There is a 20 km road from Panathur to Sullia in Karnataka from where Bangalore and Mysore can be easily accessed. Locations in Kerala can be accessed by driving towards the western side. The nearest railway station is Kanhangad railway station on Mangalore-Palakkad line. There are airports at Mangalore and Calicut.

== See also ==
- Temples of Kerala
