= Vadakkan Koyikkal Devi Temple Puthiyavila =

Vadakkan Koyikkal Devi Temple, Puthiyavila
- Vadakkan Koyikkal Devi Temple, Puthiyavila, Alappuzha, Kerala

Religion
- Affiliation: Hinduism
- District: Alappuzha
- Deity: Parvati
- Festivals: Kumbha Bharani, Nava Yajnam

Location
- Location: Puthiyavila
- State: Kerala
- Country: India
- Interactive map of Vadakkan Koyikkal Devi Temple, Puthiyavila
- Coordinates: 9°11′25″N 76°27′14″E

Architecture
- Type: Architecture of Kerala

Specifications
- Temple: One
- Elevation: 25.04 m (82 ft)

Vadakkan Koyikkal temple, a Devi temple or Bhagavathi temple near Kayamkulam, is situated in Puthiyavila village, Alappuzha in Kerala.

Sree Parvathy Devi is mainly worshiped in the temple. The other main idols of this temple are lord Shiva, Bhadrakaali and Sree Dharma Shastav. Idols of Naga devada, Khandakarna, Yekshi, Yogishwara and Brahmarakshas are also worshiped in this temple.

The main specialty of Vadakkan Koyikkal temple is that the sreekovil (main temple) is a two-storey structure. Sree Parvathy, the main idol, is placed on the ground floor, while Mahadeva (Shiva) is located on the first floor.

Kumba Bharani is the main festival of the temple, celebrated on the Bharani day of the Malayalam calendar month Kumbham. This festival is believed to mark the birthday of Vadakkan Koyikkal Devi and lasts for 10 days, featuring impressive kettukazhcha on the ninth and tenth days.

Navaha Yekngam is one of the celebrations held at Vadakkan Koyikkal Devi temple, conducted over nine days in April–May. During these nine days, religious ceremonies (poja) are performed, and annadana (offering food to people) takes place daily within the temple premises.

== See also ==
- Temples of Kerala
- Temple festivals of Kerala
