= Andoor Kandan Sree Dharma Sastha Temple, Tholady =

Hindu temple in Kerala, India

- Andoor Kandan Sree Dharma Sastha Temple, Tholady, Karakonam, Thiruvananthapuram, Kerala

Religion
- Affiliation: Hinduism
- District: Thiruvananthapuram
- Deity: Sree Dharma Sastha
- Festival: Makara vilakku Mahotsavam

Location
- Location: Karakonam
- State: Kerala
- Country: India
- Coordinates: 8°23′49.9″N 77°10′48.7″E

Architecture
- Type: Kerala architecture

Specifications
- Temple: One
- Elevation: 110.24 m (362 ft)

Andoor Kandan Sree Dharma Sastha Temple is a Sastha Temple in south Kerala, India. It is 13 km east of Neyyattinkara and 32 km south-east of Thiruvananthapuram, Kerala. Dharma Sastha is the main deity.

== Gallery ==
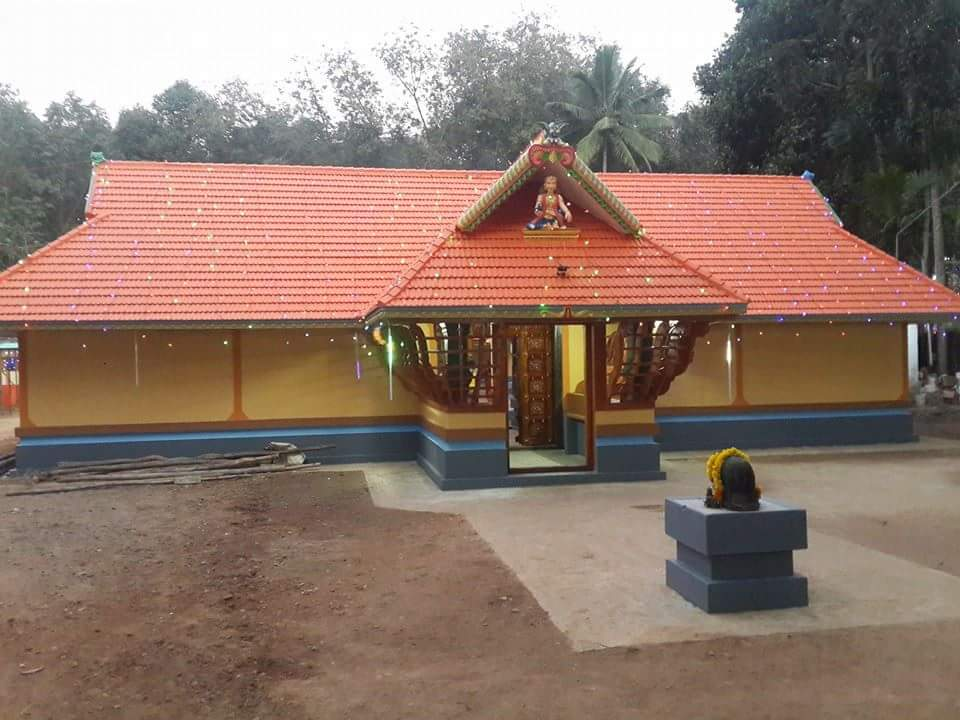
Front view

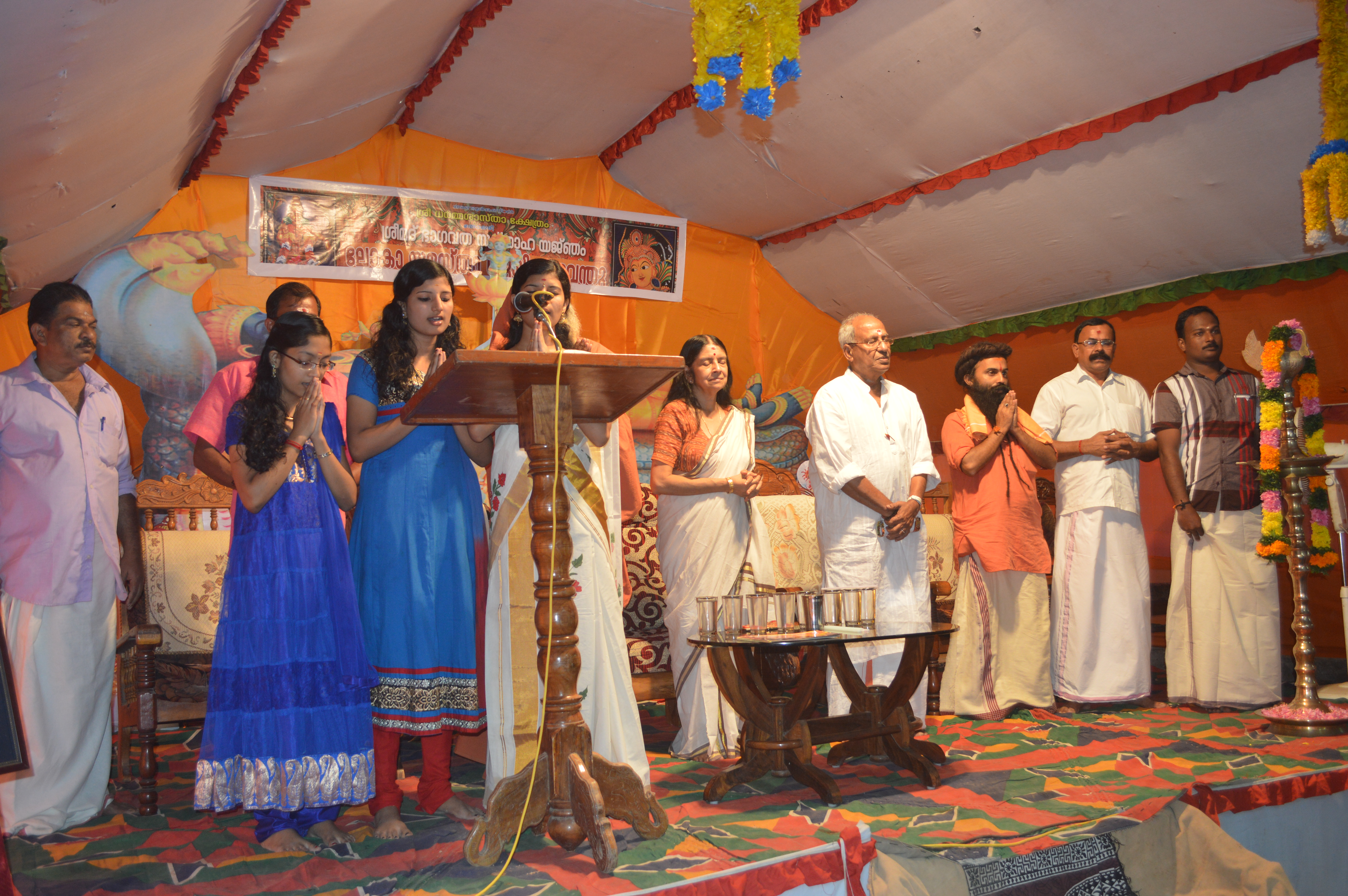
Temple inauguration

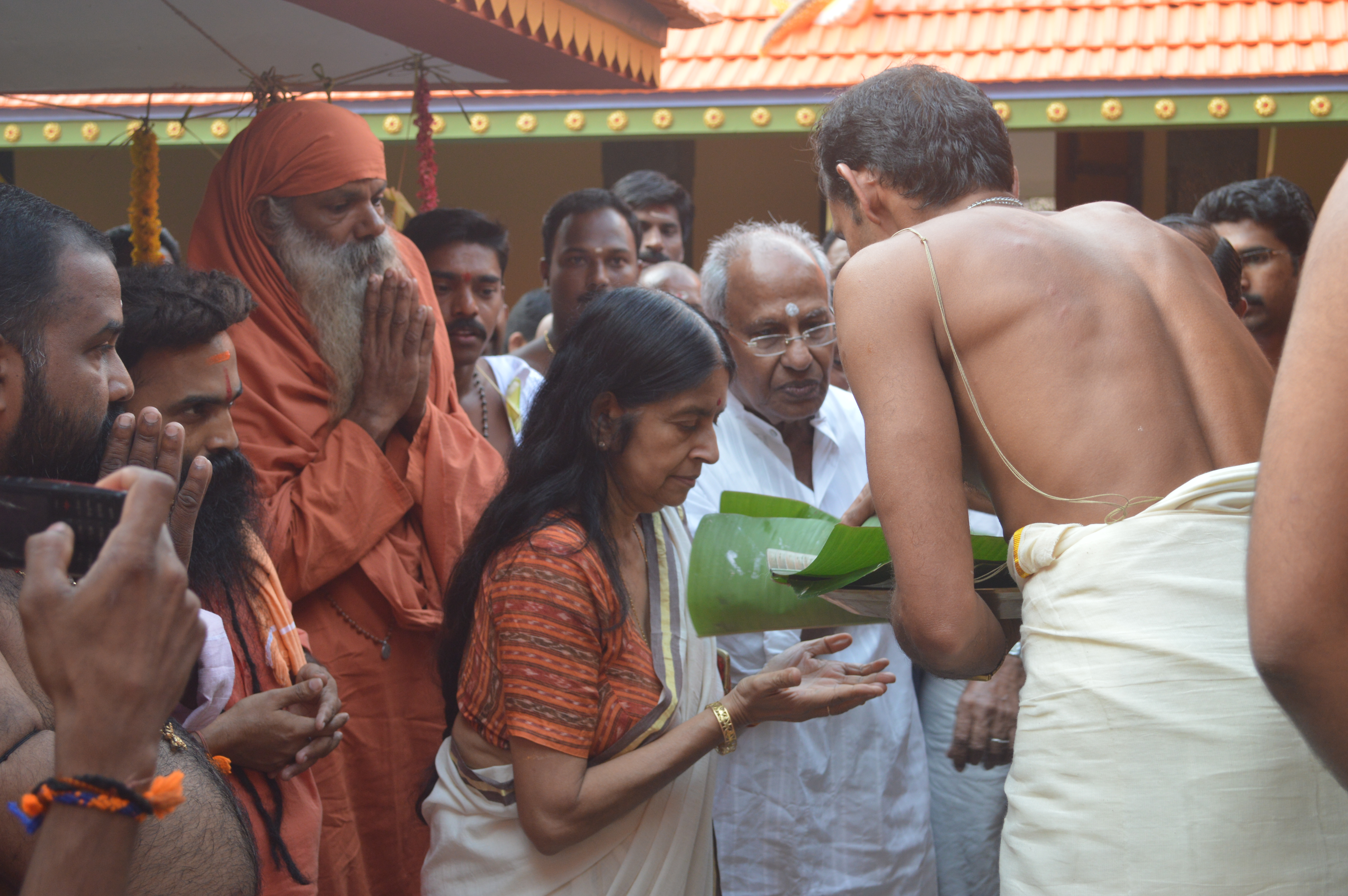
Inaugural participants in front of the temple
