= Madai Vadukunda Shiva Temple =

Hindu temple in Kannur Taluk district, Kerala, India

Coordinates: 12.0303°N 75.2529°E

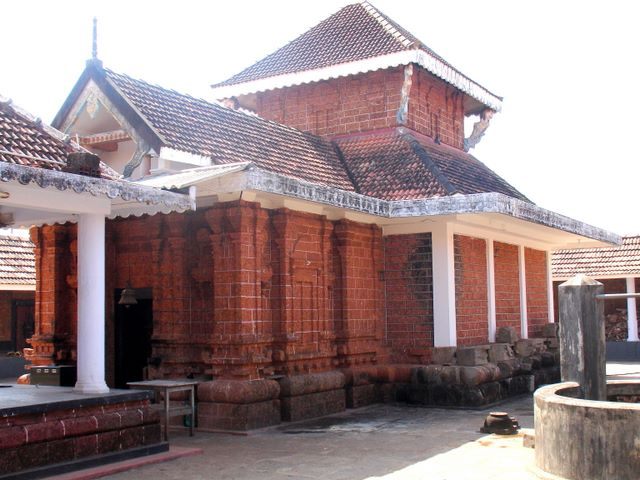

The Madayi Vadukunda Shiva temple is a Hindu temple located in Madayi, Kannur district of Kerala.It is believed to have been constructed by "Kolathiri" Kings during Middle Ages on a plateau land generally known now as Madayipara. This is located 24 km (15 mi) north of Kannur, the district headquarters. The "Kolathiri" Kingdom is an inherent branch of the erstwhile Mooshika dynasty, which ruled the Ezhimala empire during the 5th to 8th Century. About 1,200 years back a branch of their dynasty had migrated and settled down at Madayi, which was then an important port and trading center, 4 km (2.5 mi) south of Ezhimala. They constructed castles and temples and established their headquarters on Madayi Para, a significant plateau land lying at about 150 ft (46 m) height from the sea level having sight to an extent of 20 km (12 mi) from all sides. Sree Vadukunda Siva Temple was thus constructed on Madayi Para in the southwest corner of it at a holy spot due to the presence of the divine power of "Swayambhoo" of lord Siva, according to the local legend.

== See also ==
- Temples of Kerala
