= Kodikkunnu Bhagavathy Temple =

Hindu temple in Kerala, India

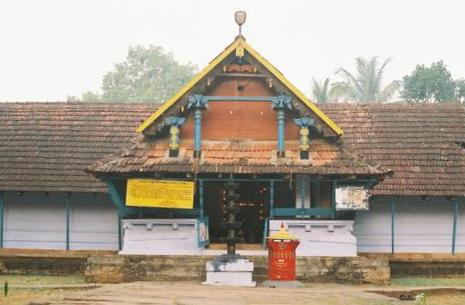

- Kodikkunnu Bhagavathy Temple, Pallippuram, Palakkad, Kerala

Religion
- Affiliation: Hinduism
- District: Palakkad
- Deity: Kali and Shiva

Location
- Location: Pallippuram, Pattambi, Palakkad
- State: Kerala
- Country: India
- Coordinates: 10.830256°N 76.115461°E

Architecture
- Type: South Indian, Temple
- Creator: Unknown
- Completed: Unknown

Specifications
- Temple: One
- Elevation: 66.4 m (218 ft)

The Kodikkunnu Bhagavathy Temple or Kodikkunnu Ambalam is an ancient Hindu temple dedicated to the goddess Bhadrakali located in the village of Pallippuram, near Pattambi, in Palakkad district of Kerala, India.

== Etymology ==
The temple's name is derived from the colloquial name of its enshrined deity, Bhagavathi or Kodikkunnathamma and the suffix "kunnu", which means "hill" in the Malayalam language. Combined, Kodikkunnu would mean the "temple situated on top of Kodi hill".

== Architecture ==
The temple complex features three holy entrances (nada) in three directions—north, east and west—each with a separate granite stone-paved steps that leads to the temple. Within its hall, the temple's principal deity is referred to as Amma (meaning Mother); the principle Hindu deity Siva is enshrined to the same level of regard, along with Ganapathi to the left of the main deity.

== History ==
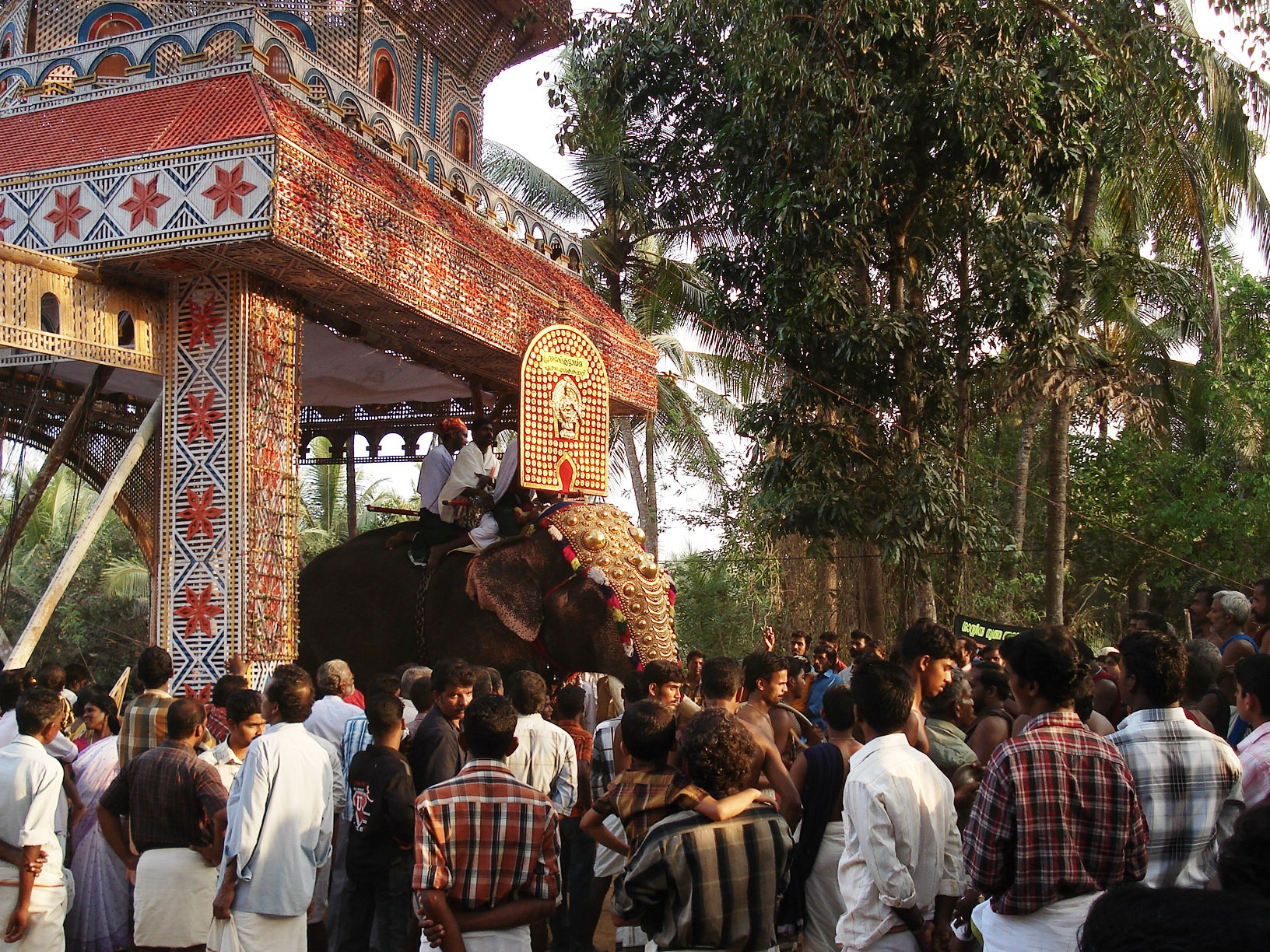
A holy procession of Chirankara Pooram, Ezhunnallathu

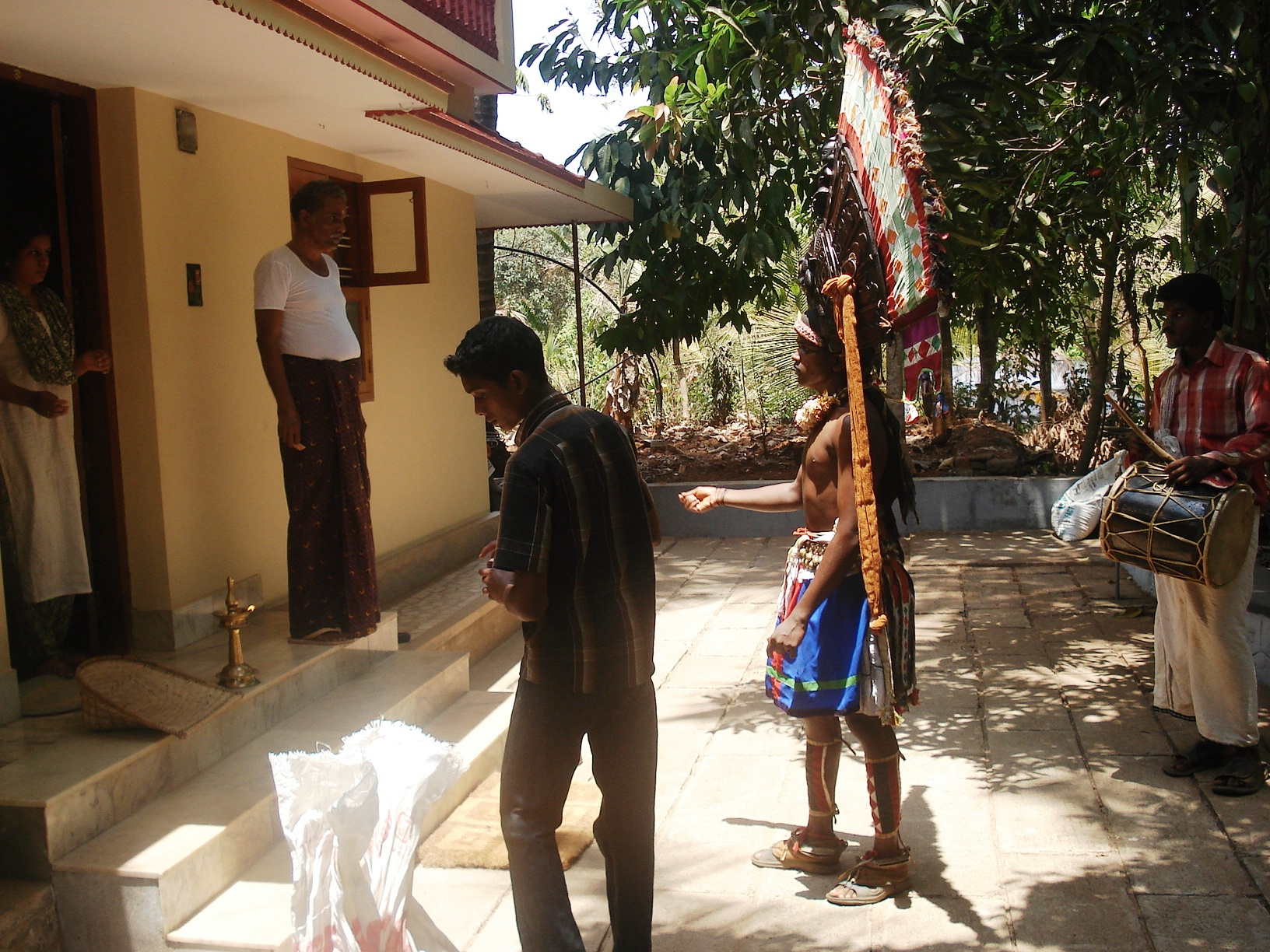
Thara visiting houses during Pooram

=== Origins ===
The temple's origins is attributed to a legendary story of Muthassiar Kavu Bagavathi, the chief deity of Muthassiar Kavu (grandmother's temple) nearby. It is said that the goddess and her three beautiful daughters (including Kodikkunnathamma) had been strolling along the river on a summer night, when the youngest daughter became fixated by kanakkan community dance festival. The legend suggests that when she refused to leave upon the conclusion of the event, the goddess ordered her to be the kanakkan's guardian deity, leading to the creation of Kanakkar Kavu .

Later, the remaining two sisters were said to have quarreled after witnessing the ritual of an animal sacrifice. The younger became engrossed in the ritual and settled in Kodungallur where blood sacrifices are common, leaving the elder to live in Kodikkunnu. The two sisters' dislike for the younger resulted in the closing of their temple doors in the direction facing towards Kodungallur, leading to the absence of a southern entrance at the Kanakkarkavu and Kodikkunnu Temples.

=== Mythological belief ===
A local legend held by surrounding inhabitants is associated with the temple, involving an impoverished widow and her children who lived in a house across the river from the temple. The widow is said to have tend cows and exchanged the cow's milk for cooked rice in the temple daily. She was not able to exchange her said offering during a flood which made the river uncrossable, and fed her children boiled milk. An old woman showed up later at midnight, bringing along a brass vessel full of rice, who later vanished after instructing the widow to feed her children. After the recession of the flood, she returned to the temple with her offering and discussed the event with a surprised priest, who imparted that the brass vessel had been missing from the sanctum sanctorum in the past three days.

== Festivals ==
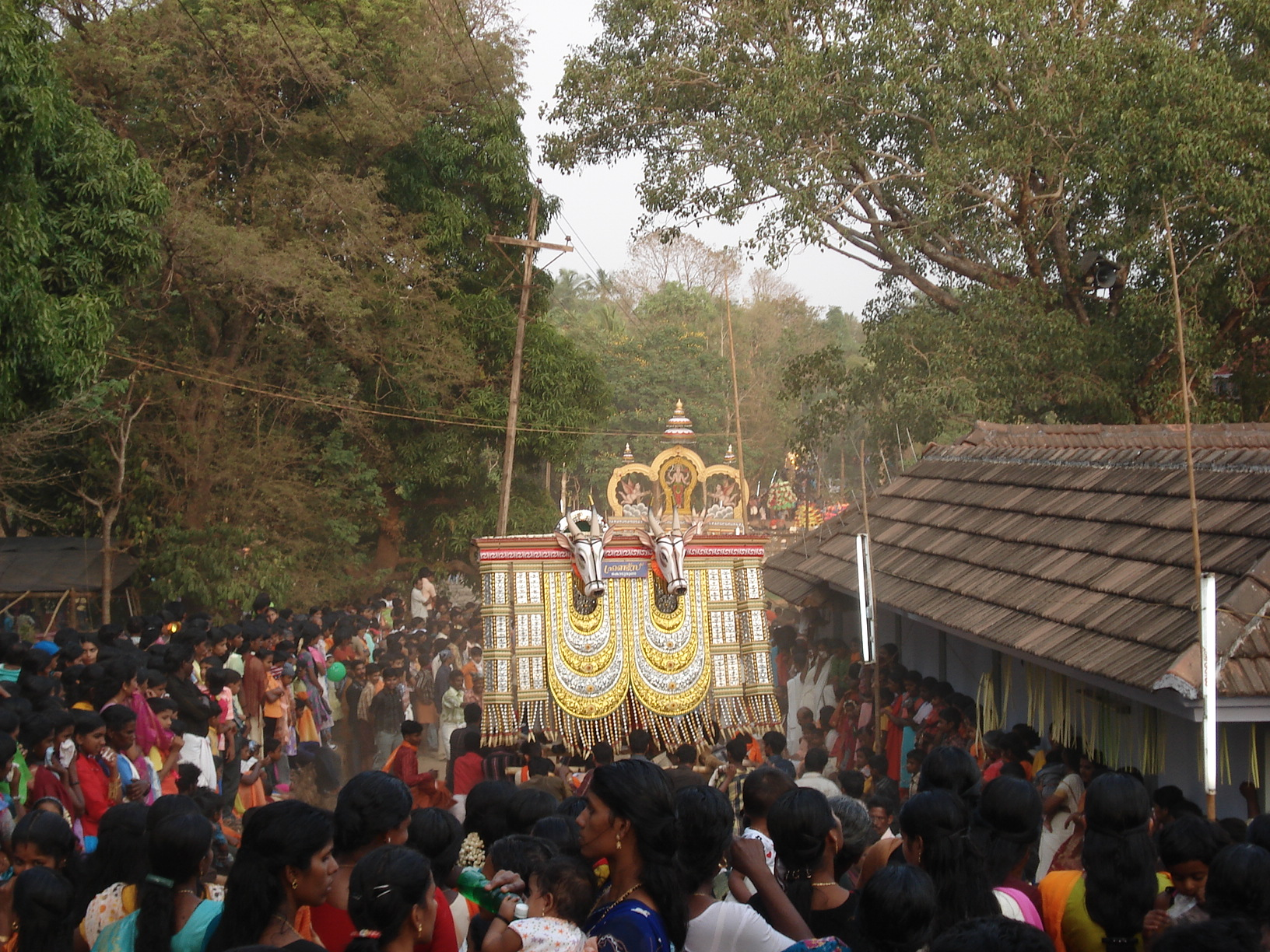
Chirankara Pooram, People bringing "Kettukalas" to the temple

=== Chirankara Pooram ===
Chirankara pooram (temple festival) is the temple's main festival, conducted dedicated to the principal god Vishnu on behalf of Kodikkunnathamma. Such festivals are ordinarily only conducted at Durga temples and the Chirankara Mahavishnu Temple (also known as Keezhekkavu). The area under Pallippuram is divided into smaller administrative geographical units called "desam", in which each desam's people will send different types of dancers called "pootan" and "thara" to performance at the temple during the festival.

The festival consists of a Chenda melam, Thayambaka and Panchvadyam, and the bringing of a pair of decorated artificial bullocks called kaala, before being concluded with a vedikkettu (fireworks event).

=== Kathiratta Vela ===
The temple also conducts a Kathiratta Vela (Festival of Harvest) celebrated after the every year's harvest. The festival functions as a thanksgiving gesture to the goddess for the harvest.

== Gallery ==
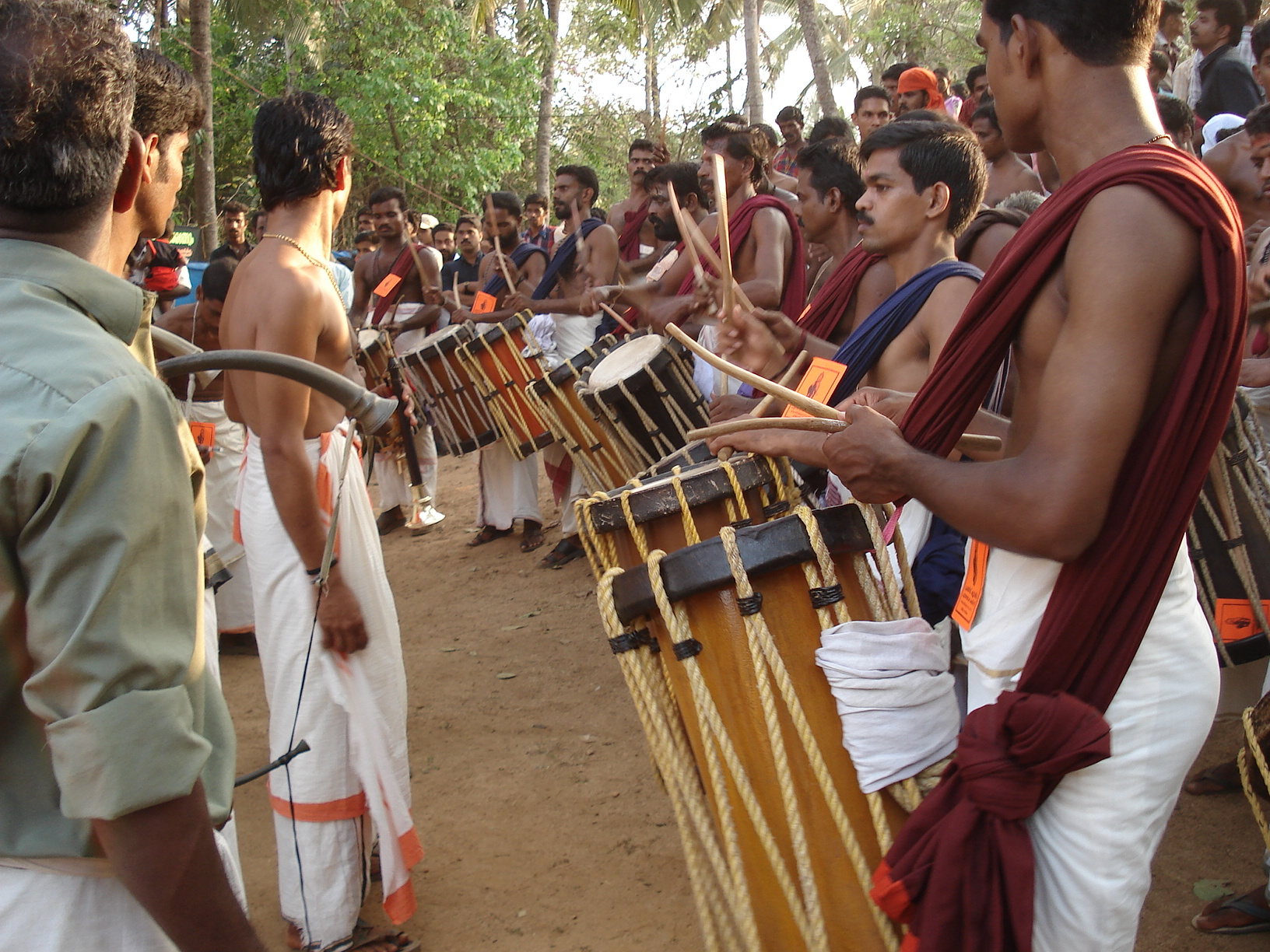
Chirankara Pooram

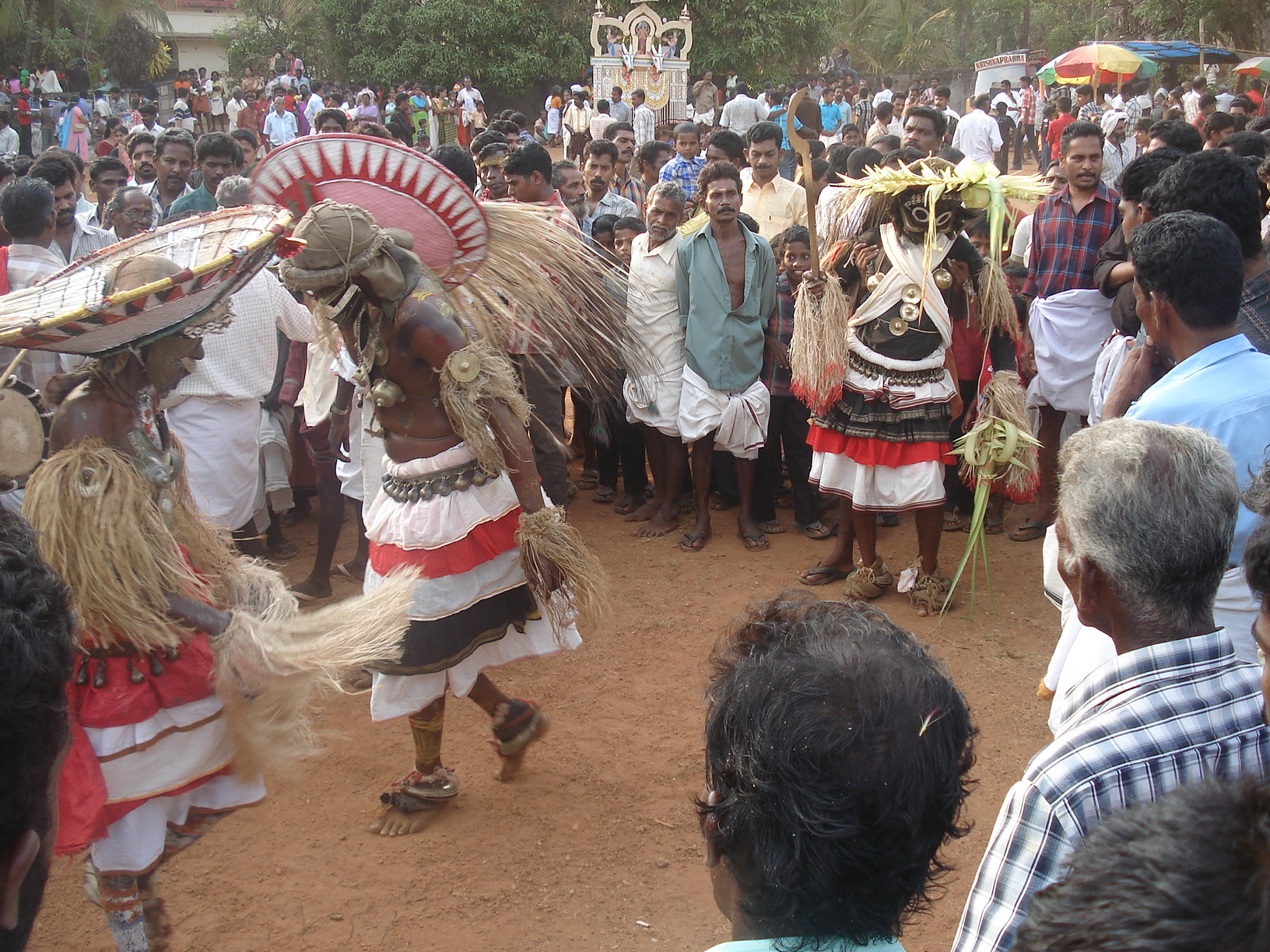
Parappothan visiting houses during Kathirattavela

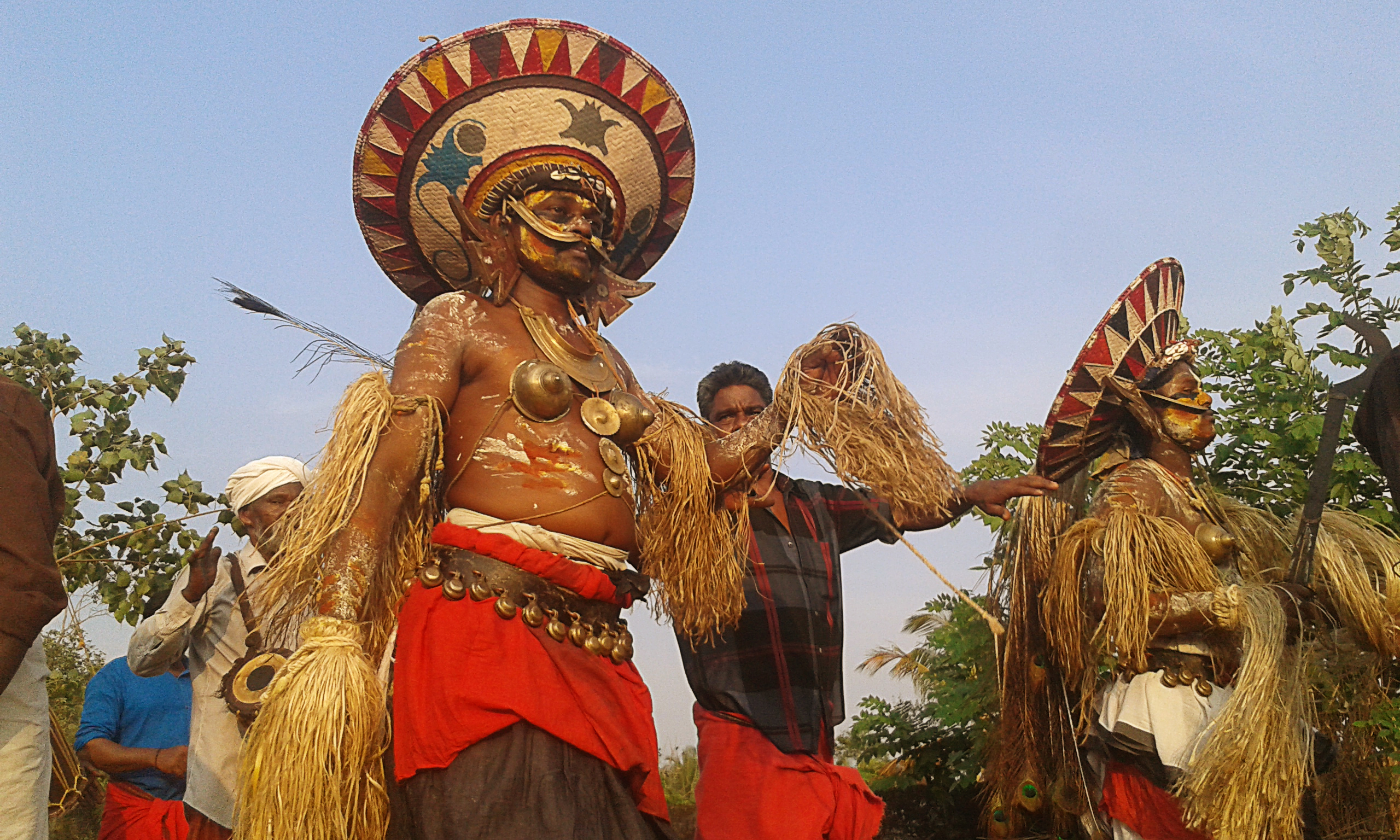
Parappothan

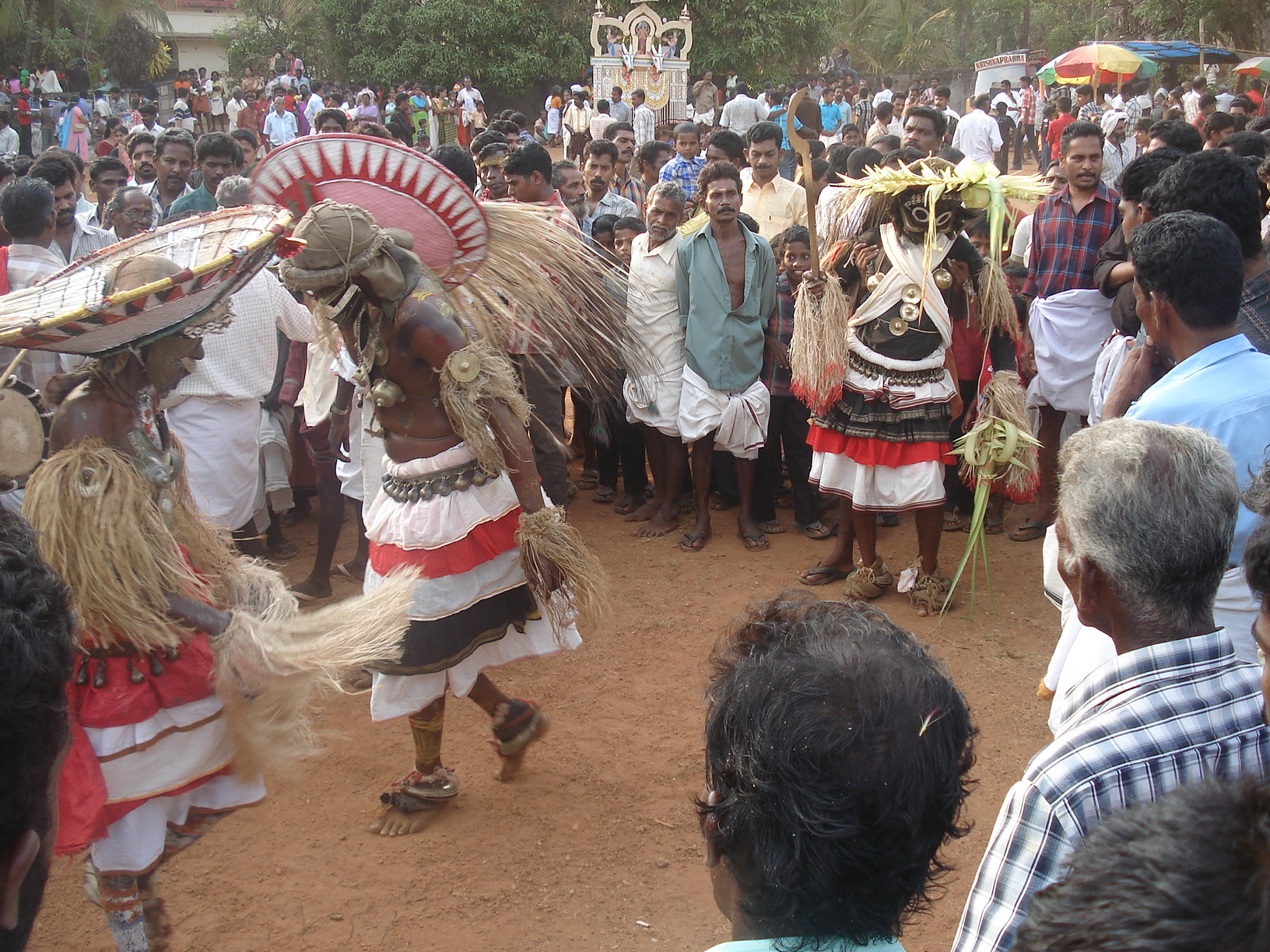
Chirankara Pooram Parappoothan

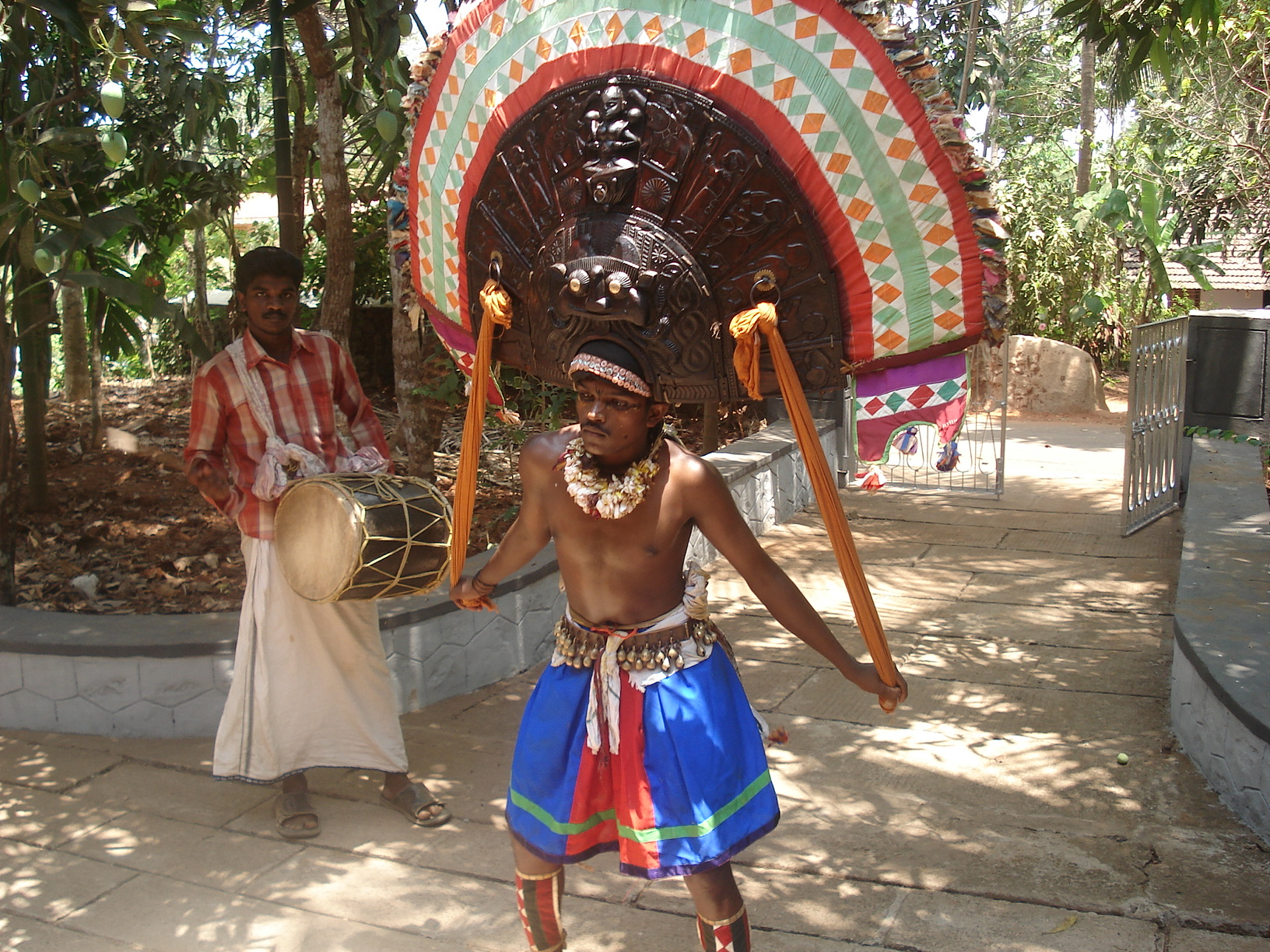
Chirankara Pooram Thara

== See also ==
- Temples of Kerala
