= Amunthirathu Devi Temple =

Hindu temple in Kerala, India

Amunthirathu Devi
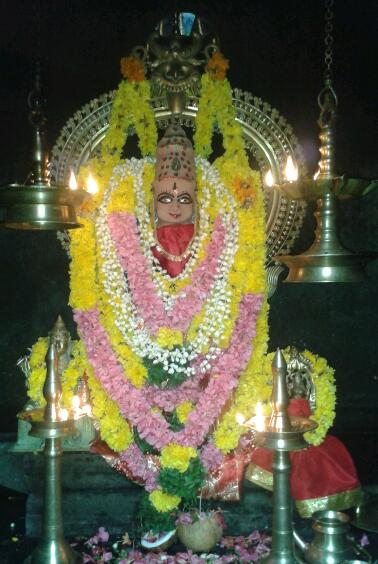

- Amunthirathu Devi Temple, Mudakkal, Thiruvananthapuram Kerala

Religion
- Affiliation: Hinduism
- District: Thiruvananthapuram
- Deity: Goddess Sree Bhadrakali
- Festival: Meena Uthra Maholsavam

Location
- Location: Mudakkal, Attingal
- State: Kerala
- Country: India
- Coordinates: 8°41′06.4″N 76°52′44.4″E

Architecture
- Type: Pandya kovil blended with kerala traditional
- Elevation: 51.87 m (170 ft)

Amunthirathu Devi Temple is a Hindu temple dedicated to Goddess Sree Bhadra Kali located in Thiruvananthapuram, India. The temple is situated at Mudakkal, around 8 km north of Attingal in the Thiruvananthapuram district of Kerala. The temple enshrines a black stone idol of the goddess Amunthirathamma, an incarnation of Bhadra Kali. Devi is in Ardha padmasana (a yoga posture), Andarmugha (partially closed eyes) and chathur bahu (four arms).

== History ==
Amunthirathu 'madam' (joint family) is a sub family of Vanjipuzha madam which is a Brahmin madam believed to be existed before the period of Raja Rama Varma (Travancore raja of 1724-1729) in Chengannur, Alappuzha. As then, the shrine of every Brahmin madam holds many Nair prominent and it holds many other cast groups under. At the beginning of the 17th century according to historians, within this small Travancore royal state, the power of the chief was only nominal, due to the power of the nobles, chief among them being the Barons of the Eight Houses (Pillaimar) and the barons (Matampimar). The powers of the ruler were also to a great extent curbed by the power of the Council of Eight and a Half (Yogakkar), the managing committee of Padmanabhaswamy Temple, Thiruvananthapuram. Travancore nobles were opposed to adoption made by the ruler in 1718 and out of fear for her life, the princess (who was the adopted sister of Marthanda Varma), was living in exile at Harippad with her four-year-old son (who grew up to be Dharma Raja). In the year 1728 the princess received news that the Ettuveetil Pillamar had despatched a band of soldiers to assassinate her and the little prince. She decided to seek refuge with the Vanjipuzha Thampuran of Vanjipuzha madam, the Brahmin Rajah of Chengannur, where she would be safe. In coordination with the princess's husband, the Kilimanoor Koil Thampuran, the Valiyamma provided an escort until Chengannur. She personally travelled with the princess and her presence of mind and the bravery of the Koil Thampuran helped save the lives of the princess and her son. The rivalries of European powers like the Dutch and the English made the situation more complex.

In the year 1729-1758 Anizham Thirunal Marthanda varma become the Travancore raja and he fought against these noble aristocracies existed then in Travancore. But due to the opposition of the nobles, Marthanda Varma had to flee the capital for the safety of places such as Kottarakara (Kollam) and Kayamkulam (Alappuzha), where he is narrated by historians, to have lived in difficulty for many years, travelling from one place to another to escape his political enemies. Marthanda varma made intimate relations with Vanjipuzha thampuran for helping his sister and son-in-law. By political moves Marthanda varma gain victory over the nobles in travancore and bring his sister and son-in-law to Attingal palace which was considered as the ancestral homes of Travancore royals.

The Queendom of Attingal favours Devi (female god) worship rather than deva (male god) and the queenly state is rich in Devi temples and Ammachi veedu (where the home was ruled by a grand female). Marthanda varma in 1727 brought seven Vanjipuzha madam sub-Brahmin families including Amunthirathu madam from Chengannur who were from the priest line of Chengannur Mahadeva temple and give property in and around Thiruvananthapuram. This was also a political move against the then existed Nair-Brahmin equity of Travancore including the Eight Houses (Pillaimar) and the council of eight and a half (Yogakkar). Nair cast are often brought out as the soldiers to the Queendom of Attingal and Kingdom of Travancore and it is very common to practice kalari marshal art associated with every Brahmin madam. Brahmins of Amunthirathu madam are the favorite to the king and are given property near to the Attingal palace (Keezhatingal, Otoor) they also hold a 'Kalari bhagavathi- bhadra kali' which is made of a gold oar "Salagramam" and they do daily offerings to the goddess. The idol was also believed to be worshiped by Marthanda Varma during his life of difficulties. Apart from Brahmins, Nairs are the only permitted group for worship due to the racial discrimination existed then. In the same period another Brahmin madam called ‘Kallara madam’ which was also one among from the seven was given property at 'Alankaravattom' in the same 'Attingal maharajyam', (in August 1925 the ‘Village Panchayat Regulation - VII’ (1100 Malayalam Era) named the region as Mudakkal in chirayankezhu thaluk of Thiruvananthapuram District). Both these Brahmin families have some properties in both the place of Kezhattingal and Mudakkal. Kallara madam also holds a Devi worship of their own and this was meant for upanayana and other Brahmin rituals.

From Old words, it was noted that Kallara madam generates some land and property issues against Amunthirathu madam and hinder agricultural practices. Finally, they were believed to mutually exchange some part of their share without any conflict and start to do harvest festivals. It is believed that the 7 day festival of both the madam temples were practiced at one time and has some relation. It was heard that lord Shiva come from the nearby Aayiravalli temple on elephant, first visit Kallara madam Devi but at that time the goddess was in her oestrual (Fertility) periods and represented by a white cloth dipped in red stain (Aratha vellam), Lord Shiva returned and Amunthirathu Devi welcomes him with all kinds of pleasure. This ritual in old time is called 'Naaipuu' and has many similarities with the 'Triputharattu' of Shakthi Peedam in Chengannur maha deva temple (from where the Brahmins are related in history).

In the long run, Amunthirathu madam and Kallara madam have almost perished and the goddess was left without any worship and offerings for many years in an abandoned room of madam (Ara). For a short time, Amunthirathu Devi was also believed to be worshiped by the lower cast, and by this time the idol of 'salagramam' was lost, and the worship change to some weapons of the goddess. During the early 19th century Brahmins become a rare and minor group and by the amalgamation of Travancore with Attingal the mighty land holders- Nairs make benefit of property by agriculture and in the meantime many backward castes were zonalized for various activities and the groups start worshiping in their own means. After a long sleep, Amunthirathu devi was again worshiped by these groups headed by Nair community as 'Padkali' with many ritual practices as 'Thookam', 'Kuthiyottam', 'Kaapu kettu', 'Kuruthi','Palli Vaeta' etc. During this period the worship practice again shifted to a mirror. The goddess's favorite offering include 'Otada nivaedyam' and 'Kadum Payasa nivaedyam'. In the 1950s Kerala was at its maximum for the communist political wave and this was against the traditional rituals and practices.

Kuzhakkadu Kunjan Pillai was the one who sternly stood against this and almost for two and a half decade he co-ordinates the annual Ten-day festival. In the year 1972 Adv. Bhuvana chandran Nair, Kuzhakkadu start the first official yogam for the temple and was the president till to his death (1983). In 1987 July Alamthara Sreedharan mesthiri Mark the devine place for the temple and in 1988 a temple was established (engineer: Kezhatingal Maniyan Mesthiri) and the ditty is Sree Bhadra Kali with Dwaja prathishta. During the temple formation Main priest (Thanthri) was Swamiyar madam Krishnan Potii and daily priest (Shanthi) was Kattaykalil madam Krishnan Potii. The idol was carved from Myladi, Tamil Nadu. In 1991 there was an attempt to do a rare worship practice called 'Kaliootu' but it was collapsed by a heavy rain though it was religiously completed and later advocated in 'Devapreshnam' (Astrological advice from God) to do only after the completion of Chutambalam. In 2005 the temple was registered as Trust (3195/05) under the leadership of the then president Sree Dharan Panaikkal and secretary Adv. Anirudhan Kuzhakkadu. By the 20th century, the temple had expanded with Navagraha prathishta (worship for eight planets and the sun) and Chutambalam.

== Peculiarities of idol ==
Krishna Shila idol of the goddess Amunthirathamma– an incarnation of Bhadra Kali. Devi is in Ardha padmasana, Andarmugha and Chathur Bahu. The length of the idol is 48 angula (1 angula= 1.76 cm) where the unit, 4 represent the no of Vedas (knowledge) and the digit 8 represents the complete prosperity called Ashtaishwaryam (Dhanya= food, Dhana= wealth, Adhi= creation, Veera= Courage, Vijaya= Victory, Sandhana= Motherly, Gaja= Power, Bhagya= Luck). Her right leg is in mooladhara and left on the lion symbolising Shanthi and courage for the same time. Her right hands hold Thrishoola and Nandhaka while the left hold chakra and Daruka shiras. Temple hold two upabimbas (subsidiary idols) of which one is sreebali vigraha (in standing posture) and the other similar to moola bimba. Moolabimba is dramshtradhara so it doesn't hold a pana pathra which is common in Kaali idols. She holds Simha vahana in idol and Vethala vahana in dwaja.

== Amunthirathu devi temple architecture ==
The central sanctum (Sree Kovil) of Amunthirathu temple is in pandya kovil structure similar to many other Kannaki temples of Tamil Nadu and Kerala. It is surrounded by a cloistered prakara, pierced at one or more cardinal points with only a main entrance (gopuradwara). The cloistered prakaram has a namaskara mandapam located directly in front of the sanctum and is also an artistic excellence. Sree Kovil is surrounded by chutambalam. A kitchen is located in the south eastern corner of this cloistered chutambalam. The mukha mandapam is integrated with the gopura entrance is also a part of chutambalam. The flagstaff or dwaja stambham is located outside of the chutambalam. The balipitham is located in the mukhamandapam. The outer prakaram or courtyard houses other subshrines as Ganapathy, Nagar, Brahma rakshasu, Yogeeshwaran, Navagraha, and Madan thampuran. A temple tank is on the south east corner.

== Governance ==
Now the temple is governed by the temple trust registered in 2005 with a constitutional setup elected yearly by the trust members and headed by the president.

== Governance history ==
=== President ===
- Adv. Bhuvanachandran Nair Kuzhakkadu: (1972–83)
- Muraleedharan Nair Kuzhakkadu: (1984–93)
- K. G. Unni Krishna Kurup Kuzhakkadu: (1994–95)
- Sreedharan Nair Panaikkal Veedu: (1996-05)
- Rama Krishnan: (2006–14)
- Manu Kotakuzhi: (2015- )

=== Secretary ===
- Muraleedharan Nair Kuzhakkadu: (1972–83)
- Krishnan Kutty K.K. Mandiram: (1994–95)
- Rama Krishnan: (1996-05)
- Adv. Anirudhan Kuzhakkadu: (2005- )
