= Thamaramkulangara Sree Dharma Sastha Temple =

- Swami Saranam

- Thamaramkulangara Sree Dharma Sastha Temple, Tripunithura, Kochi, Ernakulam, Kerala

Religion
- Affiliation: Hinduism
- District: Ernakulam
- Deity: Lord Ayyappa

Location
- Location: Tripunithura, Kochi
- State: Kerala
- Country: India
- Interactive map of Thamaramkulangara Sree Dharma Sastha Temple
- Coordinates: 9°57′6″N 76°20′19″E

Architecture
- Type: Kerala Architecture
- Completed: Unknown
- Temple: One

Thamaramkulangara Sree Dharma Sastha temple (Malayalam: താമരംകുളങ്ങര ശ്രി ധര്‍മശാസ്താ ക്ഷേത്രം) is a temple in Tripunithura, Kochi, in the state of Kerala, India.
