= Kavinpuram Devi Temple =

Hindu temple in Kerala, India

Kavinpuram Devi Temple is located in the South Indian state of Kerala, near the towns of Pala and Ramapuram in Kottayam district. It is unique among the temples of India as its main idol features both Lord Shiva and his wife Parvati. Typically, a Hindu temple has individual idols for Shiva and Parvati located separately within it. The joint idol of Kavinpuram makes it a rarity in India.

== History ==
According to the great Hindu epic Mahabharatha, Arjuna, third among the five Pandava princes, was once passing through a forest. Arjuna's feats as an archer and a warrior had made him famous, which inflated his ego. Lord Shiva and Parvati decided to humiliate Arjuna so as to make him humble again. They disguised themselves as "Kiratha" and "Kirathi", primitive hunters living in the forest, and challenged him to a fight. Arjuna, not knowing who they were, proceeded to fight them with contempt, only to suffer a humiliating defeat. In his devastation over the loss, Arjuna realized that his opponents must be Lord Shiva and Parvati. Humbled, Arjuna asked for forgiveness, and in return Shiva and Parvati blessed him. The main idol of Kavinpuram Temple depicts their blessing posture in this context.

The actual age of the Temple has not been determined. Since time immemorial, its site has contained the ruins of an ancient temple with several idols in it. Recently, with the efforts of the local community, the Temple has been fully renovated and restored back to its full glory. Now it has become an important Hindu worshipping centre of the region, with devotees coming from far and near. In addition to the main Shiva-Parvati idol, the Temple's inner courtyard features sub-temples for Lord Ganesha and Lord Sastha. Other sub-temples for Naga Raja, Naga Yakshi, Naga Kanyaka and Rakshas are also located within the main compound.

== Festivals ==
The revival of the Temple has also brought back to life its myriad festivals and rituals. The main festival is celebrated on the 12th and 13th days of the month "Dhanu" in the native calendar (usually during the last week of December). The principal attraction at this festival is the "Kavinpuram Thalappoli", which is a long procession of people carrying oil-lit lamps at night. People from all over the region come to the Temple to participate in this event. Other famous festivals are "Pongala" and "Naranga Vilakku", which are held during the month of "Vrischikom".

Fitting for a temple of its stature and prominence, Kavinpuram Temple offers a wide variety of "poojas", or rituals on a daily basis. Some of the most important ones are "Aranaazhipayasam", "Niramala" and "Pushpanjali". Others include cracking coconut for Lord Ganesha, "Neerajanam" for Lord Sastha, "Palpayasam" for Rakshas, and "Thalichukoda" and "Ayilyapooja" for Sarpam. Due to its unique joint Shiva-Parvati idol, the Temple puts special emphasis on poojas that are meant to confer happiness and longevity to the married life of the devotees. One such notable ritual is the "Swayamvara Pushpanjali" pooja, which is conducted on seven consecutive Mondays, culminating with the "Uma-Maheswara" pooja on the evening of the final Monday.
