= Abhimanyu Temple, Vayotthidam =

Hindu temple in India

Vadayothidam Abhimanyu Temple

Religion
- Affiliation: Hinduism
- District: Kozhikode district
- Deity: Abhimanyu

Location
- Location: Mokeri
- State: Kerala
- Country: India
- Interactive map of Vadayothidam Abhimanyu Temple
- Coordinates: 11.663425361225244°N 75.72030143656244°E

Architecture
- Type: Kerala

The Vadayothidam Abhimanyu Temple is a Hindu temple in Vadayothidam, near Mokeri, Kozhikode district, Kerala, India. And, it is the only temple in Kerala for Abhimanyu.

== Festivals ==
One of the most renowned festivals held at the temple is Prathishtadinam, which takes place in March.

== Architecture ==
The Abhimanyu Temple follows the local building style of the Malabar coast, which is made to handle hot weather and heavy monsoon rain. Instead of the heavy granite used in many southern Indian temples, it is built with local laterite stone and wood. The temple has steep, sloping roofs made of wood and tiles that let rainwater run off easily. So the walls do not get damaged. The walls are made of laterite blocks, which are covered in lime plaster to stop them from soaking up water. The building has five main parts, including a granite base and a decorative top.
