= Shaktheeswaram Temple =

Hindu temple in Kerala, India

Shaktheeswaram Temple is a Hindu temple located in Kottayam, India. The main deity of the temple is Goddess Adi Parashakti. Adi Parashakti is the female aspect of the divine venerated as the Supreme Being in Shaktism. The temple is also a center where Traditional Astrology, Tantric Upasana, Sanathana Dharma and the most auspicious pooja in Hinduism called Sri Chakra Pooja is practiced by Head Priest and Tantracharya Sri Kasi Viswanathan.

== Address ==
Aymanam, Kottayam, Kerala, P.O. 686015 Mob: 094 47 522916

== Public Transport ==
From Kottayam city, private buses are available towards Parippu through the Kudayampadi Parippu Road. Alight at Grace Medical Centre bus stop and turn left from Kuzhuthar Junction. The temple is at a five minutes walking distance from here.
