= Puthencavu Bhagavathy Temple =

Hindu Temple

Puthenkavu Bhagavathy Temple
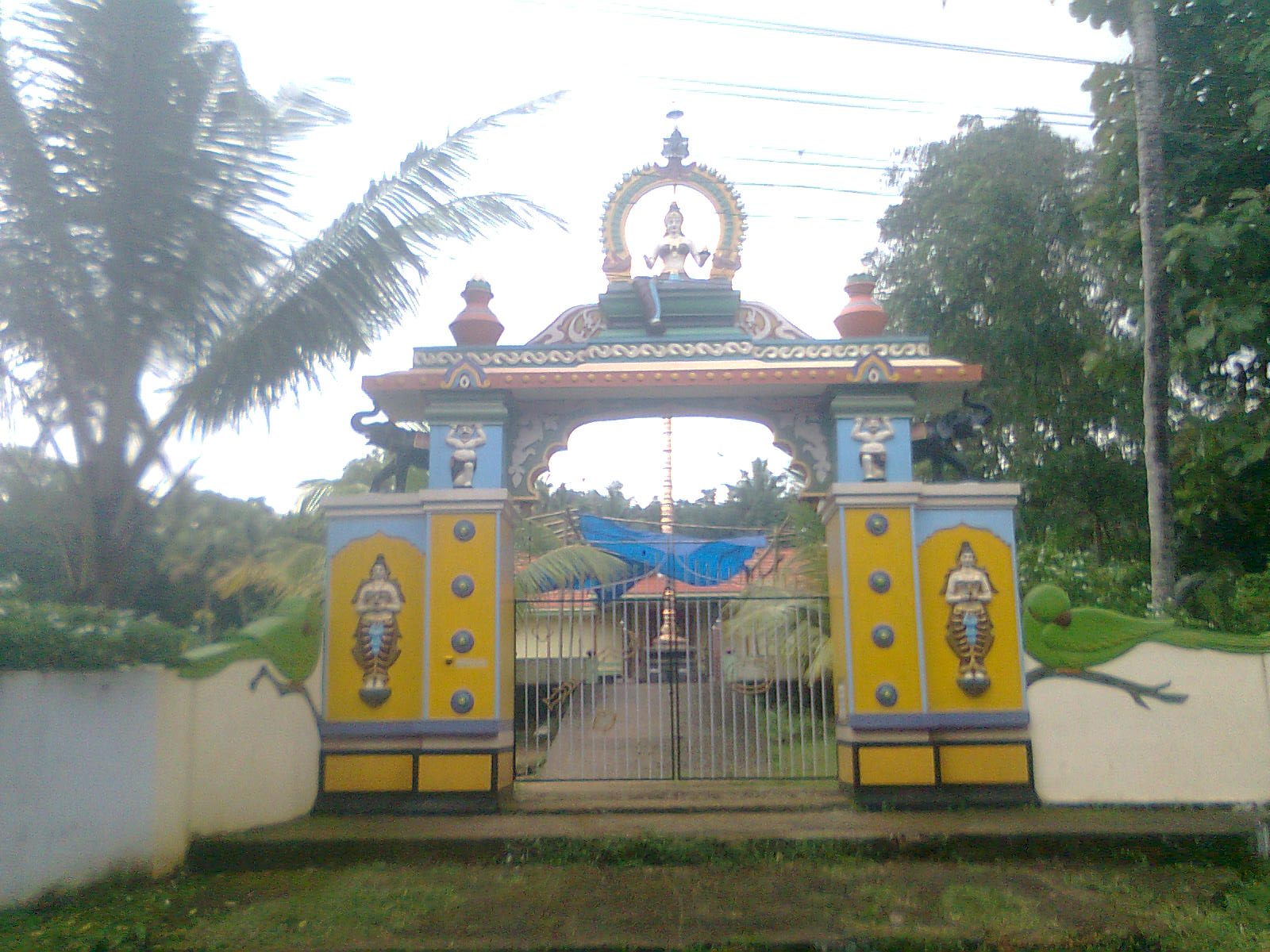

Religion
- Affiliation: Hinduism
- District: Ernakulam

Location
- Location: Angamaly; Elavoor
- State: Kerala
- Country: India
- Interactive map of Puthenkavu Bhagavathy Temple
- Coordinates: 10°1′8″N 76°25′39″E

Website
- http://www.puthenkavubhagavathy.com

Puthenkavu Bhagavathy Temple (Malayalam: പുത്തൻകാവ് ഭഗവതീ ക്ഷേത്രം) is a Hindu temple dedicated to the God Sree Badrakali, located in the village of Elavoor in the state of Kerala, India. It is one of the most important places of worship for Hindus of Kerala. This Temple is famous, because of the widespread allegations all over Kerala with regard to the Elavoor Thookam.
