= Sri Laxmi Venkatesh Temple =

Hindu temple in Kerala, India

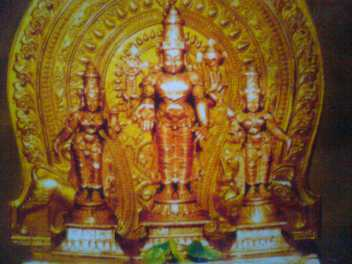
- Sri Laxmi Venkatesha with Sri Devi and Bhudevi

- Location in Kerala

Religion
- Affiliation: Hinduism
- District: Kasargod
- Deity: Venkateswara (Vishnu)
- Festivals: Navarathri, Karthik Punnav

Location
- Location: Kanhangad
- State: Kerala
- Country: India
- Interactive map of Sri Laxmi Venkatesh Temple
- Coordinates: 12°18′32″N 75°5′46″E

Architecture
- Creator: Srimad Bhuvanendra Tirtha and his followers
- Completed: 1865 A.D.

The Sri Laxmi Venkatesh Temple is foremost temple of Gowda Saraswatha Brahmins in and around Kanhangad.

The prathishta ceremonies began in 1864 A.D. and in 1865 A.D. on Akshaya Trithiya the prathishta of main deity Sri Laxmi Venkatesha was completed by the divine hands of Srimad Bhuvanendra Thirtha Swamiji. The idol of Laxmi Venkatesha of Innoli was handed over to people of Kanhangad by Srimad Bhuvanendra Thirtha of Kashi Mutt. The temple also have Prathishta of Mahamaya, Garuda, Ganesha, Mahalaxmi, Hanuman, Rama with Sita and Lakshmana, Sharada Mandir, Naga and the Utsava idol of Sreenivasa with Sridevi and Bhudevi.

== History of Sri Laxmi Venkatesh Temple ==
The Temple was dream for people of Kanhangad at those times as the nearest temple of G.S.Brahmins were situated at Kasargod. So they kindly requested then Guru of Kashi Mutt to offer a Temple for them. Guru Sri Bhuvanendra Thirtha blessed the people of Kanhangad with idol of Laxmi Venkatesh of Innoli which the people of Innoli gave to him earlier as they were in such poverty that they were not able to offer Nivedya to God. The Chowguli families that is, the four families attributed to construction of the temple consisted of families of Subraya Kamath, Ramachandra Nayak, Narayana Kamath and Sheshagiri Kamath. It is said that the whole construction of temple was by the people of the community without any workers outside the community. Subraya Kamath's Family offered the land for the temple. Thus his family becomes the Muli family who are believed to inform the people the god's will through oracle referred as Darshan.

As the Innoli people returned the deity to Swamiji due to large amount of Naivedya which they were not able to offer, Swamiji is believed to offer special prayers so that he had requested God to be satisfied with whatever Naivedya the people of Kanhangad are able to offer and give quadruple amount of blessings in return.

== Main festivals ==
Foremost festivals at this temple are Navarathri, Karthik Pournami and Bhajana Sapthaha.

== See also ==
=== Goud Saraswat Brahmin ===
- Goud Saraswat Brahmin
- Goud Saraswat Brahmins of Cochin
- List of Goud Saraswat Brahmins
- GSB Temples in Kerala

=== Maths Followed By Goud Saraswat Brahmin ===
- Kashi Math
- Gokarna Math
- Shri Gaudapadacharya Math
