= Cheruthazham Sree Kunninmathilakam Mahadeva Temple =

Hindu temple in Kannur district, Kerala, India

Sree Kunninmathilakam Mahadeva Temple is situated at Cheruthazham in Kannur, Kerala. The old name of this temple is Sree Kunninmathilakam Shiva Temple. Shiva of this temple is known as 'Sree Kunninmathilakathappan'. Sree Kunninmathilakathappan is worshipped as Lord Dakshinamoorthy in the morning, Lord Kirathamoorthy at noon, and Lord Umamaheshwara in the evening by devotees.

== History ==
According to local tradition, during the Treta Yuga, Lord Anjaneya, an envoy of Lord Sree Rama, was entrusted with installing a deity of Lord Mahadeva at Rameswaram. According to the tradition, Anjaneya installed one part of the deity during his journey but arrived at Rameswaram after Rama had already installed a clay deity. Rama is said to have imparted the remaining life force to the clay deity, which was situated in Dhanushkodi.

The temple is traditionally regarded as a place of religious significance, and accounts state that Hindu deities and saints worshipped the deity at the site. During the Kali Yuga, approximately six Brahmin families are said to have constructed the temple's main sanctum and worshipped the deity in three forms at different times of the day: Lord Dakshina Murthi in the morning, Lord Kiratha Murthi at noon, and Lord Uma Maheswar in the evening.

According to accounts of the temple's history, portions of the temple were later damaged or destroyed, reportedly as a result of neglect and foreign invasions. During the 1980s, the families of the temple trustees and local devotees began renovation work.

An astrological consultation was conducted at the temple from 7 to 13 March 2011, after which various remedial and renovation works were proposed. A committee was subsequently formed to oversee efforts to preserve the temple. Planned or completed renovation work has included the main sanctum, the Namaskara Mandapam, the four-sided structure surrounding the sanctum (nalambalam), the temples dedicated to Lord Vigneshar and Lord Subrahmanya, and the Saraswathi Mandapa.

== Renovation ==
A committee was formed to oversee efforts to preserve the temple, and renovation work was subsequently initiated. The planned renovations include the main sanctum sanctorum, the Namaskara Mandapam, the four-sided structure surrounding the sanctum (nalambalam), the temples dedicated to Lord Vigneshar and Lord Subrahmanya, and the Saraswathi Mandapa.

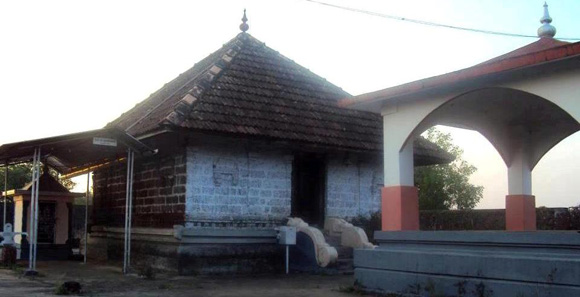
Cheruthazham Sree Kunninmathilakam Mahadeva Temple
