= Uravappara Temple =

Sree Subramanya Swami Temple Uravappara
- ഉറവപ്പാറ ശ്രീസുബ്രഹ്മണ്യ സ്വാമി ക്ഷേത്രം
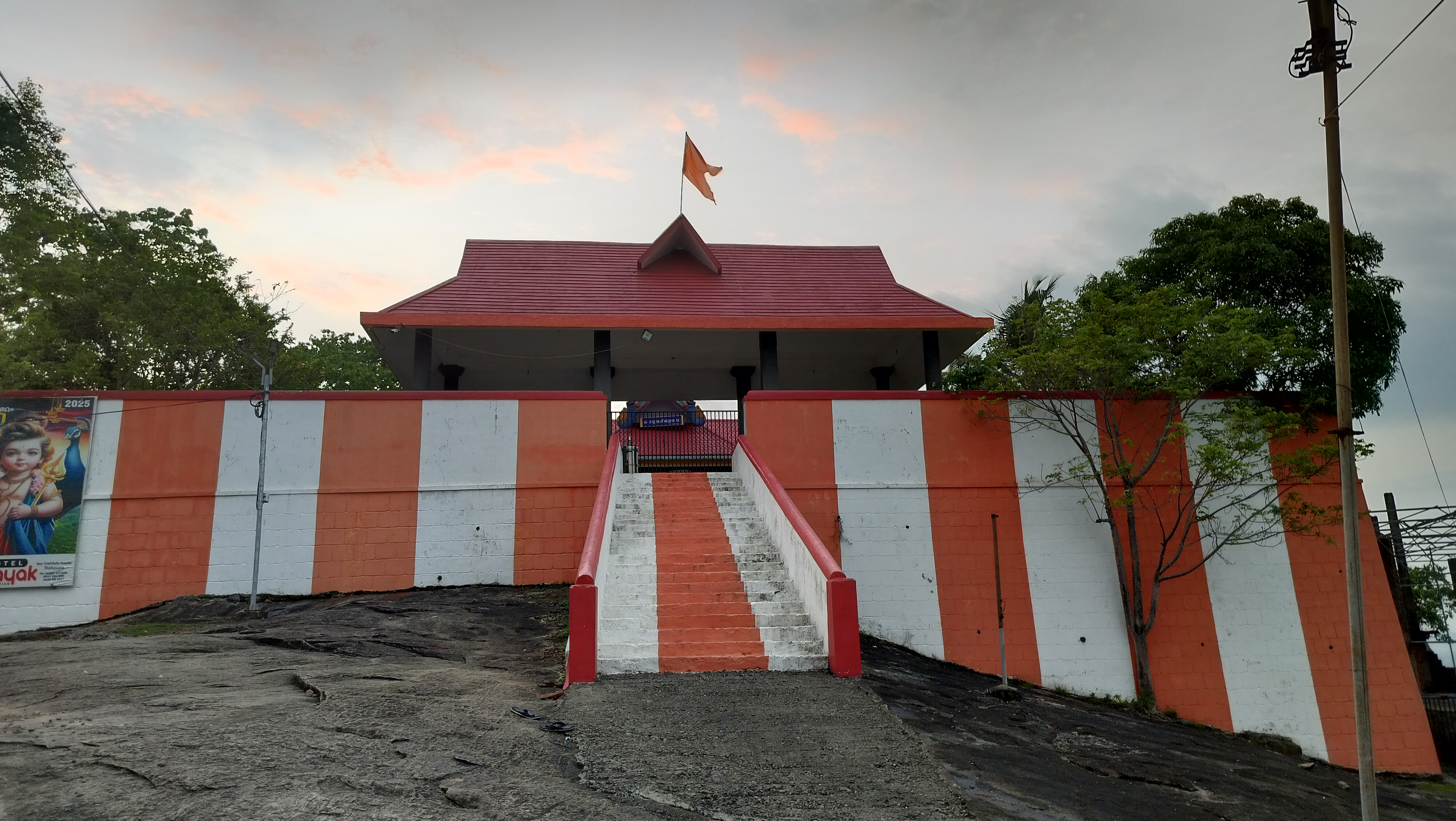
- Uravappara Temple

- Uravappara Subramanya Swamy Temple, Thodupuzha, Idukki, Kerala

Religion
- Affiliation: Hinduism
- District: Idukki
- Deity: Kartikeya as Bala Subramanya
- Festival: Thaipooyam

Location
- Location: Olamattom, Thodupuzha
- State: Kerala
- Country: India
- Coordinates: 9°52′41.4″N 76°42′55.2″E

Architecture
- Type: Traditional Kerala style

Specifications
- Temple: One
- Elevation: 141.68 m (465 ft)

Sree Subramanya Swami Temple, also known by the name 'Malayala Palani' (Palani of Kerala), is located in Olamattom near Thodupuzha in Idukki district in the Indian state of Kerala. It is situated at a height of 500 ft (150 m) above mean sea level. Lord Muruga presides there in the form 'Bala Subramanya'.

The legend has it that the idol here is a self-born one. Pandavas, the renowned heroes in the great Indian epic Mahabharata along with their spouse Draupadi had a sojourn here during their twelve years exile. At present, three big boulders can be seen atop of the rocks which is believed to the three stands of a rock oven used by the Pandavas for cooking purposes. When a shortage of water occurred, Bhima, the mightiest among Pandavas forcibly applied his foot on the hard rock which produced an elegant spring. There are varied opinions regarding the name 'Uravappara'. Some say that the pond produced by the force of Bhima is Uravappara. While some other believe that the temple got its name from the 'Abhishekatheertham' that flows down from the rocks.

== Festivals ==
The annual festival of the temple is hosted in the Malayalam month of 'Makaram' (January/February). Salt and Pepper are the two important offerings to the deity.
