= Makaliyam Sreeramaswamy Temple =

Hindu temple in Ernakulam district, Kerala

- Makaliyam Sreeramaswamy Temple, Irumpanam, in Kerala

Religion
- Affiliation: Hinduism
- District: Ernakulam
- Deity: Rama

Location
- Location: Irumpanam, Kochi
- State: Kerala
- Country: India
- Coordinates: 9°57′46.6″N 76°21′32.8″E

Architecture
- Type: Architecture of Kerala

Specifications
- Temple: One
- Elevation: 33.32 m (109 ft)

The Makaliyam Sreeramaswamy Temple is a temple of the Hindu god Rama at Irumpanam in Kochi, Kerala, India. It is said to have been built by the Chera Dynasty.
