= Chenkal =

- village
- Location in Kerala, India Chenkal (India)
- Coordinates: 8.3653°N 77.1075°E
- Country: India
- State: Kerala
- District: Thiruvananthapuram
- Talukas: Neyyattinkara

Government
  - Body: Gram panchayat

Population (2001)
  - Total: 35,992

Languages
  - Official: Malayalam, English
- Time zone: UTC+5:30 (IST)
- PIN: 695122
- Vehicle registration: KL-19

Chenkal is a village in Thiruvananthapuram district in the state of Kerala, India. Until the land-reforms ordinance enacted by the Communist regime in the 1950s, the village formed part of the estate of the jenmi (Yejamanan) of Kandamath. The ramparts of the medieval Kandamath Palace (Kandamath Madom Thampuran Vaka) and the ruins can still be seen in the area. Maheshwaram Shiva Parvathi temple, which houses the tallest Shiva lingam in the world, having a height of 111 ft, is located in this village.

== Demographics ==
As of 2011 India census, Chenkal had a population of 36,891 with 18,047 males and 18,844 females.
