= Polur Temple, Kozhikode =

Hindu Temple in Kozhikode, Kerala

Coordinates: 11.31402°N 75.83938°E

Polur Subramanya Swamy Temple of Kozhikode, once the capital of Zamorin of India, is one of the area's oldest temples. This temple is located 12 km away from Kozhikode city in the Indian state of Kerala and 3 km away from Parambil Bazar and Muzhikkal. The exact place is Polor in Kuruvattoor Panchayath.

== History of the temple ==
Sree Porlathiri King was the dominant king of this place, providing the area's name. Polurappan (Sree Subramanya Swamy) and Ganapathi, Vettakkorumakan, Ayyapan and Devi are worshiped here. Subramanya Swamy faces to the west, like in the famous Palani Temple. Polurappan statute sits as if he is meditating or writing.

== Festivals ==
People celebrate Thaipuyam as the birth day of Subramanya Swamy. It is the main festival of this temple, which takes place in the month of Makaram.

Just outside the temple is a Sarppa Kavu and Sarppa pooja is done there once ina year.
