= Karakonam =

- village
- Location in Kerala, India Karakonam (India)
- Coordinates: 8°23′11.46″N 77°10′10.25″E
- Country: India
- State: Kerala
- District: Thiruvananthapuram

Government
  - Body: Gram panchayat

Languages
  - Official: Malayalam, English, Tamil
- Time zone: UTC+5:30 (IST)
- Vehicle registration: KL-19

Karakonam is a town in Kunnathukal, Perumkadavila Block Panchayat, of Thiruvananthapuram district in the Indian state of Kerala. It is located around 30 km from Thiruvananthapuram. It is home to the Dr.Somervell Memorial CSI Medical college

== Politics ==
The panchayat of Kunnathukal
