= Karimpuzha, Palakkad =

- Neighbourhood
- Karimpuzha, Palakkad, Kerala
- Coordinates: 10°55′16″N 76°25′12″E
- Country: India
- State: Kerala
- District: Palakkad
- Elevation: 77.59 m (254.6 ft)

Languages
  - Official: Malayalam, English
  - Speech: Malayalam, English
- Time zone: UTC+5:30 (IST)
- PIN: 679513
- Other Neighbourhoods: Sreekrishnapuram, Mannarkkad
- LS: Palakkad
- VS: Ottapalam

Karimpuzha is a gram panchayat in the Palakkad district, in the state of Kerala, India. It is a local government organisation that serves the villages of Karimpuzha-I and Karimpuzha-II.

== Important Organizations ==
- Lt.Col.Niranjan Memorial I.T.I., Elambulassery

== Demographics ==
As of 2011 India census, Karimpuzha-I had a population of 19,287 with 9,189 males and 10,098 females.

As of 2011 India census, Karimpuzha-II had a population of 12,830 with 6,137 males and 6,693 females.

== Elambulassery ==
Elambulassery is a small village near Sreekrishnapuram in Karimpuzha Panchayath. It is about 33 km from Palakkad. The village is surrounded by Mannarkkad, Ottappalam, Perinthalmanna and Attappadi.
