= Thalappoli =

Hindu ritual in Kerala

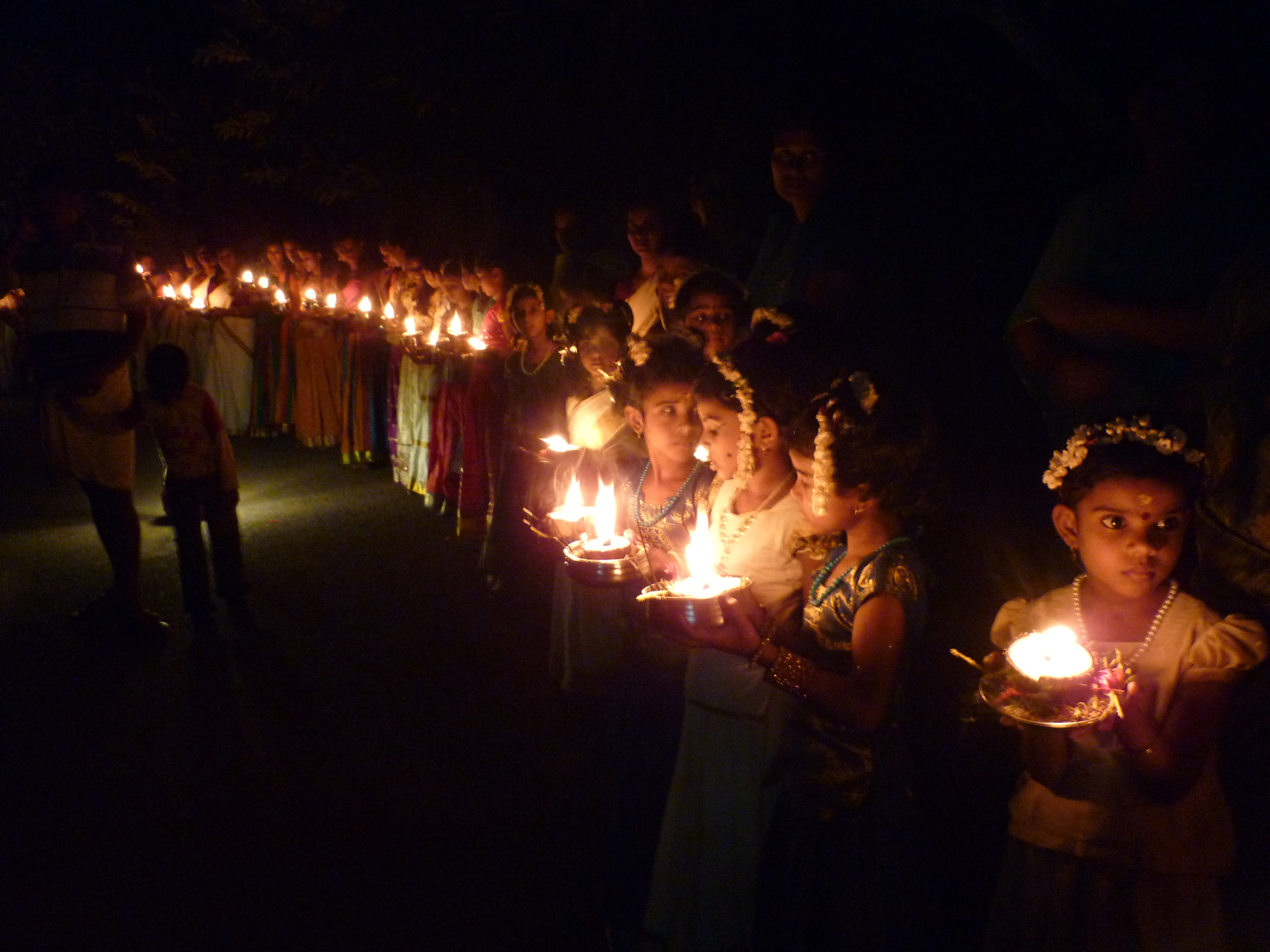
Thalappoli

Thalappoli is a ritual ceremony performed as a vow in Hindu temples in Kerala, India. It is also performed to usher the bride and groom to the wedding hall and the special guests to public events.

== Ritual ==
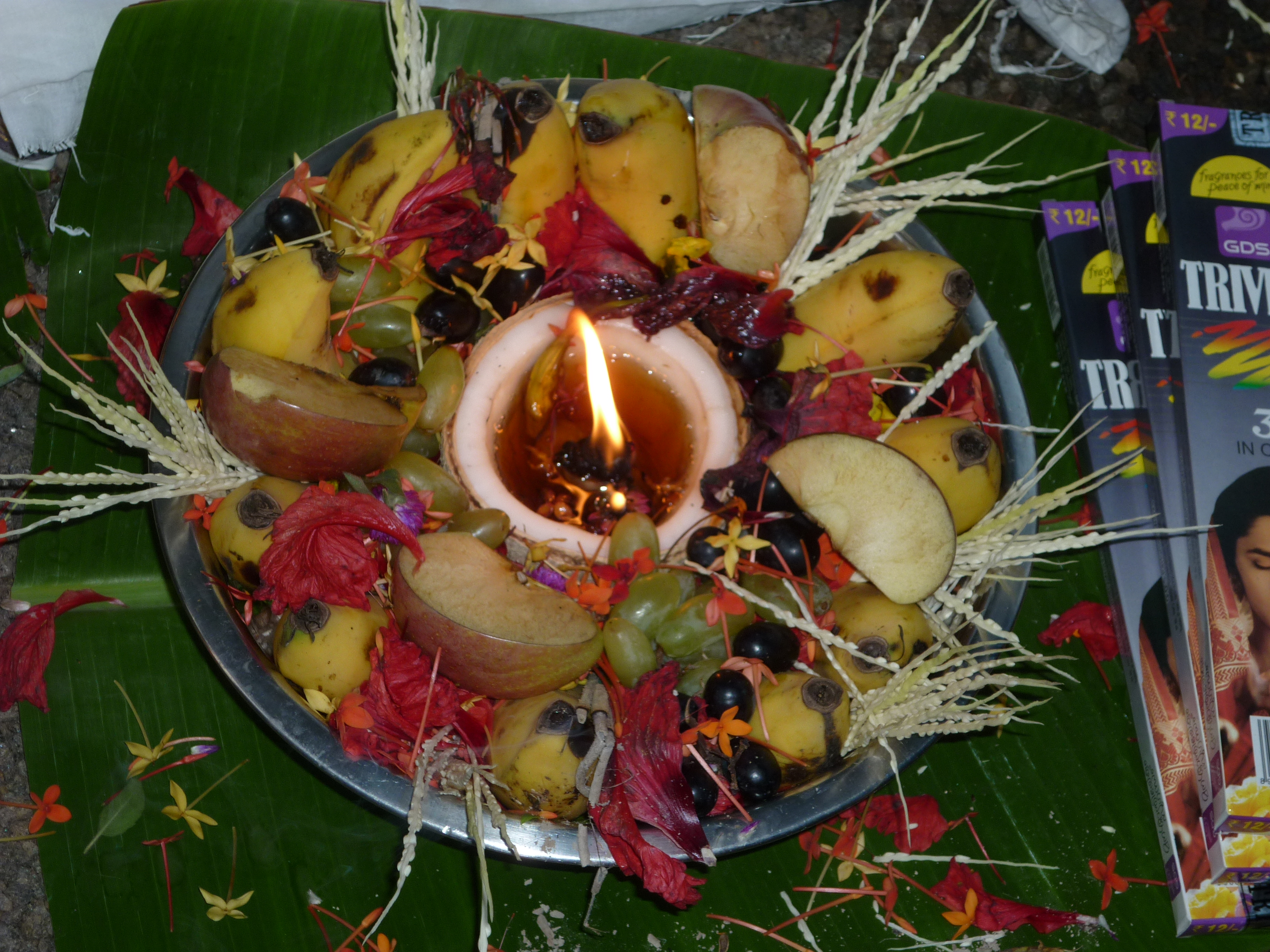
thalam

Thalappoli is a ritual ceremony performed as a vow in Hindu temples in Kerala, India. Bathed and dressed in beautiful traditional clothes and Kerala ornaments, the women, mainly girls, line up with holding a thalam (a metal plate) in their hands filled with fresh paddy, flowers, rice, coconut (usually broken into two pieces), a lighted lamp and go around the temple with kurava (traditional form of sound), shouts and playing of instruments. This was regularly practiced in the temples of bhagavathy (Bhadrakali).

Thalappoli festivalis observed in many Hindu temples across Kerala. some noted temples include Kodungallur Bhagavathy Temple, Pattupurackal Bhagavathy Temple, Chengannur Mahadeva Temple, Thalappoli performed by virgins girls is an important ceremony in Attukal Temple. Pilleru thalappoli, the thalappoli by kids is performed at Guruvayur temple. In Kottankulangara Devi Temple in Chavara, there is a special ritual where men dress up as women and perform thalappoli.

== Origin ==
In Kerala Hindu culture, it is considered auspicious to see the ashta mangalyas (eight blessed elements) - a mirror, a lamp, a vessel filled with water, a new garment, akshatham (the combination of rice and paddy), gold, a girl, and Kurava (a sound that signifies happiness). It is believed that its simplified form was transformed into talappoli.

There is another argument that 'Thalappoli' is related to Buddhism and Jainism that existed in Kerala.

== Non-ritual ==
Now Thalapoli is also performed to usher the bride and groom to the wedding hall and the special guests to public events.

== See also ==
- Puja thali
