= Pattupurackal Bhagavathy Temple =

Hindu temple in Kerala, India

- Kattampack Pattupurackal Bhagavathy Temple
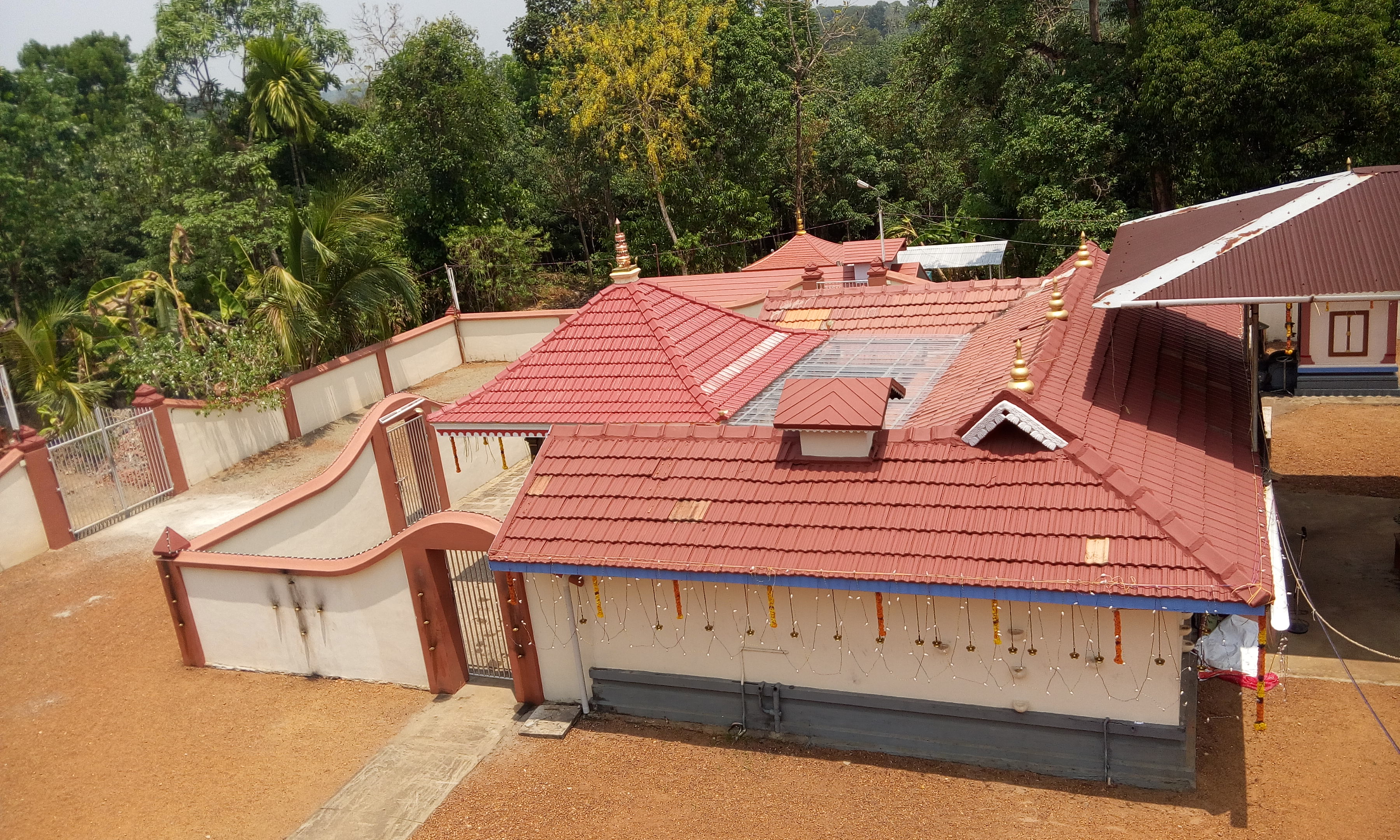
- Pattupurackal Bhagavathy Temple

- Pattupurackal Bhagavathy Temple, Njeezhoor, Kottayam, Kerala

Religion
- Affiliation: Hinduism
- District: Kottayam
- Deity: Bhadrakali
- Governing body: NSS Karayogam No 336

Location
- Location: Vadakkenirappu Njeezhoor
- State: Kerala
- Country: India
- Interactive map of Pattupurackal Bhagavathy Temple
- Coordinates: 9°47′53″N 76°32′52″E

Architecture
- Type: Architecture style of Kerala

Specifications
- Temple: One
- Elevation: 52.32 m (172 ft)

Pattupurackal Bhagavathy Temple (also known as Kattampack Kizhakkum Bhagam Pattupurackal Bhagavathy temple) is an ancient (dating back to the 10th century CE) Bhadrakali temple located in Njeezhoor village, Kottayam, Kerala. It is the only temple in Njeezhoor village where the presiding deity is Bhadrakali. Offering naranga vilakku (Lemon lamp) and neivilakku (Ghee lamp) on every Tuesday and Friday is very significant in this temple. The nearest towns are Kuravilangad and Kaduthuruthy. It is about 6 km and 11 km away from the temple respectively. The last renovation activities of the temple were done on March 19, 2016, with the presence of Kshetra Thantri Brahma Sree Anil Dhivakaran Namboothiri. The temple is managed by NSS Karayaogam Number 336.

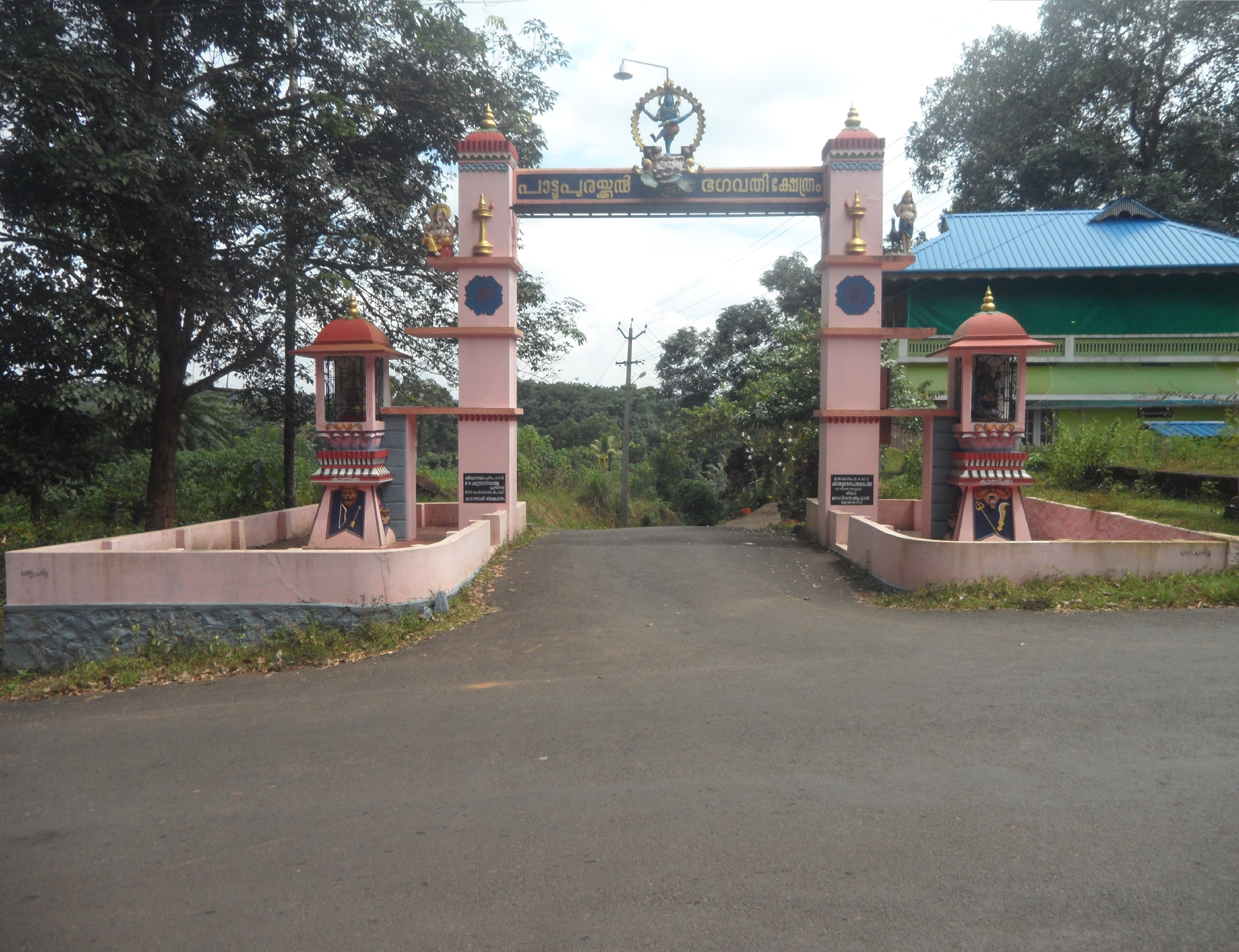
Pattupurackal bhagavathy temple- Entrance Arch

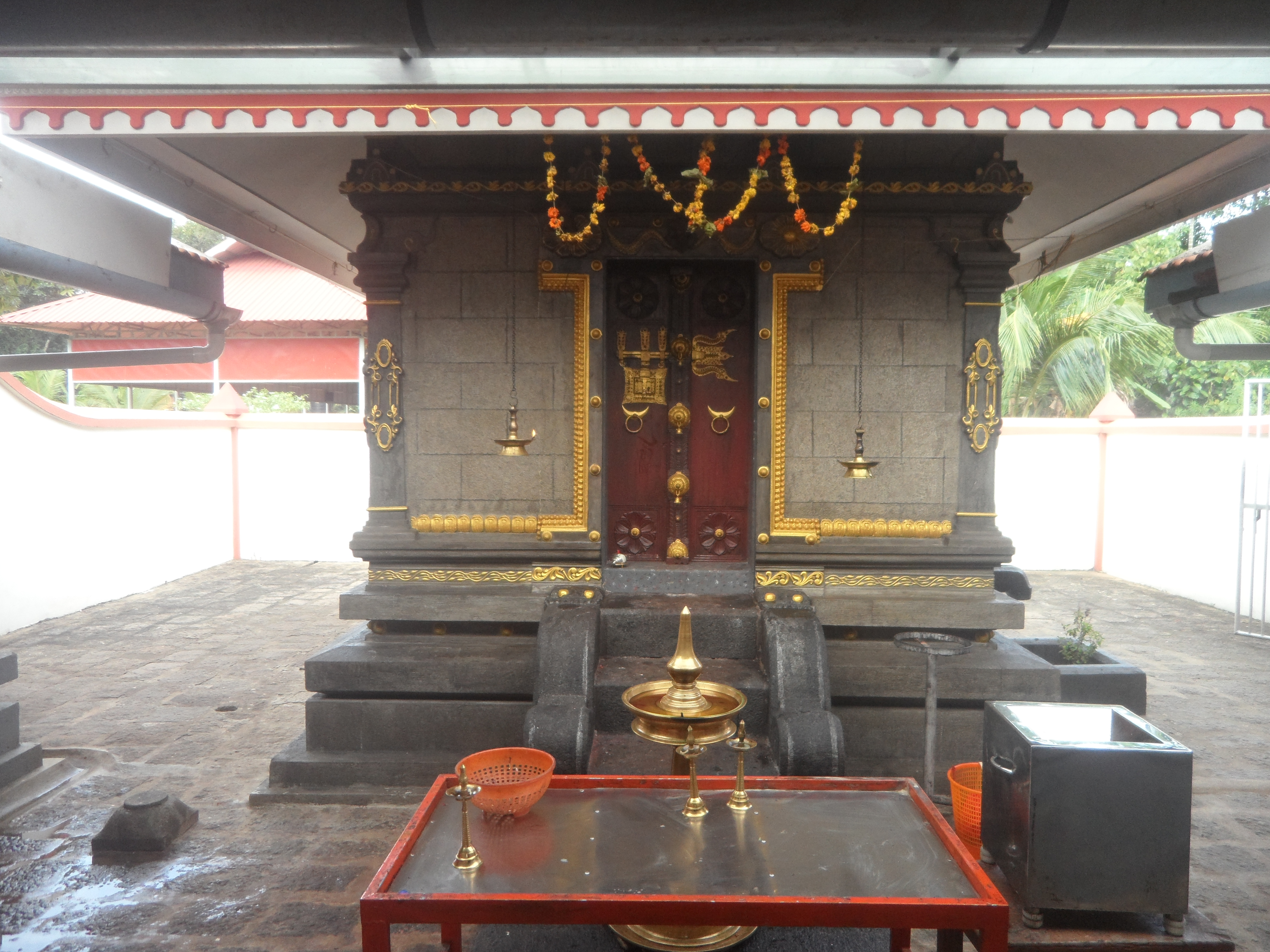
Pattupurackal bhagavathy temple kattampack-Sanctuary view

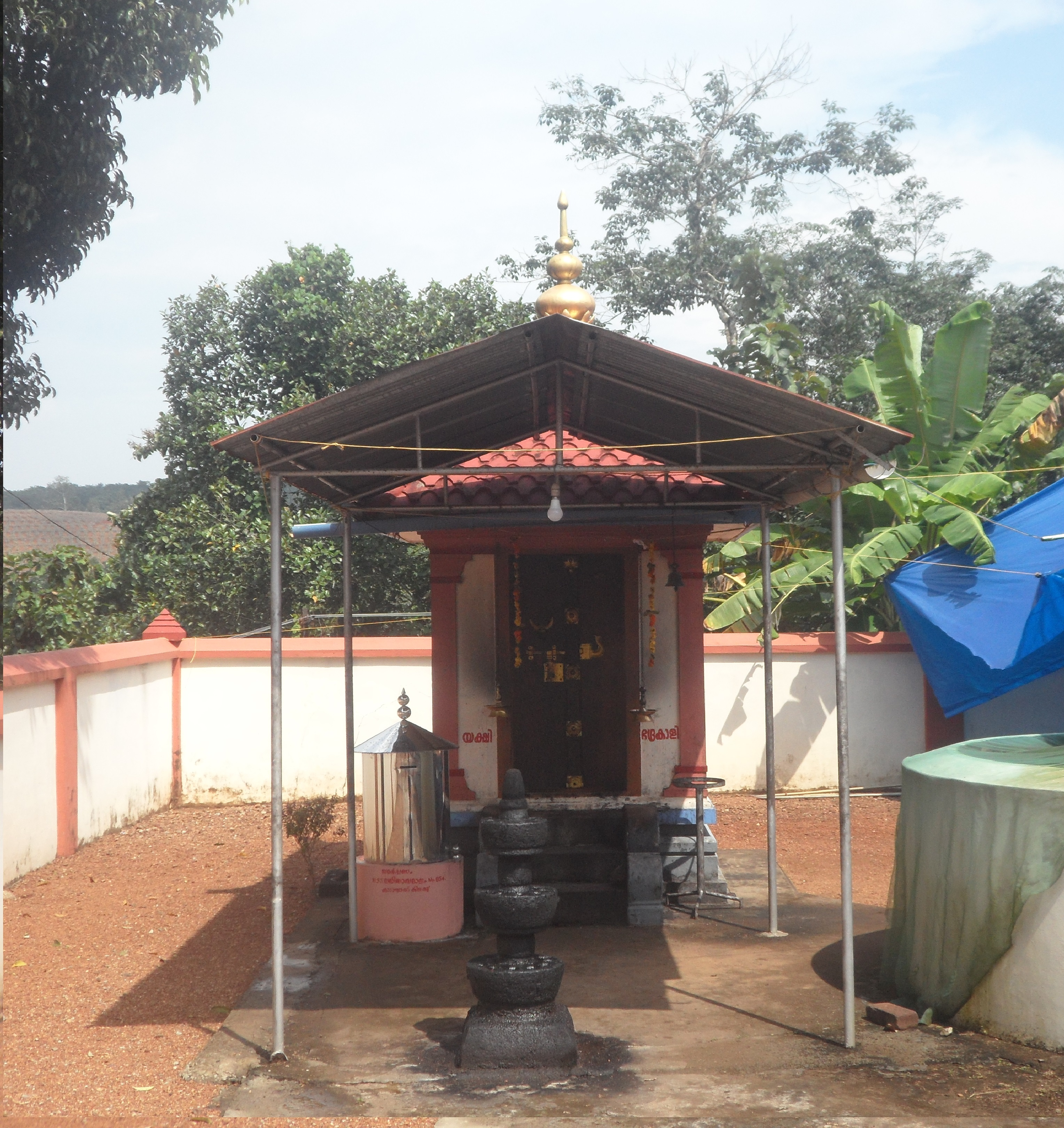
Pattupurackal bhagavathy temple- shrine of subordinate deities

== Priests ==
Kshetra Thantri: Brahma Sree Anil Dhivakaran Namboothiri

Kshetra Melshanthi: Brahma Sree Vinod V N.

== Deities ==
The temple worships Sree Bhadrakali as the presiding deity, based on the Hindu myth that the Bhadrakali is treated as the daughter of Lord Shiva. Yakshi and Bhagavathy are placed here as subordinate deities.

== Festival ==
The annual festival of Pattupurackal Bhagavathy temple is celebrated on every Malayalam month of Meenam. The date is decided based on the Malayalam calendar. Special poojas are performed on those days. It is a 12-day-long festival starting with Pongala. Each day, the festival is organized by each family member as their offering. Thalappoli takes place everyday evening during the annual festival with the retinue of an idol of bhadrakali and chendamelam. This procession requires going around the temple three times. There are different programs to be held during the festival time on temple auditorium. On the morning of the completion day of the annual festival, a big procession starts from the nearest street with the retinue of thalappoli, Chendamelam, shingarimelam, Ammankudam, Kumbakudam, Theyyam, Mayilattam, Shiva Parvathy dance, and also an elephant carrying thidambu. Around noon, the procession reaches the temple. After that, Maha Annadhanam (Food Offering) is held near the temple premises. At night, toward the end of the day, Mudiyettu holds onto the temple ground. The Festival ends with valiya guruthi pooja. There is also celebration conducted in the shrine of subordinate deities on every Malayalam month of Vrichigam.

=== Pongala ===
Pongala in pattupurackal bhagavathy temple celebrated every year during the annual festival. It is on just one day before starting the 12-day annual festival. Pongala is a sweet cooked rice with jaggery, ghee and coconut as well as other ingredients in a small open pot by women for seeking divine blessings. It is a momentous festival for married as well as unmarried women devotees. By offering pongala the women devotees believe that it brings blessings for their husband and children and also brings good life partner to unmarried women. Around 9 am the temple priests lights the hearth and this is passed to every women devotee to light up their hearth for preparing the pad. Around 11 am the pongala devote to temple deity. Women's from the different region come to participate in pongala festival. It is celebrating as the grant in this temple.

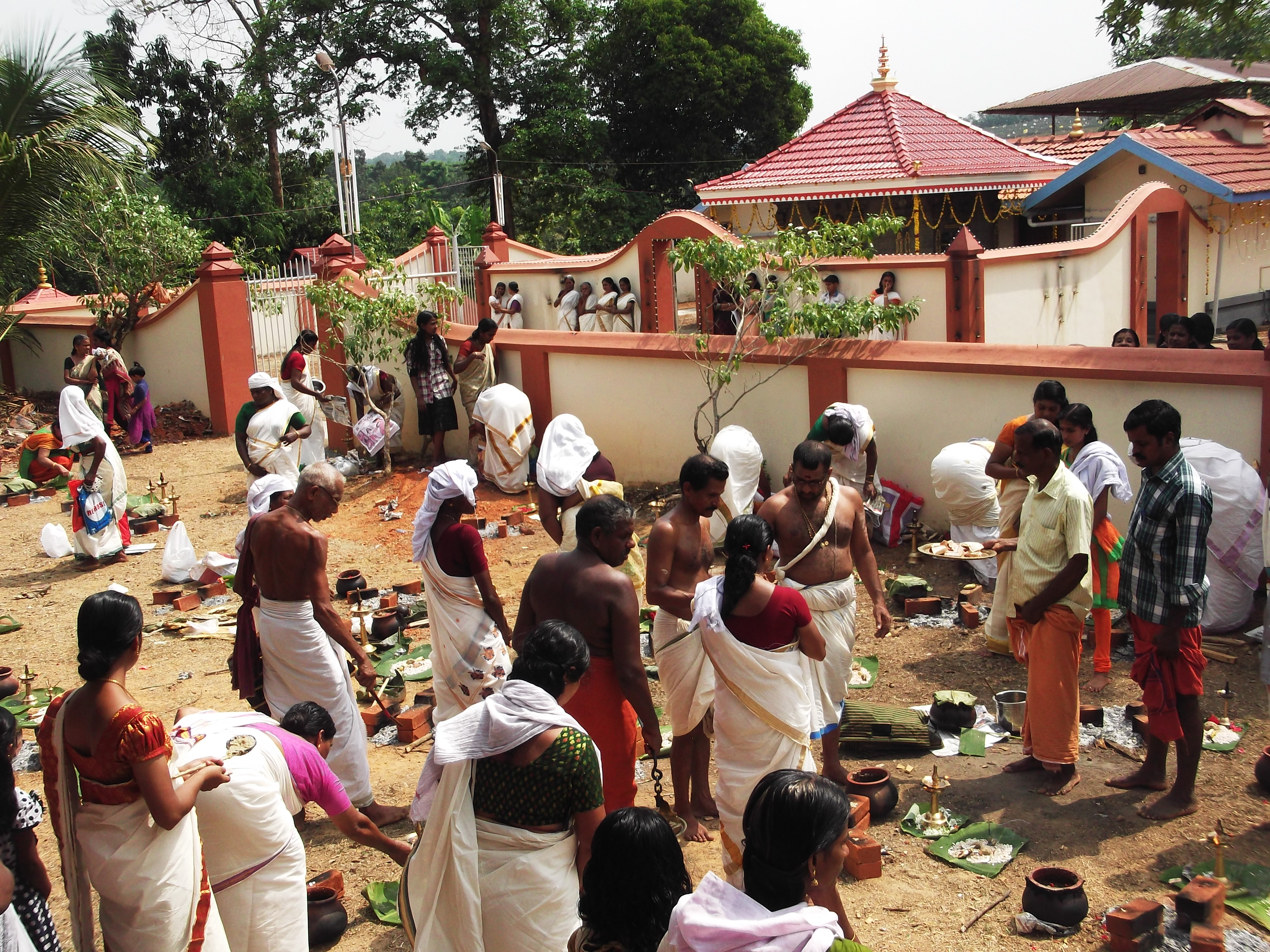
Pongala festival in Pattupurackal Bhagavathy temple kattampack

=== Mudiyettu ===
Mudiyettu in Pattupurackal Bhagavathy temple is celebrating on the completion day night during the annual festival. It is performing on temple ground around 12 am. Mudiyettu is one of the main attraction of the annual festival. Mudiyettu is a ritual dance drama performed in Bhadrakali temple. People from different religion come to watch this.

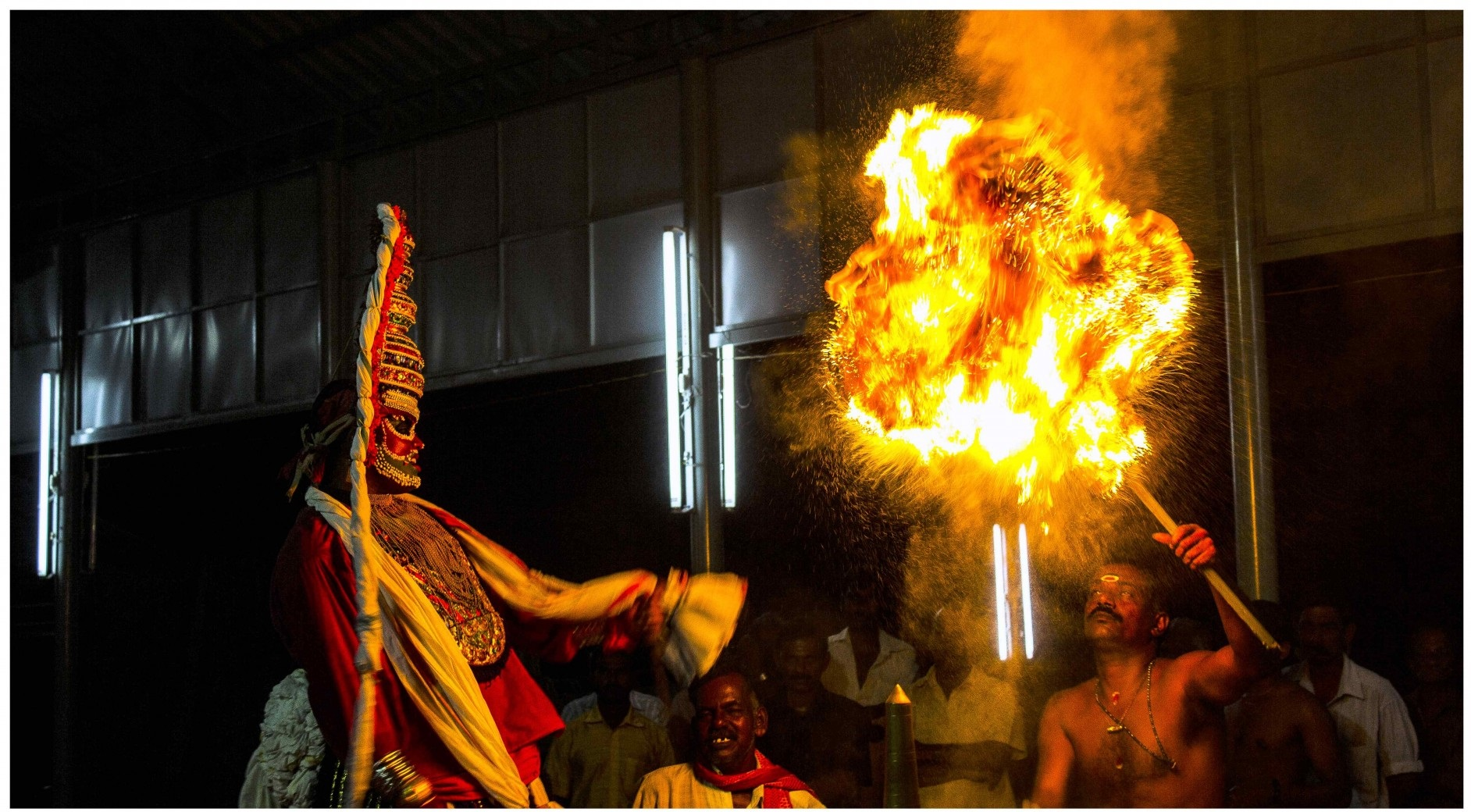
Mudiyettu-Pattupurackal bhagavathy temple kattampack

=== Valiya guruthi ===
Valiya guruthi pooja is performing at night on one day after the 12-day festival. This is the most powerful pooja to remove all obstacles and evil forces against one's life. It is an hour long pooja which is tied to a plantain tree and erected on the center of a 64 cornered frame made up of plantain tree ingredients on the floor. This pooja is accompanied by traditional drums (chenda). The annual festival ends with this guruthi pooja.

=== Other festivals ===
The other festival is Vidhyarambham on the completion day of Navaratri, Ashtadravya Mahaganapathy Homam on Vinayaka Chathurthi, light up lamp inside as well as around temple on Dipavali, Sarvaiswarya pooja on last Friday evening of every Malayalam month, Agandanamajapam on first Sunday of every Malayalam month from 6:30 am to 6:30 pm, Varapodi offering on velutha vavu (Full Moon) day of every month for subordinate deities.

== Temple auditorium ==
The temple also has the facility of the big auditorium to conduct marriage function. It is an open auditorium equipped with light, fan and also sound system. About 500 people can sit inside the auditorium.

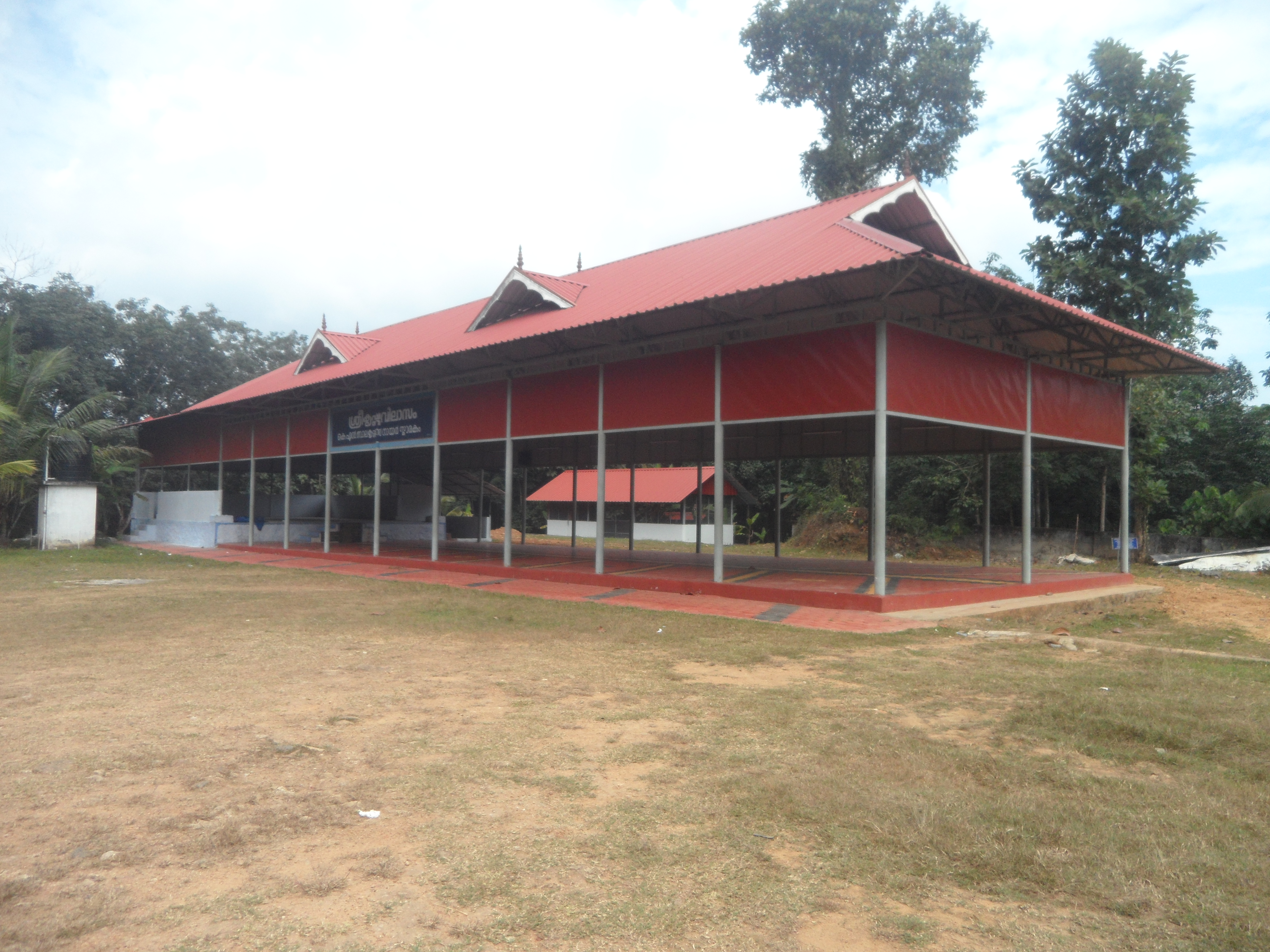
Pattupurackal bhagavathy temple-Auditorium

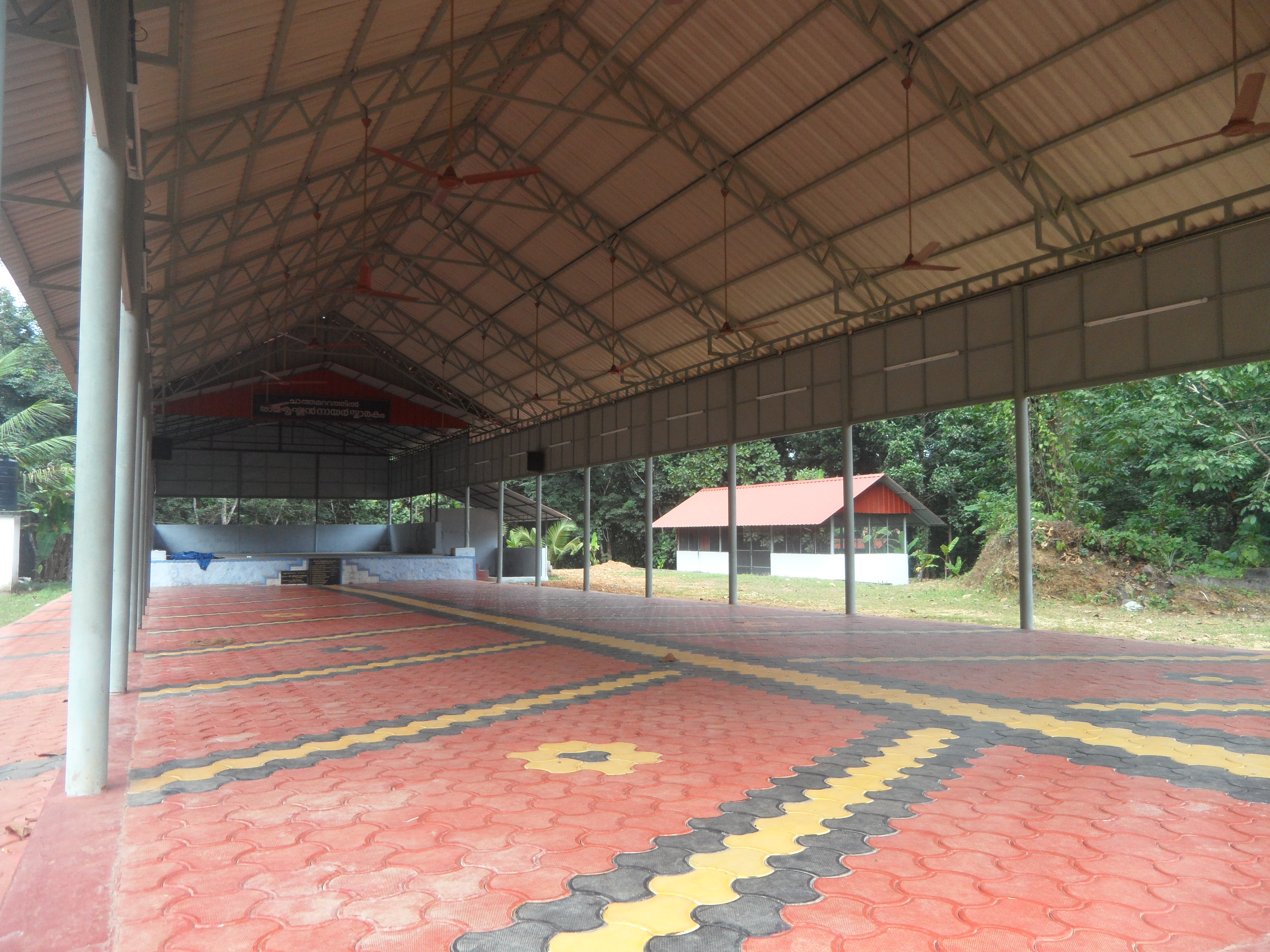
Pattupurackal bhagavathy temple-Auditorium Inside view

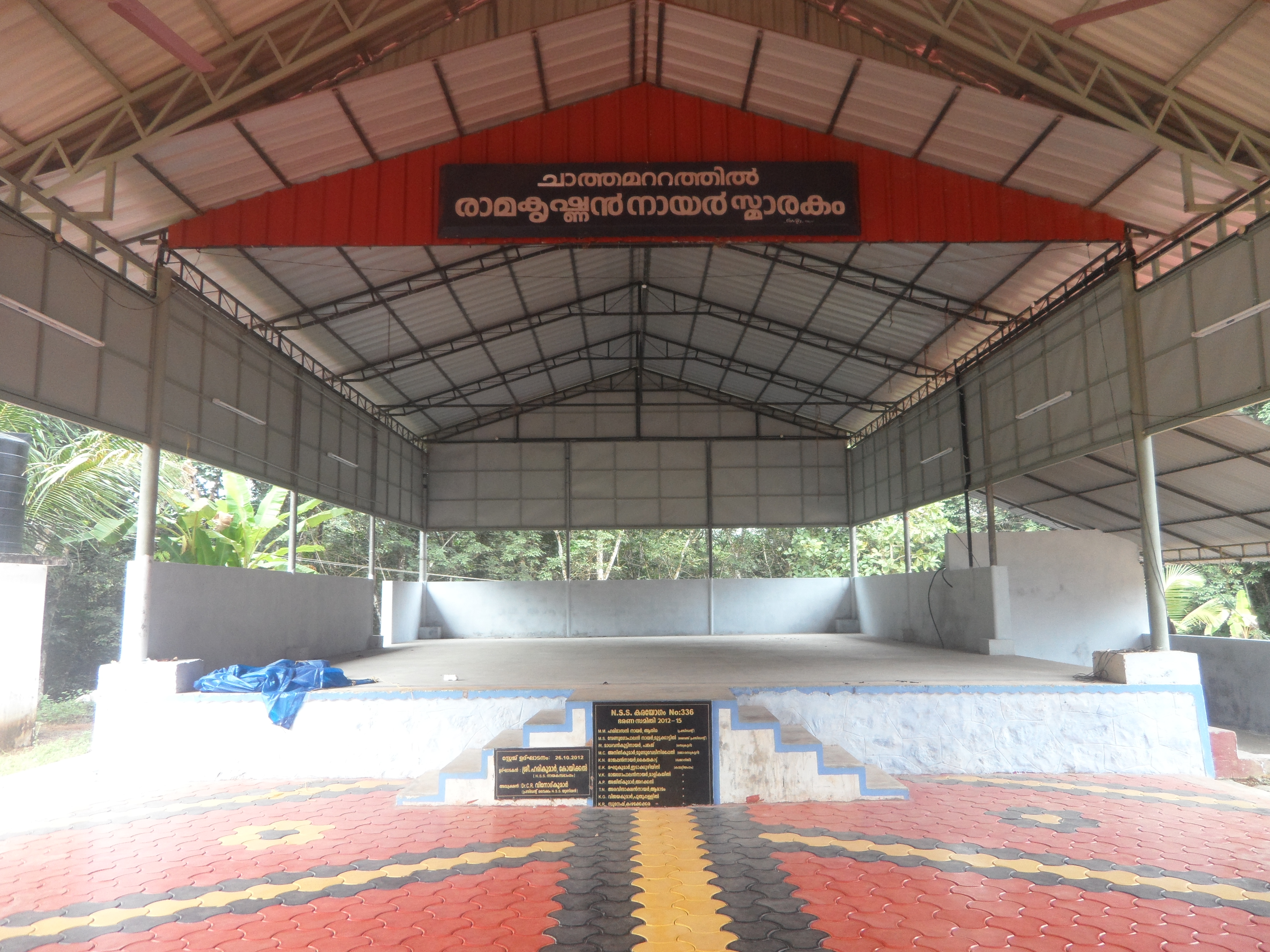
Pattupurackal bhagavathy temple-Auditorium stage

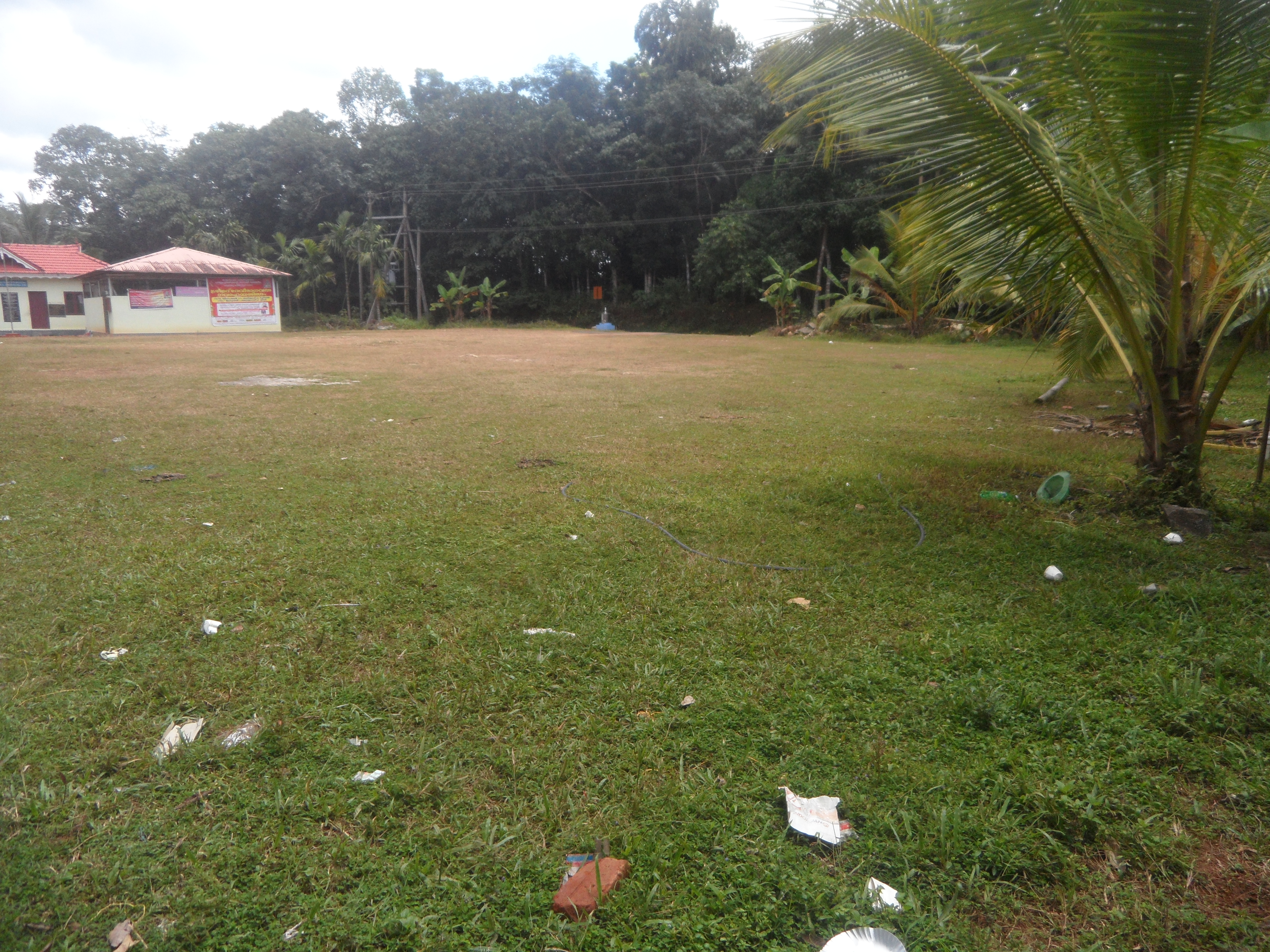
Parking ground-Pattupurackal bhagavathy temple

== Administration ==
The temple is managed by NSS Karayogam (Reg No:336). The karayogam has elected a committee to run the activities of the temple. It has 11 members including president, secretary, vice president, Joint Secretary, Treasurer and committee members.

== Photos ==
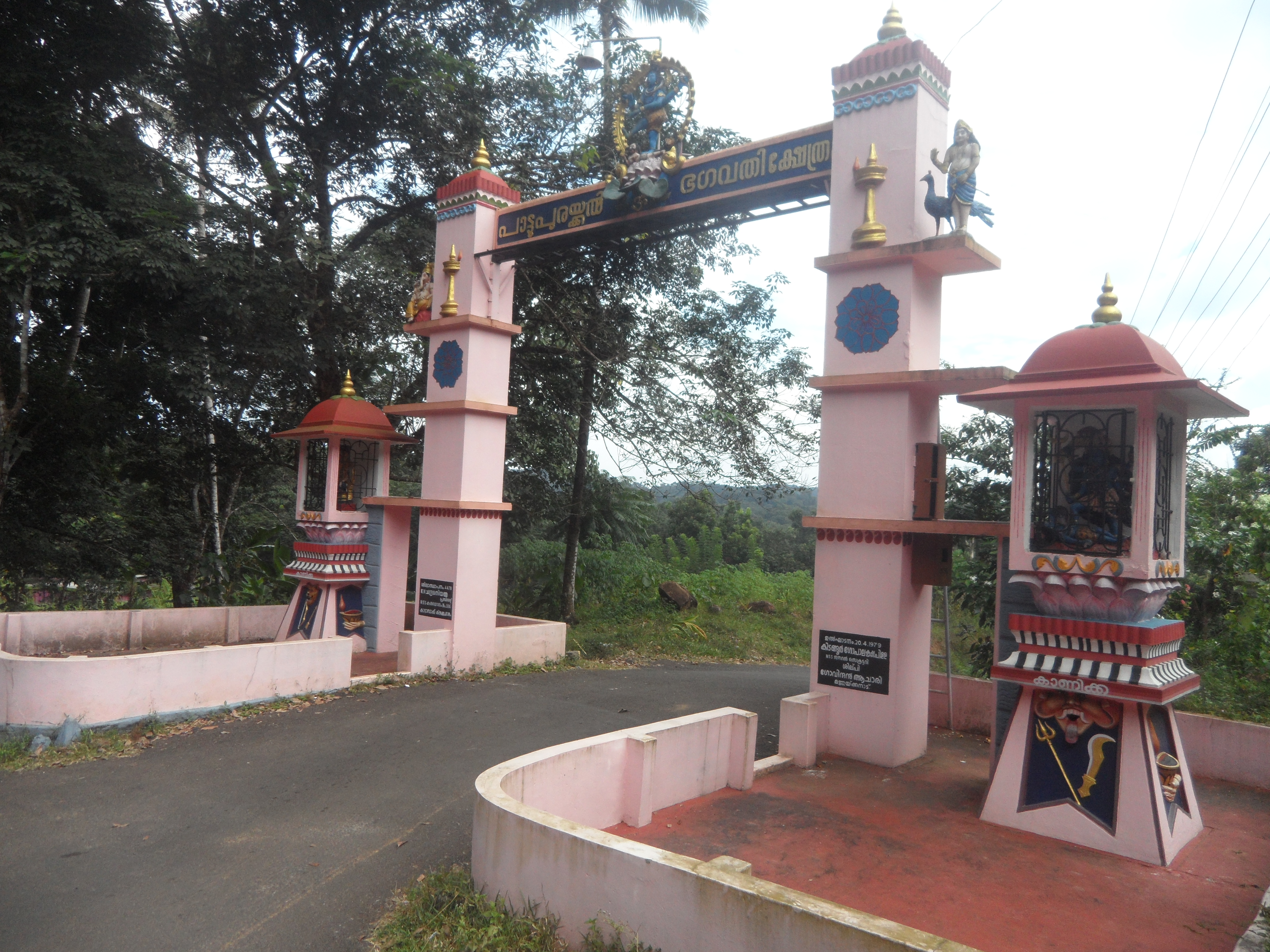
Pattupurackal bhagavathy temple- Entry arch

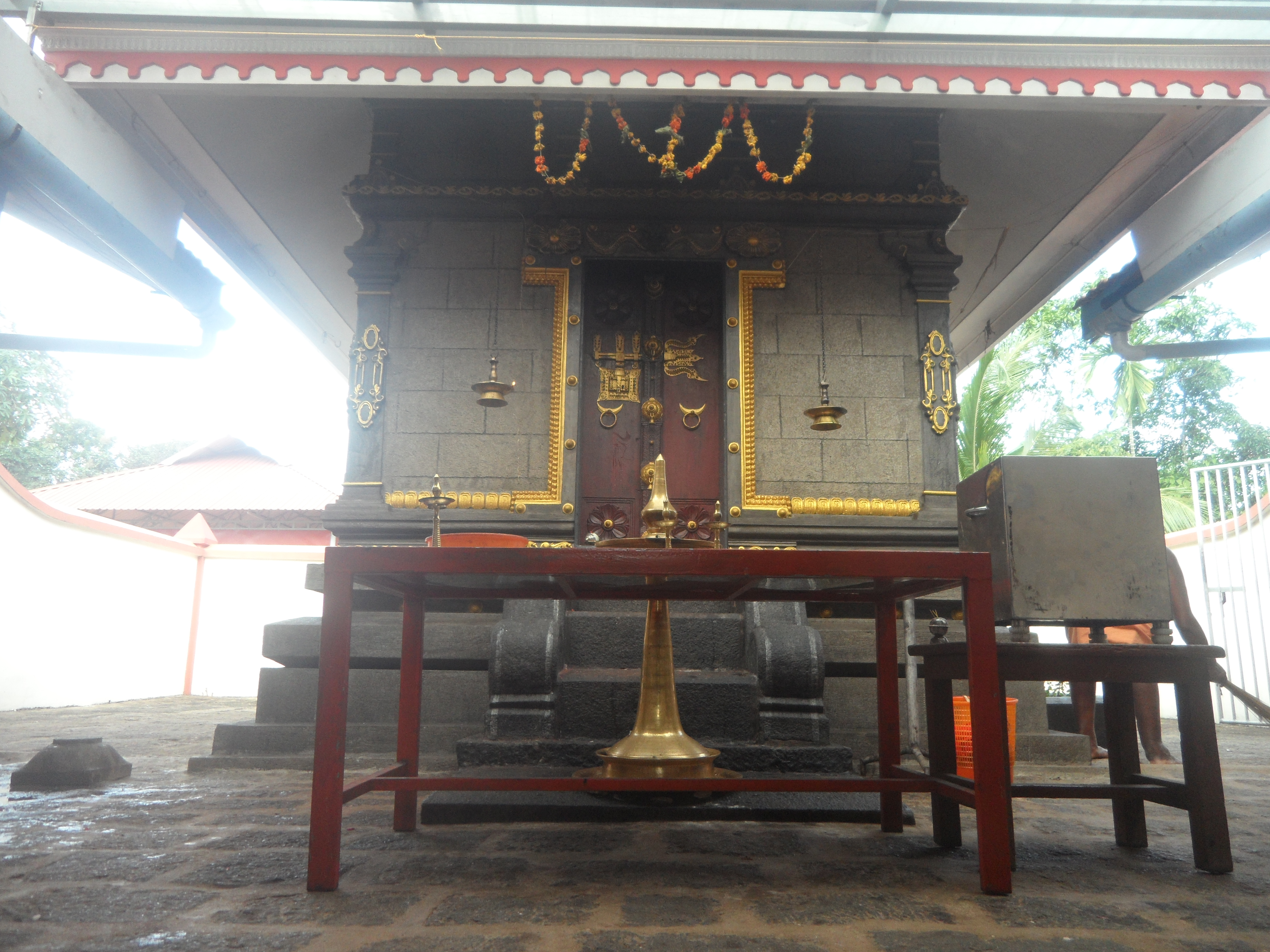
Pattupurackal bhagavathy temple- Sanctuary view 1

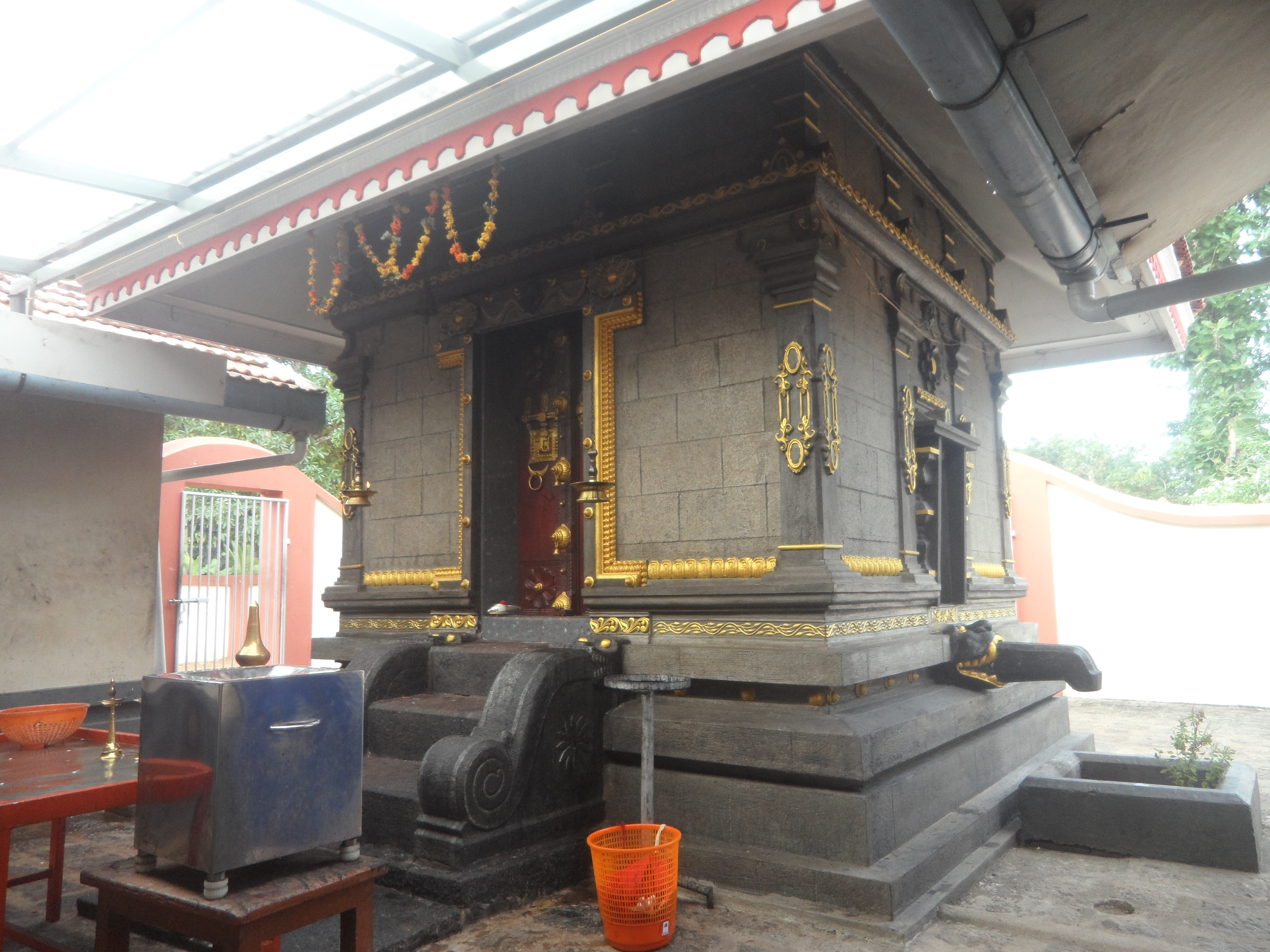
Pattupurackal bhagavathy temple- Sanctuary view 2

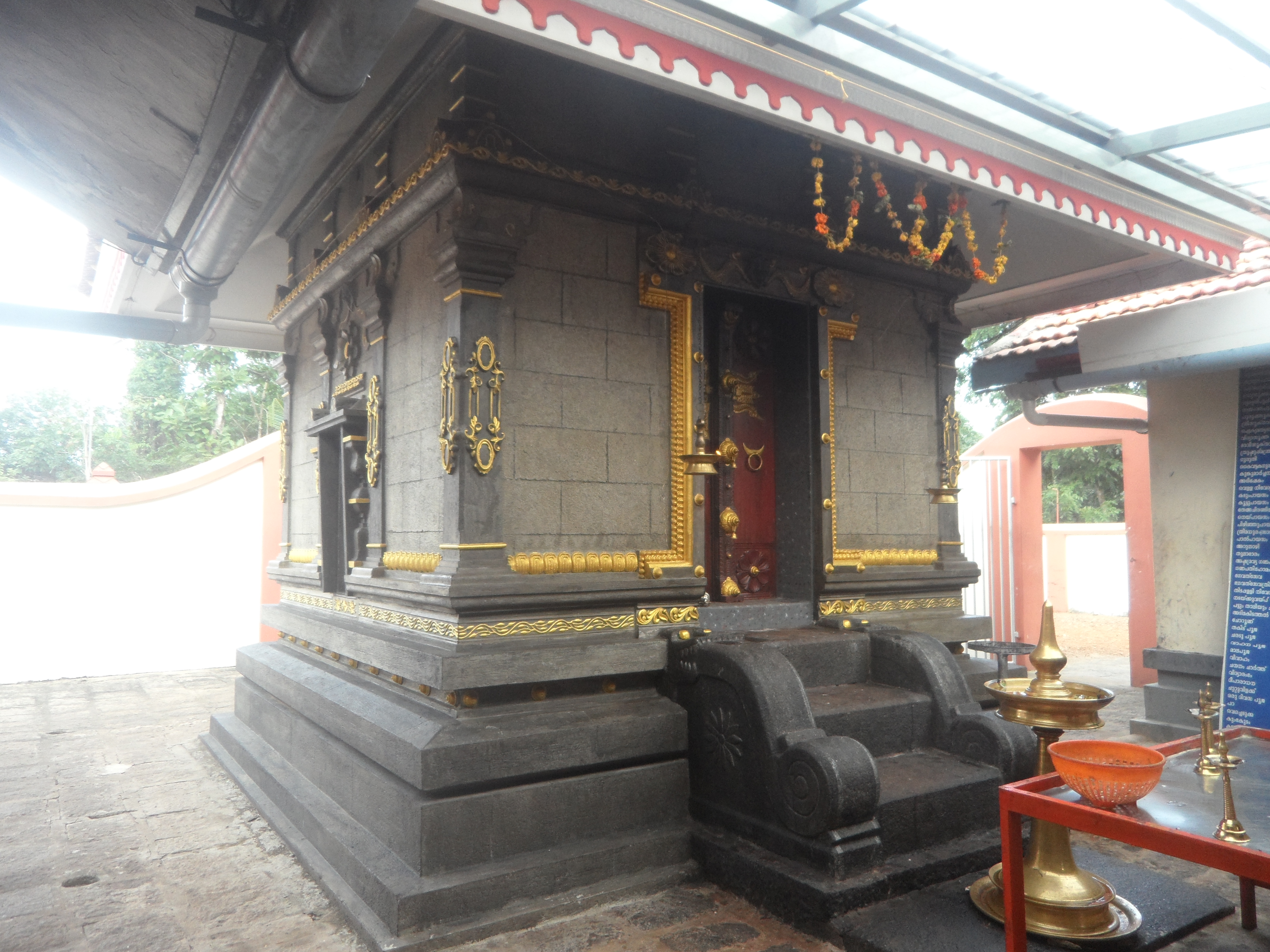
Pattupurackal bhagavathy temple- Sanctuary view 3

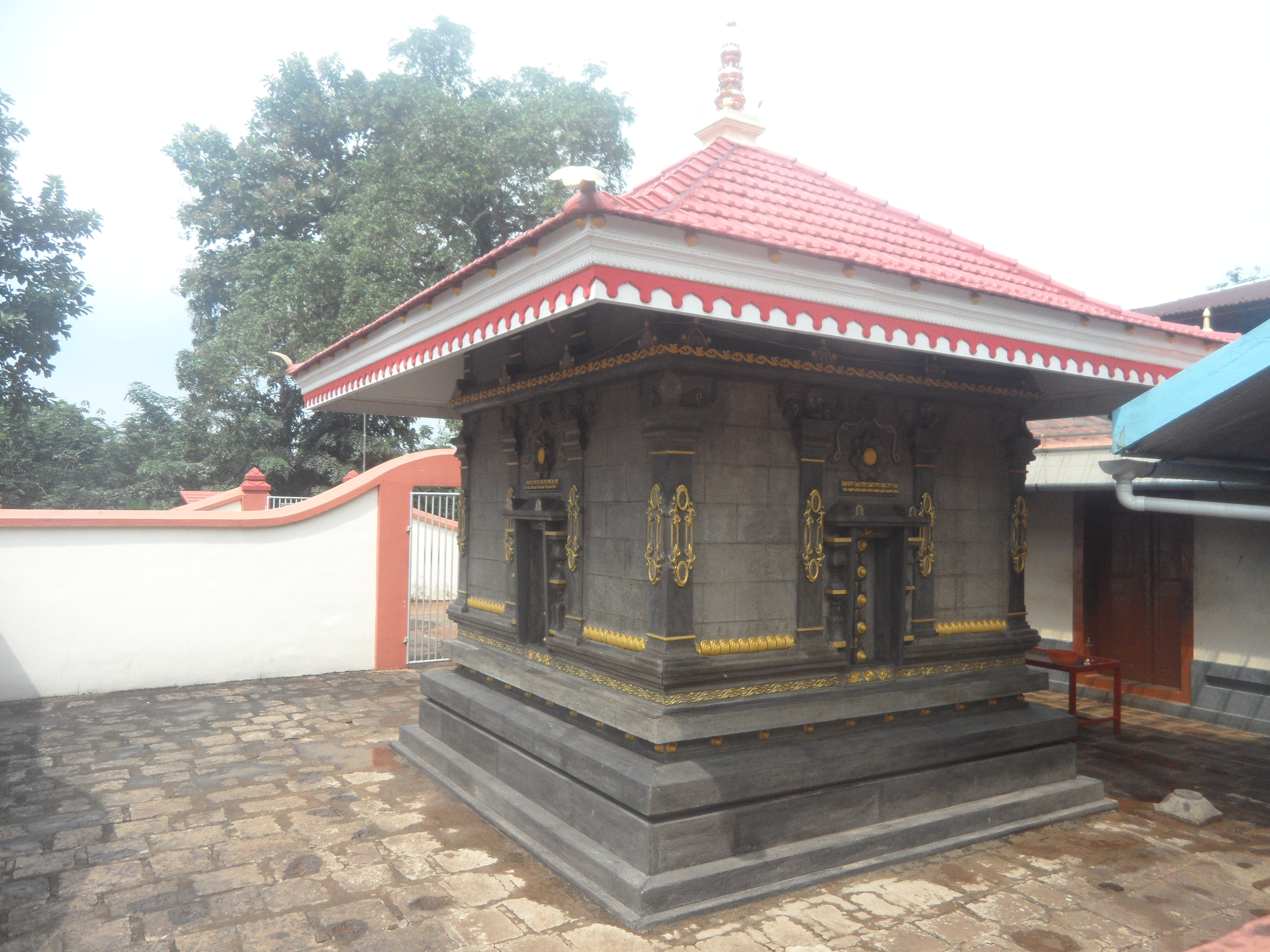
Pattupurackal bhagavathy temple- Sanctuary view 4

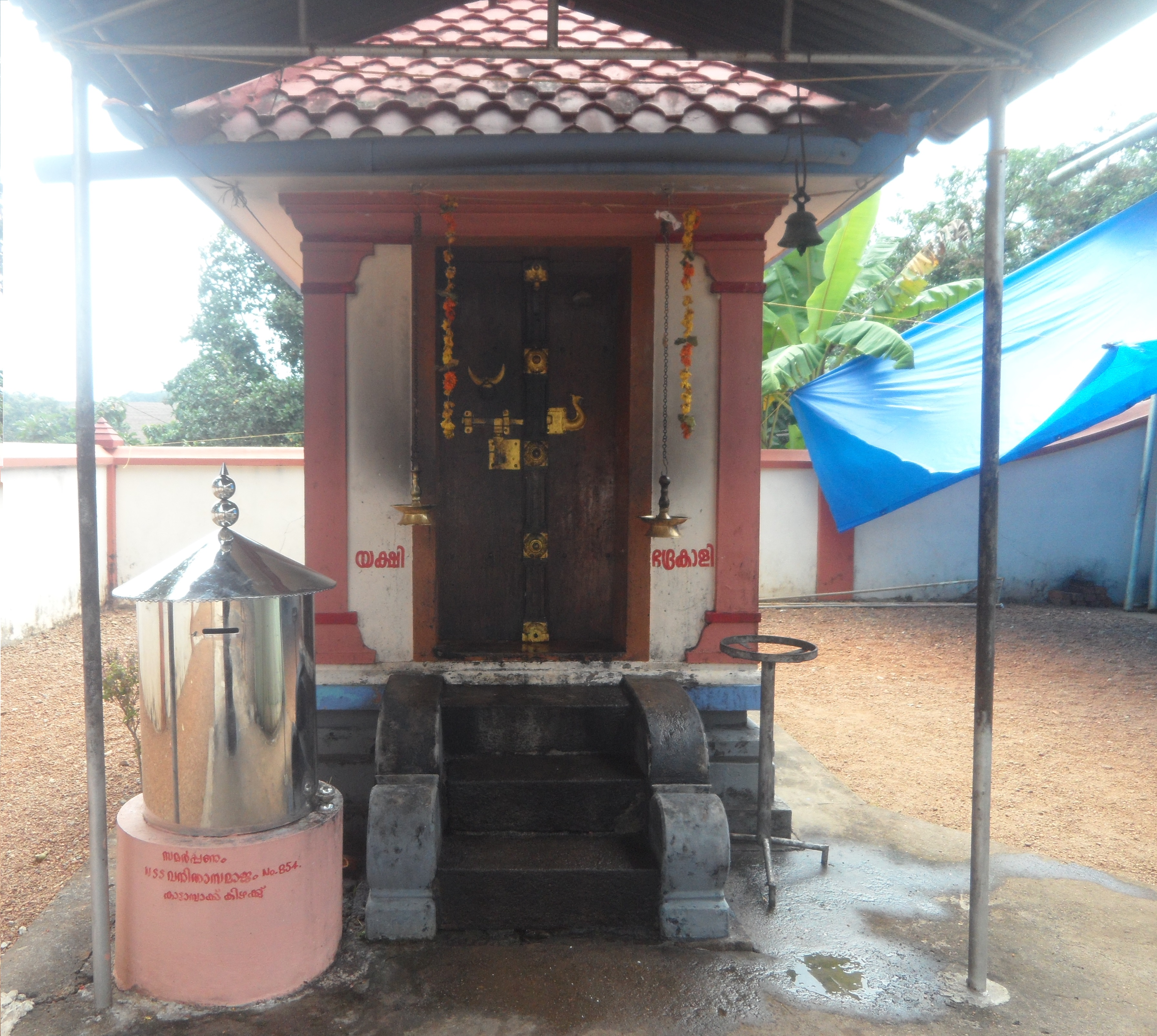
Pattupurackal bhagavathy temple- shrine of Subordinate Deities 1

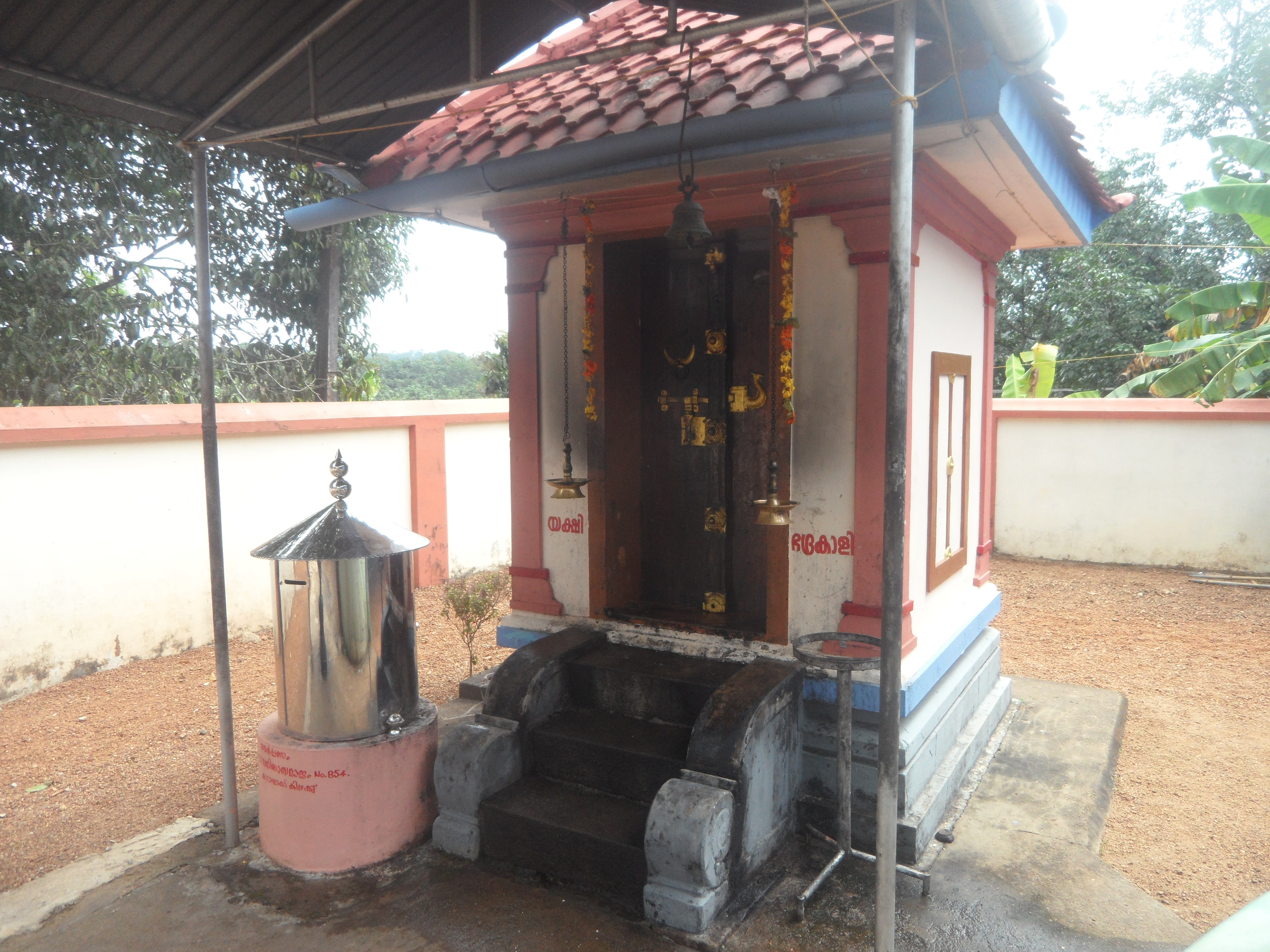
Pattupurackal bhagavathy temple- shrine of Subordinate Deities 2

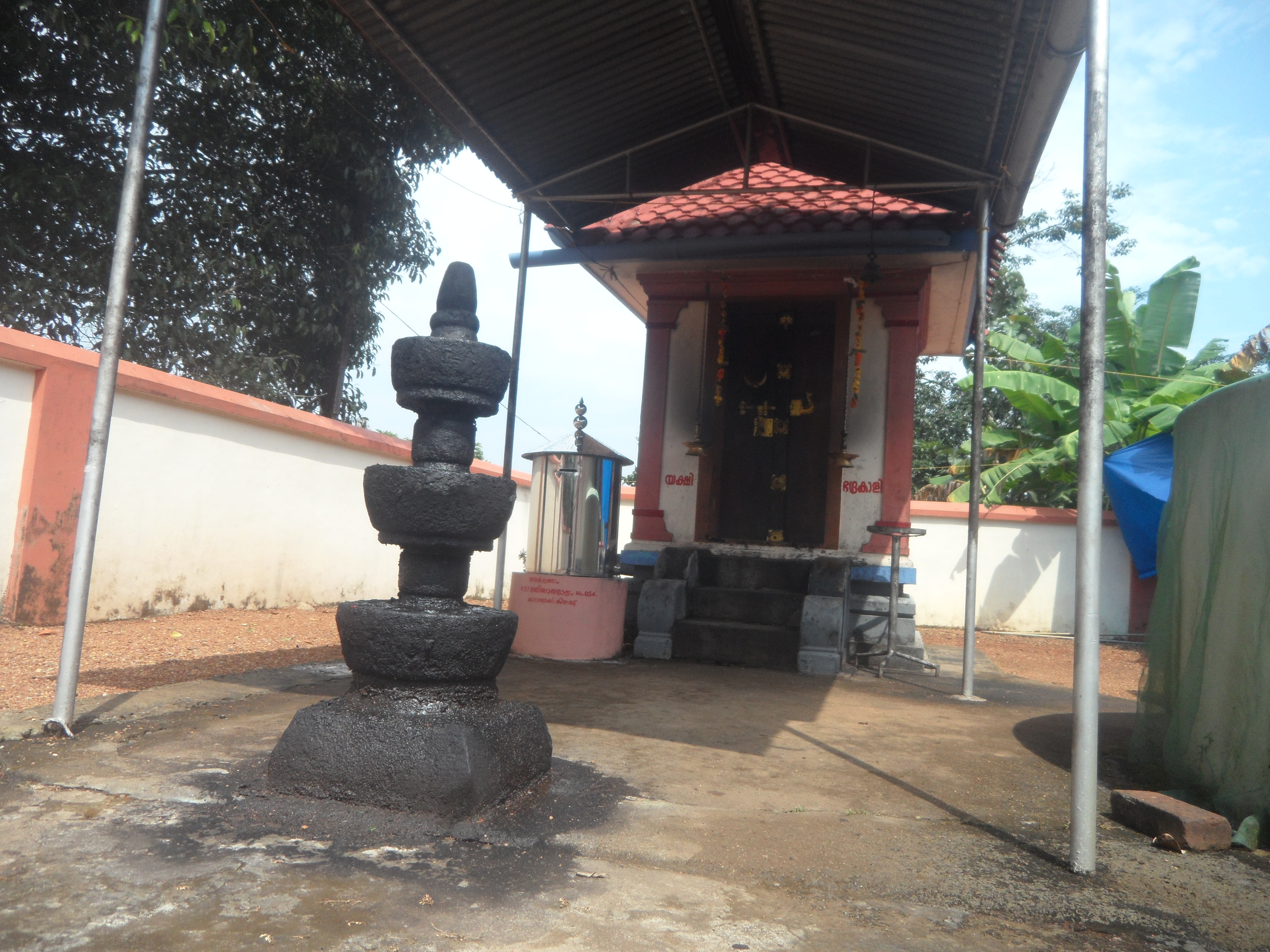
Pattupurackal bhagavathy temple- shrine of Subordinate Deities 3

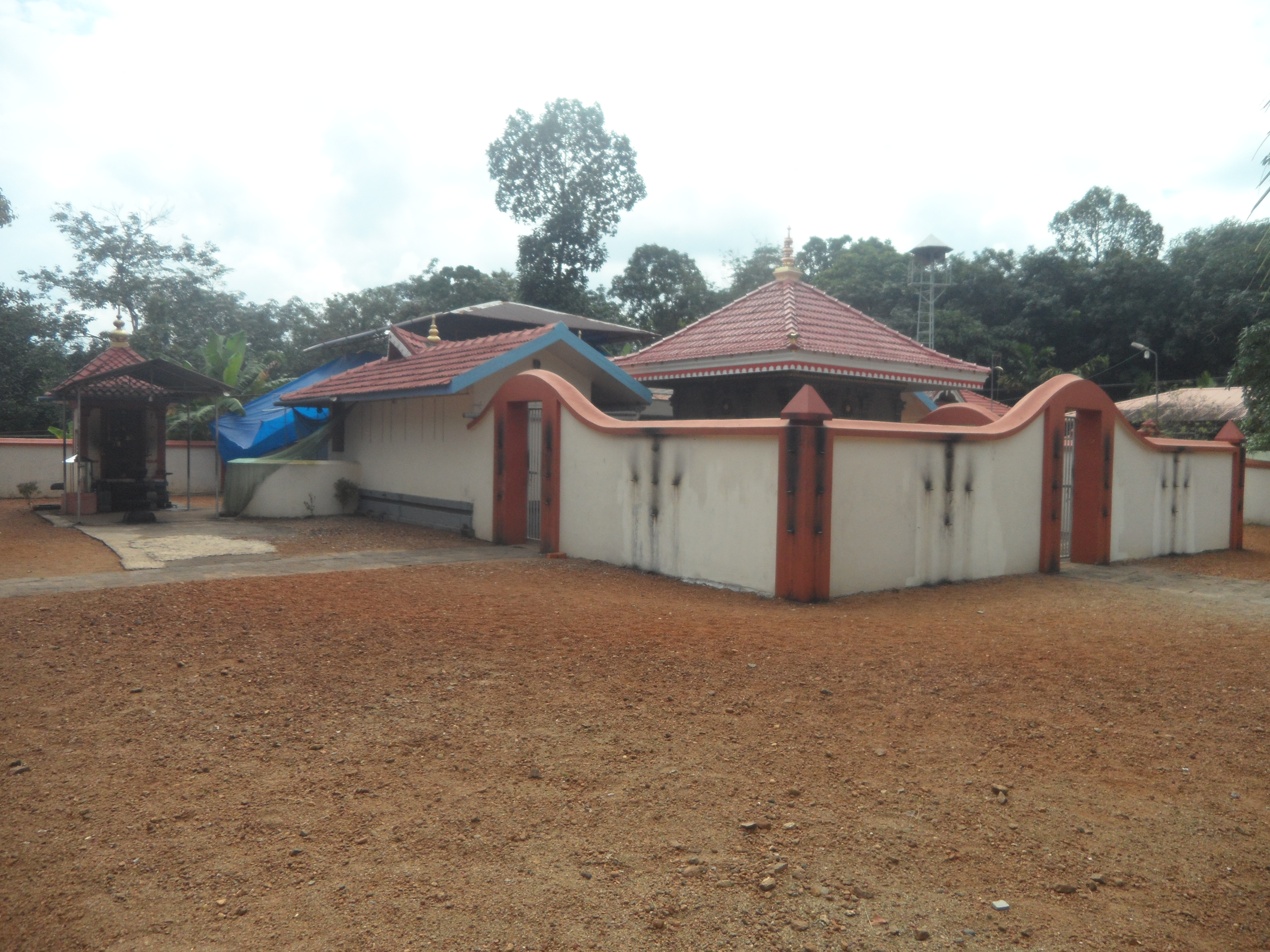
Pattupurackal bhagavathy temple 1

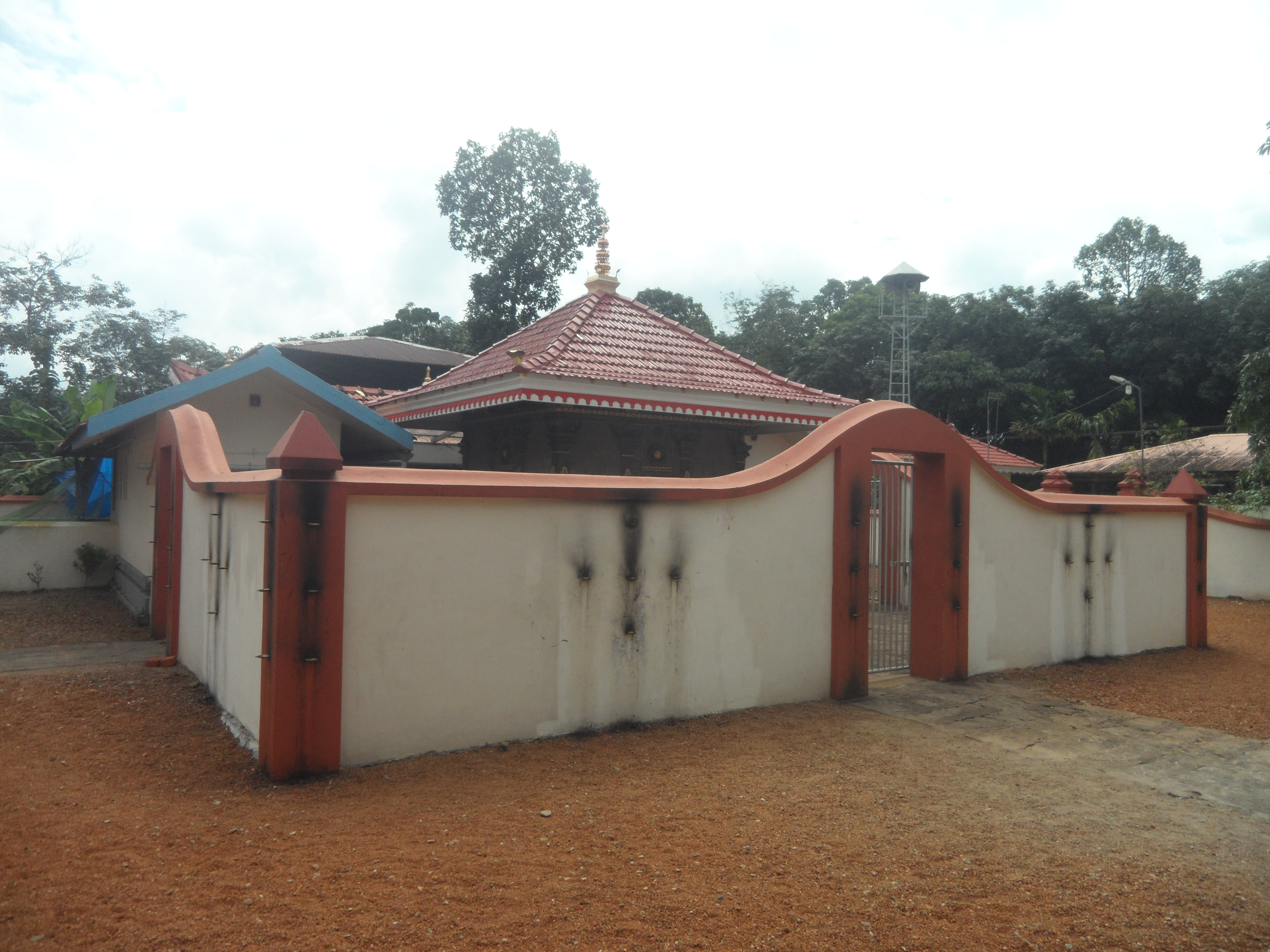
Pattupurackal bhagavathy temple 2

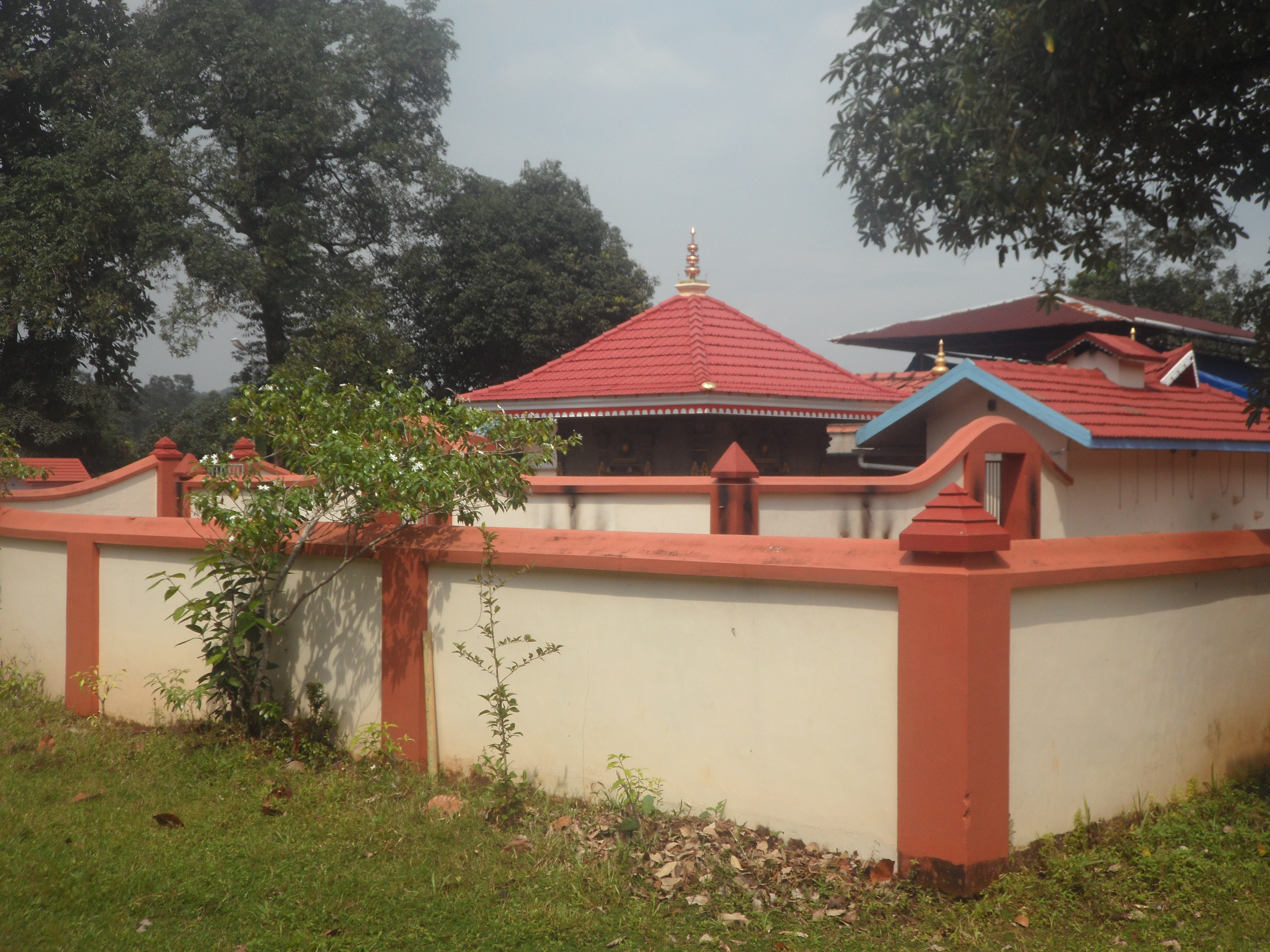
Pattupurackal bhagavathy temple kattampack 3

== See also ==
- Temples of Kerala
- Bhadrakali
- Njeezhoor
