= Njeezhoor =

Njeezhoor Neezhoor
- village
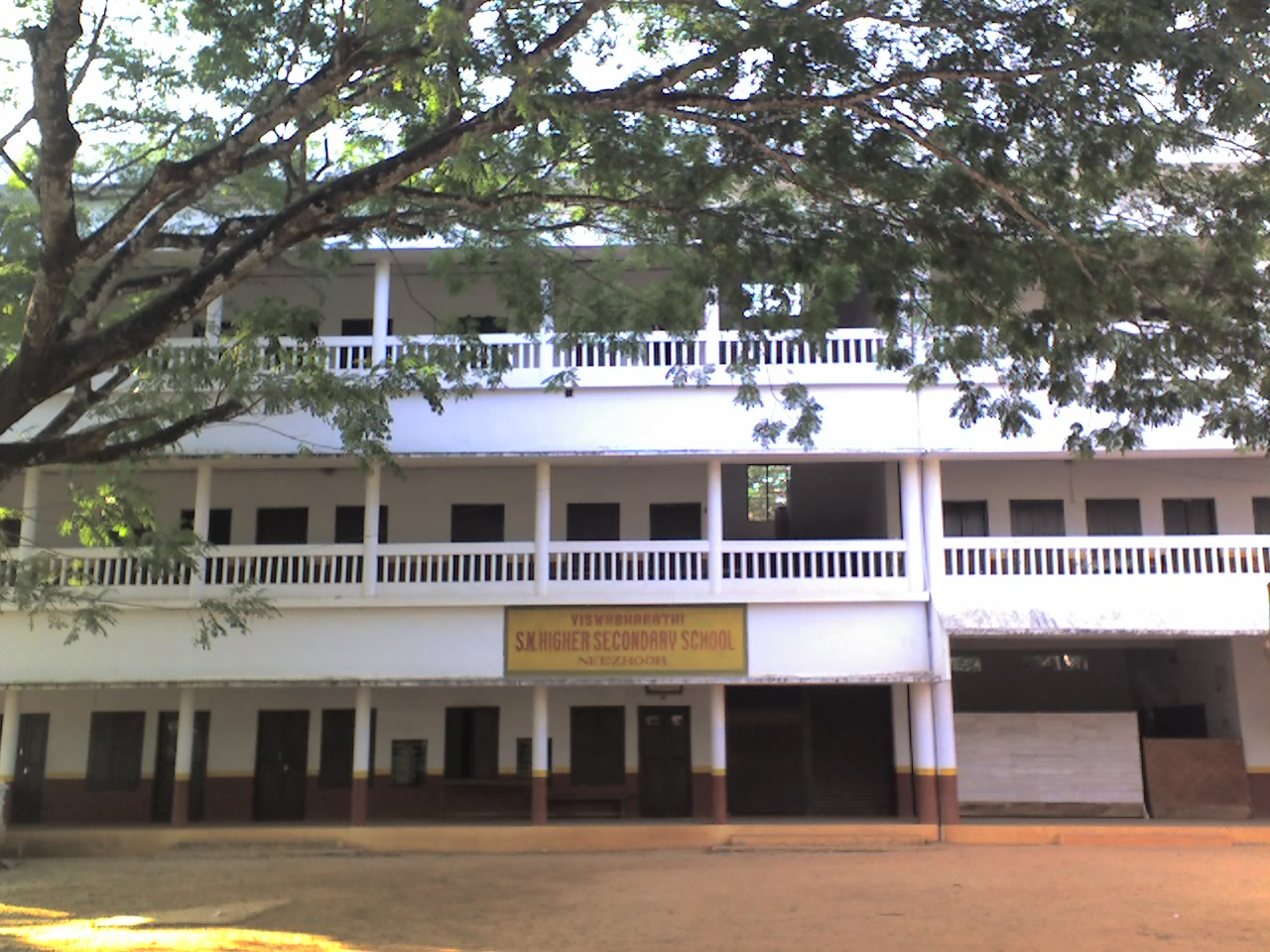
- VBSN Highschool
- Interactive map of Njeezhoor
- Coordinates: 9°47′30″N 76°31′35″E
- Country: India
- State: Kerala
- District: Kottayam

Languages
  - Official: Malayalam, English
- Time zone: UTC+5:30 (IST)
- PIN: 686612
- Telephone code: 91-4829-26XXXX
- Vehicle registration: KL-67
- Nearest city: Kottayam
- Literacy: 95%
- Climate: Tropical (Köppen)

Rubber Plantations

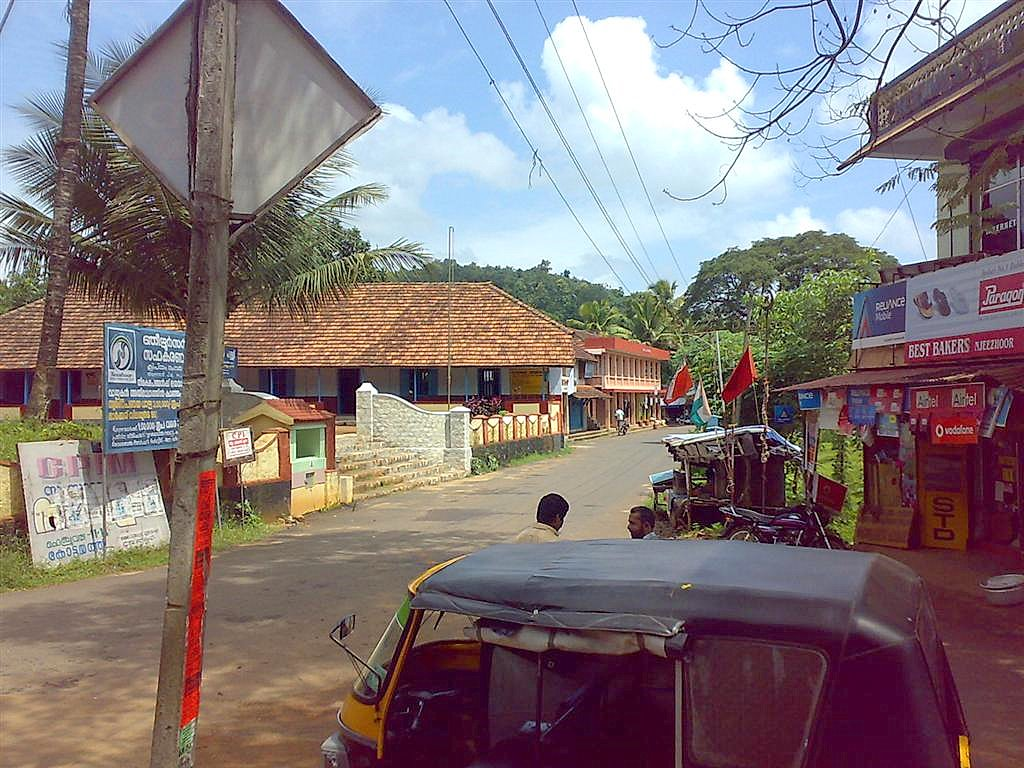
Neezhoor Town

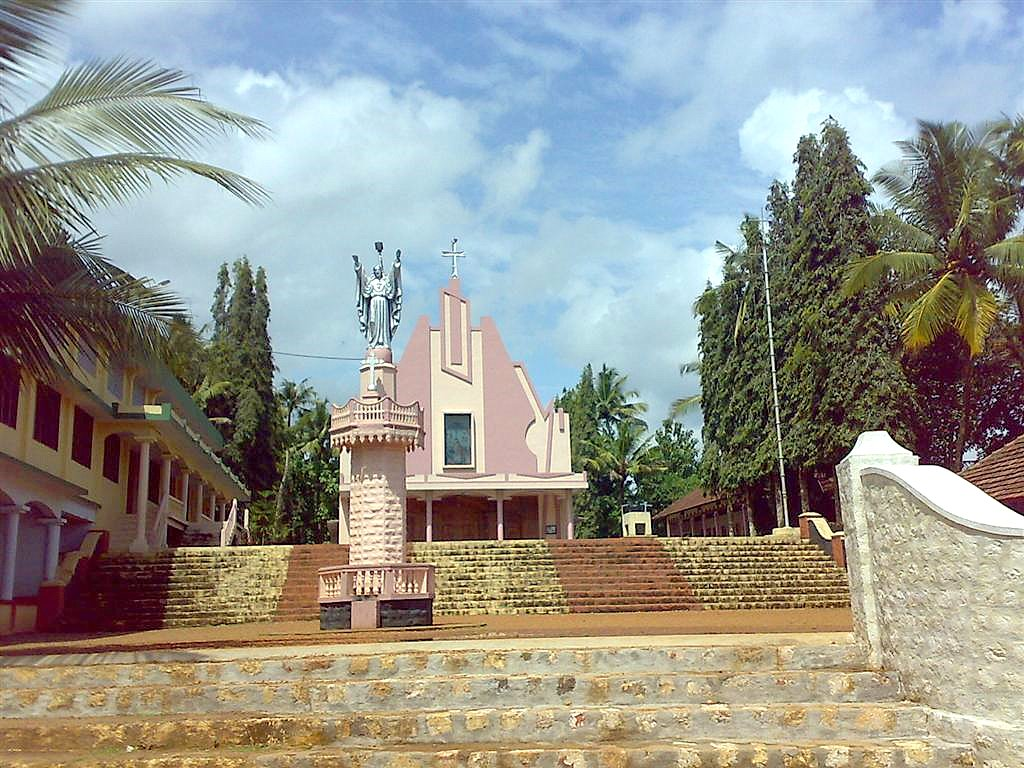
Infant Jesus Church

Njeezhoor is a village in Kottayam district in the state of Kerala, India. Njeezhoor is also spelled Neezhoor. Njeezhoor is situated at the northern end of Kottayam (30 km). Distance to Cochin is only 45 km. The nearest railhead is Piravom Road Railway Station (12 km). Even though it's a remote village in Kerala, it has 98% literacy rate, good educational institutions, cellular phone coverage, telephone exchanges, internet facilities, good transportation systems, irrigation systems, etc. Njeezhoor Grama Panchayat has been awarded "The Best Panchayat in Kottayam District" two times.

For history and more, refer this pdf

== Demographics ==
As of 2011 India census, Njeezhoor had a population of 17608 with 8777 males and 8831 females.

== Geography ==
Geographically, Kerala can be divided into three climatically distinct regions: the eastern highlands (rugged and cool mountainous terrain), the central midlands (rolling hills), and the western lowlands (coastal plains). Neezhoor comes under the central midlands. Some of the areas of neezhoor is included under Western Ghats.

== Climate ==
With 120–140 rainy days per year, Neezhoor has a wet and maritime tropical climate influenced by the seasonal heavy rains of the Southwest Summer Monsoon Neezhoor's rainfall averages 3,107 mm annually; Mean annual temperatures range from 18.0 to 35.0 °C. Throughout the year the climate is cool and pleasant.

== Agriculture ==
The main agriculture is rubber tree cultivation. Other than rubber, rice is cultivated. But most of the paddy fields are now transformed into lands for construction works. Tapioca, cloves, nutmeg, pepper, bitterguard, cucumber, and ginger are widely cultivated. Coconut trees are also widely grown.

== Education ==
Educational institutions-
1.IHRD Science College,
2.St.Kuriakose CBSE public school.
3.Viswabharathy Higher Secondary School,
4.Infant Jesus School,
5.Viswabharathy English medium School
6.NSS HS Kattamapack,
7. Govt. LPS Kattampack,
8. Govt. UPS Vadakkenirappu
9.CMS.LP Vilayamcode
10. GLPS marangoly etc.
After HSE, students move to other places in kerala or Metros in India or Abroad for higher education.

== Politics ==
Neezhoor panchyat hosts two major political alliances: the United Democratic Front (UDF—led by the Indian National Congress) and the Left Democratic Front (LDF—led by the CPI/CPI(M)). Last time it was the LDF that ruled the Panchayath. In the recent election, UDF became the ruling coalition.

== Temples ==
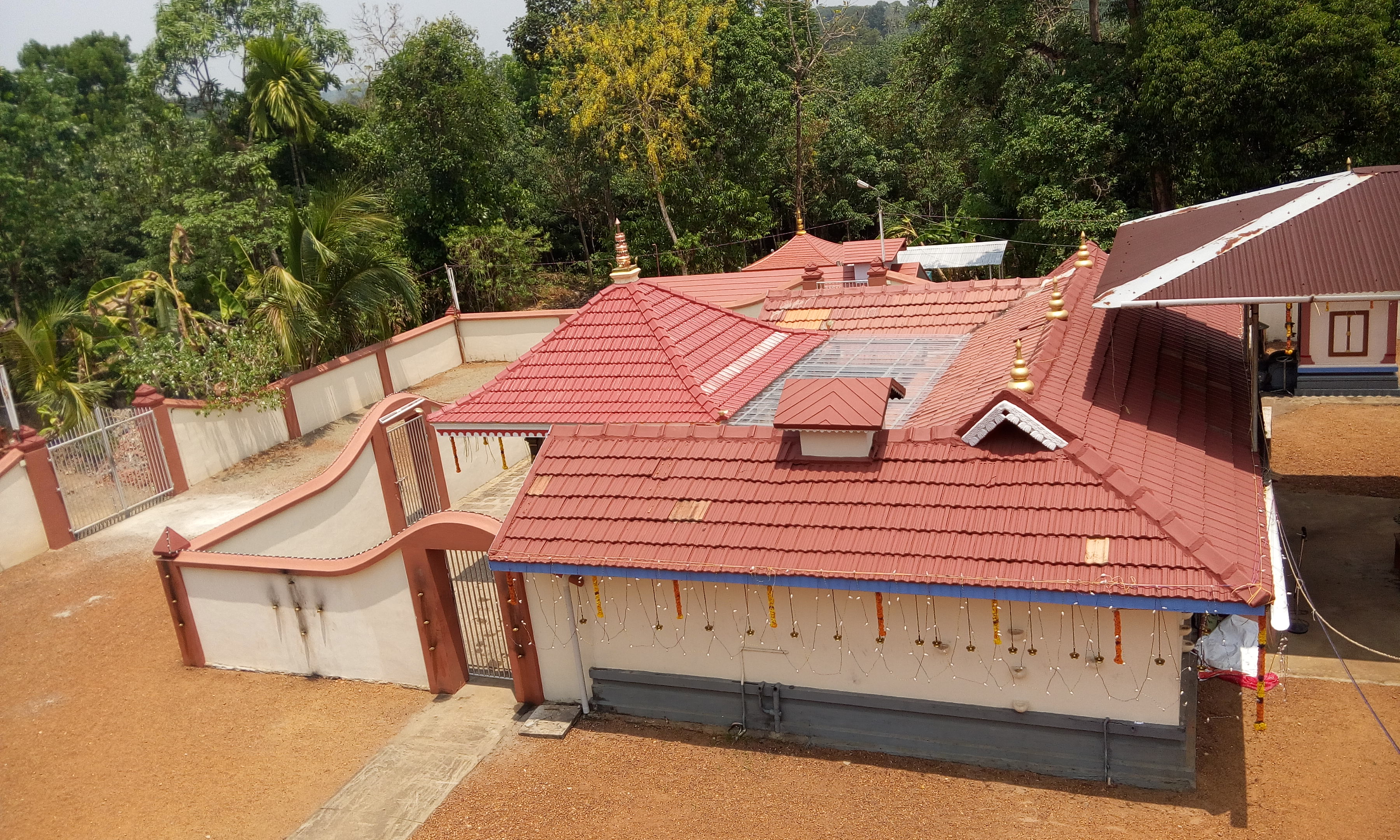
Pattupurackal Bhagavathy Temple Kattampack

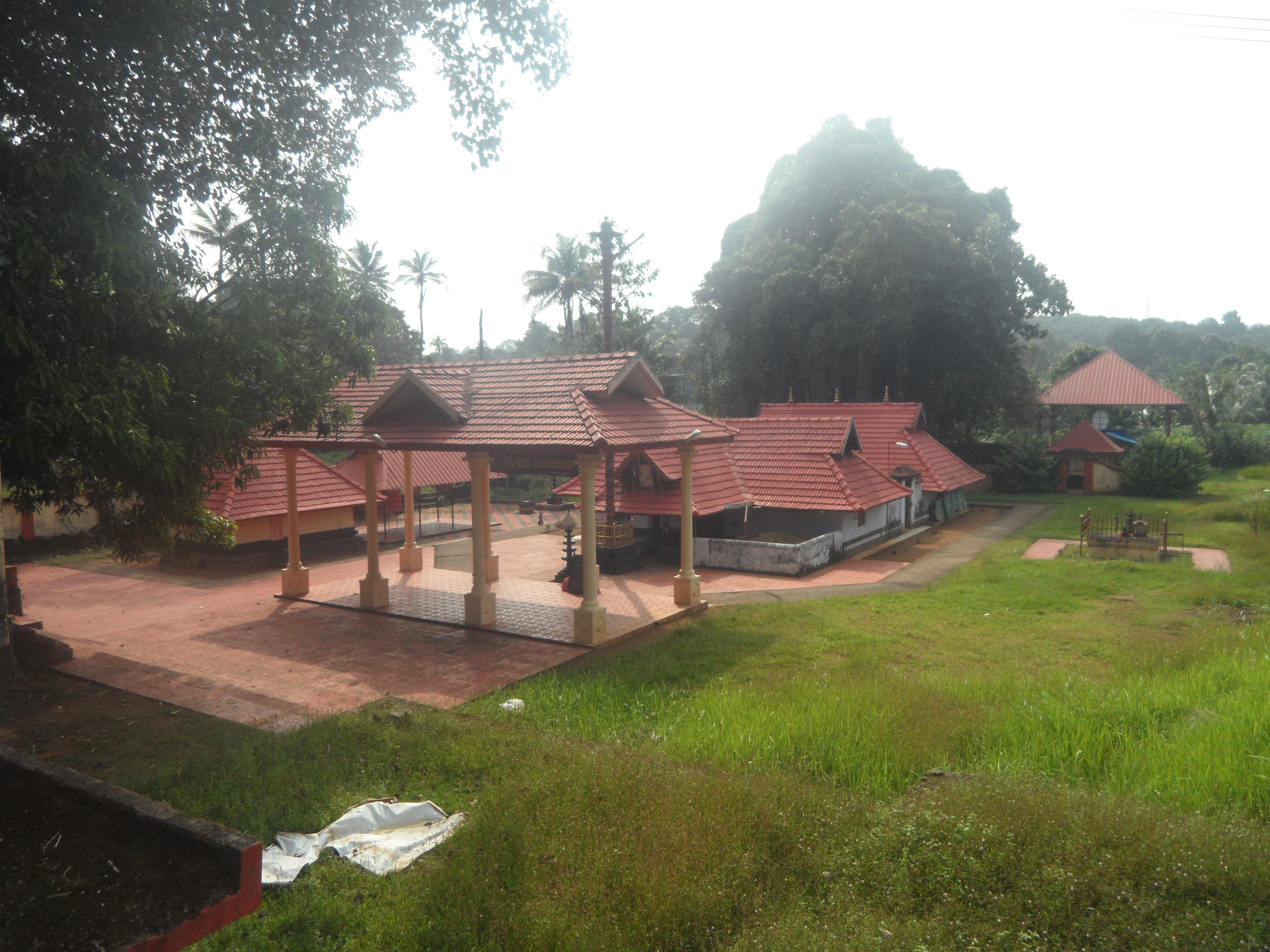
Sree Krishna Swami Temple Njeezhoor

Pattupurackal bhagavathy temple kattampack

Njeezhoor Sree Krishna Swamy Temple

== Demographics ==
98% of the people are educated. Only a few number of young people are diverted to agriculture. Most of the people are employed in Arab countries, United States, United Kingdom, Australia and Metros in India. Most of the people come under middle class. Majority of people are Hindu and Eastern Catholics. Social respect can be seen among the people.
