= Perakam Mahadeva Temple =

Hindu temple in Perakam, India

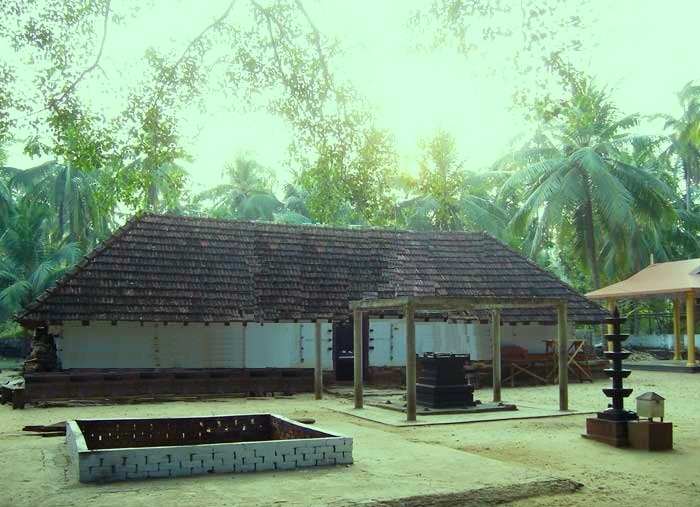
- Temple Nalambalam

Religion
- Affiliation: Hinduism
- District: Thrissur
- Deity: Shiva
- Festival: Maha Shivaratri

Location
- Location: Perakam
- State: Kerala
- Country: India
- Interactive map of Perakam Mahadeva Temple
- Coordinates: 10.6009266°N 76.023831°E

Architecture
- Type: Kerala style
- Completed: Not known
- Monument: 1

Perakam Mahadeva Temple (Malayalam: പേരകം മഹാദേവക്ഷേത്രം) is an ancient Hindu temple dedicated to Lord Shiva situated at Perakam village of Thrissur District in Kerala state in India. According to folklore, sage Parashurama has installed the idol of Lord Shiva in Perakam village. The temple is part of the 108 famous Shiva temples in Kerala and described in Shivalaya Sothram.

== Temple structure ==
It is one of the oldest temples in Thrissur District. It is believed that the present temple was constructed almost 200 years ago. Lord Shiva is also known as the patron of the name of the god of Perakam village. The temple consists of Nalambalam, Thidapalli, Vatta Sreekovil and Mandapam. The temple has been constructed to make it a part of the medieval temples. The Perakam Shiva Temple faces west. There are three daily poojas (prayer rituals): Usha Pooja, Ucha Pooja, and Night Pooja.

== Sub-deities ==
- Ayyappan
- Vettakoru makan
- Ganapathy
- Devi Parvathi
- Naga Goddess

== See also ==
- 108 Shiva Temples
- Temples of Kerala
- Hindu temples in Thrissur Rural
