= Perakam =

- Census town
- Location in Kerala, India
- Coordinates: 10.6037400°N 76.007440°E
- Country: India
- State: Kerala
- District: Thrissur

Population (2001)
  - Total: 10,356

Languages
  - Official: Malayalam, English
- Time zone: UTC+5:30 (IST)

Perakam is a census town in Thrissur district in the Indian state of Kerala.

== Demographics ==
As of 2001 India census, Perakam had a population of 10,356. Males constitute 47% of the population and females 53%. Perakam has an average literacy rate of 84%, higher than the national average of 59.5%: male literacy is 85%, and female literacy is 84%. In Perakam, 11% of the population is under 6 years of age.
