= Kainoor Shiva Temple =

Hindu temple in Thrissur district, Kerala, India

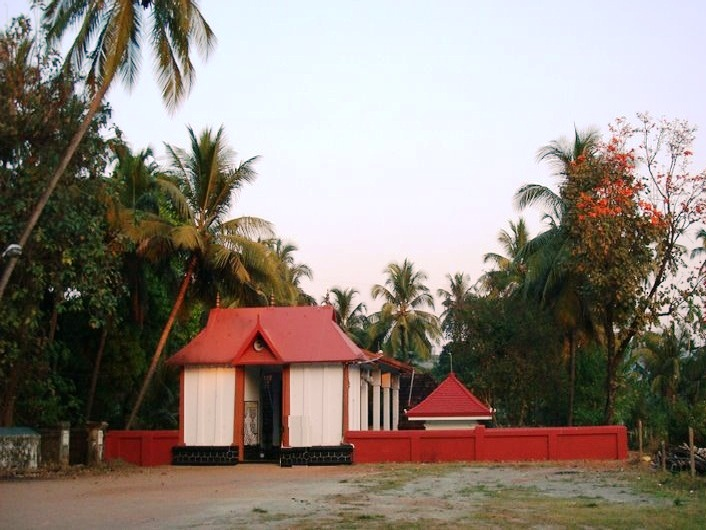
- East Tower

- Shiva Temple, Kainoor, Thrissur, Kerala

Religion
- Affiliation: Hinduism
- District: Thrissur
- Deity: Shiva
- Festivals: Maha Shivaratri, Murajapam

Location
- Location: Kainoor
- State: Kerala
- Country: India
- Interactive map of Kainoor Shiva Temple
- Coordinates: 10.500259°N 76.278215°E

Architecture
- Type: Kerala style
- Completed: Not known

Specifications
- Temple: One
- Monument: 1
- Elevation: 37.75 m (124 ft)

Kainoor Shiva Temple is located at Kainoor village in Thrissur district. The temple preceding deity is Shiva in the sanctum sanctorum facing east. It is believed that this temple is one of the 108 Shiva temples of Kerala and is installed by sage Parasurama dedicated to Shiva. Maha Shivarathri festival of the temple celebrates in the Malayalam month of Kumbha (February - March). In ancient days Murajapam was conducting daily in Kainoor Shiva Temple. On the east, there is an imposing gopuram (tower) and it's recently built. The temple is located in center of Kainoor grama (village), on the Thrissur - Manamangalam - Puthur route, on the bank of Manali river, a tributary of Karuvannur puzha.

== See also ==
- 108 Shiva Temples
- Temples of Kerala
