= Nambinar Keduvathillai =

1986 film by K. Shankar

- Theatrical release poster
- Directed by: K. Shankar
- Screenplay by: K. Shankar
- Story by: Ramanujam
- Produced by: Kamakshi Shankar
- Starring: Vijayakanth; Prabhu; Jayashree; Sudha Chandran; Jayamala
- Cinematography: M. C. Sekar
- Edited by: K. Shankar; V. Devan
- Music by: M. S. Viswanathan
- Production company: Siva Shankar
- Release date: 23 May 1986
- Running time: 136 minutes
- Country: India
- Language: Tamil

Nambinar Keduvathillai (transl. Those who believe will not get spoiled) is a 1986 Indian Tamil language devotional film, directed by K. Shankar. The film stars Vijayakanth, Prabhu, Jayashree and Sudha Chandran. It was released on 23 May 1986.

== Cast ==
- Vijayakanth as Murali
- Prabhu as Vinoth
- Jayashree
- Sudha Chandran
- Jayamala
- M. N. Nambiar
- Master Sridhar
- Senthil
- Jai Ganesh
- Sirkazhi Govindarajan
- LIC Narasimhan
- V. Gopalakrishnan
- Vadivukkarasi
- V. K. Ramasamy
- Manorama
- C. K. Saraswathi
- Oru Viral Krishna Rao
- Suryakanth
- Rajeev

== Production ==
The song "Nambinar" was reportedly shot at the 18 steps of the Sabarimala Temple from 8 to 13 March 1986. Later, the crew was sued by an Ayyappa devotee for seemigly allowing actress Sudha Chandran to enter Sabarimala, at a time when women were not allowed into the temple and argued that her presence diluted the purity of the temple. Director Shankar was let off, but Sudha was fined. Later it was reported that the song was actually shot in Madras on a set constructed to resemble the Sabarimala Temple.

== Soundtrack ==
The soundtrack was composed by M. S. Viswanathan.

Track listing
No.	Title	Singer(s)	Length
1.	"Nambinar"	K. J. Yesudas, Vani Jairam
2.	"Gokula Kanna"	K. S. Chithra
3.	"Jyothisa Roobane"	K. S. Chithra
4.	"Aethriya Deepathai"	Vani Jairam
5.	"Swamiye Saranam"	Sirkazhi Govindarajan
6.	"Pathinettam Padikale"	M. S. Viswanathan

== Critical reception ==
Anna praised the acting, humour, music, cinematography and direction.
