= Pathinettampadi =

Eighteen holy steps at Sabarimala, Kerala, India

Pathinettampadi (Malayalam: പതിനെട്ടാംപടി) are the 18 divine steps to the 'Thirumuttam' of famed Sabarimala temple in Kerala state of India. These steps have a length of 5 feet, width of 9 inches and height of 9 inches. Earlier, these steps were made out of granite and later in 1985, it was covered by 'Panchaloha', a composition of five metals such as gold, silver, copper, iron and tin. One who undertakes Sabarimala pilgrimage must mark his feet over these steps by carrying an 'irumudikettu' and undergoing a vratam (penance) of 41 days. The pilgrims who climbed the Pathinettampadi for 18 times needs to plant a young coconut tree at Sannidhanam and thereby becomes a 'Guruswami'. In the past, devotees used to break coconuts on these steps which was later restricted and replaced.

== Symbolism of eighteen steps ==
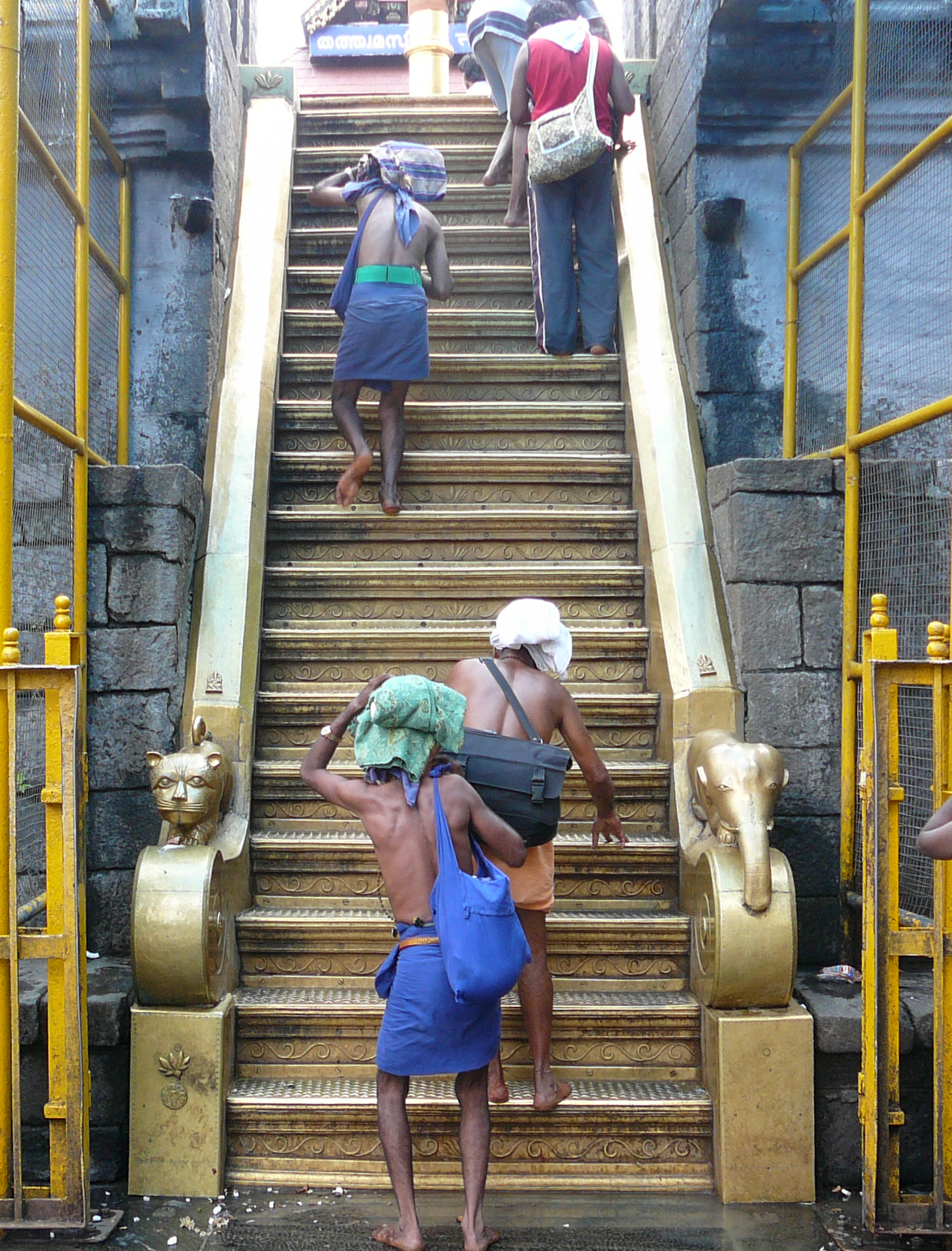
Pilgrims climbing the eighteen sacred steps at Sannidhanam

The first five steps represents 'Panchendriyas', which are the five human senses such as eye, ear, nose, skin and mouth. The next eight steps represents "Ashtaragas' which includes Kama (desire), Krodha (anger), Lobha (inordinate desire), Moha (attachment), Madha (pride), Matsarya (unhealthy competition), Asuya (jealousy) and Dhumb (braggy). The next three steps represents 'Thrigunas' or the three qualities of Sathva, Rajas and Thamas. The final two steps indicates Vidya (knowledge) and Avidya (ignorance of knowledge). These steps also symbolizes the eighteen hills that surrounds the Sabarimala temple which are Ponnambalamedu, Gaudanmala, Nagamala, Sundaramala, Karimala, Mathangamala, Mayiladummala, Sreepadamala, Thevarmala, Nilakkalmala, Thalapparamala, Chittambalamala, Ghalkimala, Puthusserymala, Kalakettymala, Inchipparamala, Sabarimala and Neelimala. One who cross all these steps become purified and attains eligibility to get the darshan of lord Ayyappa.

== Significance of eighteen in Sabarimala ==
The number 18 has a unique position and significance within Hinduism. Some of them are the following;

- The puranas and upa-puranas wrote by Veda Vyasa are eighteen in number.
- The historic Kurukshethra war in Mahabharata lasted for eighteen days and it had eighteen Akshauhini armies.
- There are 18 Shakti Peethams (holy temples of Goddess Shakti).
- Mahabharatha has eighteen chapterss.
- The Bhagavad Gita and Vedas have eighteen chapters.
- Sabarimala temple is surrounded by eighteen hills and it has eighteen steps.

== Padi pooja ==
The padi pooja is a ritualistic pooja performed by the thantri accompanied by the Melshanthi (chief priest) to the eighteen hill deities who guards Ayyappa. The steps are decorated with beautiful flowers and each of them will have lamps. The rituals are concluded by the Aarathi by tantri. In fact, it is the most expensive vazhipadu or offering at Sannidhanam.

== Gallery ==
The closed Pathinettampadi	Devotees climbing Pathinettampadi	Pilgrims at Pathinettampadi

== See also ==
- Maalikapurathamma
- Pettathullal
- Makaravilakku
