= Maalikapurathamma =

Family deity of Pandalam dynasty and Lord Ayyappa

Maalikapurathamma is a Hindu goddess enshrined in a small temple at Sabarimala Ayyappan temple. The Maalikapurathamma temple is located within the Sabarimala temple complex and is visited after visiting the main shrine.

== Legend ==
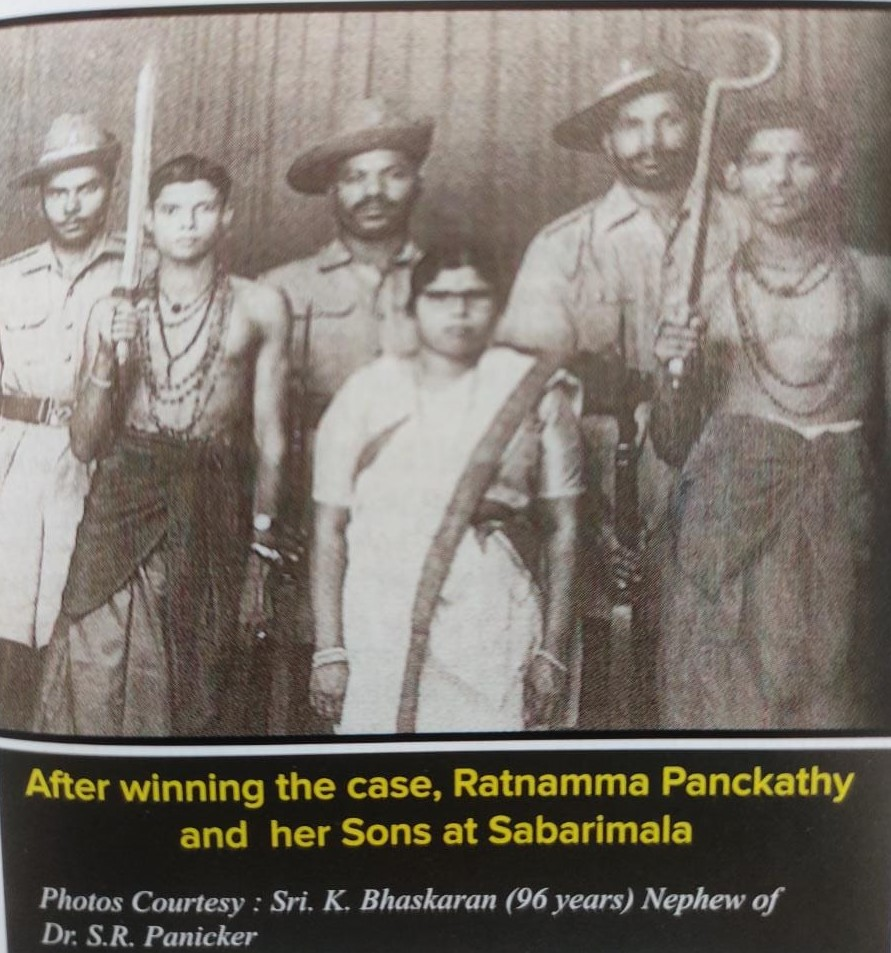
After winning the case and gaining hereditary rights to conduct fireworks at Sabarimala, Ratnamma Panickathy from Cheerappanchira and her sons at Sabarimala.

Cheerappanchira is an ancient noble Ezhava family from Muhamma in Alappuzha District. According to mythology, Maalikapurathamma is the divine daughter of Cheerappanchira Panicker. Ayyappan was sent by the Pandalam king to Muhamma to learn Kalaripayattu. Malikkapurathamma, also known as Subhadra, taught kalari to Ayyappan in the absence of her father. During this time, she fell in love with Ayyappan, but Ayyappan remained celibate. The Cheerappanchira family holds the rights to conduct fireworks, to light Nilavilak and ceremonial lamps at the Malikapurathamma temple, and collect half of the coconuts donated by the devotees at the Malikapurathamma temple. Some story recounts her name as Poonkodi or Leela or Lalitha.

In another story the demoness Mahishi, became free from sin after the slaying of the demoness Mahishi. Mahishi requested Lord Ayyappa to marry her, which he declined on the grounds of his vow of eternal celibacy. According to the tradition, when she insisted, Ayyappa stipulated that the marriage could occur only if no celibate male devotees (Kanni Ayyappans) arrived at Sabarimala. She later came to be worshipped as Malikapurathamma. Every year during the Makaravilakku festival, Malikappurathamma ezhunnallathu, a ritual procession associated with the Malikappurathama will be conducted. The procession proceeds from the Malikappuram temple towards the Pathinettampadi of the Sabarimala hill, and on the concluding day reaches a place known as Saramkuthi, where Kanni Ayyappans would have stick an arrow showing their entry into the Sabarimala. After seeing the arrows, Malikapurathamma returns to her shrine.

== Offerings ==
Thenga Urutt (rolling of coconut) is an important ritual performed in the temple. Coconuts are offered to the goddess after rolling them on the ground. Other offerings to the goddess include betel leaves, kumkum, turmeric, banana, jaggery, red colored-silk, and honey.

== See also ==
- Cheerappanchira
- Sabarimala Trek
- Makara Jyothi
- Pettathullal
- Sabarimala
