= Sabarimala Temple =

Hindu temple in Kerala, India

Sabarimala Sree Dharma Sastha Temple
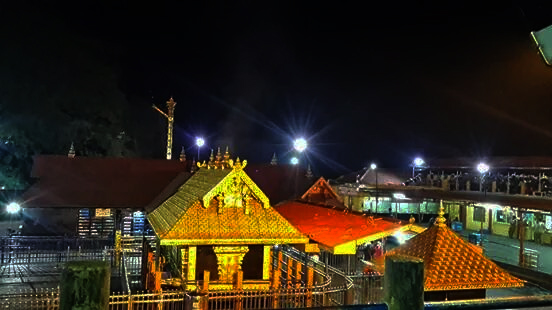
- Sabarimala Main Shrine Complex

- Sabarimala Temple (Kerala) Sabarimala Temple (India)

Religion
- Affiliation: Hinduism
- District: Pathanamthitta
- Deity: Dharmasastha in his avatar as Ayyappan is an eternal celibate yogi
- Festivals: Makaravilakku, Makara Sankranti (14 January)
- Governing body: Travancore Devaswom Board
- Status: Active (Regulated Pilgrimage Schedule)

Location
- Location: Sabarimala
- State: Keralam
- Country: India
- Coordinates: 9°26′04.6″N 77°04′53.0″E

Architecture
- Type: Kerala Architecture (Traditional Kerala Vastu Shastra)
- Creator: As per tradition Aryan Kerala Varman (Ayyappan), Pandalam King
- Completed: 11th Century (Site of greater antiquity)
- Elevation: 1,260 m (4,134 ft)

Website
- sabarimala.kerala.gov.in

The Sabarimala Sree Dharma Sastha Temple (Malayalam: ശബരിമല ശ്രീ ധർമ്മ ശാസ്താ ക്ഷേത്രം) (Malayalam pronunciation: [ʃabəɾimala]) is a Hindu temple dedicated to Lord Sree Dharma Sastha where the deity is worshipped as Lord Ayyappan, an eternal brahmachari, the son of the deities Shiva and Mohini (female avatar of the god Vishnu), and is situated atop the Sabarimala hill in Pathanamthitta district of Kerala, India. The temple is surrounded by 18 hills in the Periyar Tiger Reserve. It is one of the largest annual pilgrimage sites in the world, with an estimate of over 10 to 15 million devotees visiting every year.

The temple is open for worship only during the days of Mandala Pooja (approximately 15 November to 26 December), Makaravilakku or Makara Sankranti (14 January), Maha Thirumal Sankranti (14 April), and the first five days of each Malayalam month. The Sabarimala Temple serves as a prime example of the amalgamation of several religious traditions within the Indian context.

== Origins and legends ==
=== Legend of Manikandan ===
Sage Suta told his followers the story of how Ayyappa was born, according to Bhutnathopakhyanam, a text for Ayyappan followers. After Goddess Durga killed the demon Mahishasura, his sister Mahishi arrived to take revenge on the devas (gods). After Mahishi performed a severe tapasya, Brahma was pleased with her and gave Mahishi a boon that made her invincible, with the condition that only a human born of Vishnu and Shiva could kill her. Knowing that Vishnu and Shiva would never bring forth a child, Mahishi became arrogant and seized the earth and heavens, brutally killing all who worshipped a god. The gods were afraid and helpless, so they sought assistance from Vishnu. The union of Shiva and Vishnu, who took the avatar of Mohini, produced a son named Manikandan (the one who has a bell tied to his neck).

Manikandan was abandoned on the banks of the Pampa River in southern India. The emperor Rajashekhara of the Panthalam dynasty, who was childless, found this child. In the meantime, the queen delivered a baby. The prime minister disliked Manikandan and devised a scheme to eliminate him. He asked the queen to lie about her sickness, claiming that she could only be treated by consuming tiger's milk. Twelve-year-old Manikandan ventured into the wilderness in search of tiger's milk for his adoptive mother. On his journey through the forest, he killed Mahishi. The gods were pleased at Mahishi's death. Indra, Agni, Varuna, Vayu and Kubera appeared before Ayyappan and told him that they would help him. The gods transformed into tigers, which Manikandan used to return to the kingdom. As soon as Rajashekhara saw Manikandan accompanied by tigers, Rajashekhara found out the truth behind the prime minister and proceeded to punish him, but Manikandan stopped him from doing so, stating that he had hastened the divine mission of killing Mahishi. Rajashekhara then bowed before Manikandan, who said that he needed a temple to live in. Manikandan asked his father and the citizens to accompany him. Manikandan shot an arrow into the sky. The arrow eventually landed at the summit of the Sabarimala hill, and Manikandan asked the king to build only 18 steps from the ground to the summit and then ascended to heaven.

Rajashekhara thought that 18 steps from the ground to a tall hill was impossible. Parashurama appeared before him and told the king he would help him build the temple. The temple was eventually built, and Parashurama installed a holy stone idol of Manikandan. The idol depicts Manikandan as Ayyappan, seated in a yogic posture, symbolizing the purity of the vow of Brahmacharya, with his right hand displaying the abhaya mudra (chinmudra), his left hand resting on his left thigh, his legs bound by a cloth and seated on a pedestal.

=== Legends related to other deities ===
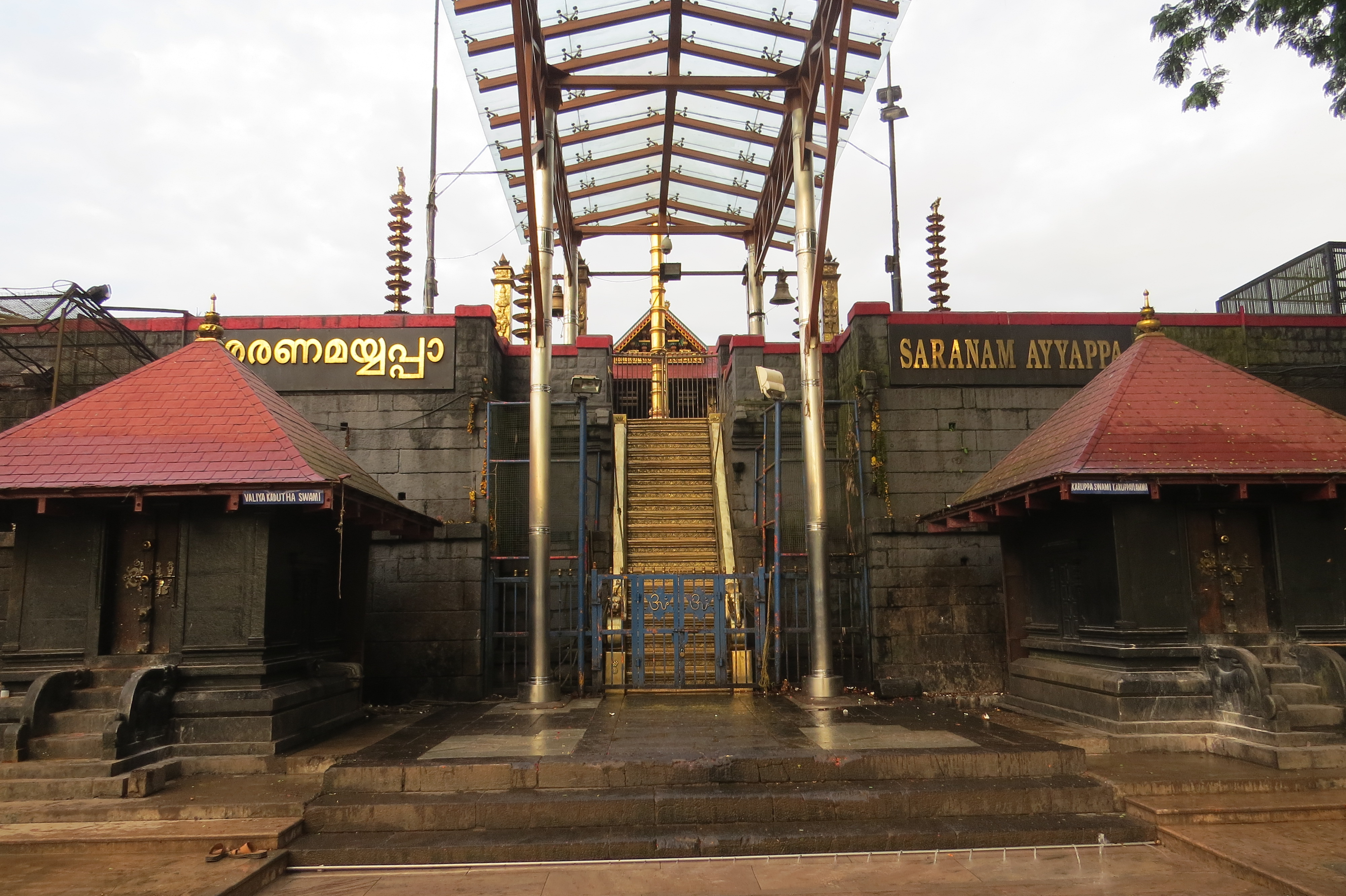
Temple dedicated to Valiyakadutta Swami on the left of the Pathinettampadi and the Karuppu Swami & Karuppai Amma on the right

Valiyakadutta Swami (elder Kadutha Swami) and Kochukadutta Swami (younger Kadutha Swami), both legendary generals in Lord Ayyappa's army. Valiyakaduttar led the Pandalam kingdom's army, while Kochukaduttar, a skilled warrior from Injiparai Kalari, became his aide. Together, they fought bravely, destroying Udaya's Injiparai fort in the Karimala battle. In the battle, Kochukadutta fought the war despite losing both legs. When Ayyappa returned to his Samadhi at Sabarimala, Kochukadutta chose to stay and serve there. His shrine is located near the Malikapurathamma shrine. The Valiyakadutta shrine is located to the left of the Pathinettaampadi (Holy steps).

Karuppu Swami & Karuppai Amma were forest-dwellers who assisted Lord Ayyappa in defeating Udayan and are revered for their own supernatural powers. A shrine dedicated to them is located on the right side of the Pathinettaampadi.

=== Connection with Rama ===
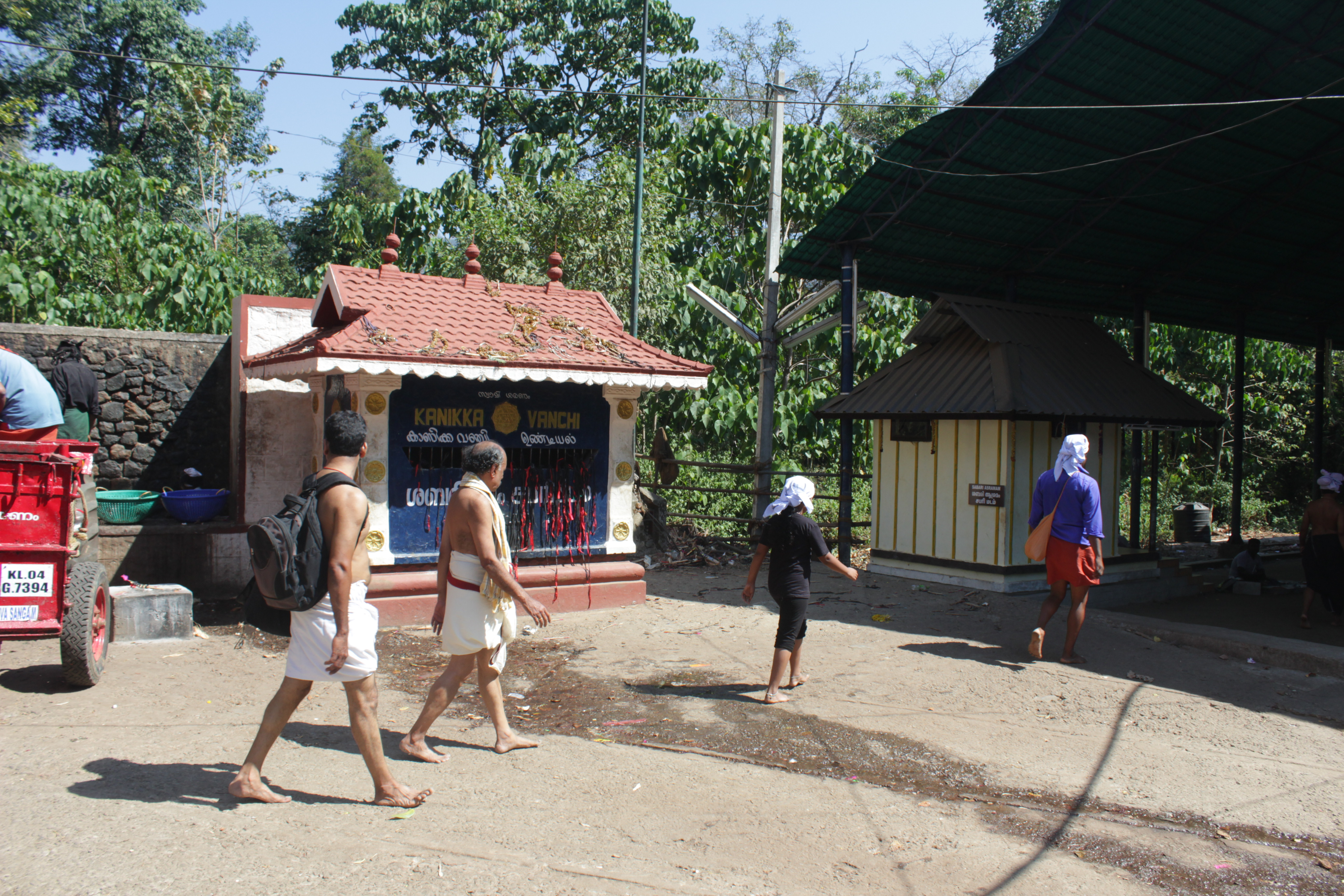
Sabaripeedam, place where Shabari got salvation from Lord Rama

Shabari was a tribal devotee of Rama who is mentioned in the Ramayana. Sabarimala literally translates to "the hill of Sabari."

As per legend, Shabari met Sage Matanga near the foot of Mount Rishyamukha. He became her guru, and she devotedly served him for years. When Matanga was on his deathbed, he foretold that Rama would come to grant her darshan. He told her to wait for the arrival of Rama. Since that time, Sabari would leave her ashram each day only to gather berries for Rama. She would pick one, taste it, and place it in her basket if it was sweet, discarding the bitter berries because she wanted Rama to have only the sweet berries. While searching for Sita, Rama visits Sabari at her ashram. Sabari fed Rama with the berries that she had collected. The place in Sabarimala where its believed that Rama gave moksha to Sabari is called Sabari Peedam.

Rama saw a divine person doing penance and asked Shabari to tell him who it was. Shabari said it was Shastha (Ayyappan). Shastha also met and greeted Rama.

== The temple ==
Sabarimala Picture gallery

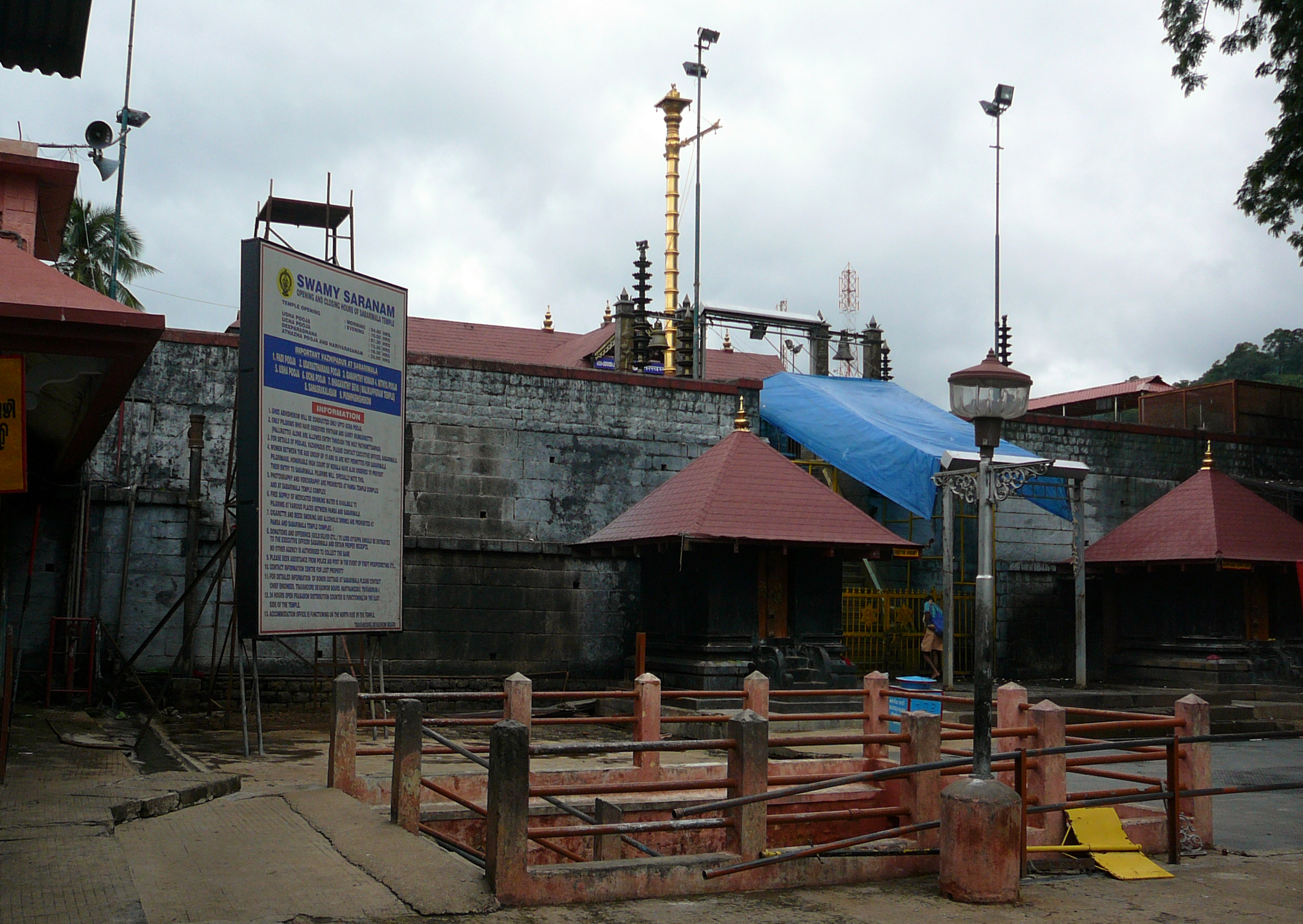
The main temple

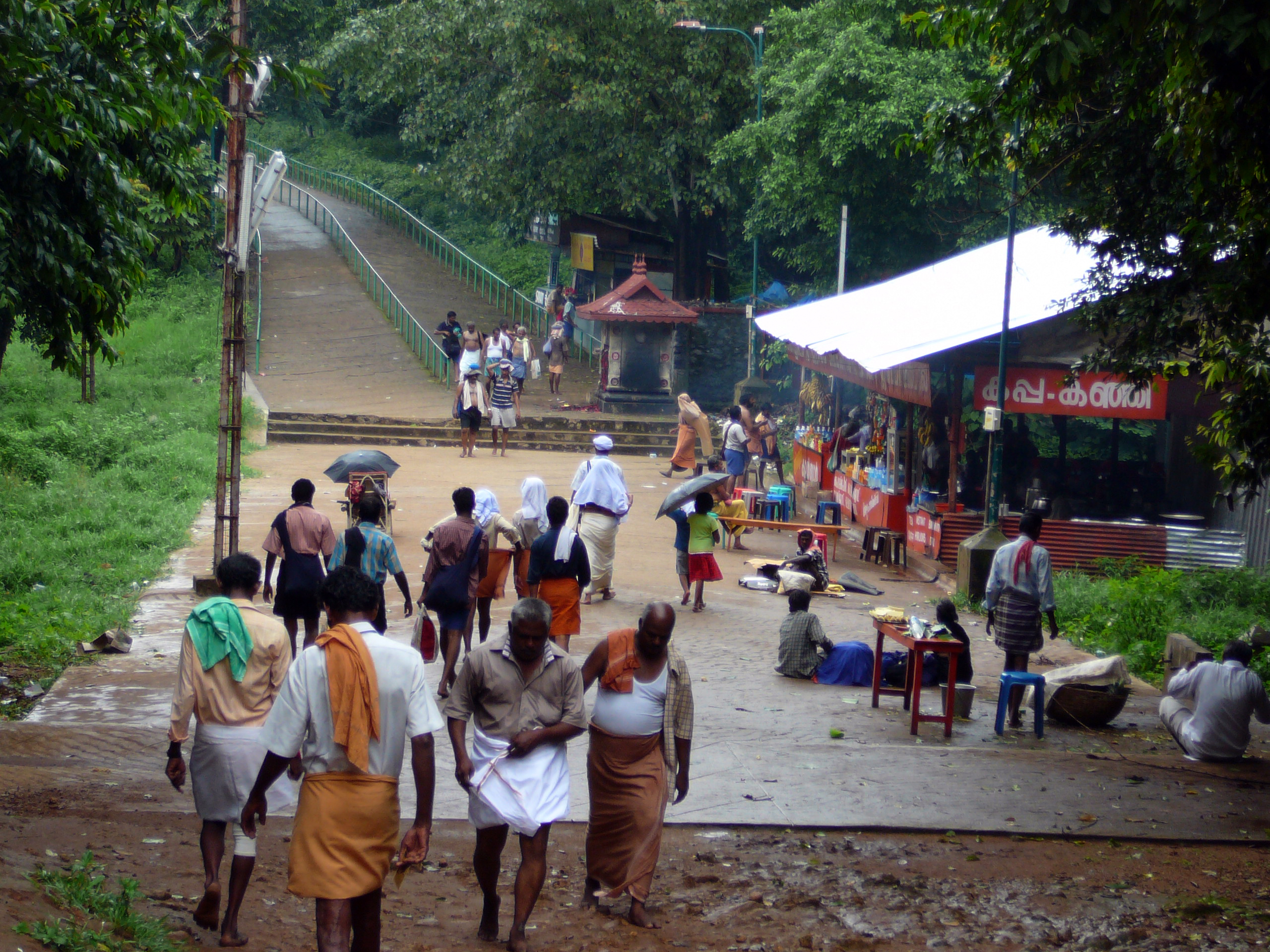
Sabaripeedam

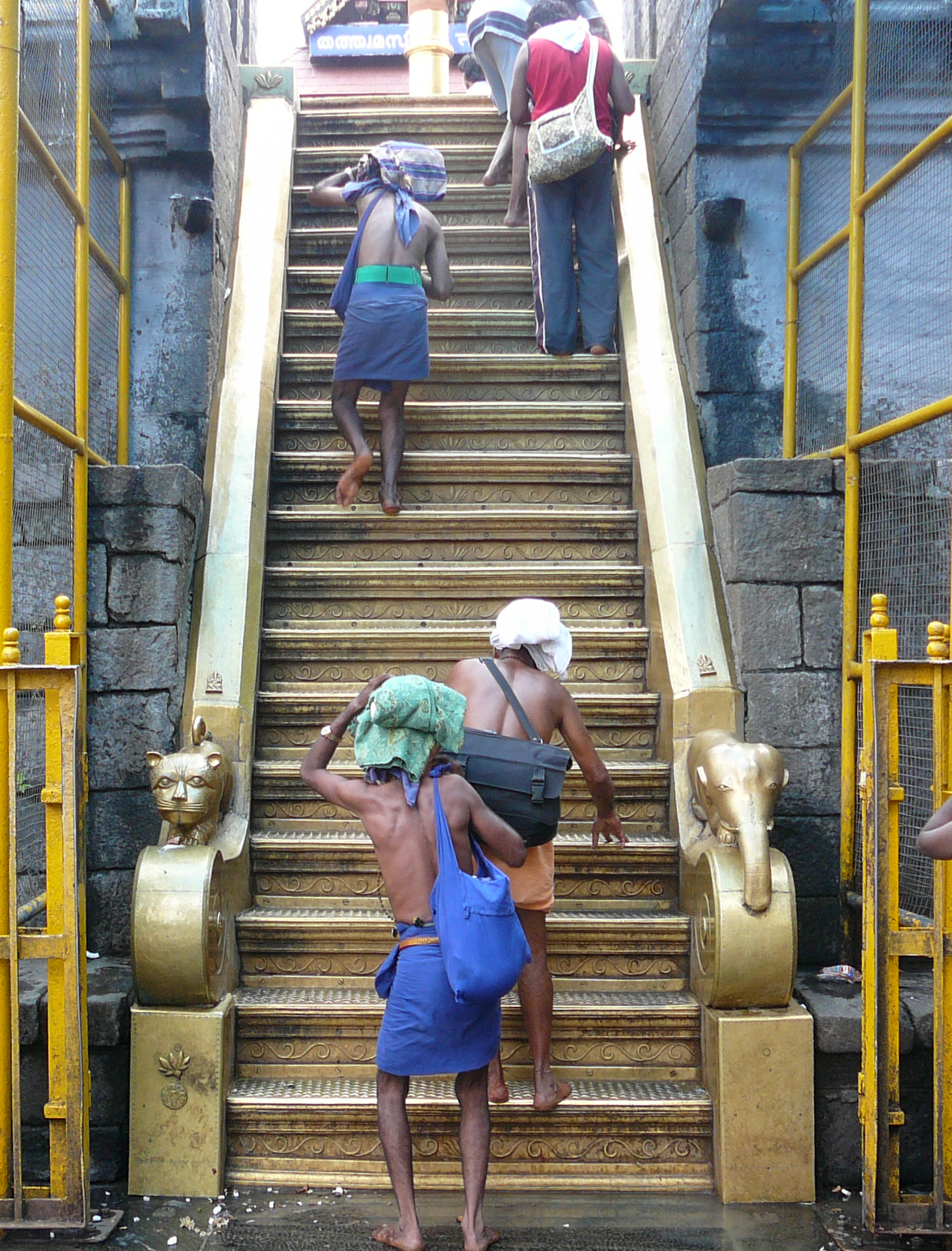
Pathinettampadi, the 18 steps which lead to the sanctum

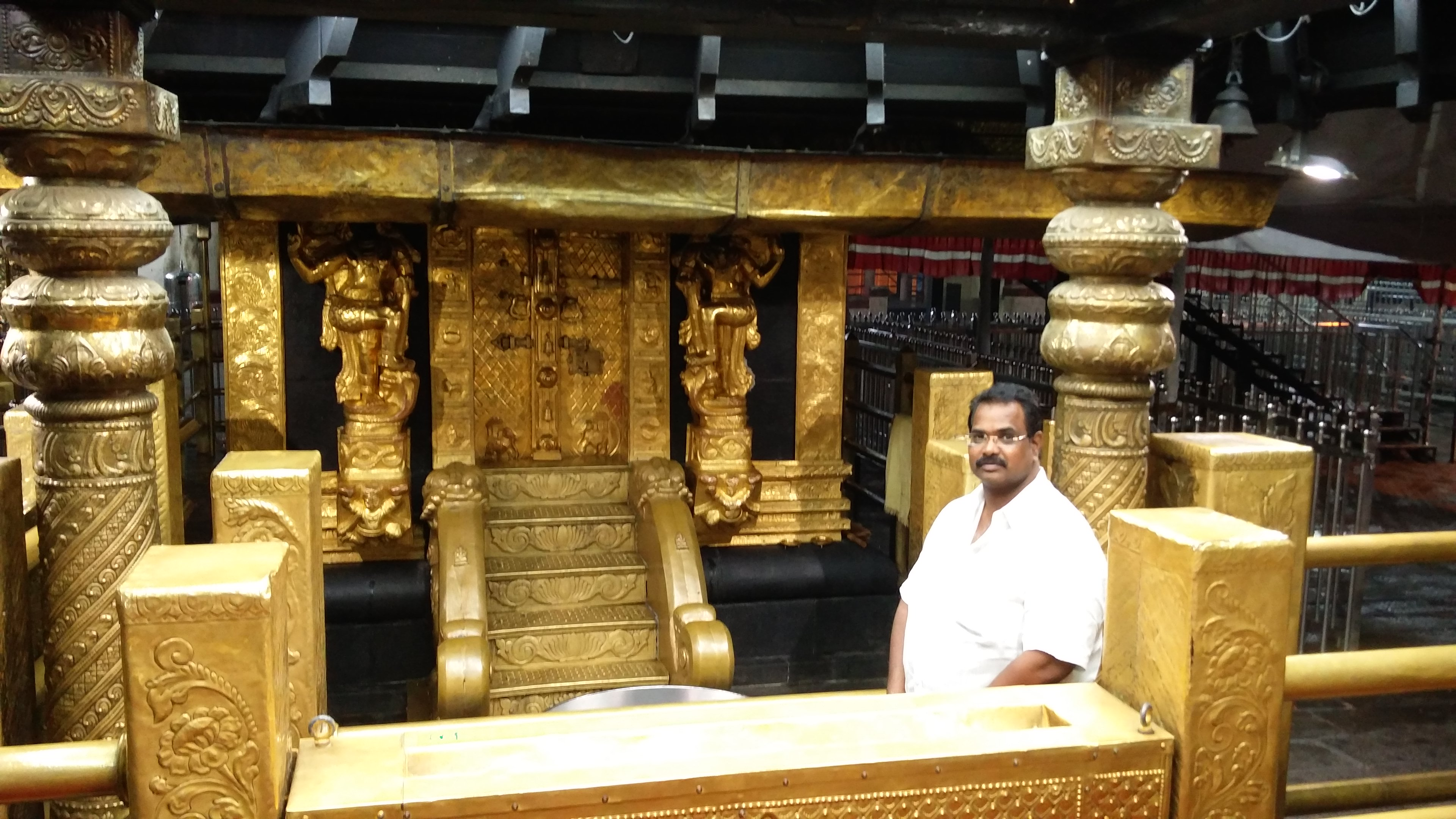
The sanctum sanctorum

=== History ===
The Sabarimala temple does not have any ancient or medieval references. Nevertheless, there are extant late medieval references pertaining to the temple.

The Pandalam royal family drafted a mortgage document in 1793. It states that the royal family is pledging the revenue returns, which encompass the income generated by the Sabarimala Temple, to the Tranvancore state. The earliest surviving written records referencing the Sabarimala temple date back to the 1818, when Lieutenant B. S. Ward provided a description of the temple and noted that approximately 10,000–15,000 devotees attended the five‑day annual festival in January, indicating that the shrine was already an established place of worship by that time. In 1863, Ward and Conner published an article that provided a description of Sabarimala and its vicinity.

In the year 1902, the ruler of Travancore issued a directive for the restoration of the Sabarimala temple, which had suffered damage as a result of a fire incident. Kochummen Muthalali of Polachirackal family, a Mavelikkara resident of Christian faith was awarded the reconstruction contract and carried out the reconstruction. A later reference appears in the Travancore State Manual, compiled by V. Nagam Aiya and published in 1906, which similarly records that over 10,000 pilgrims visited Sabarimala during the annual Mandala Pooja season. In 1929, Diwan Bahadur L. A. Krishna Iyer in his article On some aspects of the worship of Sasta mentions 40,000 pilgrims attended the temple during Makaravilakku.

In the year 1950 the temple was rebuilt after an arson attack. No charges were brought, and the earlier stone image of the deity was replaced by a panchaloha (an alloy of five metals) idol, about one and a half feet tall.

Neelakanta Panicker and his younger brother, Ayyappa Panicker, who are members of the Thattavila Vishwakarma family in Chengannur, Kerala, created the Panchaloha idol to replace the original stone statue of the deity. Edavankadan T.N. Padmanabhan Achari from Mavaelikkara was appointed the supervisor in charge of the new idol by Rajpramukh Sree Chithira Tirunaal Balarama Varma. In the early 1950s, through P. T. Rajan efforts, the present panchaloha idol of Ayyappan was installed at Sabarimalai, and a procession was taken all over Madras state.

In 1969, the flagstaff (dhwajastambha) was installed.

=== Architecture and shrines ===
The Sannidhanam (main temple) is built on a plateau about 40 feet high. The temple consists of a sanctum sanctorum with a gold-plated roof and four golden finials at the top, two mandapams, and the balikalpura, which houses the altar.

The Pathinettaampadi, the 18 sacred steps are the main stairway to the temple. As per the custom followed, no pilgrim without "Irumudikkettu" can ascend the 18 sacred steps. In 1985, the 18 steps were covered by Panchaloha. The temples of Ayyappan's trusted lieutenants, Valiyakadutta Swami is located at the left of Pathinettampadi and the Karuppu Swami & Karuppai Amma is located at the right of the Pathinettaampadi. The northern gate is open for those who do not carry an "Irumudikkettu", as observed in the 1991 Kerala High Court judgement.

Ayyappan's half-brother Kannimoola Ganapathy's shrine is southwest of the sanctum. Devotees offer part of the broken coconut (Neythenga) to the fireplace (Azhi). Ganapati homam is the main offering. The temple of Maalikapurathamma, whose importance is almost on par with that of Ayyappan, is located a few yards from Sannidhanam. It is believed that Ayyappan had specific instructions that he wanted Malikappurath Amma on his left side. Prior to the fire damage, there was only a Peeda Prathishta (holy seat) at Malikappuram. Brahmasree Kandararu Maheswararu Thanthri installed the idol of Malikappurath Amma. The goddess holds a Sankh, Chakram and Varada Abhya Mudra. The idol is now covered with a gold golaka. The temple was also reconstructed in the last decade, and the conical roof and sopanam are also covered with gold.

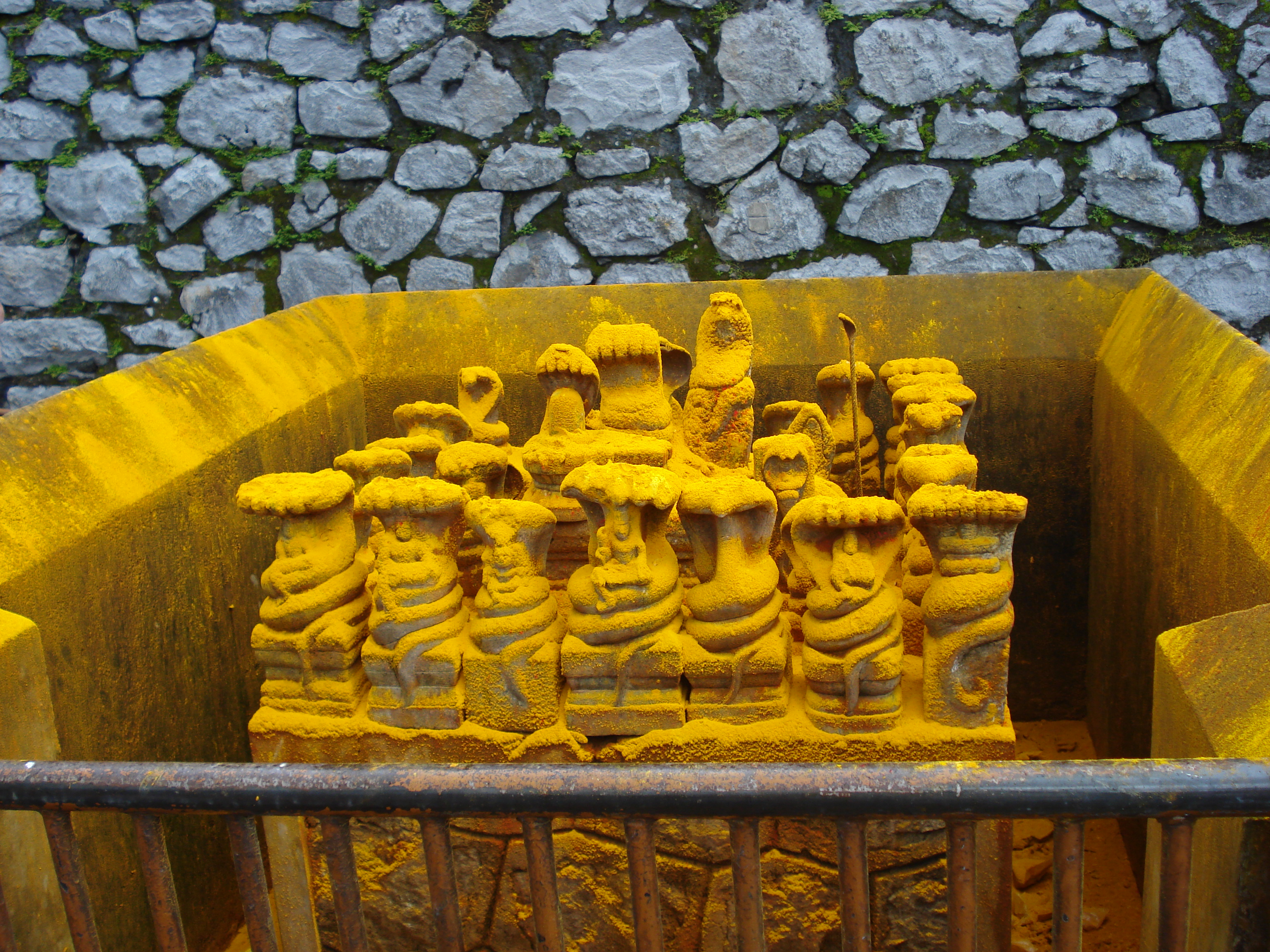
Nagaraja Shrine at Sabarimala

Pilgrims, after the Darsan of Ayyappa and Kannimoola Ganapathi, proceed for their darshan of and give offerings to Nagaraja. The shrines of Nagaraja is in front of the Manimandapam. The shrines of the hill deities is on the left, behind the Malikappurathamma temple.

The Manimandapam is the place where the arrow shot by Lord Ayyappa landed, which he chose as his abode. Its walls are adorned with brass plates depicting embossed scenes and stories associated with Lord Ayyappa. The Manimandapam is open to devotees for only six days during the Makara Vilakku festival.

== Administration ==
The Sabarimala temple is currently administered by the Travancore Devaswom Board (TDB), a statutory autonomous body constituted under the Travancore‑Cochin Hindu Religious Institutions Act XV of 1950. The Board is responsible for managing temple properties, rituals, festivals, and pilgrim welfare.

Historically the members of the Mala Araya tribal community, around the Sabarimala claims to have performed rituals at the Sabarimala shrine prior to the arrival of Brahmin priests. According to tribal leaders, until the 19th century the Mala Arayas conducted rites such as the thenabhishekam (bathing of the Ayyappa idol with honey) and the lighting of the Makara Jyothi before these practices were replaced by Brahmin ritual forms administered by priests from the Thazhamon Madom family. Tribal representatives have further claimed that the Mala Araya community was displaced by the Pandalam royal family in the 1800s, and that Brahminisation of rituals followed, with the Thazhamon family taking over priestly duties after this period. Thazhamon Madom, during the King's rule appointed was the traditional priest of Sabarimala Temple. Tantri is the highest priest and is the head of the temple. It's the duty of the family to decide on religious matters relating to Sabarimala shrine. Tantris are to be present in all ceremonial Poojas and functions to be held at temple premises and functions associated with temple.

As of November 2025, after Kerala High Court order, Travancore Devaswom Board (TDB) allows 5000 devotees per day.

== Religious Practices ==
=== Harivarasanam: Devotional Lullaby Sung ===
The Harivarasanam is a century-old devotional lullaby sung to Lord Ayyappa at Sabarimala when the temple closes for the night, symbolically putting the deity to sleep. Its written in Sanskritised Malayalam and is written in astakam (eight stanza) metre.

Vadakkathillathu Eswaran Namoothiri, who held the position of melsanthi, a chief priest, started the tradition of singing keerthan in the year 1950. Following the Athazhapooja, he performed the recitation of Harivarasanam, a Sanskrit Urakkupattu (lullaby). The recitation takes place nightly before the closing of the temple entrance. The keerthan can be found in the Sasthasthuti kadambam, a publication authored by Kambankudi Sundaram Kulathu Ayyer. The song depicts Ayappa as Hariharaputhra, a deity revered in the Vedas.

=== Neyyabhishekam: Sacred Offerings to the Deity ===
This significant ritual involves pouring sacred ghee brought by pilgrims in their Pallikettu or Irumudi (a two-compartment bag made of handwoven cotton for the offerings for Sabarimala Temple carried on their heads) on the idol of Ayyappan. It symbolically means the merging of Jeevatma with the Paramatma.

=== Prasadam: Distribution of Blessed Food ===
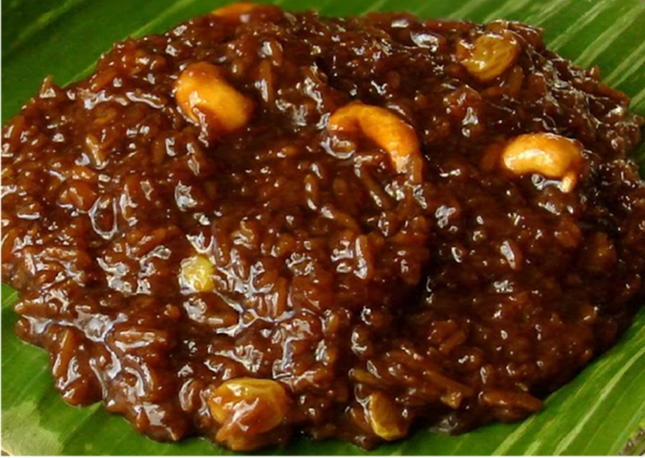
Aravana Payasam

The prasadam at Sabarimala temple are Aravana payasam and Appam. An 'Appam' is a sweet ball composed of rice, kadalippazham, and ghee, whereas 'Arvana' refers to a dense and sweet dessert. The term aravana is explained as being formed by combining ‘ara’ from ari (Malayalam for rice), ‘va’ from vellam (Malayalam for water), and ‘na’ from neyy (Malayalam for ghee), which later transformed into ‘ṇa’.

The Chief Commissioner, Travancore Devaswom Board, said that the board has appointed the Central Food Technological Research Institute, Mysore, as a consultant for providing technical guidance to ensure the quality of Aravana, Appam, and other prasadam preparations at Sabarimala temple.

=== Festival ===
==== Makara Vilakku: The Light of Capricorn Festival. ====
Makaravilakku is an annual festival held on Makara Sankranti in Kerala, India at the shrine of Sabarimala. Makara Vilakku or Makara Sankranti in Sanskrit means the festival of the zodiac sign Capricorn. The festival includes the Thiruvabharanam (sacred ornaments of the deity Ayyappan) procession and a congregation at the hill shrine of Sabarimala. An estimated half a million devotees flow to Sabarimala every year to have a darshan (glimpse) of this ritual this day.

==== Makarajyoti: Celestial Light related to Makar Sankranti Capricorn Festival ====
Makara Jyothi is the name given to the celestial star Sirius. It appears at the moment of Makar Sankranti, after which the holy arti is performed and the lighting of the Makaravilakku at Ponnambalamedu shall begin.

=== Pilgrimage ===
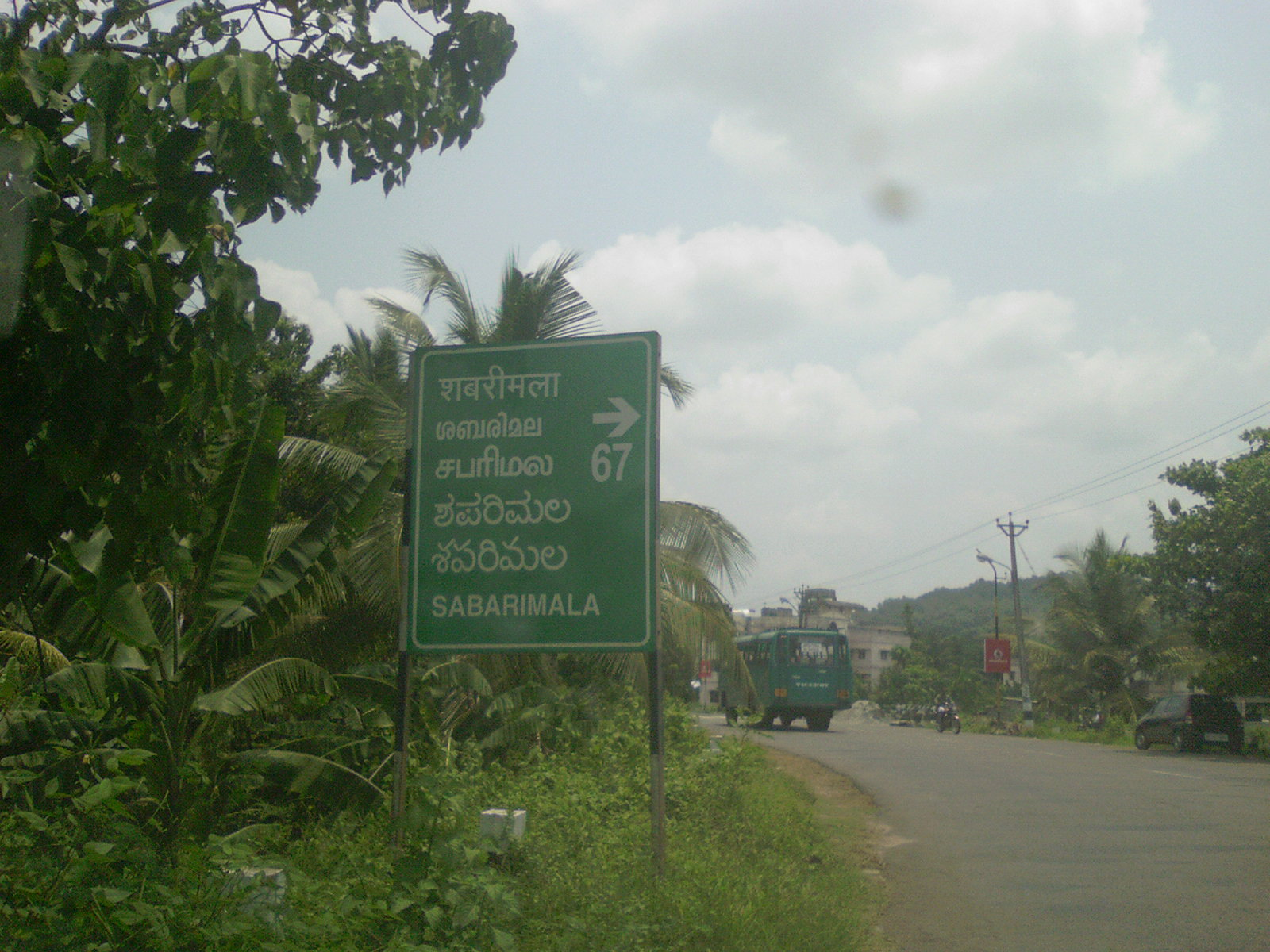
A sign-board that indicates the direction to Sabarimala. The multilingual board is written in Hindi, Malayalam, Tamil, Kannada, Telugu and English (in that order, from top to bottom).

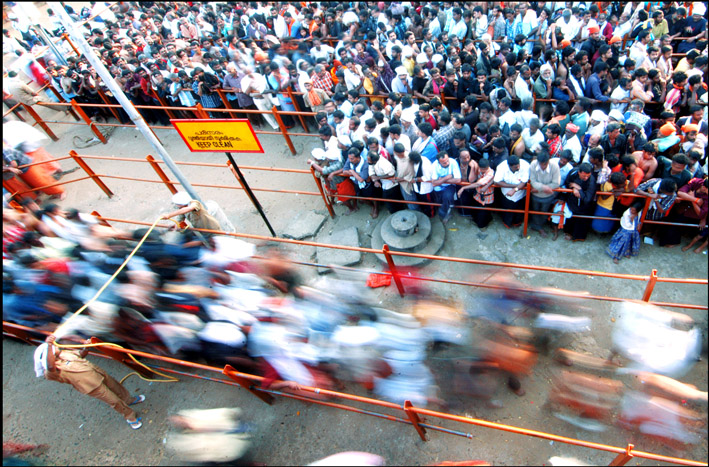
Crowd management of pilgrims.

==== Traditional 41 days pilgrimage ====
The duration of the pilgrimage to the Sabarimala temple is predetermined. Furthermore, the pilgrims are required to undergo various stages of the pilgrimage in an orderly manner.

The pilgrimage to Sabarimala starts on the first day of Vrischika month of the Malayalam calendar (with Scorpio zodiac) and ends on the 11th day of Dhanu month (during Sagittarius). This duration of the 41-day pilgrimage is known as mandala (season) and falls in the months of December and January of the Gregorian calendar.

The devotees are expected to follow a Vratham (a 41-day austerity period) prior to the pilgrimage. This begins with wearing a special Mala (necklace) commonly of Rudraksha or Tulasi beads, although other types of chains are also available. During the 41 days of the pious devotion, the devotees take a vow of lacto-vegetarian diet (In India, vegetarianism is synonymous with lacto-vegetarianism), celibacy, teetotalism, not using any profanity, controlling anger, and allow the hair and nails to grow without trimming. They must try to help others, and see everything around them as Ayyappa. They are expected to bathe twice a day and visit the local temples regularly and only wear plain black or blue coloured traditional attire.

Millions of devotees still take the traditional mountainous forest path (approximately 61 km) from Erumely, 12.8 km from Vandiperiyar and 8 km from Chalakayam, believed to be taken by Ayyappa himself. The Erumely route starts from Erumely to Aludha river, then crosses the Aludha mountain to reach Karivilam thodu. Now comes the sacred Karimala crossing, from there to Cheriyanavattom, Valliyanavattom and finally Pamba River. Then they have to climb Neelimala and enter the Ganesha-Bettam, Shreerama-Betta Padam. Then comes the Aranmula kottaram, which is one of the stops of holy journey Thiruvabharana Ghoshayatra (the grand procession of the divine jewelry).

Many of these Hindu pilgrims also visit a mosque in Erumely dedicated to Vavar, a Muslim saint who according to tradition was a devotee of Ayyappan.

==== Shorter pilgrimage ====
These days people use vehicles to reach the Pamba River by an alternate route. From Pamba, all the pilgrims begin trekking the steep mountain path of Neeli Mala till Sabari Mala. This route is now properly paved, with emergency shops and medical aid by the side, and supporting aid is provided to the pilgrims while climbing the steep slope, which used to be a mere trail through dense jungle. Elderly pilgrims are carried by men on bamboo chairs to the top, for a payment.

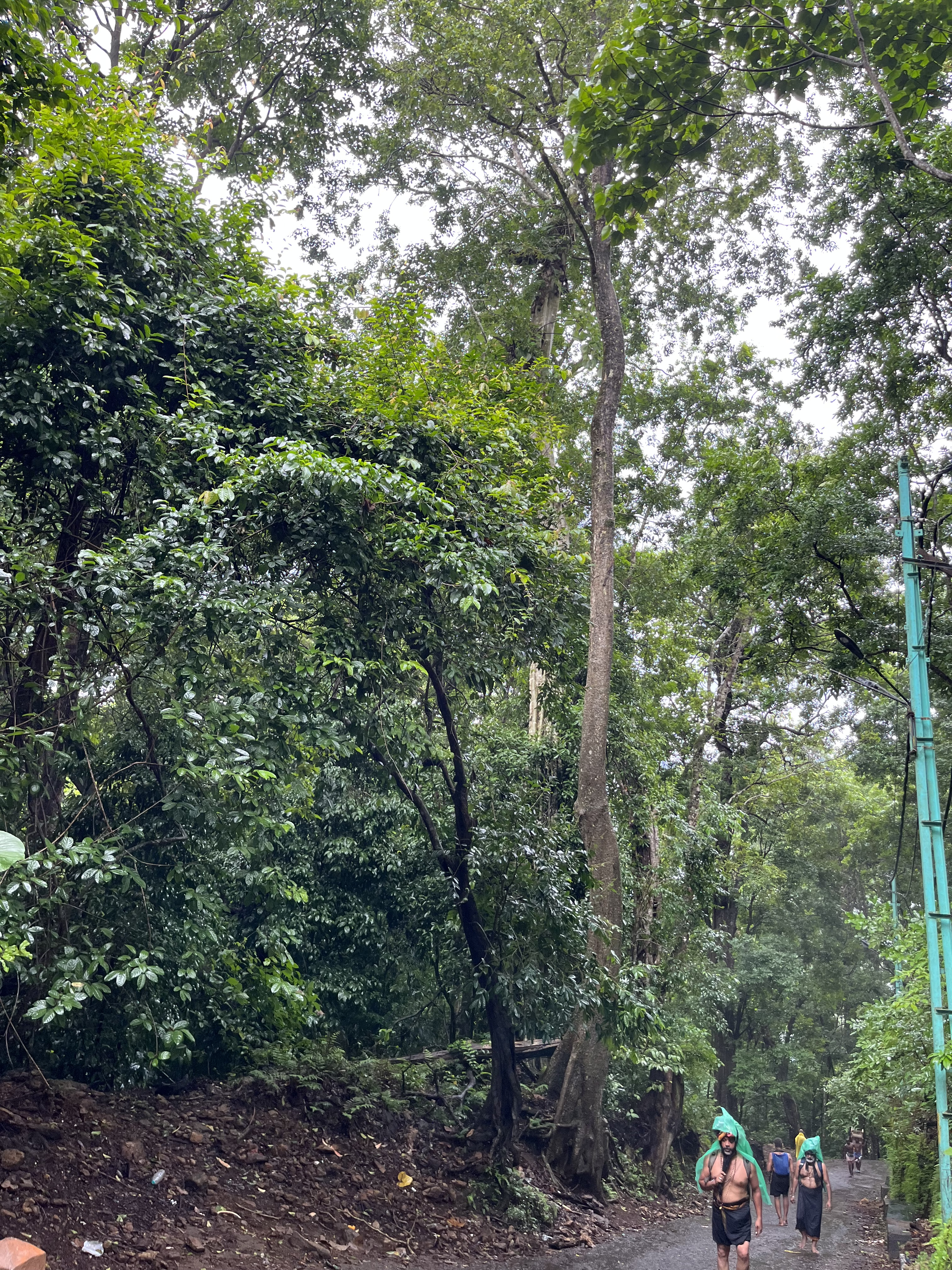
Pilgrims trekking on the path through forests leading to Sabarimala temple

== Transport ==
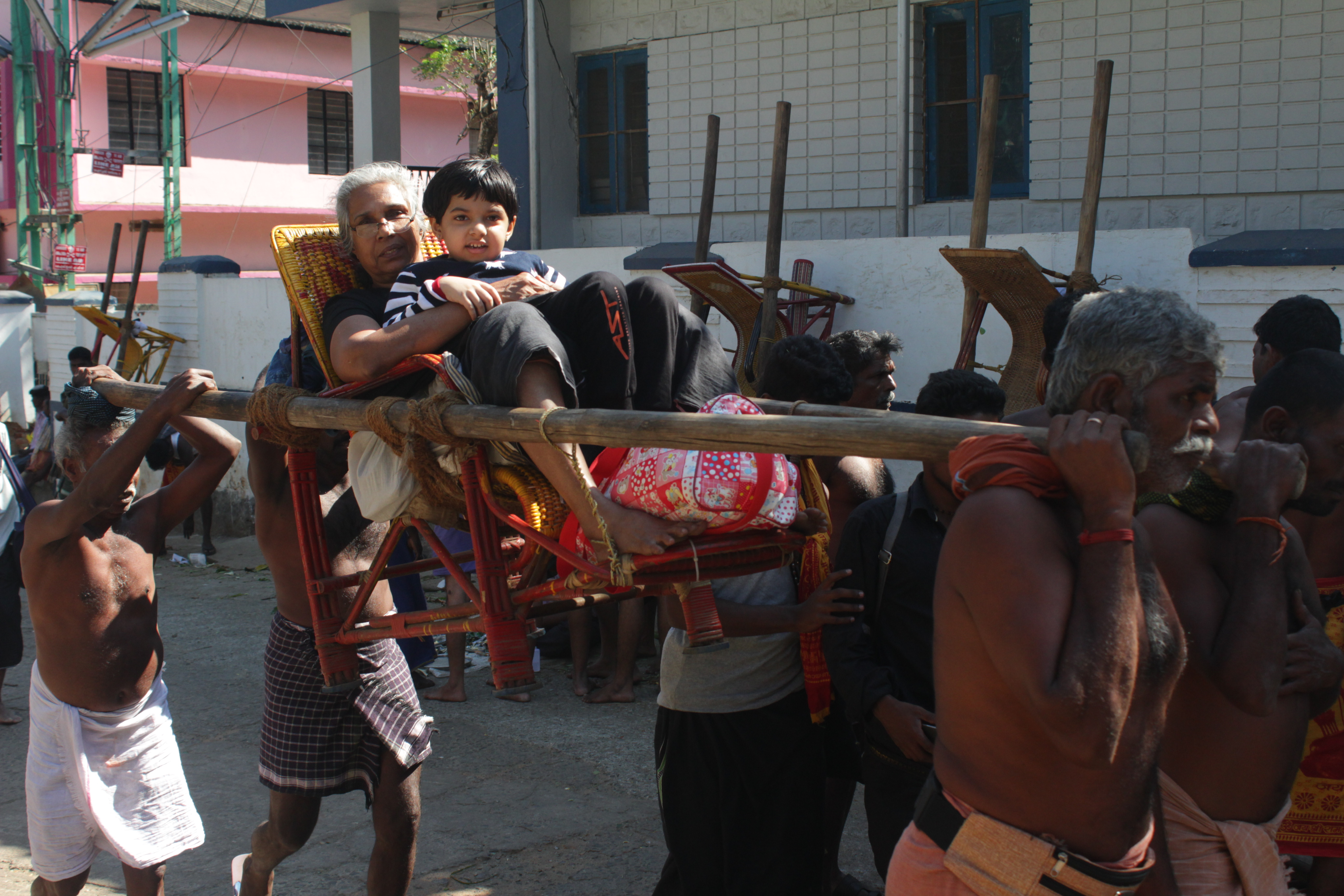
Doli service in Sabarimala

KSRTC Busses are available to various places across Kerala including Chengannur, Thiruvalla & Kottayam Railway stations.

=== Air ===
The nearest airports are Thiruvananthapuram International Airport (170 kilometres (110 mi) south) and Cochin International Airport (160 kilometres (99 mi) northwest). The state government has also approved the construction of the greenfield Sabarimala Greenfield Airport (50 kilometres (31 mi) west) close to the Sabarimala shrine.

=== Railway ===
The nearest railway station is Chengannur known as the Gateway of Sabarimala. Chengannur (85 kilometres (53 mi) west), Tiruvalla(87 kilometres (54 mi) west)Kottayam (96 kilometres (60 mi) northwest) are some of the closest accessible railway stations from Sabarimala.

If the train is via Shengottai - Kollam route, Punalur (101 kilometres (63 mi) will be the nearest station.

=== Road and bus ===
Special buses are arranged from different parts of the state to provide transportation to Kerala in anticipation of the yearly Mandala and Makaravilakku poojas performed at the temple dedicated to Lord Ayyappa Swamy.

=== Ropeway ===
Sabarimala Ropeway, proposed project conceived in 2011, received impetus for construction when National Board for Wildlife (NBWL) of India granted the forests and environmental approval in August 2025.

== Issues and conservation ==
=== Gold theft ===
Sabarimala gold theft controversy involves the misappropriation and theft of approximately 4.5–12 kg of gold (valued at around ₹100 crore) used in the gold plating of the Dwarapalaka idols and other temple artifacts at the Sabarimala Temple, as revealed through audits and court scrutiny of the Travancore Devaswom Board's (TDB) handling of devotee offerings and restoration works. The issue traces back to repeated removals of gold-plated copper panels in 2019 and 2025 for repairs at workshops in Hyderabad and Chennai, where discrepancies in weight and gold content emerged, including faded plating just months after restoration and the re-engagement of a questionable sponsor, Unnikrishnan Potti (also known as Potty), despite prior concerns; on 28 September 2025, two pedestals belonging to temple were recovered from Potti's sister's residence in Thiruvananthapuram amid claims he intended to repurpose the gold for a wedding. Triggered by a Kerala High Court petition, the TDB filed a police complaint in early October, describing initial findings as "minor pilferage" rather than organized theft, while the Sabarimala Karma Samithi (SKS) lodged a separate FIR alleging criminal breach of trust and looting. The opposition United Democratic Front (UDF) and BJP accused the ruling Left Democratic Front (LDF) government of corruption, cover-ups, and negligence—demanding CBI involvement and resignations—leading to Assembly disruptions and statewide agitations, whereas the LDF dismissed the claims as politically motivated electioneering ahead of Lok Sabha polls. As of 9 October 2025, the Kerala High Court has ordered the formation of a confidential Special Investigation Team (SIT) on 6 October, led by former SP S. Sasidharan and overseen by ADGP H. Venkatesh, to probe the matter comprehensively, including gold usage from 1998 onward; the SIT, directed to submit a report within six weeks, has begun interrogations (including Potti's statement on 5 October), with no arrests reported yet, though the court has confirmed evidence of theft and mandated the immediate return of artifacts to the temple. The controversy has intensified Kerala's polarized politics, blending temple governance with electoral strategy and underscoring long-standing tensions over Sabarimala's administration, the former Thiruvithamkoor Devaswom Board Presidents Mr. N.Vasu and Mr. A Padmakumar arrested due to the involvements in this case.

The Kerala Special Investigation Team (SIT) has taken into custody Kandararu Rajeevaru, the former Tantri (chief priest) of the Sabarimala Temple, over the alleged disappearance of gold from the Sreekovil door frames. The move came after the Kollam vigilance court granted approval, with the arrest formally recorded while Rajeevaru remains in judicial custody in a related case.

Investigators claim that gold-coated door frames and Dwarapalaka idols sent for plating in 2019 were not returned in their entirety, triggering allegations of misappropriation and possible theft.

=== Celibate main deity and entry of women devotees ===
Temple management places religious restrictions against the entry of women aged 10 to 50. This is based on the tradition of the temple to respect the celibate nature of the deity.

== Sabarimala Temple ==
Areekkara Subrahmanyan Sankaran Namboothiri is the newly selected Melsanthi (chief priest) of the Sabarimala Ayyappa Temple.

According to the Memoir of the Survey of the Travancore and Cochin States, which was published in two volumes by the Madras government in the 19th century, women of menstruating age were denied entry into the Sabarimala temple two centuries ago. Though the authors, lieutenants of the Madras Infantry, completed the survey by the end of the year 1820 after nearly five years of research, it was published in two volumes only in 1893 and 1901. According to the report, girls and women capable of pregnancy are prohibited from approaching the temple, while elderly women and pre-pubescent girls are permitted to do so. This is due to the deity, (Ayyappan), who is venerated as an eternal celibate, having an aversion to any sexual activity in his vicinity.

Up until 1991, women visited the temple, though in small numbers. Female pilgrims below the age of 50 would visit the temple to conduct (Chorroonu), the first rice-feeding ceremony of their infants in the temple's premises.

In 1991, Justices K. Paripoornan and K. Balanarayana Marar of the Kerala High Court, in their ruling against the Travancore Devaswom Board, restricted the entry of women between the ages of 10 and 50 from offering worship at the temple, stating that such a restriction was in accordance with the usage prevalent from time immemorial. In addition, the judges directed the Government of Kerala to use the police force to ensure that restriction was complied with. The high court also stated that "since there is no restriction between one section and another section or between one class and another class among the Hindus in the matter of entry to a temple (Sabarimala), whereas the prohibition is only in respect of women of a particular age group and not women as a class."

On 28 September 2018, the Supreme Court of India, in a 4–1 majority decision (4 men and 1 women judicial panel), overturned the ban on the entry of women. The Chief Justice, Dipak Misra, stated that the selective ban on women was not an "essential part" of Hinduism but instead a form of "religious patriarchy". Justice Dhananjaya Y. Chandrachud stated that the ban "stigamatises" and "stereotypes" women while "placing the burden of men's celibacy" on them. The lone female judge, Indu Malhotra noted in her dissenting judgement that "what constitutes an essential religious practice is for the religious community to decide" and not a matter that should be decided by the courts. She added that "notions of rationality cannot be invoked in matters of religion by courts." After the Supreme Court's decision, there were numerous protests and gatherings in the southern part of Kerala. In response to this ruling, devotees have filed about 65 review petitions. The Supreme Court of India accepted review petitions against its own orders. The Supreme Court has decided to review the petition and hold a public hearing because of the important facts and circumstances of the case.

This led to protests at Nilakkal and Pamba base camps on 17 October 2018, when the temple was opened for the first time after the Supreme Court verdict. Protesters assaulted women journalists, stole their camera equipment, and damaged a vehicle. The police were also attacked. A number of women were among the protesters, checking cars for women of menstruating age and helping with the road blocks. There were also reports of police damaging protesters' motor bikes. Devotees in a large scale all over Kerala and in the southern state of Tamil Nadu, Andra Pradesh and Karnataka, also joined the protests. As part of these protests, on 26 December 2018, devotees lit the 'Ayyappa Jyothi' across the state of Kerala and in Karnataka covering a distance of about 765 km from 6 pm to 6:30 p.m. Thousands joined in the event. The protestors were physically attacked in Kannur and the state government filed cases against 1400 unidentified participants.

People from other religious groups supported the cause of devotees. Prominent Jain Acharya Yugbhushan Suri Maharaj, also known as Pandit Maharaj, has said that sanctity was a religious issue and that it was connected to fundamental religious rights. Commenting on the Sabarimala temple row, Pandit Maharaj told IndiaToday, "Whether it is Sabarimala or Jharkhand's Shikharji, the agitations are for sanctity," adding, "Religion talks about inner belief and sanctity. This should be respected. I am not against the judiciary or the Supreme Court, but they should not overlook the belief of the people." Also, Art of Living founder Ravi Shankar showed support for the rules that have been traditionally followed at the sanctum sanctorum of the Ayyappa Temple in Sabarimala.

Two women of menstruating age attempted to enter the temple on 19 October 2018 but were blocked by protesters about 100 m away. After the Thantri threatened to close the sanctum sanctorum if the women attempted to ascend the 18 sacred steps, they turned back.

On 2 January 2019 at 3:45 AM, for the first time after the Supreme Court verdict, two women in their early 40s were escorted by police into the Sabarimala temple, allegedly through a back gate meant for staff. The Chief Minister of Kerala, Pinarayi Vijayan, confirmed their entry. Thereafter, priests closed the temple for one hour to ritually purify it as the 41-days pilgrimage, known as Mandala kalam or the 41-day austerity period/Vratham, had not been adhered to and the women entered the temple premises violating these traditions.

After the hearing ended in February 2019, the Court, led by the newly appointed Chief Justice, Mr. Ranjan Gagoi, issued an order to send the case to a larger bench of seven judges so that the decision made on 28 September 2018, could be looked at again.

=== Environmental efforts ===
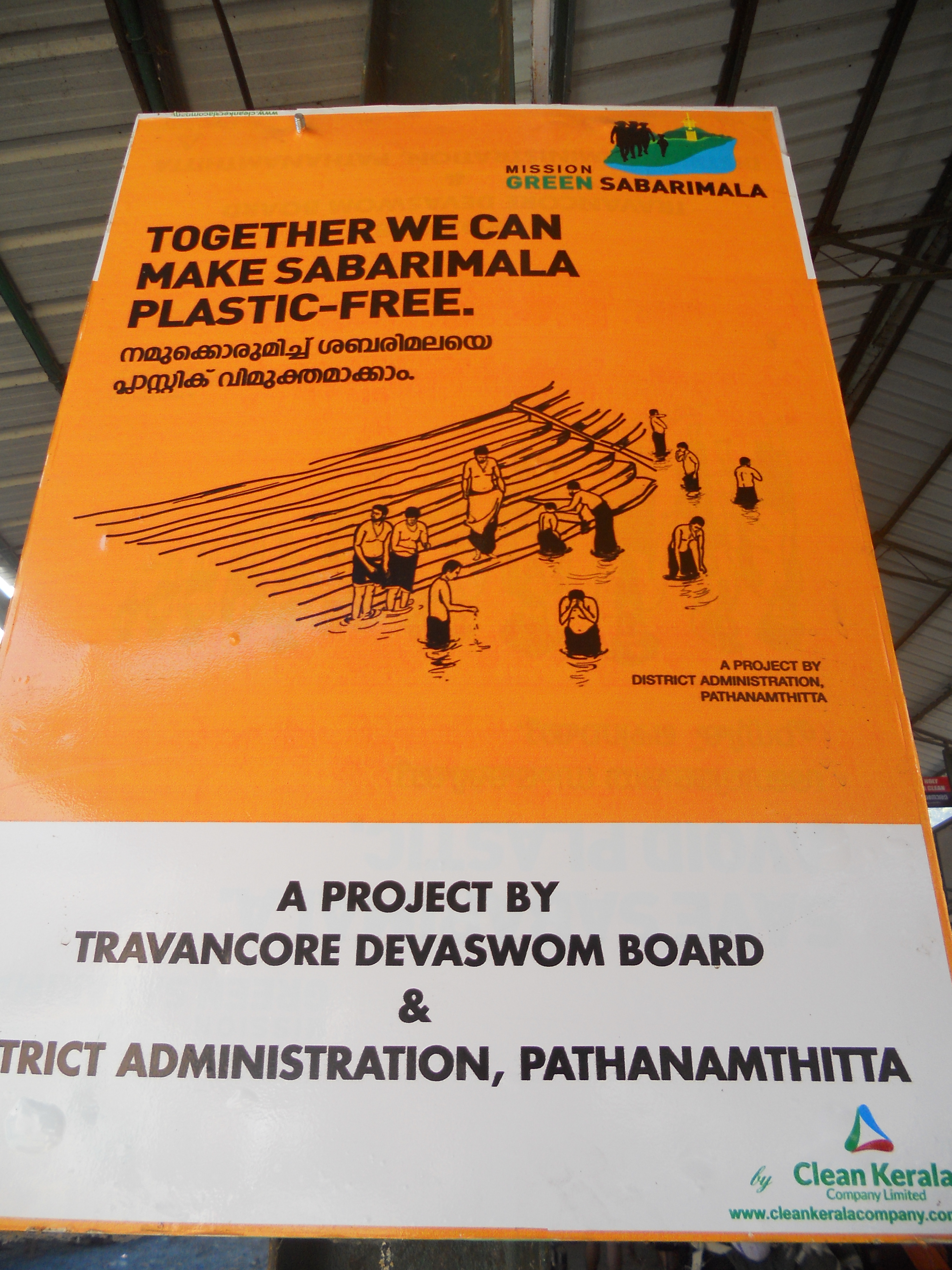
An information signage near Nadappanthal, Sabarimala, inviting all to join hands in making Sabarimala free from plastic and other wastes.

The waste disposed by the devotees to Sabarimala is threatening the wildlife of the region and the evergreen forests. Efforts are on to make Sabarimala free from pollution and waste. High Court of Kerala has directed that 'Irumudikkettu' should not contain plastic materials. Projects like "Punyam Poonkavanam" has been initiated under the aegis of governmental departments. Mata Amritanandamayi Math has been regularly contributing to keep Sabarimala and its precincts clean. While cleaning Pamba river Sabarimala Sanndidhaanam clean is their primary objective, the broader vision is to spread the message of greenness and cleanliness beyond Sabarimala.

Some of the salient aspects of "Punyam Poonkavanam" project includes:

1. Not using soap and oil while bathing in the holy Pamba River. No throwing any material, including clothes in the holy river.
2. To prepare irumudikkettu without using any plastic and using only bio-degradable materials.
3. To devote at least one hour in cleanliness activities at Sabarimala Sannidhaanam, River Pamba and surroundings as part of the pilgrimage.

== See also ==
- Sabarimala Temple complex
  - Maalikapurathamma, Hindu goddess enshrined in a small temple at Sabarimala Ayyappan temple complex
  - Sabarimala Trek, pilgrimage track
  - Vavar, a Muslim devotee of Sabarimala with shrine in Sabarimala temple complex
- Hinduism
  - Hindu pilgrimage sites
  - List of Hindu temples
