= Erumely Sree Dharmasastha Temple =

Hindu temple in Kerala, India

Erumely Sree Dharmasastha temple
- Temple entrance arch

- Erumely Sree Dharmasastha Temple (Kerala) Erumely Sree Dharmasastha Temple (India)

Religion
- Affiliation: Hinduism
- District: Kottayam
- Deity: Ayyappan
- Festival: Thiruulsavam (Kumbham)
- Governing body: Travancore Devaswom Board

Location
- Location: Erumely
- State: Kerala
- Country: India
- Interactive map of Erumely Sree Dharmasastha temple
- Coordinates: 9°28′48.4″N 76°50′38.4″E

Architecture
- Type: Traditional Kerala style
- Elevation: 73 m (240 ft)

Erumely Sree Dharmasastha Temple is a Hindu temple located in the heart of Erumely town in Kottayam district in the Indian state of Kerala. The temple is dedicated to Ayyappa or Dharmasastha. It is also an important meeting place of Sabarimala pilgrims.

== Temple ==
There are two temples in Erumely town. This temple is known as Valiyambalam and the other one is Kochambalam. Both the temples are situated within 0.5 km (0.31 mi). The famous Erumely Pettathullal during Sabarimala pilgrimage is performed near the Valiyambalam and Kochambalam. The Erumely 'Vavar masjid' is also located near to the temple. Pilgrims have the necessary facilities like accommodation, food and water at this temple, provided by Travancore Devaswom Board. 'Tazhmon Mutt' holds the tantric rights of the temple.

== Festival ==
Annual festival (utsavam) is hosted in the month of February (Kumbham) for 10 days and celebrated grandly.

== See also ==
- Sabarimala Trek

== Gallery ==
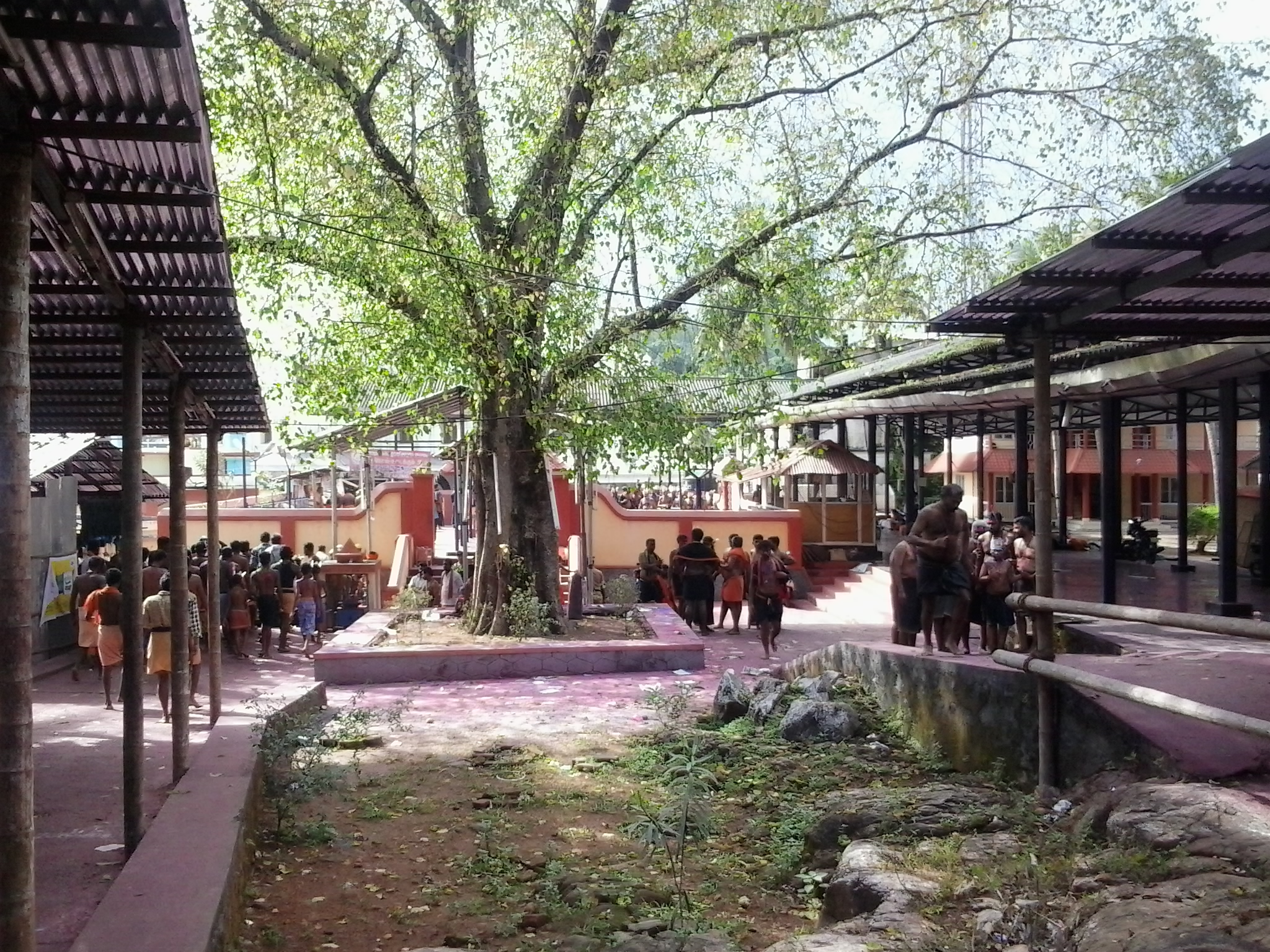
Courtyard of temple

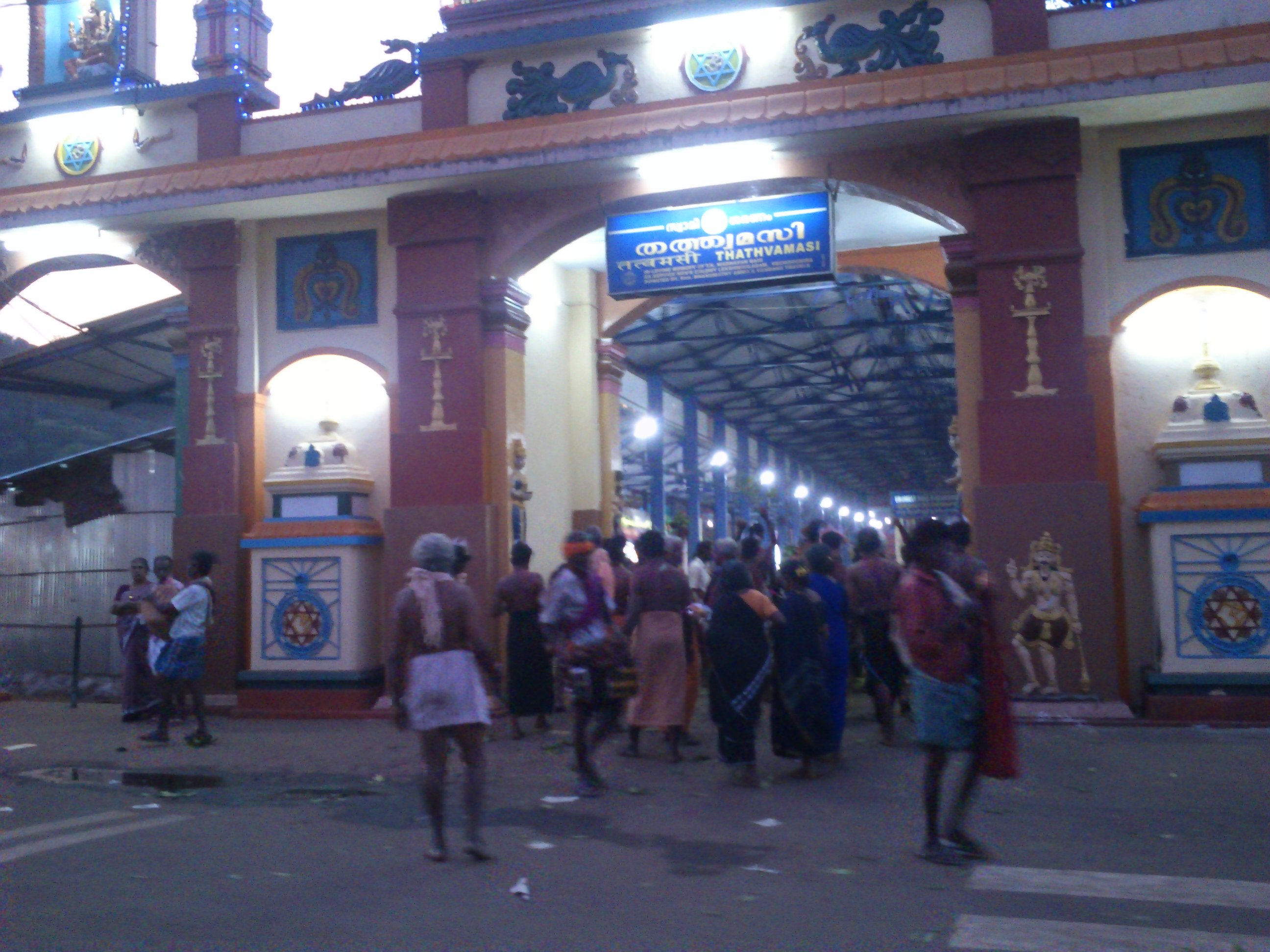
Temple entrance at night
