= Pettathullal =

Ritualistic dance

Pettathullal (പേട്ട തുള്ളൽ), also known as Pettat kettu (പേട്ട കെട്ട്), is a historic ritualistic dance held annually on the 27th of Dhanu at Erumely, in Kottayam district in the Indian state of Kerala during the Mandalam - Makaravilakku period (November, December and January) among thousands of devotees. It depicts the joyfulness of people over the slaying of Mahishi by Ayyappa. Two groups actively participate in the thullal, one from Ambalappuzha and other from Aalangadu. The Ambalappuzha group starts their journey to Erumely on the 22nd of Dhanu and a couple of days before the thullal. They visit the Manimala Bhagavathy temple on 25th Dhanu and perform an Aazhi pooja. Before the Ambalappuzha thullal, a Krishna parunth (sacred eagle) flies around in the sky. It is believed that Vishnu himself arrives from Ambalappuzha Sree Krishna temple on his mount Garuda to witness the thullal.

== Ritual ==
Petta Sastha temple, the starting point of Pettathullal

The custom of Pettathullal starts with 'Prayashchitham' or atonement which is done to seek forgiveness for the intentional and unintentional sins committed during the vrata kalam (fasting period) by placing a coin and betel leaf on the holy irumudikettu or travel kit. The next custom is the offering of Pettapanam kettal or Dakshina to Periyaswami. The kanni Ayyappas are instructed to carry a bundle, tied to a stick on their shoulders, which will be filled by vegetables and cereals.

The pilgrims participating in Pettathullal often come in groups and chant "Ayyappa thinthakathom, Swamy thinthakathom". They dress like tribes with their bodies and faces smeared by colours and charcoal and carry weapons such as sarakkol (arrows) and wooden maces. An important element is that of 'Kanni Ayyappas', where the first-timers to Sabarimala must participate in the thullal by holding a wooden arrow. The thullal is accompanied by instrumental music such as Chenda melam, Nagaswaram, Pambamelam, mantras, and hymns that begin at the Petta Sree Dharmasastha temple (Kochambalam) adjacent to the Vavar masjid.

The pilgrims then proceed to Vavar mosque and are harmoniously welcomed by Mahallu Jamaat committee members. After taking a circuit around the mosque, a representative of Vavar accompanies the group to the Sastha temple (Valiyambalam) about 0.5 km away. The thullal of Alangadu group is held in the afternoon. The Aalangadu group expects a star to twinkle in the sky before the sunset. The festivities end with a circuit of the temple by the pilgrims.

== See also ==
- Sabarimala Trek
