= Kalaketty =

- village
- Location in Kerala, India
- Coordinates: 9°26′45.43″N 76°53′54.6″E
- Country: India
- State: Kerala
- District: Kottayam

Government
  - Type: Panchayath
  - Body: Erumely grama panchayath

Languages
  - Official: Malayalam
- Time zone: UTC+5:30 (IST)
- PIN: 686510
- Area code: 04828
- Vehicle registration: KL-34
- Nearest cities: Koruthodu, Mundakkayam
- Lok Sabha constituency: Pathanamthitta
- Climate: Tropical monsoon
- Nearest Airport: Cochin International Airport Limited

Kalaketty is a village in the Erumely panchayath of Kanjirappally tehsil in the Kottayam district of Kerala state, India. Many Shiva devotees pass through Kalaketty during the Makaravilakku festival period, as the local temple is an important landmark as well as an idathavalam for them. One of the famous Malayalam movie Varnapakittu was shot at this place.

== Location ==
Kalaketty is located on the Mundakkayam - Kanamala route. The footpath to Sabarimala passes through Kalaketty, which starts from Peroorthodu near Erumely. It is about 19 km (12 mi) from Erumely, 18 km (11 mi) from Mundakkayam, 8 km (5.0 mi) from Thulappally, 4 km (2.5 mi) from Koruthodu and 4 km (2.5 mi) from Kanamala.

== Legend ==
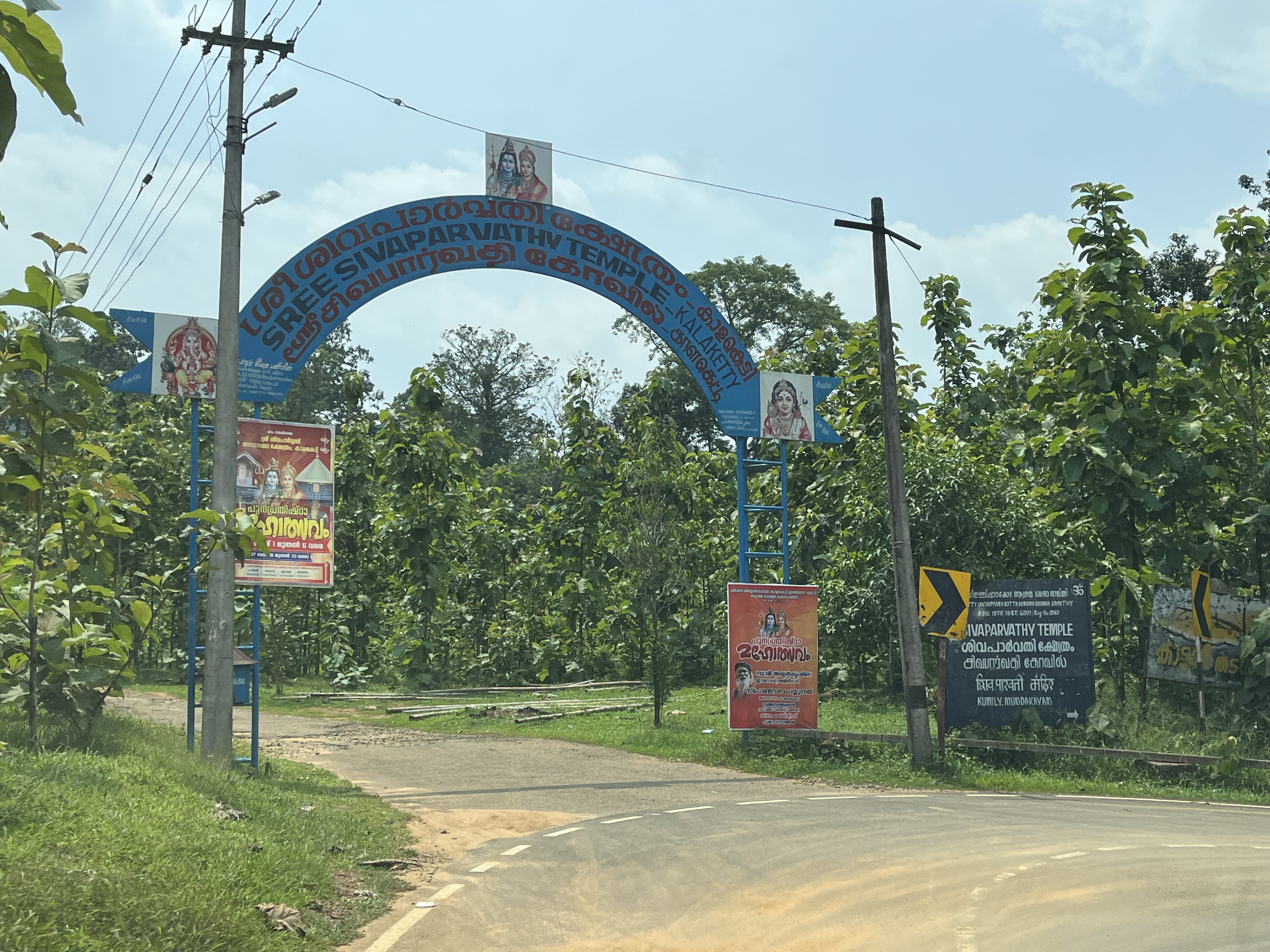
Entrance to Kalaketty Shiva Parvati temple

According to legend, Kalaketty is the spot where Lord Shiva and Goddess Parvati waited for Ayyappan after he defeated Mahishi. It is believed that Nandi, was tied to an Anjili tree at this location, which is how the area reportedly got its name. There is a shrine dedicated to Shiva-Parvati.
