= Cheerappanchira =

Ancient noble Ezhava family

Cheerappanchira is an ancient noble Ezhava family renowned for its Kalari in Muhamma, Alappuzha District. According to legend, Lord Ayyappan came here to learn Kalaripayattu. A. K. Gopalan married Susheela Gopalan from the cheerappanchira tharawad. C. K. Chandrappan also hails from this tharawad.

== Cheerappanchira family ==
The Cheerappanchira family, according to their family history, originates from Kadathanadu and were known for their proficiency in Kalaripayattu. The headman of the family holds the title 'Panicker' and known as in the name of 'Cheerappanchira Panicker'.

== Lord Ayyappan ==
According to legend, Lord Ayyappan came to Muhamma, Alappuzha District to learn Kalaripayattu. He was introduced by a person named 'Vellutha' as his close relative because the Cheerappanchira Panickers were less willing to train someone from outside their country. They were focused on training soldiers from their own kingdom. Ayyappan started his martial arts training in Cheerappanchira Kalari hiding his true identity as the Prince of Pandalam.

Maalikapurathamma was the daughter of Cheerappanchira Panikkar, who taught Kalaripayattu to Lord Ayyappa. Her real name was Lalithambika, also known as Poongodi. She used to train Ayyappan in Kalari when her father was not available. Eventually, Ayyappan and Pongodi both fell in love with each other, but they could not unite due to reasons that remain historically unclear, apart from legend and belief stories

Ayyappan, before going to an imminent war with a bandit visited Cheerappanchira Kalari in order to gather enough soldiers from the Cheerappanchira Kalari, and to seek blessings from his Guru, Cheerappanchira Pancicker. At that time, Cheerappanchira Pancicker had gone to his 'moola-tharwad' (family origin) at Kadathanadu in Vadakara. Upon hearing this, Ayyappan left his body armor at Cheerappanchira as a message for him upon his return. This body armor of Lord Ayyappa is still preserved in Cheerappanchira.

== Sabarimala and Mukkal Vettom temples ==
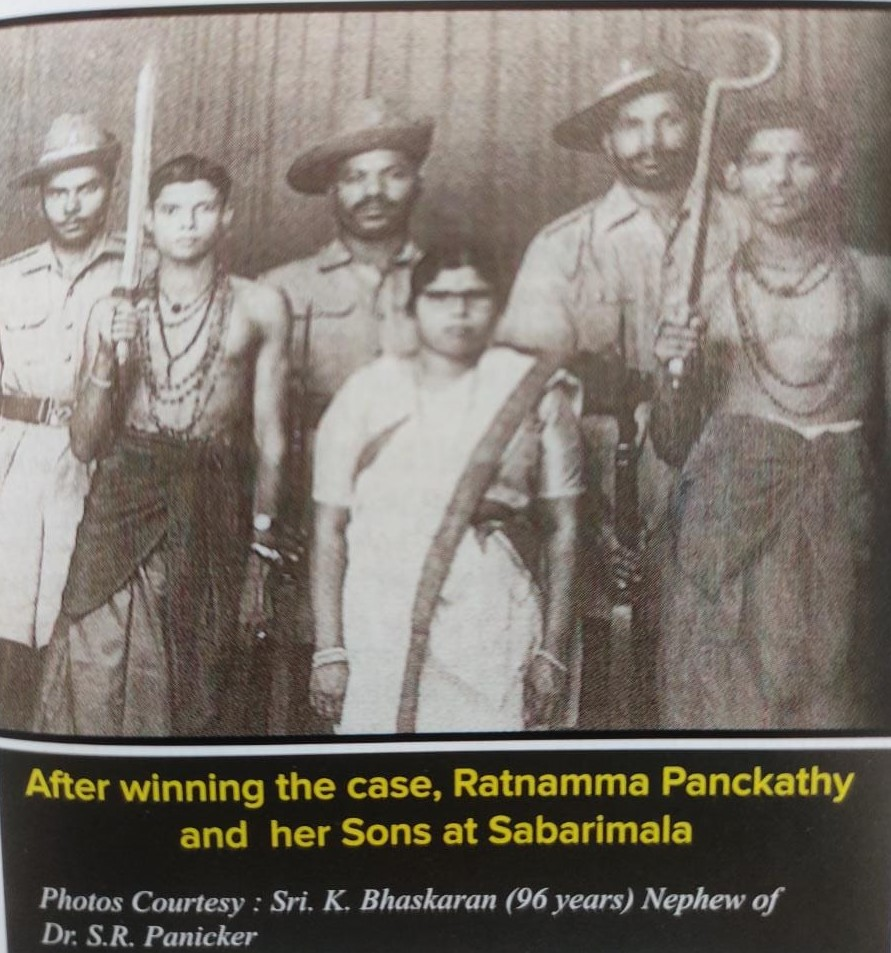
After winning the case and gaining hereditary rights to conduct fireworks at Sabarimala, Ratnamma Panickathy from Cheerappanchira and her sons at Sabarimala.

There is also a Mukkalvetti Ayyappa temple at Muhamma, devoted to Lord Ayyappa and rest in Sabarimala.

Mukkal Vettom Ayyappa Temple was built by the Cheerappanchira in the tharavadu because the elders of the family were not able to go for pilgrimage to Sabarimala.

The importance of the relation of these two ancient temples is evidenced by the Thirupattaya Charthu (the royal decree) of the Pandalam King, by which the right to conduct the fireworks offerings at Sabarimala was given to Cheerappanchira family. Till this date, people of old age and women who can't undertake a pilgrimage to Sabarimala come to this temple to offer their prayers on the belief that, by the darshan at Mukkal vettom, Ayyappan will shower the same blessings as the darsan at Sabarimala. In 2001, as instructed by the Ashtamangala Deva Prasnam, (the astrological findings) held at Sabarimala, Sabarimala temple authorities conducted special poojas and offerings as penance at this temple.

== Swamy Muttom or Mutt ==
The Kudil (Hermitage) where Ayyappan lived during the period of his martial art training has been preserved in its original form by successive generations of the Cheerappanchira family. Sree Narayana Guru, during his visit to this family, used this Kudil. Hence it has got the name Swamy Muttom.

== See also ==
- Makara Jyothi
