= Sabarimala Trek =

Tourist attraction in India

Sabarimala orappanavilai
- Length: 46 kilometres (29 mi)
- Location: Kottayam district, Pathanamthitta district
- Use: Trekking
- Highest point: Karimala
- Difficulty: Easy to strenuous
- Season: Mandala - Makaravilakku period
- Hazards: Thick forests Steep slopes Leeches; Venomous snakes Elephants; Tigers; Wild boars

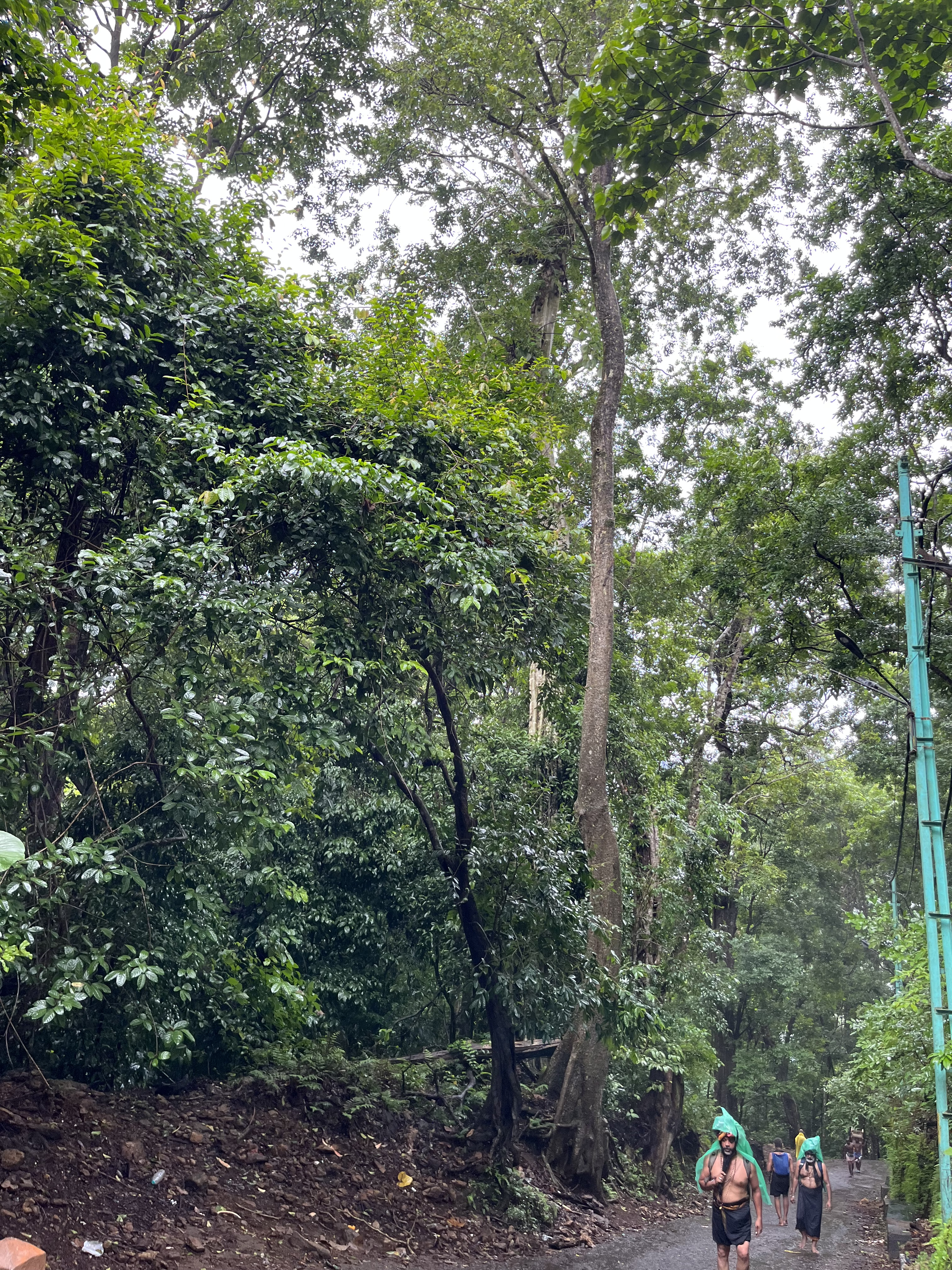
Pilgrims trekking on the path through forests leading to Sabarimala

Sabarimala Trek is an important trek route to Sannidhanam, the abode of Ayyappan. It covers a distance of about 46 kilometres (29 mi) through the mountainous terrains and thick forests which are inhabited by many wild animals. It is believed that Ayyappa used this path in his expedition to kill Mahishi, a demoness. Even now, many pilgrims heading towards Sabarimala use this route, especially the pilgrims from Kerala, Andhra Pradesh, Telangana, Karnataka and Tamil Nadu.

== Important stops on way to Pamba ==
=== Erumely ===
This is the starting point of the trek. Most devotees visit the mosque/mausoleum of Vavar Swamy situated in Erumely. It is believed that Vavar swamy (a Muslim devotee of Ayyappa) protects devotees travelling through the Erumely pathway.

=== Peroorthodu ===
Peroorthodu is a stream-crossing as well as the first stop on this path, almost 4 km (2.5 mi) from Erumely. Devotees often bathe here and the Kanniayyappas offers "Malarpodi" and "Aripodi" before their journey. This spot is where Lord Ayyappa is said to have rested during his travels and marks the beginning of the climb to Sabarimala hills. Pilgrims perform a ritual here by giving alms to symbolize seeking refuge in Ayyappa. The forest just beyond, called Poongavanam, is revered as 'Ayyappa's garden'.

=== Kalaketty ===
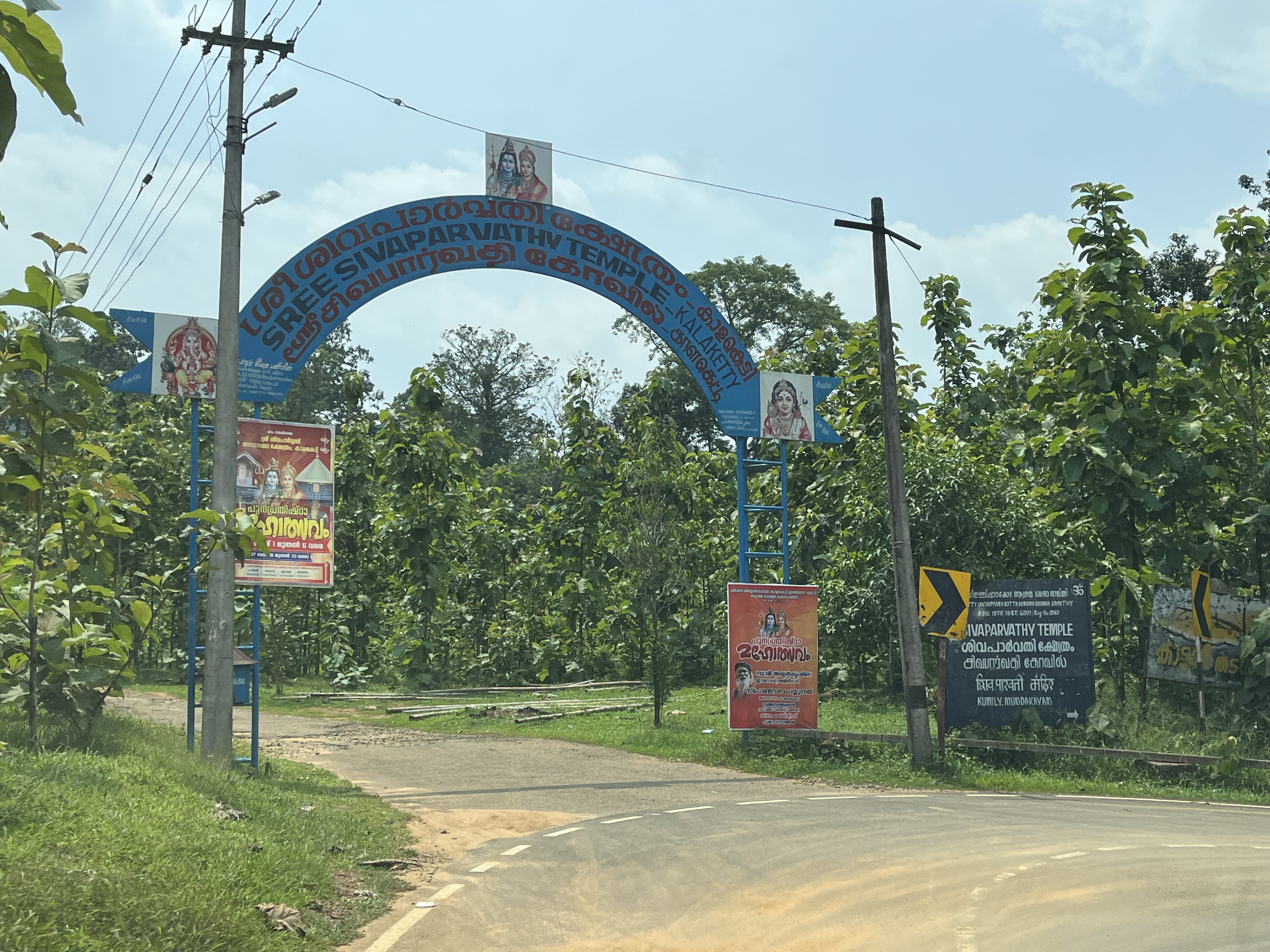
Entrance to Kalaketty Shiva Parvati temple

Kalaketty is situated about 6 kilometres (3.7 mi) from Perurthodu. According to legend, Kalaketty is the spot where Lord Shiva and Goddess Parvati waited for Ayyappan after he defeated Mahishi. It is believed that Nandi, was tied to an Anjili tree at this location, which is how the area reportedly got its name. There is a shrine dedicated to Shiva-Parvati.

=== Azhutha ===
Azhutha, a tributary of Pamba River is just 2 kilometres (1.2 mi) from Kalaketty. In Sanskrit, Azhutha is termed as Alamba. Pilgrims have facilities to take rest here. The Kalaketti Siva temple, is an ancient shrine located here and is administered by the Mala Araya community, who has also the administrative controls of Kalaketty, Inchippara and Mukkuzhy temples. The far river side is known as the "Azhutha medu" which is a steep slope.

The pilgrims take a dip from the river and pick up a pebble.

=== Kallidamkunnu ===
The steep Azhutha medu ends at the summit Kallidamkunnu. As part of the customs, the devotees take a pebble from Azhutha river which they drop at Kallidamkunnu to cover the remains of Mahishi. It is believed that Mahishi’s mortal remains were discarded here and subsequently covered with stones. It is also interpretated that the pebbles as representing the pilgrims’ past sins, which they leave behind at this site. Devotees also burns a camphor here before their journey.

=== Inchipparakotta ===
This is the site where Karuppa Swami’s, lieutenants of Ayyapan and Udayan’s bands of thieves clashed in battle. It is also where Puthusseri Mundan, an aide of Udayan, was slain by Lord Ayyappa’s army.

The place got its name due to the presence of a fort built by Udaya. There is a temple here named Kottayil Sastha temple, dedicated to the Inchippara moopan, the guardian of the sacred forests.

=== Mukkuzhy ===
Mukkuzhy is situated at a valley. It is the place where Ayyappan and his army rested. There are 2 temples her- one dedicated to Shastha and another to Bhagavathi. The temple dedicated to Bhagavathi is administrated by the 'Malayaraya Mahasabha'. Devotees who are tired and unable to continue trekking can and should get help here. It is near to Kuzhimavu bus stand in Koruthodu Panchayat and connected by a concrete road. From Kuzhimavu, buses and taxis are available to Pamba/Sabarimala. Frequent buses are available from Kuzhimavu to Mundakayam.

=== Karimala ===
Upon leaving Mukkuzhy, pilgrims must cross the Kariyilamthodu stream before beginning the steep ascent of Karimala. Karimala (Black Hill / Elephant Hill ('Kari': elephant in Malayalam)) is a hazardous point on the trail which is inhabited by many elephants. Pilgrims will have to cross eight levels in Karimala hill to reach its summit. Here, devotees often lights fire to escape from the wild animals and cold. There is a Nazhikkinar (well within a well) here known for its fresh water. They pray at the temple there and offer their prayers to Karimalanathan (the protector of Karimala), Karimala Bhagavathy (at the summit) and Kochu Kadutha for a risk-free journey.

Near to the temple is the tomb of Karimala Arayan, who is believed to be the first priest of Sabarimala temple. He is also believed to be the person who put foundation stone for the Sabarimala temple.

=== Valiyanavattom & Cheriyanavattom ===
The steep Karimala hill ends at Valiyanavattom which is the abode of wild elephants. This spot offers good facilities, allowing devotees to rest and relax before resuming their trek. The next halt on the journey is Cheriyaanavattom, located along the banks of the Pamba river.

== Important stops from Pamba to Main temple ==
=== Pamba River & Triveni ===
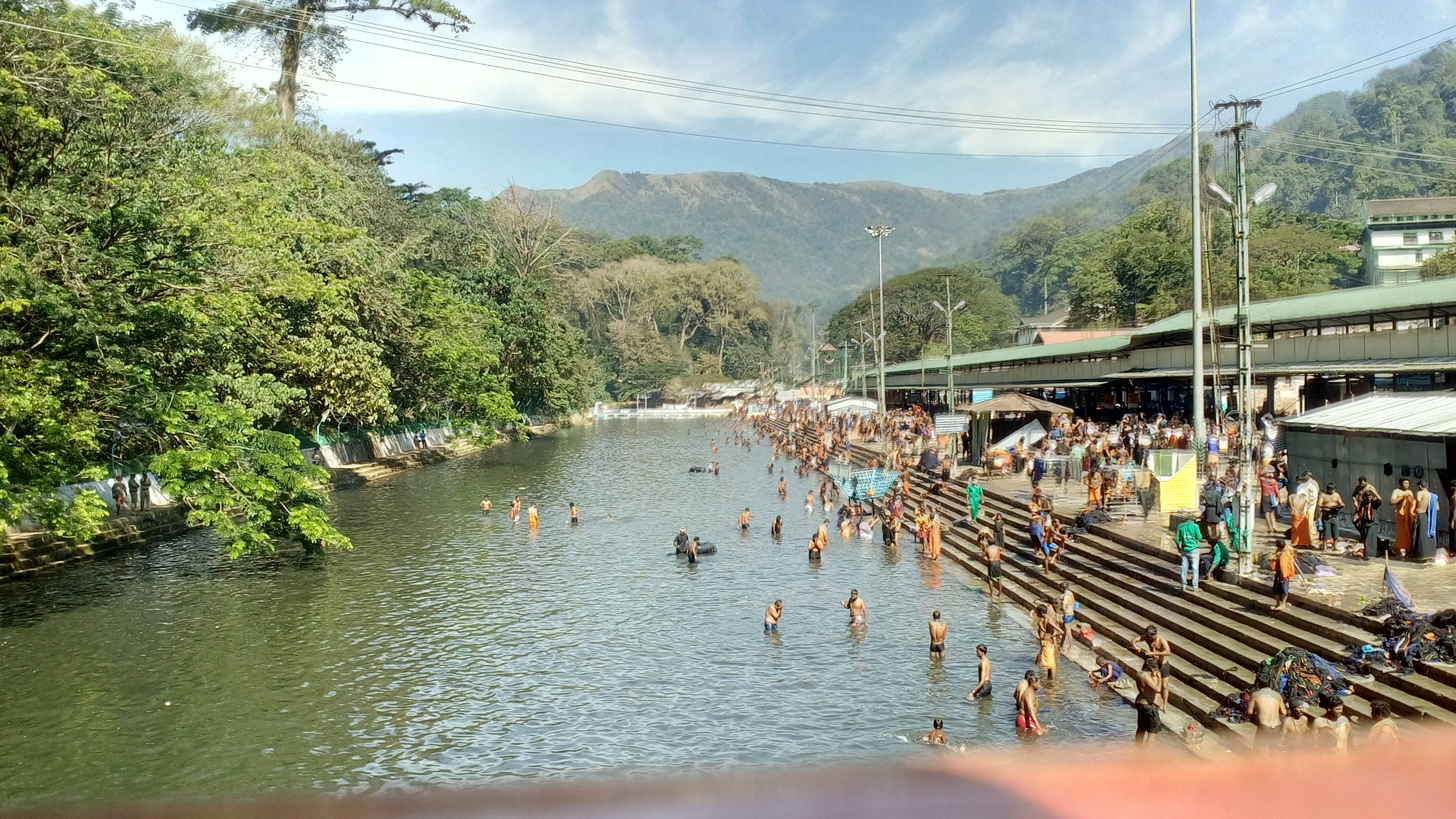
Devotees taking ritual dip at Pamba river

The Pamba River is one of the most important stop in the Sabarimala pilgrimage. It is believed that as the river flows along the foothills of the Neelimala, it bows at the feet of Lord Ayyappa. A ritual bath in its sacred waters is considered essential before beginning the arduous trek to the shrine, as devotees believe the river washes away sins accumulated over this and previous births and grants salvation. At Triveni, where the Pamba meets the Kallar and Njunungar rivers, the confluence is believed to further sanctify its waters. After that devotees pray at Pamba Ganapathy temple and break coconut there to avoid any obstacle on the upcoming trekking spots. Then the pilgrims pray at a shrine dedicated to the Pandalam king who was the father of Ayyappa.

According to tradition, the offering rituals performed in the Pamba reenact the last rites conducted by Lord Ayyappa for the warriors who laid down their lives fighting the Marava army at Triveni. Another widely held belief recounts that the King of Pandalam, Rajasekhara, discovered the abandoned infant Manikandan—later known as Lord Ayyappa—on the banks of the Pamba.

=== Neelimala ===
The hill is named after Neeli, a servant of Sage Mathanga. She was an ardent Rama devotee.

=== Appachimedu ===
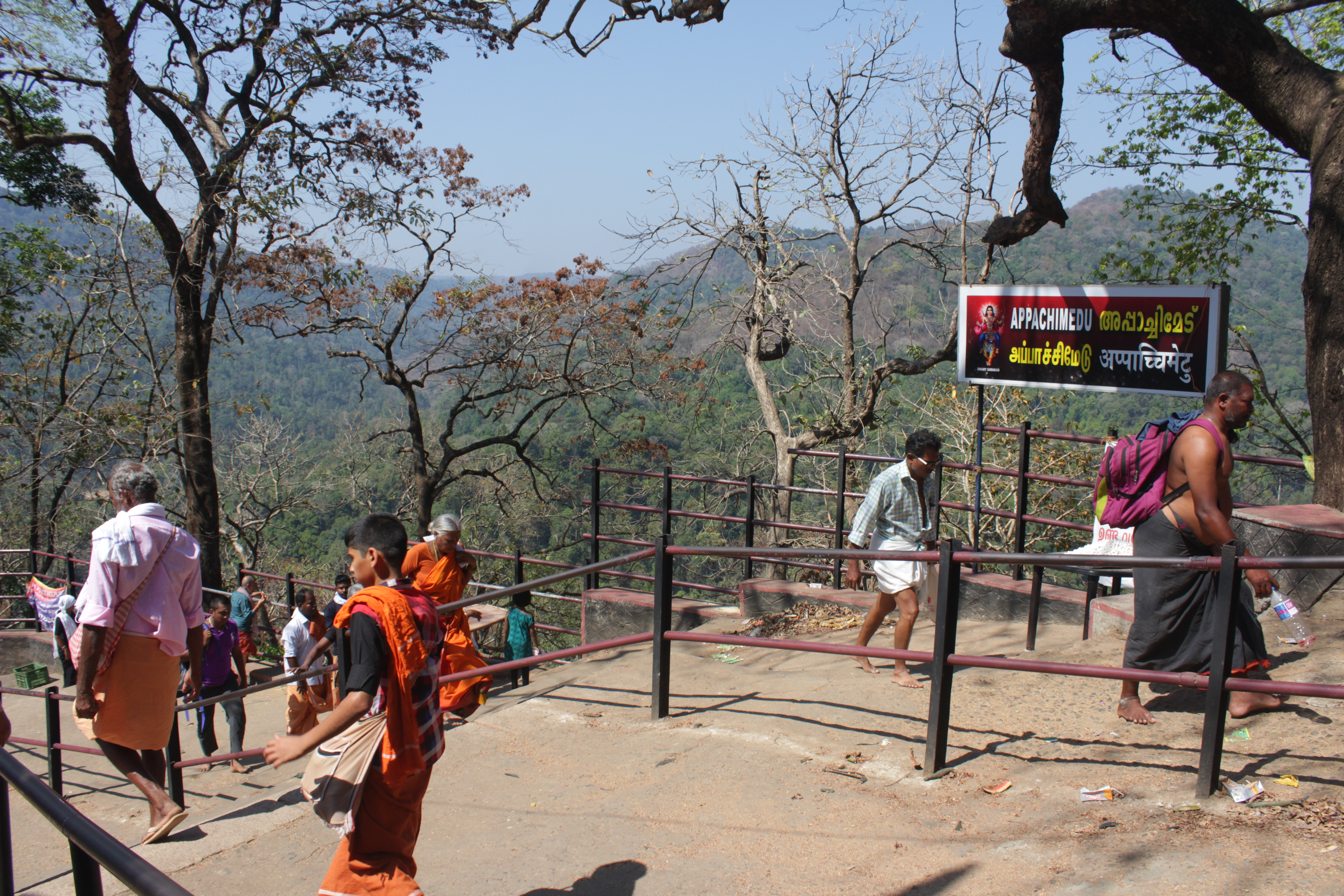
Appachimedu

After the arduous ascent of Neelimala, devotees arrive at Appachimedu. It is believed that Kaduravan, who is considered as a devoted follower or an aide of Lord Ayyappa, guards this region by keeping evil spirits at bay and ensuring the safety of pilgrims. Flanked by deep gorges on either side—known as Appachi and Epaachi—devotees throw rice balls into these gorges to appease bhoothaganangal, the spirits believed to dwell there.

=== Sabaripeedam ===
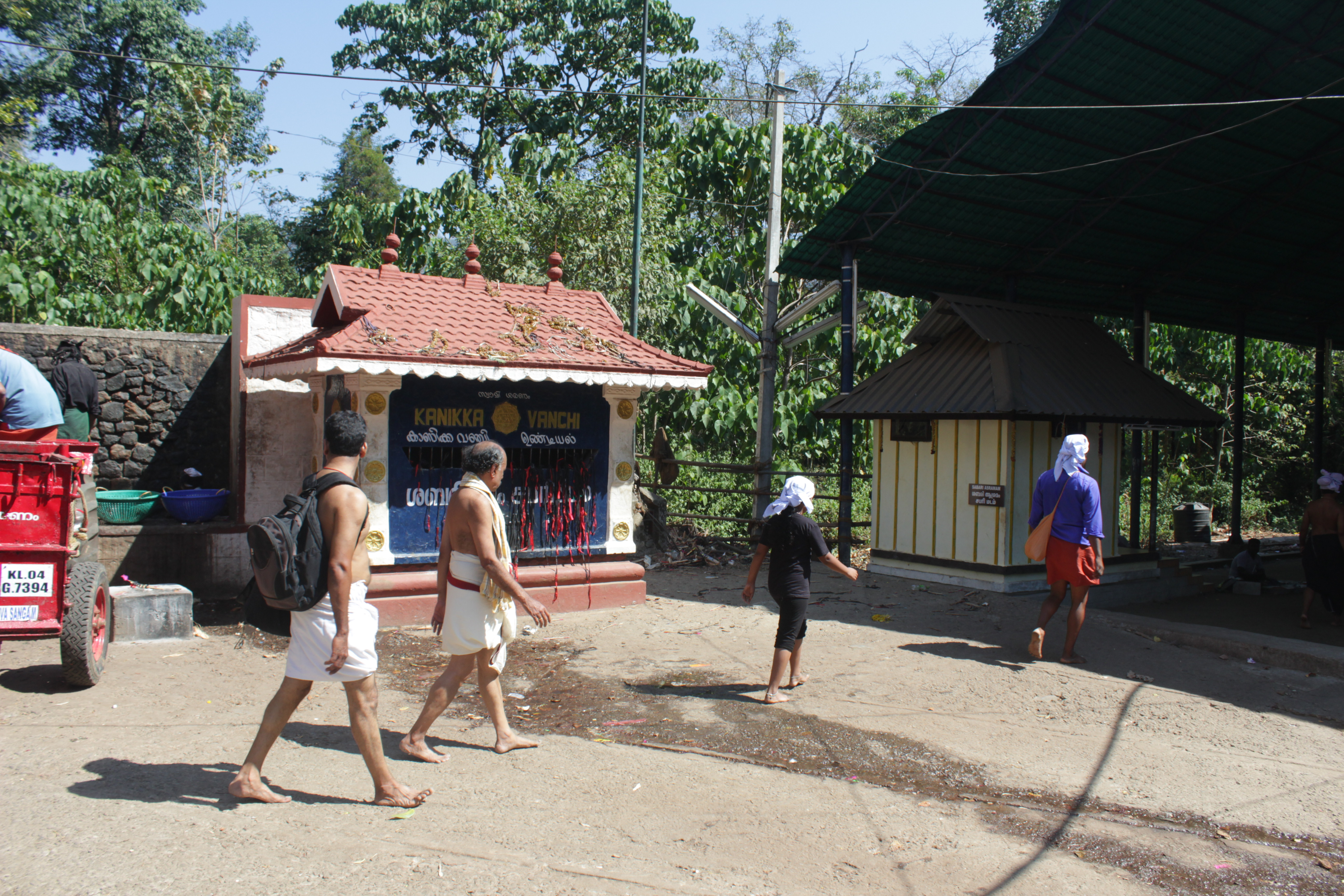
Sabaripeedam, place where Sabari got salvation from Lord Rama

Sabari Peedam is the spot on the Sabarimala trek where Lord Rama granted moksha (liberation) to the ascetic devotee Shabari, making it an important place of reverence for pilgrims before they continue their journey.

=== Saramkuthi ===
It is believed that Lord Ayyappa and his forces discarded their weapons at this spot after defeating the army led by the bandit Udayanan. Even today, first-time pilgrims arriving from Erumeli symbolically abandon the ritual arrows they carry here before proceeding to Sannidhanam, the main shrine. Another belief associated with Malikapurathamma is Ayyappa’s promise to marry her only when no first-time pilgrim(Kanni Ayyappan) undertakes the Sabarimala pilgrimage. The multitude of arrows left behind at Saramkuthi symbolizes her eternal wait. From there, the flat path leads to the Sabarimala Main temple complex.
