= Muhamma =

- Town
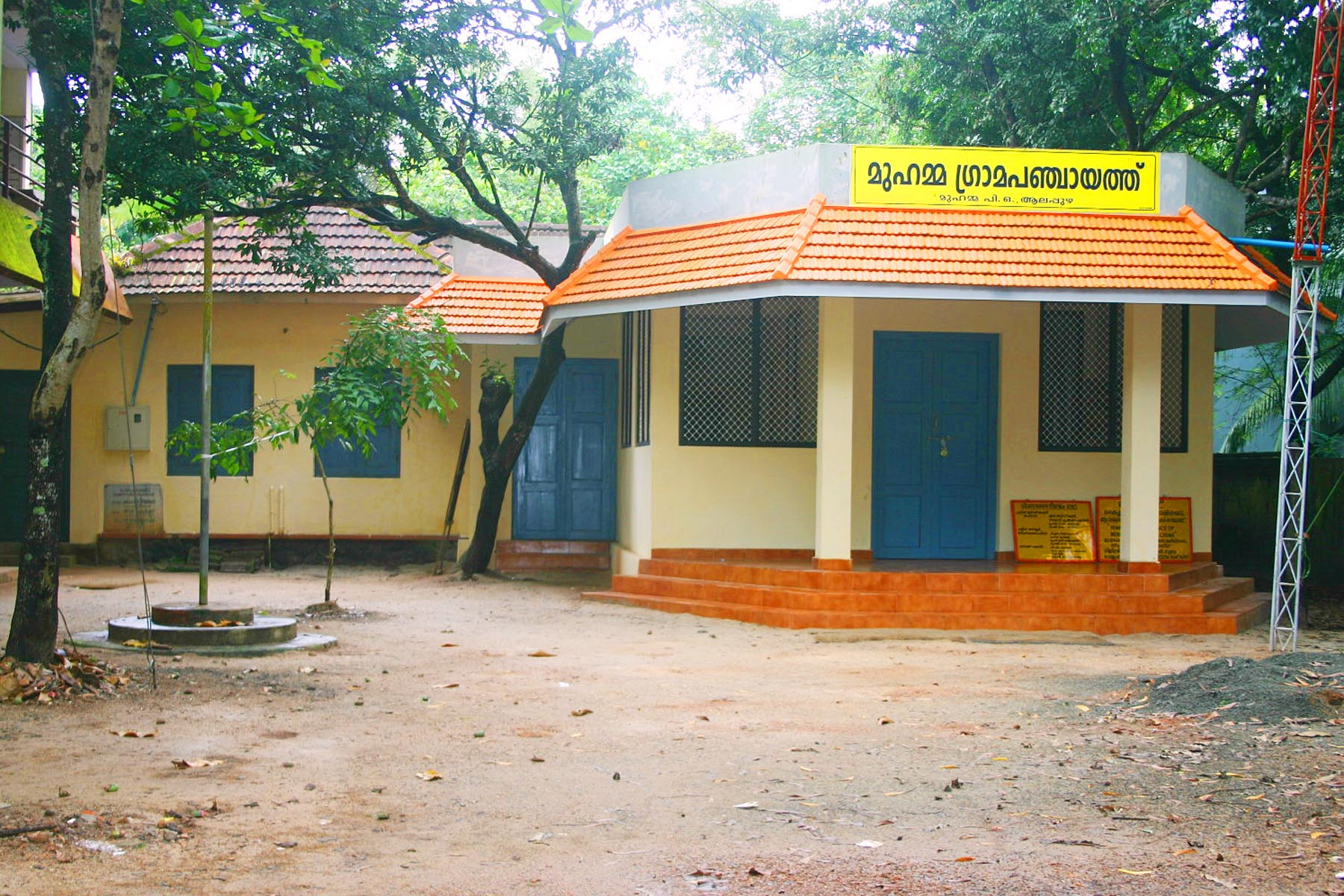
- Muhamma Panchayaath Office

- Location in Kerala, India
- Coordinates: 9°35′0″N 76°21′0″E
- Country: India
- State: Kerala
- District: Alappuzha

Government
  - Type: Panchayath
  - Body: Muhamma grama panchayath

Population (2001)
  - Total: 24,513

Languages
  - Official: Malayalam, English
- Time zone: UTC+5:30 (IST)
- PIN: 688525
- Vehicle registration: KL-04, KL-32
- Lok Sabha constituency: Alappuzha
- Vidhan Sabha constituency: Cherthala

Muhamma is a census town in the Cherthala Taluk in the Alappuzha district in the Indian state of Kerala. It is home to Cheerappanchira kalari, where Lord Ayyappa of Sabarimala had his training in the martial arts. Cheerappanchira is an Ezhava ancestral home in Muhamma. Muhamma was the village where the Communist Party of India leader P. Krishna Pillai died after sustaining a snake-bite.

== Demographics ==
As of 2001 India census, Muhamma had a population of 24,518. Males constitute 48% of the population and females 52%. Muhamma has an average literacy rate of 85%, higher than the national average of 59.5%: male literacy is 88%, and female literacy is 83%. In Muhamma, 10% of the population is under 6 years of age.

Year	Male	Female	Total Population	Change	Religion (%)							
Year	Male	Female	Total Population	Change	Hindu	Muslim	Christian	Sikhs	Buddhist	Jain	Other religions and persuasions	Religion not stated
2001	11830	12688	24518	-	89.11	4.06	6.82	0.00	0.00	0.00	0.00	0.00
2011	12553	13308	25861	5.48%	89.03	3.87	6.73	0.00	0.00	0.00	0.01	0.36

== Geography ==
Muhamma is a small village in Alappuzha. Pathiramanal is a small island and tourist attraction in Muhamma. Kanjikkuzhi (S.L.Puram), Mannanchery and Thanneermukkom are neighbouring villages of Muhamma. The east side of the Muhamma is the Vembanad backwater, which borders Kottayam district. The other side of the backwater is Kumarakam. Muhamma-Kumarakam is the widest part of the Vembanad backwater. A distance of about 8 km can be travelled by boat (state water service is available) in 40 minutes.

== Transport ==
Government ferry is available to Kumarakom, Cheepunkal and Maniaparampu

Ferry Services from Muhamma
Destination	Departure	Route	Comments
Kumarakom	5:45, 6:30, 7:15, 8:15, 9:00, 10:00, 11:00, 11:45, 13:00, 13:45, 14:45, 15:30, 16:30, 17:15, 18:15, 19:00	Across Vempanad Lake	2 wheelers can be carried Disclaimer: Depend on operating conditions
Maniaparambu	11:00	Cheepunkal[11:30]	
Pathiramanal Island	Special(on-Demand)		Tourists can book special boat Contact Muhamma Station:9400050331
