= Sree Bhoothanaathopakhyaanam =

First printed work about Ayyappa

Sree Bhoothanaathopakhyaanam (Malayalam: ശ്രീ ഭൂതനാഥോപാഖ്യാനം) was the first work to be printed about Ayyappa, in any language.

Published in 1929, this Malayalam Kilippaattu brought the story of Ayyappa to popular attention for the first time in literature. It is from this work that the traditions about the Sabarimala pilgrimage came to be followed.

The author Kallaraykkal Krishnan Kartha died around the late 1930s and the book was not available in print after 1947.

The Ayyappa Documentation Project of the Sabari Sharanasramam Trust followed the book up and managed to obtain a copy of the 1947 edition. The book is now reprinted for the first time after 1947.

The status of Sreemath Sree Bhoothanaathopakhyaanam Kilippaattu as far as religion and spirituality are concerned, is the same as that of the Ramayanam and Bhaagavatham Kilippaatu by Ezhuthacchan. Those works brought Sriram and Srikrishna to the popular mind in Kerala. Sreemath Sree Bhoothanaathopakhyaanam did so about Kerala's own indigenous deity, the Ayyappaswami.

In his foreword to the new print edition, Sri. Kummanam Rajasekharan has exhorted devotees to use the book for daily reading in temples and at home. He has also asked that the holy Vrischikam month be observed henceforth as Sree Bhoothanaatha Maasam.
