= Ponnambalamedu =

Indian mountain summit

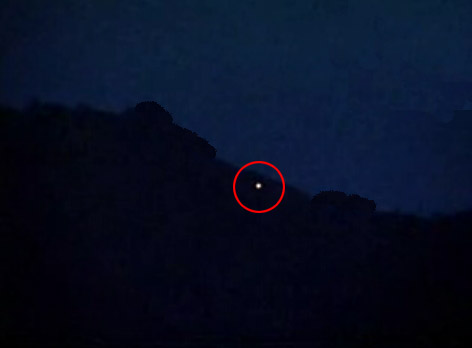
Makaravilakku (Holy flame) shown lit atop Ponnambalamedu

Ponnambalamedu is where the fire lit event of Makaravilakku is conducted by the Travancore Devaswom Board annually in the presence of nearly half a million pilgrims annually. It is a summit in the Western Ghat mountain ranges of Pathanamthitta District, Perunad grama panchayat, Kerala, India. It is located near the Sabarimala Ayyappan temple.

Raman Nair, who headed the Devaswom Board under the Congress government said “It’s the police and officials of the Travancore Devaswom Board who would jointly light the fire at Ponnambalamedu on the orders of the state government.”

== Etymology ==
Ponnambalamedu is derived from the Malayalam words Pon (gold), Ambalam (temple) and Medu (hill). The compound word is meant to refer to the hill of the golden temple.

== Location ==
Ponnambalamedu is located at a distance of 4 kilometres (2.5 mi) from the Sabarimala Ayyappan temple. The summit of the hill is at an altitude of 1,170 metres (3,840 ft) from mean sea level. The hill is in the Goodrickal range of the Ranni Forest Division and has been included as a part of the Periyar National Park, a tiger reserve. Ponnambalamedu has been characterized as an ecologically sensitive area by forest officials in the region and has been identified as a critical habitat for tigers. The hill is also near the Kochupamba Power Substation, owned and operated by the Kerala State Electricity Board. The substation supplies electricity to the Sabarimala temple. Access to the peak of Ponnambalamedu is through an unpaved forest road controlled by local forest department authorities.

== History ==
Historically, the summit of the hill was a place of worship for the local tribal population. The rituals of these tribes, most notably the lighting of Makaravilakku, were taken over by the Travancore Devasvom Board following higher number of pilgrims visiting Sabarimala. There are also reports stating that there was an Ayyappan temple at the summit of the hill which was maintained by local tribes. It was reported that these tribal people began the ritual of Makaravilakku by lighting large quantities of camphor and wood, and subsequently quenching the flame using a wet blanket three times at the time of the annual festival. After the takeover by the Devasvom Board, a platform for lighting the flame was constructed in the place of the temple.

Today the annual festival is held at the Ayyappan temple in Sabarimala in the month of January. A holy flame is lit at Ponnambalamedu to commemorate the religious event. The event of Makaravilakku at Ponnambalamedu is witnessed by nearly half a million people each year.

== Makaravilakku ==
Makaravilakku is the ceremonial lighting of a “holy flame” atop Ponnambalamedu during the annual festival at Sabarimala. This event marks the culmination of the pilgrimage season, which lasts for about two months. The flame is lit in synchrony with the Deeparathana ritual at the Sabarimala temple, symbolizing the conclusion of the festival. The flame is lit using camphor at the summit. Makaravilakku, which was thought to be a miraculous event by most visiting pilgrims, was later proven to be a "make-believe" hoax, being lit by members of the Travancore Devasvom Board and local police, which eventually led to the deaths of many pilgrims in a crowd crush.
