= Mahishi (demoness) =

She-buffalo demoness in Hinduism

- Affiliation: Asura

Genealogy
- Parents: Rambha (father)
- Siblings: Mahishasura

In Hindu mythology, Mahishi is a powerful demoness whose narrative is central to the origin of Lord Ayyappa and the traditions of the Sabarimala temple. She was the sister of the buffalo-demon Mahishasura.

== Mythology and Origins ==
According to the Sree Bhoothanaathopakhyaanam , Mahishi was the reincarnation of Leela, the wife of the sage Dattatreya. Following a divine dispute and a subsequent curse, Leela was reborn as a she-buffalo. Seeking to avenge her brother Mahishasura — who was slain by the goddess Durga —Mahishi performed rigorous penance to appease Brahma.

From Brahma, she secured a specific boon: that she could only be slain by a child born of the union of Lord Shiva and Lord Vishnu. Believing such a birth to be biologically impossible, she unleashed a reign of terror, conquering the Svarga and ousting Indra from his throne.

To counter Mahishi's invincibility, the deities sought a solution. Following the Samudra Manthana , Shiva was captivated by the beauty of Mohini, the female avatar of Vishnu. Their union led to the birth of Ayyappan (also known as Manikandan or Dharma Sastha), the divine child born of two male deities, thereby fulfilling the technical requirements of Mahishi’s boon.

When Mahishi attempted to storm heaven once more, Ayyappan, then a young prince, ascended to the celestial realms. He engaged the demoness in a fierce battle, eventually catching her by her horns and hurling her down to Earth. She landed on the banks of the Azhuthayar River near Sabarimala, where Ayyappan performed a divine dance on her body as she died.

As she drew her final breath, the curse was lifted, and Leela was released from her demonic form. Legend states she requested to marry Ayyappan, however, as he was an eternal celibate, he declined. Instead, he granted her a place of worship at his shrine, where she is venerated as Maalikapurathamma.
