= Makaravilakku =

Indian holy festival

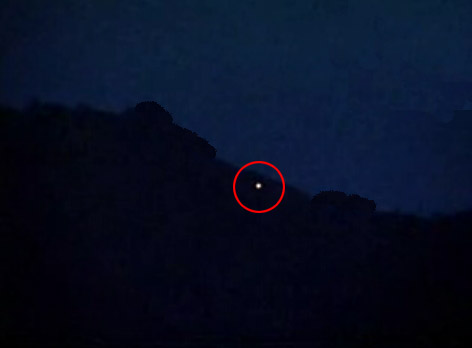
Makaravilaku appears in Ponnambalamedu

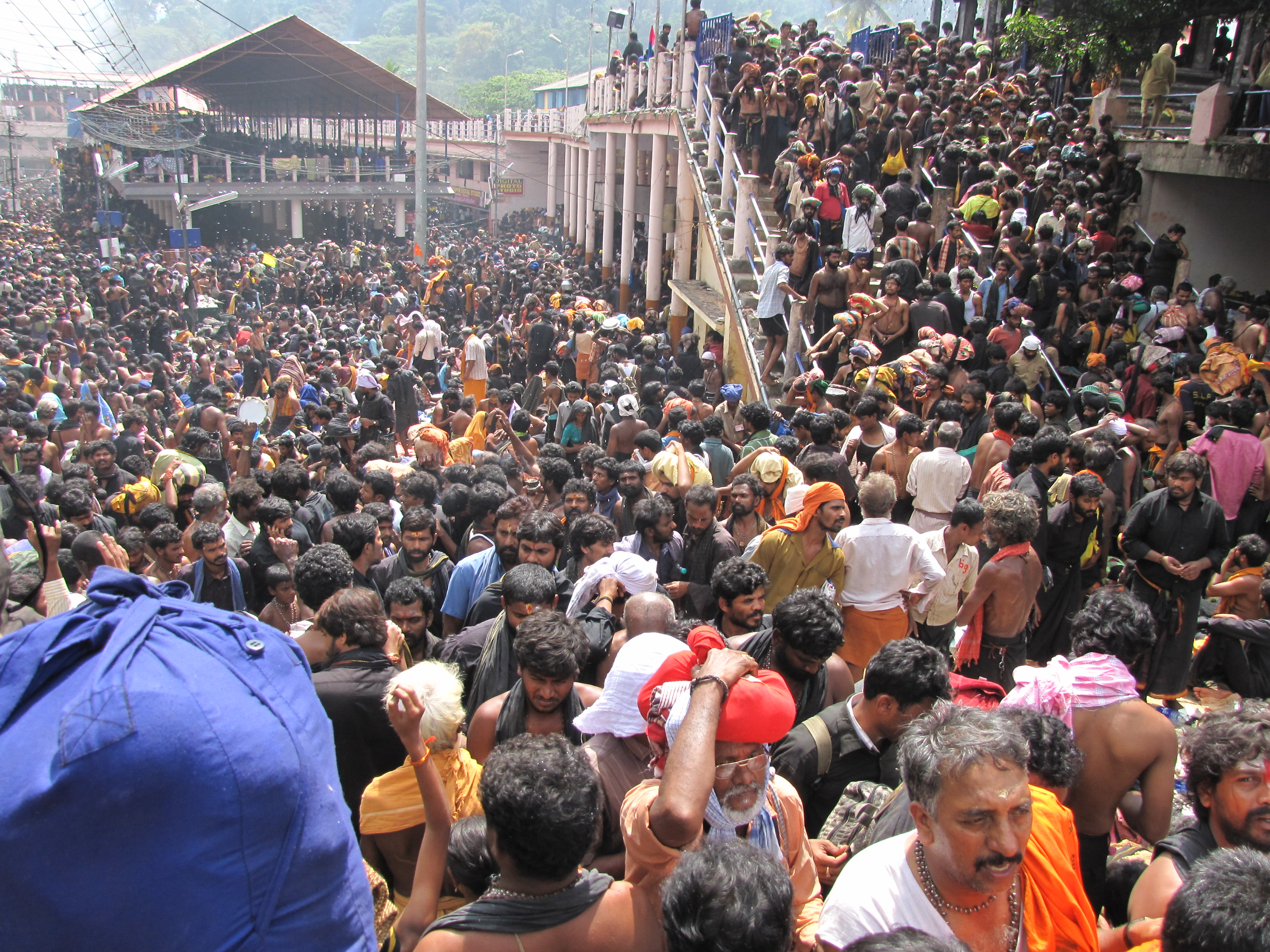
Devotees gather at Sabrimala sannidhanam to get glimpse of Makara Jyothi.

Makaravilakku is a mystic deepam (Fire glow) on the Makara Jyothi day that can be seen at ponnambalamedu. It can be seen from Sabarimala beneath the celestial star Sirius. Ponnambalamedu is at a height of 1170m and sabarimala is at a height of 1,260m above mean sea level. The festival includes the Thiruvabharanam (sacred ornaments of the deity Ayyappan) procession and a congregation at the hill shrine of Sabarimala. An estimated half a million devotees flow to Sabarimala every year to view the fire.

Raman Nair, who headed the Devaswom Board under the Congress government said “It’s the police and officials of the Travancore Devaswom Board who would jointly light the fire at Ponnambalamedu on the orders of the state government”

This lighting of the flame at the summit of the hill marks the finale of the pilgrimage season at Sabarimala which lasts about two months. This flame is lit at the time of Deeparathana at the Sabarimala temple. The flame is lit using camphor at the summit.

== Makaravilakku organisers ==
Makaravilakku is a part of a religious ritual that was practiced since the past by the Malayaraya tribe who are believed to be the descendants of Malayaman Kaari in the forest of Ponnambalamedu (the place where Makaravilakku appears) and then later secretly continued by The Travancore Devaswom Board (TDB). It has been practiced for more than hundreds of years by the tribes and no supernatural elements are associated with it.

The name refers to the lighting of a bright "vilakku" (lamp) three times atop Ponnambalamedu.
