= Swami Ayyappan (TV series) =

- Genre: Drama; Devotional
- Directed by: Season 1: Suresh Unnithan; Season 2, 3: Thulasidas; Season 4: Kannan Thamarakkulam; Season 5: Sudheesh Sankar Vinod Bhagavathinada
- Starring: Kaushik Babu; Devan; Aishwariyaa Bhaskaran; Sukanya; Lakshmi Gopalaswamy; Rajan P. Dev; Nandu; K. R. Vijaya
- Opening theme: Sabarimaamala Vaazhumayyappa
- Ending theme: Harivaraasanam
- Composers: Sanandh George; Udayakumar Anjal
- Country of origin: India
- Original language: Malayalam
- No. of seasons: 5

Production
- Producers: Murugan, Karthikeyan
- Production company: Merryland Studio

Original release
- Network: Asianet
- Release: 20 November 2006 – 22 February 2025

Swami Ayyappan is an Indian soap opera that debuted on Asianet channel. The show was produced by Merryland Studio and completed five seasons. It is one of the top-rated series in Indian television. The first and second seasons was dubbed into Tamil as Swami Ayyapan and Swamiye Saranam Ayyappa for Vijay TV, first and fourth season in Telugu as Swamiye Saranam Ayyappa for Star Maa and fifth season in Kannada as Malikappuram on Star Suvarna.

== Production ==
Producer Karthikeyan spotted Kaushik Babu in a magazine and invited him to the studio. After getting into a costume and makeup, Kaushik strongly resembled a painting of Swami Ayyappan and was signed for the show's leading role. Although Kaushik was a child actor in the Telugu film industry, this was his television debut. Later Devan, Aishwariyaa Bhaskaran, Sukanya, Lakshmi Gopalaswamy, Rajan P. Dev, and Nandu were signed for other lead roles, along with other prominent actors from the Malayalam film and television industries.

== Seasons ==
In 2010, Merryland Studio aired Swami Ayyappan Saranam, a continuation of the series that portrayed additional experiences of Swami Ayyappan. Devan and Kaushik Babu reprised their roles, along with Meenakumari and several Malayali artists.

The third season, Sabarimala Shri Dharmashasta, aired on Asianet in 2012 and continued the story of Ayyappa Bhaktha's (Devotees of Ayyappa). This season featured Kaushik Babu's return to the Malayalam television industry, performing with actors K. R. Vijaya, T. S. Raju, Praveena, Maya Vishwanath, Harsha Nair, Indulekha, and Baby Nayana in the other lead roles.

The fourth season, Sabarimala Swami Ayyappan, aired on Asianet in 2019. It was a remake of season one with a different format. This season is noted for the debut of Kaushik Babuas an adult actor in Malayalam television.

The fifth season, Malikappuram: Apathbandhavan Ayyappan aired on Asianet from 6 November 2023 to 22 February 2025. The show was the story of Ayyappa's devotees. The show stars K. R. Vijaya, Baby Eithal in lead roles and child artist Aarav Umesh plays role of Lord Ayyappa.

== Cast ==
=== Season 1 - Swami Ayyappan ===
==== Main ====
- Kaushik Babu as Ayyappan / Manikandan
- Aishwariyaa Bhaskaran as Mahishi
- Rajan P. Dev as Pandalam Minister
- Devan as Pandala Rajavu (Voice-over) by Shobhi Thilakkan
- Nandu as Chakrapani
- Sukanya as Pandalam Maharani

==== Recurring ====
- Master Ajay as Manu
- Poornima Anand as Saraswathi
- Sreedevi Anil
- Anju
- Priyanka Anoop as Mayamma
- Baby Anushri as Kunjulakshmi
- Mohan Ayroor
- Fathima Babu as Unnikrishnan's mother
- Idavela Babu
- Kalasala Babu as Gurumooppan/Malamooppan
- Baiju as Kunjulakshmi's father
- Anand Bharathi as Vavaru
- Kanya Bharathi
- Sreeja Chandran as Lakshmi Devi / Seetha
- Sarath Das as Murugan
- Master Dhananjay as Young Ayyappan
- Ibrahimkutty
- Irshad
- Jayakrishnan
- Adithyan Jayan
- Keerikkadan Jose as Udayan
- Anu Joseph
- Kailaasnath as Jyotsyan
- Kanakalatha as Manu's mother
- Karthika Kannan as Sarama
- Baby Devu Krishnan as Subadra
- Master Sarath Kumar as Kannan
- Vanchiyoor Praveen Kumar as Bhatti Shastri
- Meena Kumari as Ratnavathi
- Chandra Lakshman
- K. P. A. C. Lalitha as Ratnavathi's mother
- Lavanya as Chakrapani's Sister / Chandika
- T. P. Madhavan
- Mahalakshmi
- Mahesh as Gurunathan
- Mukundan Menon as Shankaran ( Kunju Lakshmi's father)
- Shalu Menon as Parvathi Devi
- Bindu Murali as Bhasma Devi
- Harsha Nair
- Kochu Preman as Namoorishan
- Rajesh
- Poojappura Ravi
- Praveena as Kunju Lakshmi's mother
- Master Rahul as Rajarajan
- Thirumala Ramachandran
- Ramya
- Master Rashid
- Saranya Sasi as Vedavthy
- Sreekala Sasidharan
- Sathyapriya as Lakshmi (Gurumatha)
- Sidhraj
- Master Sreejit
- Jagathy Sreekumar as Velappan
- V. K. Sreeraman as Rishi
- Subbalakshmi as Vyttatti muttashi
- Sudheer as Dattatreya
- Master Sujith as Young Ayyappan
- Sajan Surya as Arjuna
- Master Ashwin Thampy as Veluthunn
- Thilakan as Mahapandithan
- Shobi Thilakan as Chandakan
- Kollam Thulasi as Karumadi Kaimal
- Ravi Vallathol as Unnikrishnan's mother
- Jagannatha Varma
- Gayathri Varsha as Dharmi
- Master Venkatesh as young Kannan
- Venuji
- Vimalraj as Vrikrasuran or Bhasmasuran
- Vishnuprasad
- Yathikumar

==== Guest ====
- Lakshmi Gopalaswamy as Mohini
- Saranya Mohan as Malikapurathamma

=== Season 2 - Swami Ayyappan Saranam ===
==== Cast ====
- Kaushik Babu
- Meghna Vincent
- Sreeja Chandran
- Devan
- Master Dhananjay
- Prajusha Gowri
- Deepa Jayan
- Anu Joseph
- Manka Mahesh
- Meenakumari
- Mukundan Menon
- Shalu Menon
- Sharika Menon
- Maya Moushmi
- Sreelatha Namboothiri
- Nandu
- Vishu Prasad
- Saranya Sasi
- Sreekala Sasidharan
- Sidharaj
- Sukumari

=== Season 3 - Sabarimala Sree Dharamashastha ===
==== Cast ====
- K.R.Vijaya as Savithri
- Anand Bharathi as Vavaru
- Praveena as Devi
- Meenakumari
- Maya Moushmi
- Harsha Nair
- Baby Nayana
- T. S.Raju
- Indulekha S
- Manju Satheesh
- Sonikha
- Maya Vishwanath as Chitra Lekha
- Saji Nair
- Yathikumar

=== Season 4 - Sabarimala Swami Ayyapan ===
==== Cast ====
- Kaushik Babu as Ayyappan
- Master Akilesh as Young Ayyappan
- Boban Alummoodan as Devendran
- Anushree (Prakrithi)
- Naveen Arakkal as Dattan
- Ambili Devi /Arathy Sojan as Lakshmi Devi
- Kala Dharan as Shukracharya
- Hareendran as Chanthu
- Hari as Chnadrakant
- Yousaf Harisree as Chakrapani
- Ibrahimkutty
- Sindhu Jacob as Gurupathni
- Adithyan Jayan as Achuthan
- Sabu Varghese as Rektha bheejan/Udayanan
- Anu Joseph as Adi Parashakthi, Mahakali, Durga
- Kezia Joseph
- Kalesh Kalakkodu
- Shamna Kasim as Mohini
- Akshara Kishore as Malli
- Anuradha Krishnamoorthy
- Master Leswin as Shankaran
- Shemi Martin as Malli's mother
- Subhash Menon as Kumaravarman
- Murali Mohan as Guru
- Aparnnaa Nair
- Leena Nair as Sabari/Malini
- Prajusha as Gouri
- Sangeetha Rajendran
- Thirumala Ramachandran as Ramanunni
- Latha Rao as Panthalam Maharani
- Kottayam Rasheed as Mahisha Maharshi
- Faisal Razi
- Indulekha S as Sumangala
- Sabarinath as Vavar
- Sreekala Sasidharan/Sonika as Parvathy Devi
- Shiju as Pandalam Rajavu
- Sonikha as Saraswati Devi
- Sreekala as Kalikutty, Shani, and Yama
- Arya Sreeram
- Sudhir Sukumaran as Udayanan
- Master Madhav M Sunil as Young Ayyappan
- Sajan Surya as Harishchandra
- Archana Suseelan as Mahishi
- Sini Varghese as Chandramati
- Sindhu Varma as Damayanthi, Manthri Patni
- Yathikumar as Vashisht

== Songs ==
The television show featured recurring and original music, including:

- "Sabarimamala Vazhum Ayyappa" (title song)
- "Harivarasanam" (closing theme)
- "Chandrakaladhara" (Song of Mohini and Bhasmasura)
- "Siva-lasya" (Song of Mohini and Siva)
- "Veeravirada" (Pandhalam celebration song)
- "Padhakam Malam Thozhunne Murari" (devotional song)
- "Mannilum Vinnilum" (Song at Gurukulam) from Swami Ayyappan (1975 film)
- "Harinarayana Jayanarayana" (sung by Maharshi Naradar), from Swami Ayyappan (1975 film)
- "Eshwaran Illathoru Idavumilaa" (Song at Gurukulam)

== See also ==
- Swami Ayyappan (1975 film)
