= Sree Ayyappanum Vavarum =

- Directed by: N. P. Suresh
- Screenplay by: Purushan Alappuzha; Alappuzha Karthikeyan
- Story by: Purushan Alappuzha
- Produced by: Uma Thankam
- Starring: Prem Nazir; Srividya; M. G. Soman; Nalini
- Cinematography: P. N. Sundaram
- Edited by: N. P. Suresh
- Music by: A. T. Ummer
- Production company: Sreedevi Movies
- Release date: 28 October 1982
- Country: India
- Language: Malayalam

Sree Ayyappanum Vavarum (transl. Sree Ayyappan and Vavar) is a 1982 Indian Malayalam-language Hindu mythological film directed and edited by N. P. Suresh and written by Purushan Alappuzha and Alappuzha Karthikeyan from a story by Purushan. The film stars Prem Nazir, Srividya, M. G. Soman and Nalini. The music for the film was composed by A. T. Ummer.

== Cast ==
- S. Babu as Lord Ayyappan
- Prem Nazir as Vavar
- Srividya as Vavar's wife
- M. G. Soman as King of Pandhalam
- Nalini
- Swapna as Bhavanai
- Mohanlal as Kadutha (cameo)
- Cochin Haneefa as Kaliyappan
- Prathapachandran
- Unnimary as Queen of Pandhalam
- Rajkumar
- Balan K. Nair as King Udayanan
- Rajasenan as Lord Indran
- Kaduvakulam Antony as Ummer
- Mala Aravindan
- Meena

== Production ==
The film was shot at Vijaya Vauhini Studios, Prasad Studios and Chitra Mahal Studios, some of the scenes were shot in the hills of Sabarimala.

== Soundtrack ==
The music was composed by A. T. Ummer and the lyrics were written by Poovachal Khader and Koorkkancheri Sugathan.

No.	Song	Singers	Lyrics
1	"Amme Naarayana"	K. J. Yesudas	
2	"Dharma Saasthaave"	K. J. Yesudas	Poovachal Khader
3	"Dhyaaye Chaaru"	K. J. Yesudas	
4	"Dhyaaye Kodi"	K. J. Yesudas	
5	"Dhyaayedananda"	K. J. Yesudas	
6	"Eeshwara Jagadeeshwara"	K. J. Yesudas	Poovachal Khader
7	"Ezhazhake Noorazhake"	Ambili, Chorus	Poovachal Khader
8	"Naagendra Haaraaya"	K. J. Yesudas	
9	"Naagendra Haaraaya" (Slow)	K. J. Yesudas	
10	"Nilaavenna Pole"	S. Janaki	Poovachal Khader
11	"Om Bhoothanatha"	K. J. Yesudas	
12	"Om Namasthe"	K. J. Yesudas	
13	"Shabarigireeshaa"	K. J. Yesudas	Poovachal Khader
14	"Sharanam Viliyude"	K. J. Yesudas	Koorkkancheri Sugathan
15	"Thathraagathaashwa"	K. J. Yesudas	
