= Malikappuram: Apathbandhavan Ayyappan =

Indian Television series

- Also known as: Malikappuram
- Genre: Drama; Mythology
- Created by: Merryland Studio
- Written by: Sugathan Kannur
- Directed by: Sudheesh Sankar (2023); Vinod Bhagavathinada (2023-2025)
- Creative director: S. Murugan
- Starring: K. R. Vijaya
- Theme music composer: "Thedi varum Kannulalil" by G. Devarajan
- Country of origin: India
- Original language: Malayalam
- No. of seasons: 1
- No. of episodes: 383

Production
- Executive producers: Suja Murugan, Saranya Subramaniam
- Producer: S. Murugan
- Production location: Trivandrum
- Cinematography: Shijinjith
- Editor: Machado Joseph Kavanad
- Running time: 20-22 minutes
- Production company: Sree Saran Creation

Original release
- Network: Asianet
- Release: 6 November 2023 – 22 February 2025

Related
- Swami Ayyappan

Malikappuram: Apathbandhavan Ayyappan (transl. Ayyappan Who Helps During Troublesome Times) is an Indian devotional television series that aired on Asianet from 6 November 2023 to 22 February 2025 and streams on JioHotstar in India. The series revolves around the relationship between Muthassi, a devout grandmother, and her granddaughter Unnimol, both devotees of Ayyappan and desires to visit Sabarimala Temple. South Indian actress K. R. Vijaya and child artist Eithal play the lead roles This series is the fifth season of Swami Ayyappan franchise. The show was also dubbed into Kannada as Malikappuram on Star Suvarna from 4 March 2024 to 11 May 2024.

== Plot ==
When Meenakshi (Unnimol) was born, her mother died in delivery. Her father left the place after few days. She is considered as a bad omen by her relatives and villagers except her grandmother because of an astrological prediction. When she is grown up she had to face a lot of sufferings but only hope for her life was trust on Lord Ayyappa. In this time, Lord Ayyappa and Vavar came to her life as Giridevan and Vava to help her and they became close friends. After some days, following so many circumstances she met her father Vinod and he came back to their home. He was staying at Anasuya's home for these years as he lost his memory. Anasuya is a traditional doctor who has a daughter Thara, who has been locked in her home with ritual threads protecting her from Mrithyu Devatha as Thara's father died due to a curse from snake lords as he tried to capture a precious stone of Snake Lords. Later Vinod and Anasuya got married. Unnimol and Thara are living like siblings. Giridevan and Vava are trying to help Unnimol from problems creating by her relatives and Thara from Mruthyu Devatha. To solve threat from Mruthyu Devatha completely they find a solution that a devotioned coconut should be reached Sabarimala temple. Unnimol and Thara began Pilgrimage to Sabarimala. Mruthyu Devatha tried many ways for stopping them but Giridevan, Vava along with Lambu (Lord Ganesha) protected them. Finally Thara reached Sabarimala with coconut and her curse is completely cured. But Unnimol can't go to temple. On their way back, they visited a temple where the idol is turned backward. When they enquired, they came to knew about story of a mother. She stolen some rice and vegetables from Temple to feed her child. But village chief caught her and publicly punished. She committed suicide and her son ran away from the village.This made goddess in the temple angry and village chief got paralyzed and idol began facing backward. Some astrologers suggested that if the lady's son come to temple the goddess will turns front. Unnimol with help of Giridevan, Vava and Lambu found the son and visited the temple making goddess happy.In these times, Anupama stolen Vaidooryanagam and got arrested by Police. But Giridevan saved her by stating that a hidden criminal is behind the crime. She dug a hole and placed it in but after some rounds of handchangings it is in hands of a group of children. After some challenges Unnimol got the Vaidooryanagam back. After this Unnimol, Giridevan and Vava solved problems of Paaru and Anu. Paaru is sad due to her father's alcoholism, Anu loves a rich man's boy and struggles for finding dowry. After this, they met Thamburu, she can't speak for almost a year due to Brahmarakshas, a spirit. They also solved the issue.

== Cast ==
=== Main ===
- K. R. Vijaya as Devakiyamma, devotee of Ayyappa, Mother of Vinod, Rajeevan and Jayan, mother-in-law of Anasuya, Mini and Anupama.
- Baby Eithal Evana Sherin as Unnimol, Devaki's granddaughter, Vinod's daughter, Anasuya's strp-daughter
- Aarav Umesh as Giridevan (Lord Ayyappa)
- Sreedev Pradeep as Vava (Vavar)
- Lal Krish as Vinod, Meenakshi's father, Tara's step-father, Devakiyamma's son, Anasuya's second husband

=== Supporting ===
- Akhina Shibu as Anasuya, Tara's mother, Meenakshi's step- mother, Devakiyamma's daughter in law, Vinod's second wife
- Renjith Menon as Rajeevan, Anupama's husband, Devakiyamma's son
- Amrutha Varnan as Anupama, Rajeevan's wife,
- Rahul R as Jayan, Mini's husband Devakiyamma's son
- Arya Sreeram as Mini, Jayan's wife
- Sharu as Malini teacher
- Abhaidev Raveendran as Abhijit
- Akshitha as Tara, Anasuya's daughter, Vinod's step-daughter
- Ananditha Manu as Hima
- Archana Devi as Radha teacher
- Lekshmy Nandan as Mrityu Devatha
- Vishnu K Vijayan as Ananthan
- Rihan as Lambu (Lord Ganesha)
- Aishwarya Devi as Devi
- _____ as Dhanwantari
- Fazal Razi as Mahesh
- Mithun MK as Anurag
- Gomati priya as Anu
- Sarath Das as Raghu
- Vaiga as Thamburu
- Niya Renjith
- Ashbin as Jayanthan
- Kavitha Lakshmi as Bhamini, Jayanthan's mother
- Leena Nair(Dual Role) as
  - Leela, Jeevan's mother
  - Sabari (Archived from Sabarimala Swami Ayyappan)
- Saritha Balakrishnan as Sathi
- Archana Suseelan as Mahishi (Archived from Sabarimala Swami Ayyappan)
- Swasika as Mohini
- ___as Krishna
- Akash Mahesh as Vamanan
- Anu Joseph as Yakshiamma
- Ronson Vincent as Narasimham
- Shobi Thilakan as Yamadevan
- Arun G Raghavan as Parashuraman
- Mohammad Rafi
- Sajin John
- Meenakshi

== Production ==
=== Casting ===
It is produced by S. Murugan under the banner of SreeSaran Creations after the success of Padatha Painkili. K. R. Vijaya is making her television comeback with this series. Baby Eithal Evana Sherin is making her television debut along with debutantes Aarav and Sreedev.

=== Music ===
Title tracks are adapted from Merryland's production Swami Ayyappan and the Sabarimala Swami Ayyappan TV series except Thedi Thedi.

No.	Title	Lyrics	Singers(s)	Length
1.	"Harivaraasanam"	Vayalar Ramavarma	K. J. Yesudas
2.	"Thedivarum Kannukalil"	Kannadasan	Ambili
3.	"Harihara Suthane Saranam"	S.Ramesan Nair
4.	"Bhootanatha"	S.Ramesan Nair
5.	"Thedi Thedi"	Biju B Nair	Saawan Rithu	3:10
