= Swami Ayyappan (2012 film) =

- Directed by: Chetan Sharma; Mahesh Vettiyar
- Written by: Mahesh Vettiyar
- Produced by: Raju Odunghat
- Music by: Viswajith
- Production companies: Animagic Special Effects; Toonz Animation India
- Release date: 29 October 2012 (India)
- Running time: 90 minutes
- Country: India
- Language: Malayalam

Swami Ayyappan is a 2012 Indian Malayalam-language animated film about the legend of Swami Ayyappan. It is the first animated portrayal of Ayyappan. The 90-minute film, produced through a collaboration of Toonz Animation India and Animagic Motion Pictures Production, was planned to be released in theatres in Malayalam alongside dubbed versions in Kannada, Tamil, and Telugu languages. Mahesh Vettiyar wrote the story, and co-directed the film with Chetan Sharma. P. Jayakumar served as executive producer.

== Synopsis ==
The film covers Ayyappan's life at Pandalam as the young Manikandan, born out of the union between Shiva and Vishnu in his Mohini avatar, his childhood at the gurukul, and the miracles he performed. It depicts Manikandan's fight with Udayana, the slaying of the demoness Mahishi and the instances that lead to his friendship with Vavar, a robber from Turkistan. This friendship is considered to be the epitome of religious tolerance till this day. Once the purpose of his embodiment is fulfilled, Manikandan gets united with the idol in the Sabarimala Temple and is henceforth known as ‘Swami Ayyappan’.

== Reception ==
The movie's promo won a 2013 TASI Anifest India Viewer's Choice Award in the 'best film - commissioned' category, and a 2014 FICCI BAF award for Best Animated promo (international).
