= Mahalingapuram Ayyappan Temple =

Ayyappan temple in Chennai

- Ayyappan Temple, Mahalingapuram (Chennai)

Religion
- Affiliation: Hinduism
- District: Chennai district
- Deity: Ayyappan
- Festivals: Gokulashtami, Makar Sankranti, Chitrai Vishu, 1st day of Tamil Karthigai month

Location
- Location: Nungambakkam
- State: Tamil Nadu
- Country: India
- Coordinates: 13°03′23.0″N 80°13′54.5″E

Architecture
- Type: Kerala Architecture
- Completed: 1974

Specifications
- Temple: 2
- Elevation: 34 m (112 ft)

Website
- www.ayyappantemplesabs.org

Mahalingapuram Ayyappan Temple or Mahalingapuram Ayyappan - Guruvayurappan Temples is a Hindu Temple dedicated to the Hindu god Ayyappan, located at Mahalingapuram in the neighbourhood of Nungambakkam in Chennai district in the state of Tamil Nadu in the peninsular India with the geographical coordinates of 13°03′23.0″N 80°13′54.5″E (i.e., 13.056400°N, 80.231800°E) and at an altitude of about 34 m above the mean sea level. This temple complex contains Ayyappan temple and Guruvayurappan temple adjacent to each other. And is built based on Kerala Architecture. Swamy Ayyappan appears to devotees as in a sitting posture on Srichakra with the symbol of chinmuthra, the height being about 2 ft. The temple is constructed in the year 1974.

The Ayyappan devotees who wish to visit Sabarimala Temple in Kerala follow heritage fasting procedures for 41 days from the first day of Tamil month Karthigai. In this manner, the devotees from Mahalingapuram and its surrounding areas start the procedures after worshipping Ayyappan in this Mahalingapuram Ayyappan temple.

Every Ayyappan Temple is noted with the word Thaththuvamasi (തത്ത്വമസി in Malayalam). The quote means 'You are what you seek'. That is, it is the essence that we must realize that the divinity is filled within everyone.

Each and every Ayyappan temple is built with a model of a structure with 18 steps. Mahalingapuram Ayyappan Temple also has this structure and the 18 steps imply the following:

1. Birth is impermanent.
2. Shankya Yoga.
3. Karma Yoga.
4. Wisdom Yoga.
5. Sannyasi Yoga.
6. Meditation Yoga.
7. Gnana Vignana Yoga.
8. Atsara Brahma Yoga.
9. Rajavidya Rajaguhya Yoga.
10. Vibhuti Yoga.
11. Visvarupa Darshan Yoga.
12. Bhakti Yoga.
13. Seshatra Vibhaga Yoga.
14. Gunatraya Vibhaga Yoga.
15. Purushottama Yoga.
16. Taivasurasambat Vibhaga Yoga.
17. Chratatharaya Vibhaga Yoga.
18. Moksha Sannyasa Yoga.

== Shrines ==
The shrines of deities such as Ayyappan, Shiva, Bhagavati, Ganapathy, Subramaniar are some of the important shrines in this temple.

== Festivals ==
Gokulashtami, Makar Sankranti, Chithirai Vishu, 1st day of Tamil month Karthigai are some of the important festivals celebrated in this temple.
