= Bhasmasura =

Hindu mythological antagonist

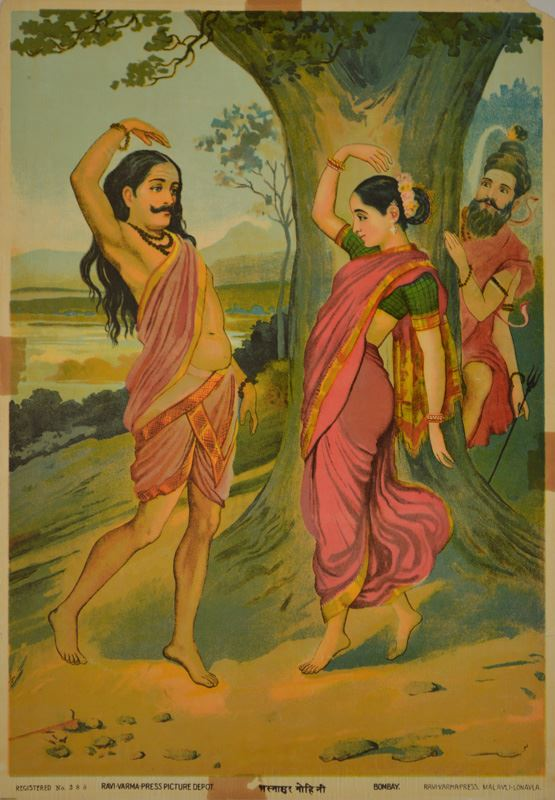
- Mohini tricks Bhasmasura (left), while Shiva looks on from behind a tree
- Affiliation: Daitya
- Texts: Puranas

In Hinduism, Bhasmasura (Sanskrit: भस्मासुर, Bhasmāsura) is an asura or demon, who was granted the power to burn up and immediately turn into ashes (bhasma) anyone whose head he touched with his hand. The asura was tricked by the Vishnu's only female avatar, the enchantress Mohini, to turn himself into ashes.

== Legend ==
While Bhasmasura is a character who does not appear in the Puranas, his story is mentioned in regional literature. The asura is stated to have been born of the bhasma dust (ashes) on the body of Shiva. Pleased at the great devotion of the demon towards him, Shiva agreed to grant a boon of his choice. Bhasmasura sought the power to burn to ashes anybody on whose head he placed his hand. Shiva granted this to him. Bhasmasura became arrogant with the boon, and he wanted to test his boon by putting his hand on Lord Shiva. Vishnu assumed the form of the ravishing Mohini, an attractive dancer, who allured him with her charm, and initiated a dance called the Muktanṛtya. During the course of this dance, Bhasmasura was forced to place his hand on his own head. The moment his hand touched his head, he was burnt to ashes.

== Dance ==
Based on the popular story, the dancers take different postures leading to them ultimately revolving both their hands on their heads. The dancer enacting Bhasmasura is placed at the end of row and he is the last dancer to revolve his hands over his head.

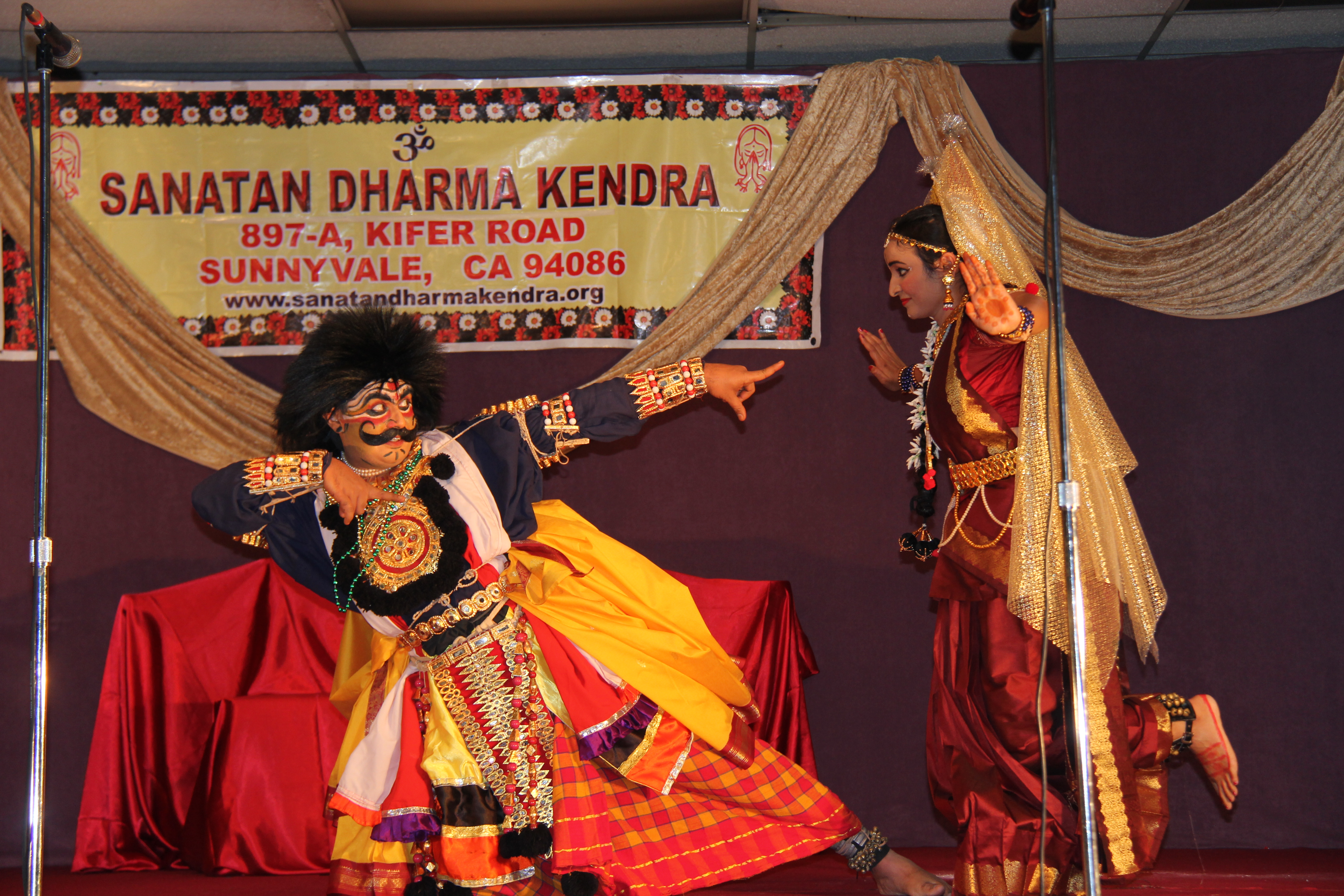
Bhasmasura and Mohini as depicted in Yakshagana

The Bhasmasura-type pose--with one hand atop the head and the other behind the back--is also common in women's dancing in the Bhojpuri region and, by extension, in Indo-Caribbean society, where it is a typical feature of chutney dancing. A few Indo-Caribbeans claim that this pose relates to the Bhasmasura myth.

== Other Versions ==
In Ramakien, The Thai version of the Ramayana, Bhasmasura is combined with Ravana (Thotsakan in Ramakien).
