= Harivarasanam =

Lullaby played at Sabarimala

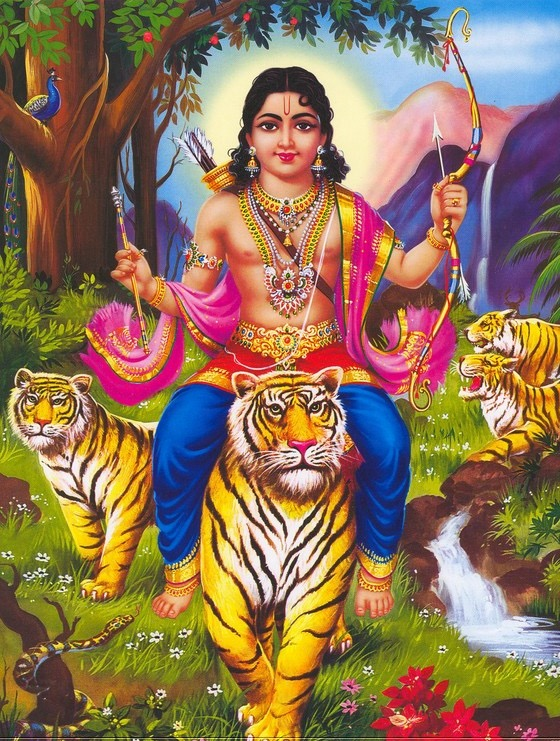
Lord Ayappan

Harivarasanam (Malayalam: ഹരിവരാസനം) is a Sanskritised Malayalam ashtakam sung as a lullaby to Lord Ayyappan at the Sabarimala Sree Dharma Sastha Temple, situated in Kerala, India. The song became popular through the first stanza in the Keerthanam known as Hariharatmajashtakam (Malayalam: ഹരിഹരാത്മജാഷ്ട്ടകം). The traditional version of the song is sung vocally inside the temple during the daily temple closing ceremony and the popular version of the song is played simultaneously for the devotees.

== Background ==
The exact origin of the song is unclear and contested. The earliest one of the claims mentions Kambankudi Kulathu Iyer as the composer, who authored a collection of devotional songs named "Harivarasanam Viswamohanam" which included the song. The latter claims the composer as Konnakathu Janaki Amma, which goes on to mention that she composed the keerthanam as an offering to Lord Ayyappa and she had submitted the work to her father, Ananthakrishna Iyer, who was the then Sabarimala Melshanthi (Chief Priest).

A Padmakumar, Ex-TDB president and also a descendant of Konnakathu Janaki Amma, had claimed that the family possess original handwritten notes of the author to prove the authorship. All these records mention Srinivasa Iyer as the sambadakan (compiler). The reason behind this is believed that back then, people would not write their name when submitting a creative work as an offering at the temple.

It is believed that Swami Vimochanananda was the first to recite the keerthanam at Sabarimala in the early 1950s. The practice has been to recite it at the end of the day's rituals, to put Lord Ayyapan to sleep, and the tradition has continued since.

The lullaby became extremely popular all over southern India, when it was included in the famous Malayalam film Swami Ayyappan in 1975. The song was rendered by Carnatic vocalist and playback singer K. J. Yesudas and composed in the Madhyamavati raga by composer late G. Devarajan.

== Lyrics ==
In Malayalam

ഹരിവരാസനം വിശ്വമോഹനം
ഹരിദധീശ്വരം ആരാധ്യപാദുകം
അരി വിമര്‍ദ്ദനം നിത്യ നര്‍ത്തനം
ഹരിഹരാത്മജം ദേവമാശ്രയേ

ശരണ കീര്‍ത്തനം ഭക്തമാനസം
ഭരണലോലുപം നര്‍ത്തനാലസം
അരുണഭാസുരം ഭൂതനായകം
ഹരിഹരാത്മജം ദേവമാശ്രയേ

പ്രണയസത്യകം പ്രാണനായകം
പ്രണതകല്പകം സുപ്രഭാഞ്ചിതം
പ്രണവ മന്ദിരം കീര്‍ത്തനപ്രിയം
ഹരിഹരാത്മജം ദേവമാശ്രയേ

തുരഗവാഹനം സുന്ദരാനനം
വരഗദായുധം വേദവർണ്ണിതം
ഗുരുകൃപാകരം കീര്‍ത്തനപ്രിയം
ഹരിഹരാത്മജം ദേവമാശ്രയേ

ത്രിഭുവനാര്‍ച്ചിതം ദേവതാത്മകം
ത്രിനയനം പ്രഭും ദിവ്യദേശികം
ത്രിദശപൂജിതം ചിന്തിതപ്രദം
ഹരിഹരാത്മജം ദേവമാശ്രയേ

ഭവഭയാവഹം ഭാവുകാവഹം
ഭുവനമോഹനം ഭൂതിഭൂഷണം
ധവളവാഹനം ദിവ്യവാരണം
ഹരിഹരാത്മജം ദേവമാശ്രയേ

കളമൃദുസ്മിതം സുന്ദരാനനം
കളഭകോമളം ഗാത്രമോഹനം
കളഭകേസരി വാജിവാഹനം
ഹരിഹരാത്മജം ദേവമാശ്രയേ

ശ്രിതജനപ്രിയം ചിന്തിതപ്രദം
ശ്രുതിവിഭൂഷണം സാധുജീവനം
ശ്രുതിമനോഹരം ഗീതലാലസം
ഹരിഹരാത്മജം ദേവമാശ്രയേ

ശരണമയ്യപ്പാ സ്വാമി ശരണമയ്യപ്പാ
ശരണമയ്യപ്പാ സ്വാമി ശരണമയ്യപ്പാ

IAST transcription

harivarāsanaṃ viśvamōhanam
haridadhīśvaraṃ ārādhyapādukam
arivimardanaṃ nityanartanam
hariharātmajaṃ dēvamāśrayē

śaraṇakīrtanaṃ bhaktamānasam
bharaṇalōlupaṃ nartanālasam
aruṇabhāsuraṃ bhūtanāyakam
hariharātmajaṃ dēvamāśrayē

praṇayasatyakaṃ prāṇanāyakam
praṇatakalpakaṃ suprabhāñchitam
praṇavamandiraṃ kīrtanapriyam
hariharātmajaṃ dēvamāśrayē

turagavāhanaṃ sundarānanam
varagadāyudhaṃ vēdavarṇitam
gurukṛpākaraṃ kīrtanapriyam
hariharātmajaṃ dēvamāśrayē

tribhuvanārchitaṃ dēvatātmakam
trinayanaprabhuṃ divyadēśikam
tridaśapūjitaṃ chintitapradam
hariharātmajaṃ dēvamāśrayē

bhavabhayāpahaṃ bhāvukāvakam
bhuvanamōhanaṃ bhūtibhūṣaṇam
dhavaḻavāhanaṃ divyavāraṇam
hariharātmajaṃ dēvamāśrayē

kaḻamṛdusmitaṃ sundarānanam
kaḻabhakōmalaṃ gātramōhanam
kaḻabhakēsarīvājivāhanam
hariharātmajaṃ dēvamāśrayē

śritajanapriyaṃ chintitapradam
śrutivibhūṣaṇaṃ sādhujīvanam
śrutimanōharaṃ gītalālasam
hariharātmajaṃ dēvamāśrayē

śaraṇaṃ ayyappā svāmi śaraṇaṃ ayyappā
śaraṇaṃ ayyappā svāmi śaraṇaṃ ayyappā

English translation

Repository of Hari’s boons, Enchanter of the universe,
Essence of Hari’s grace, He whose holy feet is worshipped,
He who kills enemies by good thought, He who dances the cosmic dance daily,
Son of Hari and Hara, I take refuge in thee, Oh Lord

He who likes song of refuge, He who is in the mind of devotees,
He who is the great ruler, He who loves to dance,
He who shines like the rising sun, He who is the king of all beings,
Son of Hari and Hara, I take refuge in thee, Oh Lord

He whose is true love, He who is the darling of soul,
He who created the universe, He who shines with a glittering halo,
He who is the temple of om, He who loves songs,
Son of Hari and Hara, I take refuge in thee, Oh Lord

He who rides a horse, He who has a pretty face,
He who has the blessed mace as his weapon, He who is glorified by the Vedas
He who bestows grace like a teacher, He who loves songs,
Son of Hari and Hara, I take refuge in thee, Oh Lord

He who is worshiped by the three worlds,
He who is the soul of all Gods,
He who is the Three - eyed Lord (Shiva),
He who is worshipped by the devas

He who is worshipped three times a day,
He whose thought itself is fulfilling,
Son of Hari and Hara,
I take refuge in thee, Oh Lord

He who destroys fear, He who brings prosperity,
He who is the enchanter of universe, He who wears holy ash as an ornament,
He who rides a white noble elephant,
Son of Hari and Hara, I take refuge in thee, Oh Lord

He who blesses with an enchanting smile, He who has a pretty face,
He who is adorned with sandalwood paste, He who has a pretty physique,
He who rides on a royal lion and tiger,
Son of Hari and Hara, I take refuge in thee, Oh Lord

He who is dear to his devotees, He whose thought itself is fulfilling,
He who is praised by songs, He who lives life of an ascetic,
He who is the essence of hearing sweet music, He who enjoys divine music,
Son of Hari and Hara, I take refuge in thee, Oh Lord

My refuge is in you Ayyappa,
My refuge is in you Ayyappa

== Harivarasanam Centenary Celebrations ==
Harivarasanam was originally written in the year 1923, and in the year 2023, Centenary celebrations were taken up by Sabarimala Ayyappa Seva Samajam across India. Celebrations were launched by Governor of Tamil Nadu state, and meastro Ilayaraja was selected as National Committee Chairman for the celebrations.

== Harivarasanam Award ==
The Harivarasanam Award was instituted in 2012 and is jointly awarded by the Government of Kerala and the Travancore Devaswom Board. It is awarded for contributions towards propagation of religious coexistence, equanimity, and universal brotherhood of Sabarimala through music. The award winner is announced ahead of the annual Makaravilakku festival.

== See also ==
- Sabarimala Sree Dharma Shasta Temple
- Shasta
- Mahishasuramardini Stotra
