= Ayyappan Temple, Perambur =

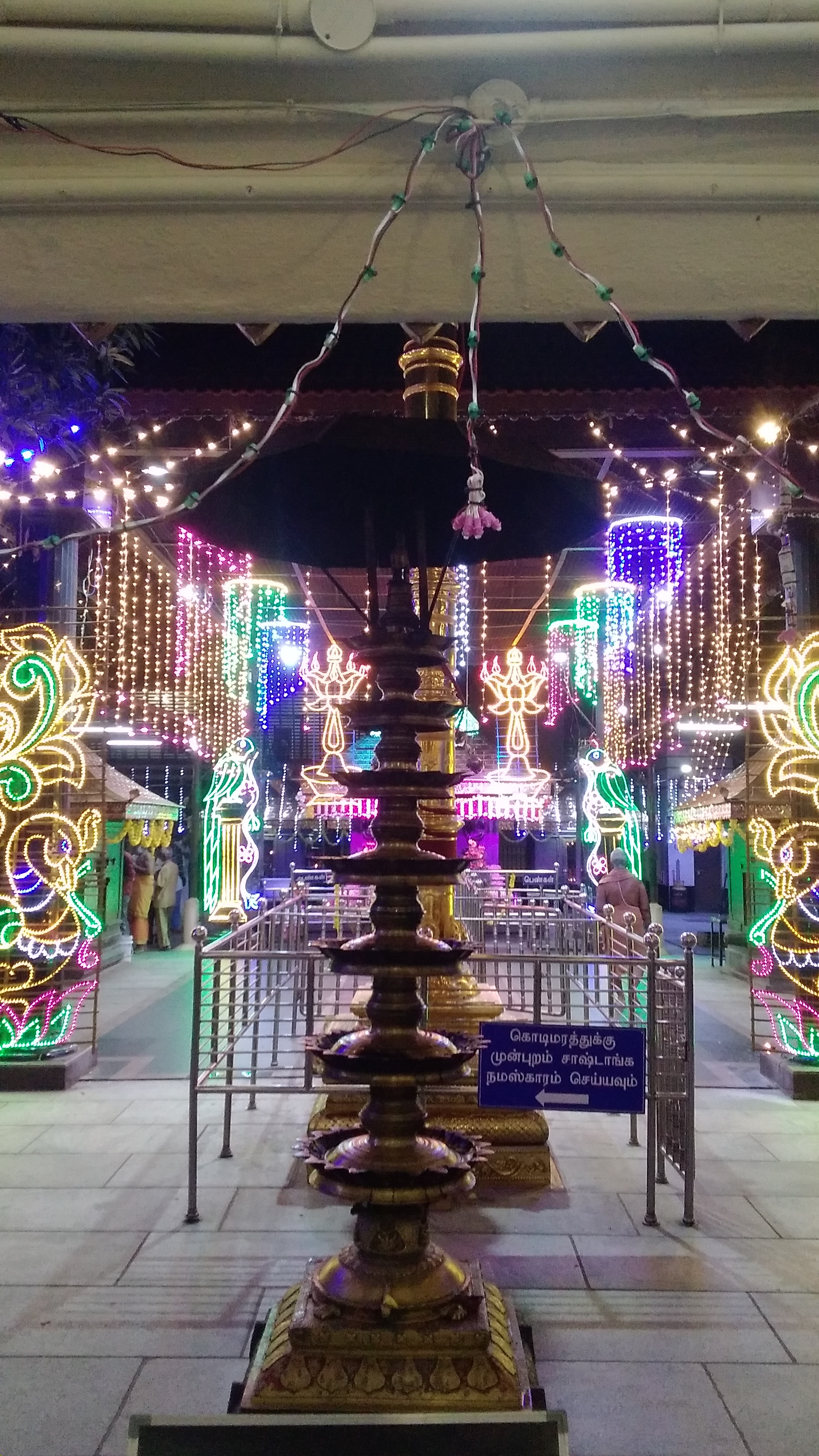
- Ayyappan Temple, Perambur, Chennai, India

- Ayyappan Temple, Perambur, Chennai, Tamil Nadu

Religion
- Affiliation: Hinduism
- District: Chennai
- Deity: Ayyappan
- Festivals: Ayiliya pooja, Mandala Vilakku pooja, Aaraattu, Pallivetta

Location
- Location: Perambur
- State: Tamil Nadu
- Country: India
- Interactive map of Ayyappan Temple, Perambur
- Coordinates: 13.110861°N 80.245556°E

Architecture
- Type: Dravidian architecture
- Creator: Perambur Sree Ayyappa Trust

Specifications
- Temple: One
- Elevation: 33 m (108 ft)

Ayyappan Temple is a Hindu temple situated in Perambur neighbourhood of Chennai in Tamil Nadu state, India.

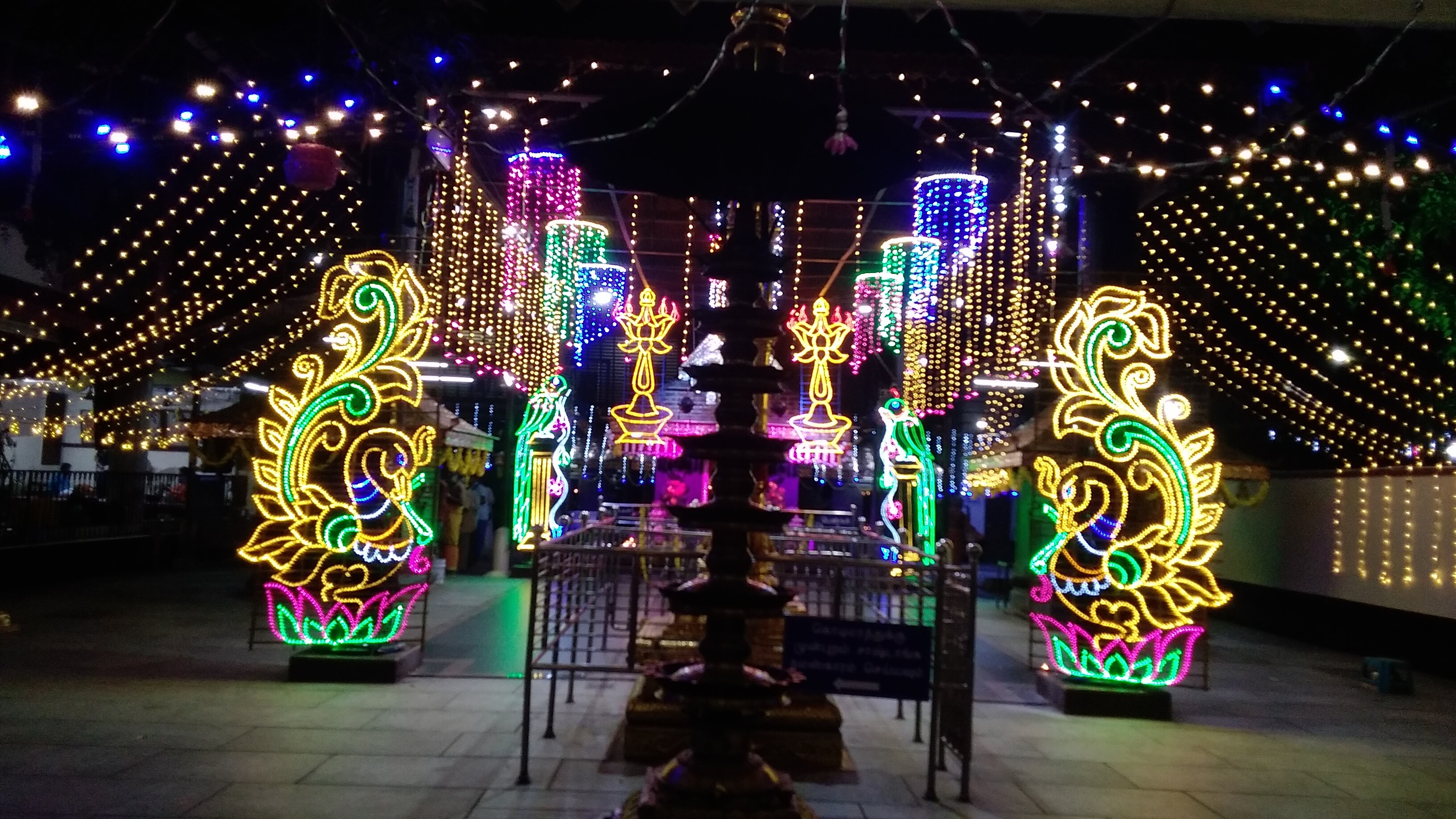
Perambur Ayyappan Temple, Chennai, Tamil Nadu, India

== Details ==
Perambur Ayyappan temple is one of the Hindu temples where Vidyāraṃbhaṃ, a ceremony held for children to start their learning education is performed every year on the Vijayadashami day. Ayiliya, Mandala Vilakku, Aaraattu and Pallivetta are celebrated in this temple.

The main deity of this temple is Ayyappan. Guruvayurappan, Maligaipurathu Amman, Shiva, Ganapathy, Murugan, Hanuman and Nagarajar are the subdeities who bless the devotees in this temple.
