= Ayyappan Temple, Coimbatore =

Hindu temple in Coimbatore, India

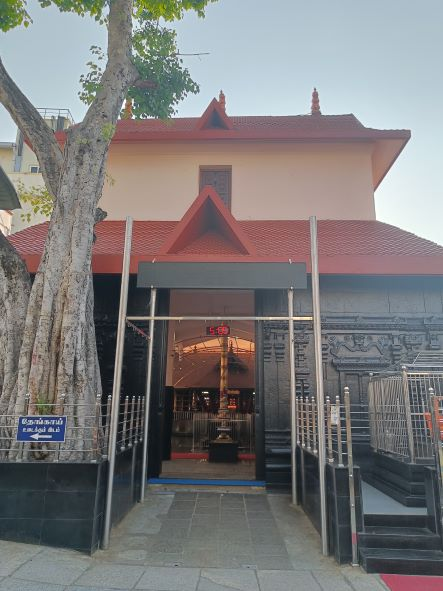

Religion
- Affiliation: Hinduism
- District: Coimbatore District

Location
- Location: Siddhapudur, Coimbatore
- State: Tamil Nadu
- Country: India
- Geographic coordinates: 11°01′14.9″N 76°58′22.1″E

Architecture
- Type: South India, Temples
- Elevation: 444 m (1,457 ft)

Ayyappan Temple is a Hindu Ayyappan Temple located in Siddhapudur in Coimbatore, India. It is dedicated to Ayyappan.

== Presiding deity ==
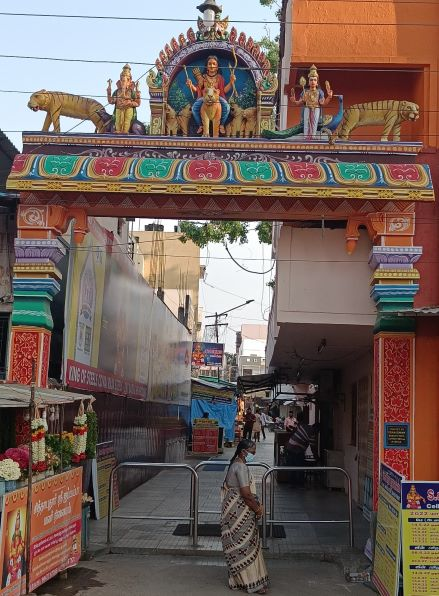
Entrance

The presiding deity is known as Manikandan. As per the Kerala style, shrines of Ganesha, Bhagavati, Siva, Guruvayurappan and Muruga are found. The shrine of Navagraha is also found here. The devotees are extremely proud of the status of the temple as the Second Sabarimala. The poojas and other religious rituals are observed similar to the fashion in Sabarimala. Plans for the construction of a temple devoted to Lord Ayyappan started way back in 1942 with the coming together of a group of devotees. On 24 March 1969 Kumbhabhishekam was held and in 1972 a Dhwaja Stambha was set up and later was covered with gold. It is the only one of its kind in Tamil Nadu.

== Festivals ==
Pradosha, Ekadashi, Karthikai and Sivaratri and the festivals celebrated in this temple.

== Opening time ==
The temple is opened for worship from 5.00 a.m. to 10.30 a.m and 4.00 p.m. to 8.00 p.m.
