= Rajah Annamalaipuram Ayyappan Koil, Chennai =

Hindu temple dedicated to the deity Ayyappa in Chennai, India

Rajah Annamalaipuram Ayyappan Koil
- Location in Chennai

Religion
- Affiliation: Hinduism
- District: Chennai
- Deity: Ayyappa
- Governing body: Rajah Annamalaipuram Sri Iyyappa Swami Temple Trust

Location
- Location: 82, Santhome High Road, Rajah Annamalaipuram 600 028
- State: Tamil Nadu
- Country: India
- Coordinates: 13°1′7″N 80°16′5″E

Architecture
- Type: Hindu temple architecture, Kerala Style
- Creator: M.A.M. Ramaswamy Chettiar (Chettinad Group)
- Established: 1981
- Completed: 1982
- Temple: 1

Website
- http://www.iyyappaswami.com/index.html

Rajah Annamalaipuram Ayyappan Koil is a Hindu temple dedicated to the deity Ayyappa in Chennai, India. It is located at Raja Annamalaipuram, a coastal neighbourhood of Chennai.

== History ==
The temple was built by noted industrialist M. A. M. Ramaswamy Chettiar, son of Rajah Sir Muthiah Chettiar of the Chettinad Royal Family, who upon taking a pilgrimage to Sabarimala envisioned building a similar temple in 1973. The temple was established in 1981 and constructed and congregated in 1982 on the land donated to the temple by Rajah Sir Muthiah Chettiar. The Ayyappa idol, made of Panchaloha (five precious metals representing the five elements of nature), was made by Sri Bhattanachariar, a sculptor from Nagercoil. It was taken in a procession from the Krishnan Temple in Nagercoil to various places of religious importance in Tamil Nadu before it was installed in the Rajah Annamalaipuram temple on 25 January 1982. The first kumbabishekam (renovative ablution) was performed on 29 January 1982 and the second one was performed on 27 March 1994.

On 2008, third kumbabishegam was performed.

On 27 March 2024, fourth Kumbabishegam was performed with three new additional sanctums. (Vinayagar, Navagraham and Anjaneyar)

== The temple ==
The temple is built as an exact replica of the original Ayyappan Temple at Sabarimala in Kerala. The temple was constructed in three floors presumably to lend the feeling of being atop a hill similar to the Sabarimala hill. The architecture follows the Kerala style and tradition with 18 steps to the main shrine and the sanctum sanctorum. The temple is known as Vada Sabari or North Sabarimala. Methods of worship is similar to the Sabarimala temple, whereby devotees observe all fasting, carry Irumudi (the sacred twin baggage) and sing bhajans as they do for a pilgrimage to Sabarimala. There is a separate passage for other devotees coming to the temple without the Irumudi. The temple has all the features of Sabarimala with sub-shrines of Kannimoola Maha Ganapathy (Ganesha), Maalikapurathamma, Nagaraja, Karuppunnaswamy, Valiya Kadutha Swamy and other deities. The single piece Dhvajasthamba or kodimaram (the flag post) of the temple is 40 feet tall. A meditation hall measuring 125 feet by 100 feet below the temple is where pilgrims are made to stay during the Mandala Pooja and the main festival. It is built of Jaipur tiles and is capable of accommodating 1,500 devotees. Music performances, religious discourses and other events are held in the hall during the festival and other important days.

The temple has a golden and a silver chariots taken on procession during festival days.

== Worship ==
The poojas (religious practices) in the temple are performed per the rules in Sabarimala, the difference being that the Sabarimala temple is open only on specific days in a year, while Rajah Annamalaipuram temple is open to devotees throughout the year.

== Festivals ==
The festivals at the temple begin from Karthikai first day (in November) with Mandala Pujas and Brahmotsavam.
