= Swami Ayyappan (1975 film) =

- Poster of the Tamil version
- Directed by: P. Subramaniam
- Written by: Sreekumaran Thampi
- Produced by: P. Subramaniam
- Starring: Gemini Ganesan; Thikkurissy; Master Raghu
- Cinematography: Masthan
- Edited by: N. Gopalakrishnan
- Music by: G. Devarajan
- Production company: Neela Productions
- Distributed by: Kumaraswami and Co.
- Release date: 17 August 1975
- Country: India
- Languages: Malayalam; Tamil

Swami Ayyappan (transl. Lord Ayyappan) is a 1975 Indian Hindu mythological film. Directed and produced by P. Subramaniam, it was simultaneously shot in Malayalam and Tamil. The film stars Gemini Ganesan, Thikkurissy Sukumaran Nair, Master Raghu/Karan, K. Balaji, Sekhar, Srividya, Unnimary, Lakshmi, Raghavan, Rani Chandra and Vinodini. The film met with critical acclaim and became a box office success. It won four Kerala State Film Awards. The film helped popularise the shrine of Sabarimala further in Tamil Nadu.

== Cast ==
- Master Raghu (childhood) and Master Sekhar (adolescence) as Manikandan
- Gemini Ganesan as Pandalam Raja
- Srividya as Pandalam Maharani
- Thikkurissy Sukumaran Nair as Guru
- Lakshmi as Mohini
- Sukumari as Muthaliyar's wife
- Sudheer as Lord Shiva
- Raghavan as Prabhakaran
- P. K. Abraham
- S. P. Pillai
- Kedamangalam Sadanandan
- V. K. Ramasamy
- Bahadoor
- Rajasree
- Janardhanan
- Vanchiyoor Madhavan Nair
- S. A. Fareed
- Harikesam Thampi
- Vijayakumar
- Unnimary as Maalikapurathamma
- Aranmula Ponnamma
- Baby Sumathi as Young girl
- Baby Vinodini
- Anandavally
- Shubha
- Dhanya
- T.M.S
- K. Balaji as Vavar
- Rani Chandra
- R. S. Manohar as Lord Vishnu
- Madhu (guest role)

== Soundtrack ==
The music is composed by G. Devarajan. The song "Harivarasanam" sung by K. J. Yesudas and composed (in Madhyamavati raga) by G. Devarajan for the film later became part of the daily routine of Sabarimala Temple. It is played every night during the closing ceremony of the temple.

No.	Title	Lyrics	Singers(s)	Length
1.	"Harinaaraayana"	Vayalar Ramavarma	K. J. Yesudas
2.	"Harivaraasanam"	Kumbakudi Kulathur Iyer	K. J. Yesudas
3.	"Harivaraasanam" (Choir)	Kumbakudi Kulathur Iyer	K. J. Yesudas, Choir
4.	"Kailaasa Shailaadhi"	Vayalar Ramavarma	P. Leela, Sreekanth
5.	"Mannilum Vinnilum"	Sreekumaran Thampi	K. J. Yesudas, Choir
6.	"Paalaazhi Kadanjeduthorazhakaanu"	Vayalar Ramavarma	P. Madhuri
7.	"Ponnumvigraha Vadivilirikkum"	Sreekumaran Thampi	Ambili, Choir
8.	"Shabarimalayil"	Vayalar Ramavarma	K. J. Yesudas
9.	"Swami Charanam Charanam Pon Ayyappa"	Kannadasan	T. M. Soundararajan, Chorus
10.	"Swami Sharanam"	Vayalar Ramavarma	P. Jayachandran, Choir
11.	"Swarnakkodi Marathil"	Sreekumaran Thampi	P. Jayachandran, P. Madhuri, Chorus, Sreekanth
12.	"Swarnnamani"	Sreekumaran Thampi
13.	"Thedivarum Kannukalil"	Kannadasan	Ambili
14.	"Thummiyaal Therikkunna"	Vayalar Ramavarma	P. Jayachandran, Choir

== Accolades ==
Kerala State Film Awards

- Best Film with Popular Appeal and Aesthetic Value – Swami Ayyappan
- Best Child Artist – Master Raghu/Karan
- Best Cinematography – Masthan
- Best Lyrics – Vayalar Ramavarma
