= Ayyappan =

Hindu deity

- God of truth, righteousness, self-discipline and celibacy
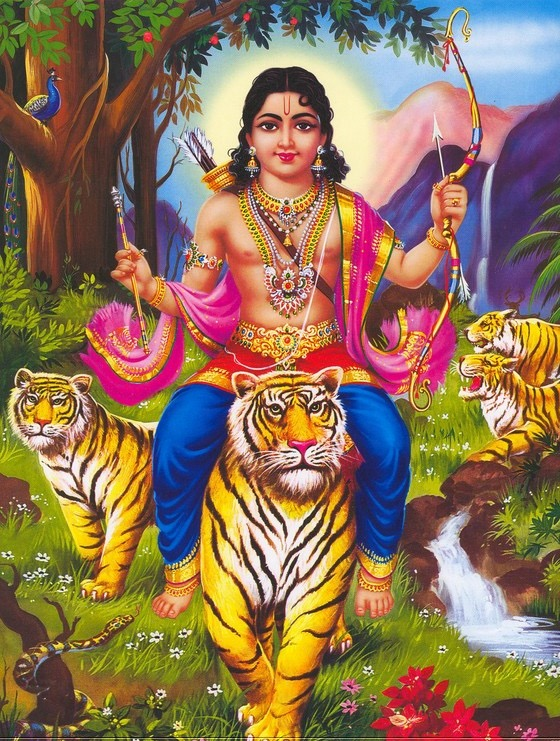
- Ayyappa(n) seated on a tiger
- Affiliation: Hinduism
- Abode: Sabarimala
- Mantra: Swāmiye Śaraṇam Ayyappa
- Weapon: Bow and arrow, sword
- Symbols: Bell, bow and arrow
- Day: Saturday
- Mount: Tiger, stallion
- Texts: Brahmanda Purana
- Gender: Male
- Festivals: Makaravilakku

Genealogy
- Born: Manikandan
- Parents: Shiva (father); Mohini (mother)

Ayyappan, also known as Dharmasastha and Manikandan, is the Hindu deity of truth and righteousness. According to Hindu theology, he is described as the son of Shiva and Mohini (the female avatar of Vishnu), thus representing a bridge between Shaivism and Vaishnavism.

Ayyappan is a warrior deity and is revered for his ascetic devotion to Dharma, the ethical and right way of living. He is usually depicted as a youthful man riding or near a Bengal tiger and holding a bow and arrow. In some representations, he is seen holding a sword and riding an Indian elephant or a horse. Other iconography generally shows him in a yogic posture wearing a bell around his neck.

The legend and mythology of Ayyappan varies across regions, reflecting a tradition that evolved over time. According to Malayalam lore, Ayyappan is presented as a warrior prince of Pandala kingdom. In the later years, the stories of Ayyappan expanded with various versions describing him as a warrior who protected people from evil doers while helping restore Dharmic practices and he evolved to be a deity. In some regions, Ayyappan and Tamil folk deity Ayyanar are considered to be the same with similar characteristics.

Although Ayyappan worship has been prevalent earlier in Kerala, his popularity spread to most of Southern India in the 20th century. There are several temples in the region dedicated to him, the foremost of which is Sabarimala. Sabarimala is located on the banks of the Pamba river in the forests of the Western Ghats, and is a major pilgrimage destination, attracting millions annually. Pilgrims often engage in weeks of preparations in advance by leading a simpler life, remaining celibate, and trekking to the hill barefoot while carrying an irumudi (a bag with offerings) on the head.

== Names and etymology ==
The name Ayyappan is a combination of two words ayyan and appan. Ayyan in Tamil and the Malayalam word acchan mean "father". Appan also means "father" in Tamil, and both these words are also used as honorific titles. In Hindu texts, he is described as the son of Mohini (the female form of Vishnu) and Shiva with the name Ayyappan connoting as "lord-father". The name could have also been derived from the combination of aryan and appan with the former meaning "revered".

In Hindu scriptures such as Vishnu Purana and Srimad Bhagavatham, he is referenced as Dharmasastha and Sastha, meaning "ruler of the realm". The word Sastha could have also been derived from Buddhism as Ayyappan is seen as an incarnation of Buddha and Buddha was known by the same name, meaning "teacher". He is also known as Hariharasuthan, meaning the "son of Harihara", a fusion of Hari and Hara, the names given to Vishnu and Shiva respectively. He is also called Manikanda with mani meaning bell and kanda meaning neck in Sanskrit, and meaning the wearer of a bell on his neck.

== Iconography and depictions ==
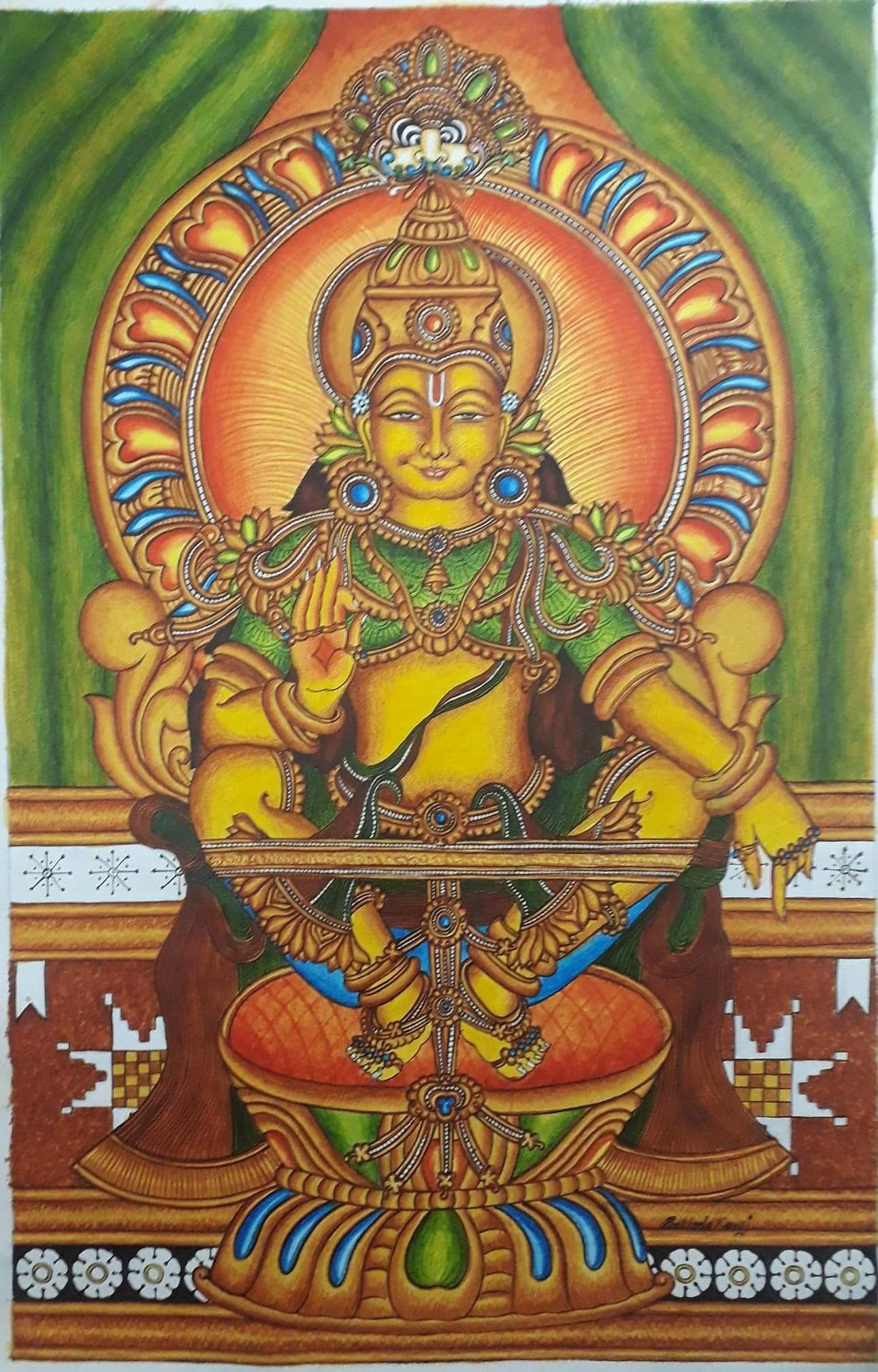
A painting of Lord Ayyappan is depicted in Yogapattasana, a sacred yogic posture.

Ayyappan is a warrior deity and is revered for his ascetic devotion to Dharma, the ethical and right way of living, deployment of his military genius and yogic war abilities to destroy those who are powerful but unethical, abusive and arbitrary. He is usually represented as a celibate young man holding a bow and arrow, and riding a Bengal tiger. In some representations, he is seen holding an upraised bow in his left hand, while holding either an arrow or sword in his right hand placed diagonally across his left thigh. Other iconography generally shows him in a yogic posture wearing a bell around his neck. In some representations, such as in Sri Lanka, he is shown riding an Indian elephant or a horse.

== Theology and historical development ==
The legend and mythology of Ayyappan vary across regions, reflecting a tradition that evolved over time. According to the Puranas, he is mentioned as an incarnation of Hariharaputra, the son of Shiva and Mohini (female form of Vishnu). While this interaction between Shiva and Vishnu is mentioned in the Bhagavata Purana, he is not referenced by the name Ayyappan.

According to Malayalam folklore, Ayyappan is presented as a warrior prince of Pandalam kingdom. The king of Pandalam found a baby boy on the banks of Pamba river. As the royal family was childless, the king named the boy Manikantha and raised him his own son, on the advice of an ascetic. When Manikantha was 12 years old, the king wanted to formally anoint him as the heir. However, the queen objected to it, as she favored her younger biological child. Planning to get rid of Manikantha, the queen feigned an illness, and asked for the milk of a tiger as a cure for her illness. She demanded that Manikantha be sent to obtain the same. Manikantha volunteered for the mission and went into the forest. He confronted and defeated the demoness Mahishi. Mahishi wanted to be his wife but Ayyappa being celibate, refused the offer and killed the demoness. He returned back to the kingdom riding on the back of a tiger. The king realised his special ability and recognised him to be a divine being and resolved to make a shrine for him. Manikantha transformed into Ayyappa and shot an arrow to mark the place for the new shrine.

There are minor variations in the story in other versions with Ayyappan renouncing the kingdom and becoming an ascetic yogi in a forested mountain. In another version, he is described as the son of the king's sister, who was born in the forest and sent to his uncle later. When the shrine of Sastha at Sabarimala was destroyed by the king's enemies, he defeated them, re-installed the statue and disappeared into it. In some versions, he was raised by a childless royal couple Rajashekara Pandian and Koperundevi, and grew up as a warrior yogi.

According to Paul Younger, supplementary legends appeared in the late Middle Ages that linked other Hindu deities and mythologies to Ayyappan. The divine beings Datta and Leela came to Earth as humans. Datta wanted to return to the divine realm, but Leela enjoyed her life on Earth and wanted to stay on Earth. He became angry and cursed her to become a Mahishi (water buffalo demoness). Leela in turn cursed him to become Mahisha, a water buffalo demon and they both plundered the earth with their evil acts. Mahisha was later killed by goddess Durga, while Mahishi was killed by Ayyapan, ending the terror of evil and liberating Leela who was previously cursed. These legends syncretically linked and combined various Hindu traditions around Shaivism, Vaishnavism and Shaktism.

In the later years, the stories of Ayyappan expanded. One such version has roots between the 1st and 3rd century CE, where he evolved to be a deity who protected traders and merchants from enemies such as robbers and plundering outlaws. His temples and traditions inspired Hindu yogi mercenaries who protected the trade routes in South India from criminals and helped restore Dharmic trading practices. In another version, he is portrayed as a child of a priest whose father was murdered by a fearsome outlaw. The outlaw kidnapped a princess and he made a daring rescue while killing the outlaw in the process. In a variation of the story, Ayyappan forms an alliance with the Muslim warrior Vavar against the outlaw Udayanan, which forms the basis for worshiping both in a Hindu temple and a mosque before starting a pilgrimage to Ayyappa shrine.

According to Eliza Kent, the legends relating to the Ayyappa tradition seem to be "artificially mixed and assembled into a kind of collage". Ruth Vanita suggested that Ayyappan probably emerged from the fusion of a Dravidian god of tribal provenance and the Puranic story of Shiva and Mohini's interaction. In some regions, Ayyappan and Tamil folk deity Ayyanar are considered to be the same with similar characteristics and is cited as a reason for his large following amongst Tamils.

== Worship ==
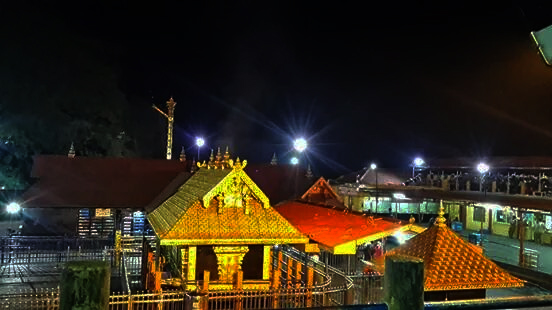
Dharma Sastha temple at Sabarimala

Although Ayyappan worship was prevalent earlier in Kerala, his popularity spread to most of Southern India in the 20th century. There are several Ayyappan temples across South India, the most prominent of which is located at Sabarimala. Sabarimala is located on the banks of the Pamba river amidst the hills of the Western Ghats in Kerala, and attracts millions of Hindu pilgrims every year. The temple is open only on select days of a year.

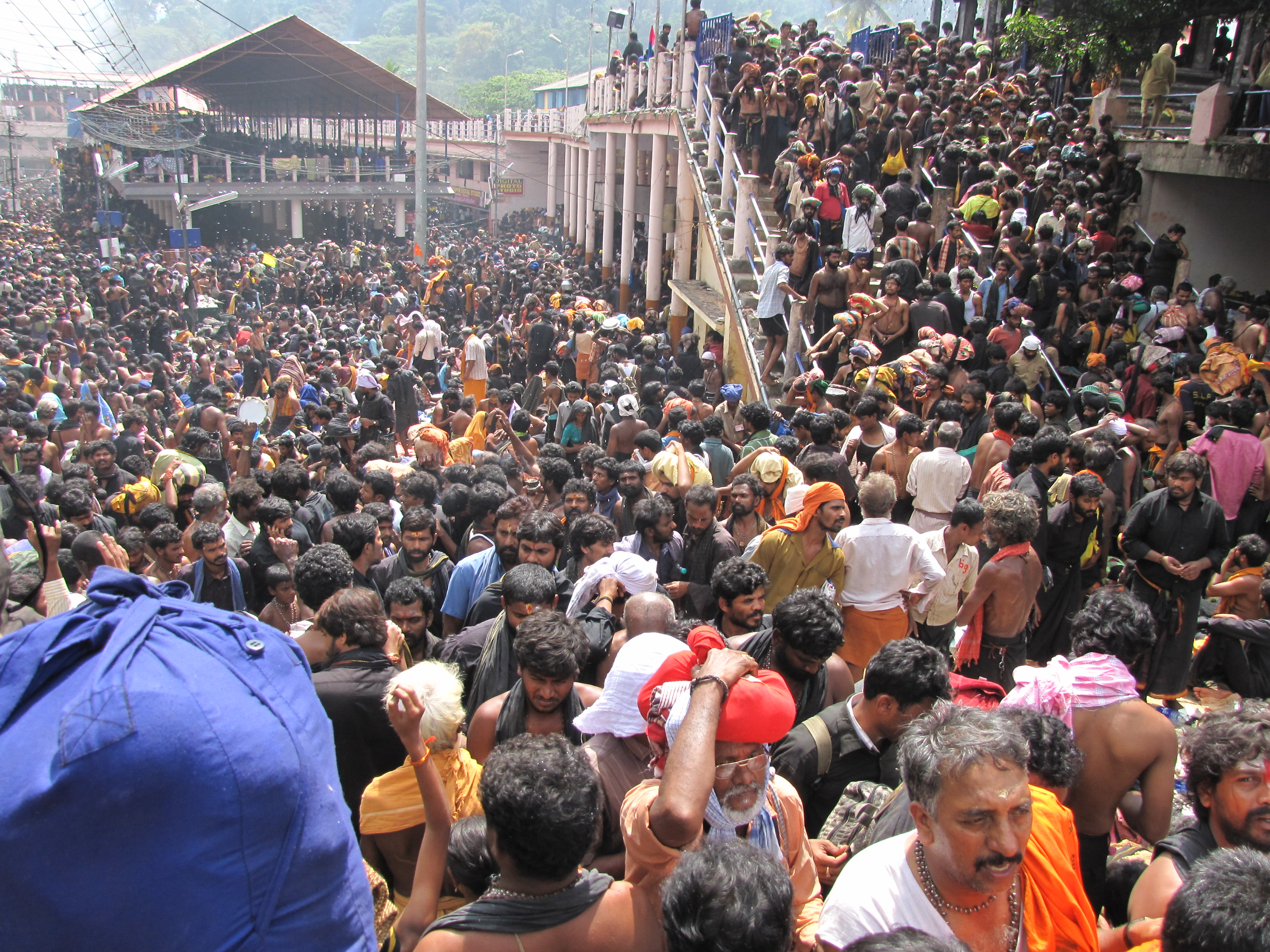
Pilgrims carrying irumudi at Sabarimala

Pilgrims planning to visit Sabarimala often begin preparations weeks in advance. They lead a simpler life, while remaining celibate, eating vegetarian diet or partially fasting and wearing a black or blue dress. These weeks of rituals are termed as vrutham which is signified by wearing a tulsi or rudraksha mala. The pilgrims refrain from any form of social or economic discrimination and form a fraternity treating each other as equals. They call each other by the name swami meaning "god". The pilgrims bath in the Pamba river and embark on a trek to the top of the hill on barefoot carrying an irumudi (a bag with two compartments containing offerings to the god) on the head. Then they climb the 18 steps in front of the shrine, each representing a dharmic value. The priests and devotees bring flowers and scatter them near the shrine while chanting various shlokas. As the deity is believed to be celibate, women in their fertile age are not allowed to enter the shrine.

Other temples dedicated to Ayyappan include Achankovil Sastha Temple, Aryankavu Sastha Temple, Erumely Sree Dharmasastha Temple, and Kulathupuzha Sastha Temple in Kerala. Temples are also located in Anna Nagar, Mahalingapuram, Perambur, and Rajah Annamalaipuram in Chennai, and Coimbatore. While Ayyappan temples typically show him as a celibate yogi, a few temples such as the Achankovil Sastha Temple depict him as a married man with two wives Poorna and Pushkala, and a son Satyaka. Some of the Ayyappan temples in the region are believed to have been established by Parashurama, an avatar of Vishnu. The most significant festival linked to him is the Makaravilakku, observed around the winter solstice. In Ponnambalamedu hillock in the Western Ghats, a ritual lighting of a large flame is carried out during the festival. Harivarasanam is a Manipravalam ashtakam composed in praise of Shiva and sung as a lullaby for Ayyappan.

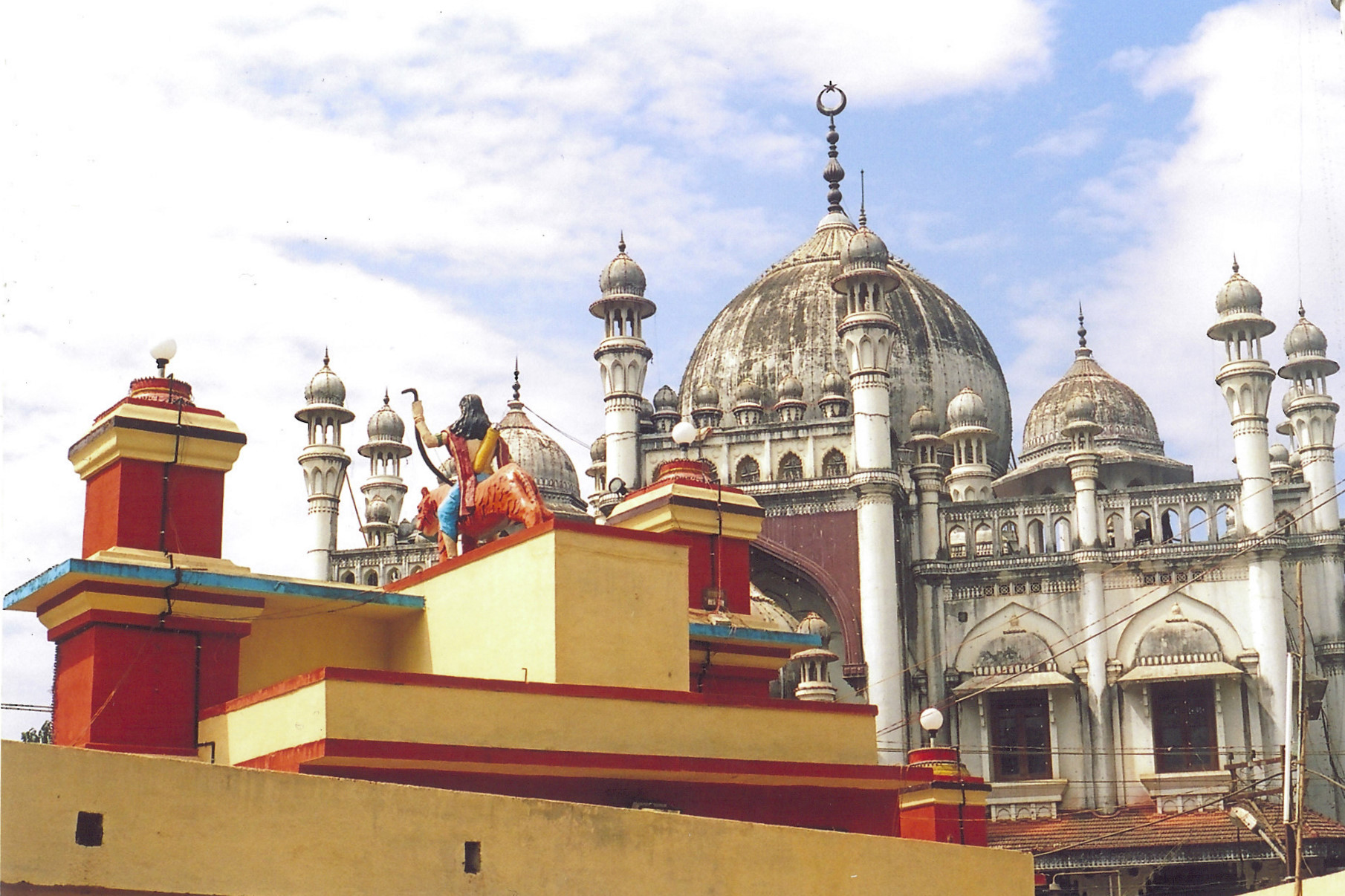
Vavar's mosque on the way to Sabarimala

Ayyappan remains one of the few deities in the Hindu pantheon, who is respected by other religious communities, including Muslims, and Christians. As per the Kerala government, there is a theory that the temple of Sabarimala was of Buddhist origin. Ayyappan is revered by Muslims in Kerala due to his association with Vavar. As per the mythology associated with Vavar, Ayyappan confronted the robber Vavar in a jungle and defeated him. Later, he became Ayyappan's trusted lieutenant in the fight against other pirates and robbers. In another version, Vavar is stated to be a Muslim saint from Arabia, who worked with him. A mosque dedicated to Vavar stands next to the Kadutha swami shrine at the foothills of Sabarimala. Pilgrims often offer a prayer in both the shrines, before beginning the trek towards the hill. According to Kent, though the mosque near Sabarimala includes a grave, it does not contain the mortal remains of Vavar, and no one can date Vavar nor provide when and where he lived, so he may be a myth. The Vavar legend and palli shrines might reflect the Hindu approach to accepting and co-opting legendary figures or saints of other religions within its fold.

== Popular culture ==
A number of South Indian films have been made about Ayyappan. These include: Sabarimala Ayyappan (1961) by S. M. Sriramulu Naidu, Swami Ayyappan (1975) by P. Subramaniam, Saranam Ayyappa (1980) by Dasarathan, Arul Tharum Ayyappan (1987) by Dasarathan, Shiv Putra Swami Ayappa (1990) by P.S. Mani, Shabarimale Swamy Ayyappa (1990) by Renuka Sharma, Engal Swamy Ayyappan (1990) by Dasarathan, Ayyappa Swamy Mahatyam (1991) by K. Vasu, Ayyappa Deeksha Mahimalu (1992) by Guda Rama Krishna, Swami Ayappa Shabarimalai (1993) by K. Shankar, Jai Hari Hara Putra Ayyappa (1995), Bhagwaan Ayyappa (2007) by Irajaral Bhakhta and V. Swaminathan, Swami Ayyappan (2012) by Chetan Sharma and Mahesh Vettiyar, Om Sharanam Ayyappa (2015) by K. Sharath, Sri Omkara Ayyappane (2016) by Sai Prakash, Ayyappa Kataksham (2019) by Rudrapatla Venugopal and Malikappuram (2023) by Vishnu Mohan.

Asianet launched a Malayalam series named Swami Ayyappan in 2006. Other series include Swami Ayyappan Saram (2010), Sabarimala Shri Dharmashasta (2012), Sabarimala Swami Ayappan (2019) and Malikappuram: Apathbandhavan Ayyappan (2023). The story of Ayyappa is dictated by Parvati to Ganesha in the Indian TV show Vighnaharta Ganesha. The story of Ayyappan was adapted as a comic in the 673rd issue of the Indian comic book series, Amar Chitra Katha.

== See also ==
- Harihara
- Harivarasanam
- Maalikapurathamma
- Makara Jyothi
- Karuppuswamy
