= Pandalam dynasty =

Early dynasty in Kerala

Kingdom of Pandalam
- c. 903 CE (79 ME)–1820 CE (995 ME)
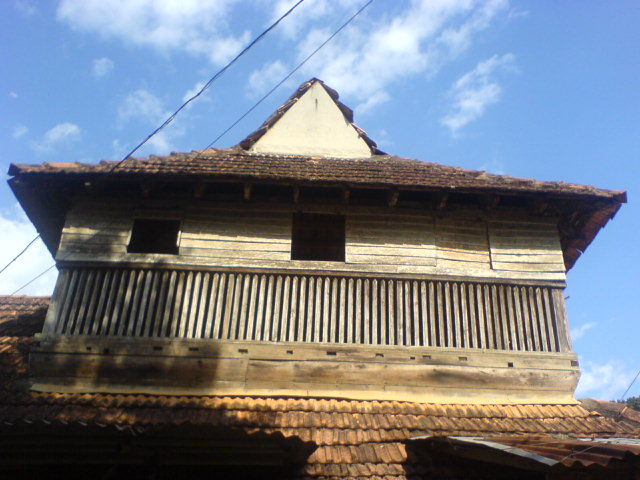
- Front view of the two-storeyed Pandalam Valiyakoyikkal palace
- Capital: Konni (for about 100 years); Pandalam (up to 1820 CE); Latitude: 9.2566° N Longitude: 76.7244° E
- Common languages: Malayalam; Tamil
- Religion: Hinduism87% Muslim6% Christian7%
- Government: Absolute Monarchy; Council of Ministers
  - Beginning of Kollam era: Raja Rajasekhara verma (Ayyappa's adopted father)
- Historical era: Kollam era
  - Established: c. 903 CE (79 ME)
  - Disestablished: 1820 CE (995 ME)

Area
  - Total: 3,000 km^{2} (1,200 sq mi)
- Currency: Panam; Kasu; Travancore Rupee
- Today part of: India

Pandalam dynasty (Malayalam:പന്തളം രാജവംശം,Tamil: பந்தளம் ராஜவம்சம்) was a royal dynasty which existed in Kerala during the Kollam era and emerged from a branch of Pandya kingdom.

The Pandalam kingdom was established around 79 ME (903 AD) by the Pandalam royal family who are the descendents of the Pandya kings of Madurai.

They came to Kerala fearing the assault of the Nayaks of Madurai. In Kerala they were given land and status by Kaipuzha Thampan (Kunjunni Varma Thampan) of Nilambur Kovilakam a landlord who lived in Amanthur Palace at Kaipuzha from Kottayam Kerala. Today Pandalam is part of Pathanamthitta, Kerala, India.

== Early history ==
One branch of the ruling dynasty of the Pandya Kingdom of Tamilakam settled in Valliyur (near Tirunelveli) and held a privileged position in the society.

== Legend about the relationship with Ayyappa ==
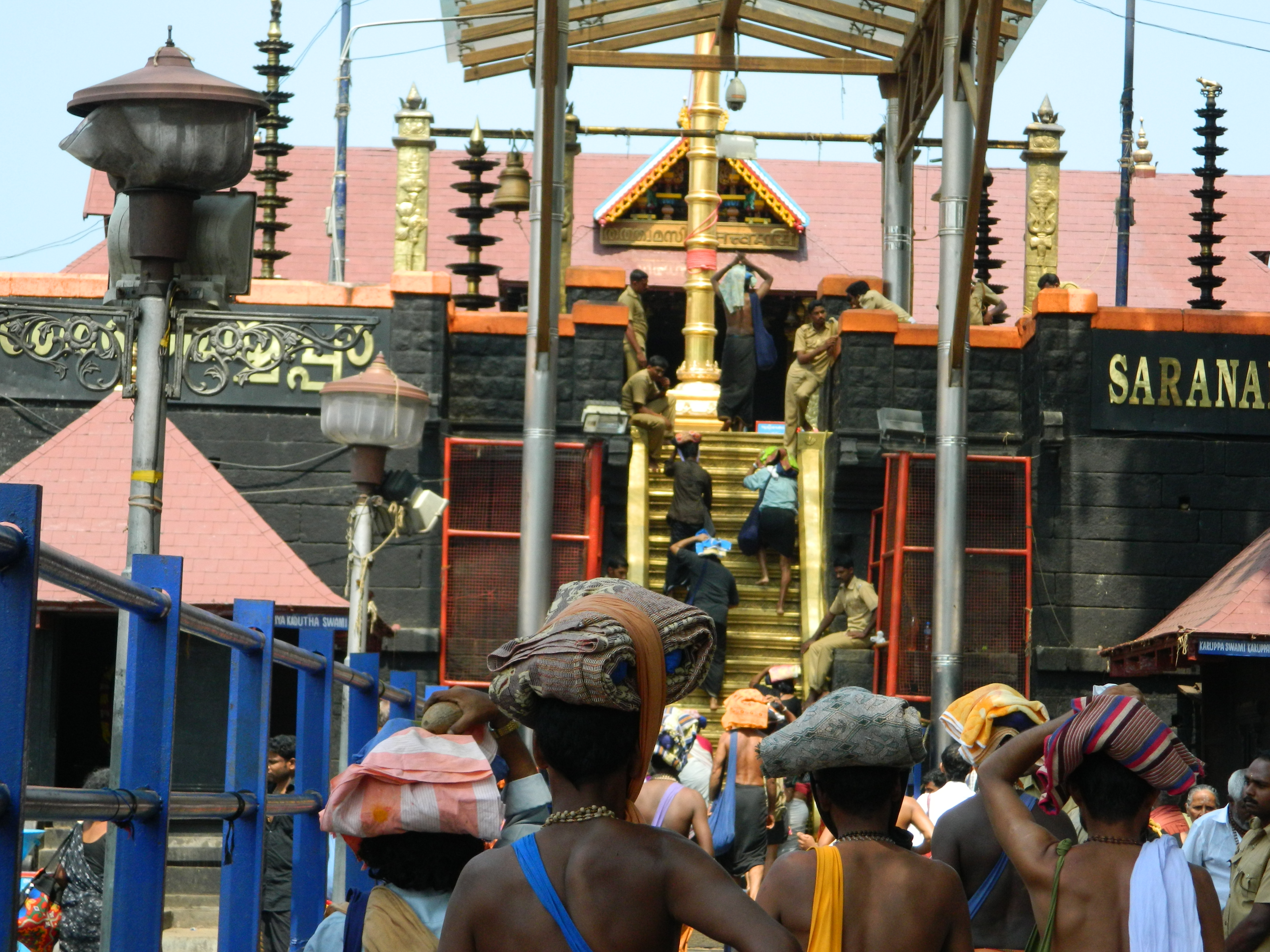
Sabarimala, the holy abode of Ayyappa

It is believed that the royal family of Pandalam belonged to the Bhargava gotra while other royal families in Kerala were included in the Viswamitra gotra. The kingdom is famed for its kinship with Ayyappa, the son of Harihara (the fusion of Shiva and Vishnu). Raja Rajasekhara, a king of this dynasty during his hunting expedition heard the crying of a baby near the banks of Pamba. The raja found a glorious looking infant wearing a bead in his neck and surrounded by a halo.

The childless raja was doubted whether to take the child with him. But Sage Agastya arrived there and cleared his doubts by telling him that the child is a boon from the Gods and advised him to accept him. He was named Manikanta (Mani means bead and Kanta being the neck). He was given proper education in gurukulam Later Rani gave birth to a son but raja considered Manikanta as his elder son and decided to crown him as Yuvaraja of Pandalam.

പാണ്ഡ്യേശ വംശതിലകം
കേരള കേളിവിഗ്രഹം
ആർത്തത്രാണപരം ദേവം
ശാസ്താരം പ്രണമാമ്യഹം

The above verses show the relationship of Lord Ayyappa with the Pandyan kingdom. He is often depicted as the Thilak (a mark on the forehead) of the Pandiya vamsa and the beloved deity of Kerala nadu.

== The Palace complex ==
Pandalam palace

Pandiyan / Pandalam Palace
- Location within Kerala

General information
- Status: Historical site
- Type: Royal Palace
- Architectural style: Traditional Kerala architecture and Pandiyan architecture
- Location: Kerala, Pandalam, India
- Coordinates: 9.32°N 76.73°E
- Affiliation: Pandalam dynasty

Technical details
- Material: wood, bamboo, mud, stone

Design and construction
- Developer: Pandalam rajas

(Malayalam: പന്തളം കൊട്ടാരം) is a royal palace of Pandalam located on the banks of Achankovil river was the residence of royal family members.

=== Valiyakoikkal temple ===
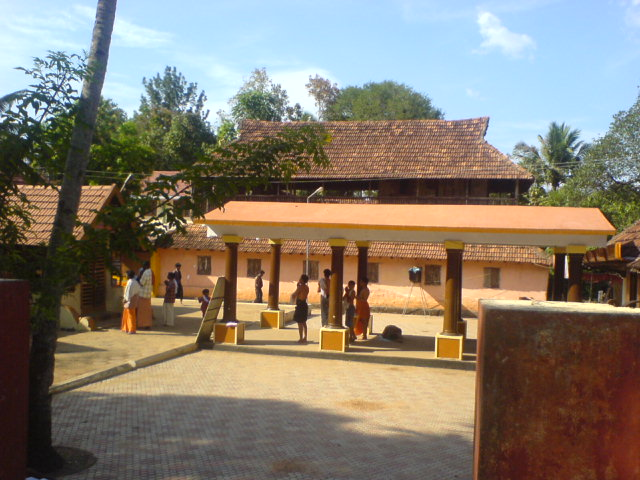
Pandalam Valiyakoikkal Sastha temple

The temple situated on the banks of Achankovil river was the family temple of Pandalam kingdom, built in the traditional architectural styles of Kerala. It was built by Rajasekhara raja after returning from Sabarimala for daily worships of Ayyappa. The shrine is placed within the palace premises. A Salagramam (sacred stone) is installed here instead of an idol. The holy Thiruvabharanam procession to Sabarimala begins from this temple every year on 28th of dhanu before the Makaravilakku festival hosted in the month of Makaram.

=== Kaipuzha temple ===
There are mainly two shrine in this complex, one for Shiva under the palace administration other for Krishna managed by Travancore devaswom board. The Navagraha (nine holy planets) sculptures are portrayed in the shrine of Krishna. Once the idol of Narasimha Murthy was installed in the temple which was very powerful. But due to the unfortunate incidents in the palace, the idol was replaced by the Santhana gopalam pratishta as per the instructions of astrologers and priests.

=== Thevarappuras (prayer rooms) ===
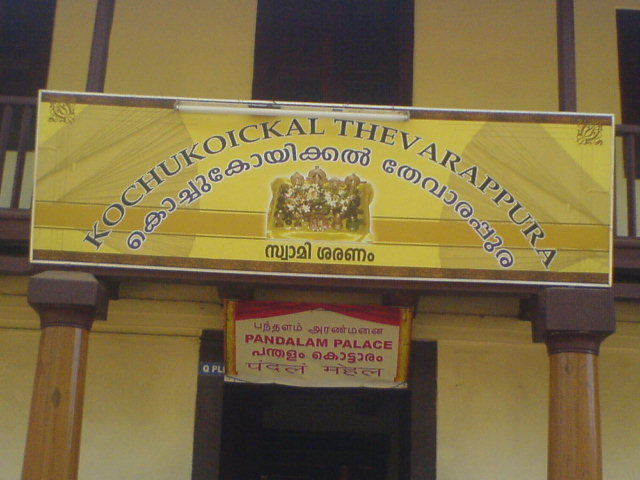
Kochukoikkal thevarappura

The prayer rooms or Thevarappuras of both Vadakkekottaram and Nalukettu palaces structured elegantly in wood are still in unblemished condition which keeps the idols of 28 gods and goddess for worshipping. The Pandiyan relation of Pandalam kingdom can easily be noticed from the presence of Minakshi amman idol.

== Notable personalities ==
The royal family of Pandalam has renowned artists, scholars and men of letters.

- Pandalam Kerala Varma is a writer. He wrote many narrative poems, translations, children's poetry and two mahakavyas. He served as the chief editor of "Kavana Kaumudi", the first Malayalam periodical.
- V.S. Valiathan (Vattaparambil Sankaran Valiathan) was born in the royal family of Pandalam as the son of Revathinal Ravi Varam Raja and Thottathil madhavi Amma. He is one of the noted artists from Kerala who followed the styles of Raja Ravi Varma.

== See also ==
- Poonjar dynasty
- Ayyappa
- Pandalam Palace
- Pandalam Kerala Varma
- Valiyakoikkal temple
- Pandya dynasty
- History of Kerala
- Thiruvabharanam
- Aranmula palace
- Malayalam calendar
