= Vavar =

Legendary figure from Kerala

Vavar (Malayalam pronunciation: [ʋaːʋər]), known reverently as Vavarswami, is a legendary figure from Kerala. He is traditionally believed to be a Muslim companion of the Hindu deity Ayyappan. Various legends describe Vavar’s origins, alternatively identifying him as an Arab sea raider, a revered Muslim mystic, a Syrian immigrant, or a warrior from the Pandya kingdom.

The story of Vavar's association with Ayyappan is a significant aspect of the region's spiritual history. A shrine dedicated to Vavar is located at Sabarimala, one of the most prominent pilgrimage sites in Kerala. Additionally, a mosque dedicated to Vavar is situated in Erumely, opposite an Ayyappan temple.

== Legend ==
There are many legends about Vavar and his association with Ayyappan. Vavar and his family migrated to the Pathanamthitta district area. The family later resorted to pirate activities to make a living. When Ayyappan defeated Vavar and his pirates, Vavar was impressed by the youth's valour and became the messenger of Lord Ayyappa and helped him in the wars in the mountainous region. As time passed, Vavar too became an ardent devotee of Ayyappa just like Kaduthaswami, and came to be known as Vavarswami. The old sword on the wall of the Vavar mosque symbolises the eminence of Vavar as a great warrior. It is believed that Lord Ayyappa himself instructed the King of the Pandya dynasty to build a mosque for Vavar at Erumely in Kottayam District. The Sabarimala shrine is about 50 km away, deep in the forest in Pathanamthitta district.

In another variation, when Ayyappan was looking for tiger milk, he encountered Vavar and became friends. Later, Vavar joined along with him to carry out his mission.

In another variation, Vavar is a Muslim saint who came to the region to spread Islam. He joined forces with Ayyappan to defeat the outlaws.

In another variation, Vavar belonged to Pandya Desam near Madurai and his family reportedly fled to the Travancore region to escape an assault by a Pandyan minister, where they subsequently met and befriended Ayyappan.

It is also believed that Vavar was born in Vaipur and the name of the village is derived from Vavar's oor( malayalam for village/place).

In 1950, Sabarimala thanthri Kantararu Shankararu testified before the Kerala High Court that Vavar was a Muslim, born to Pathumma and Seythali. He emphasized that his shrine at Erumely adheres to Islamic tradition by containing no idols.

== Vavar Palli and Vavarnada ==
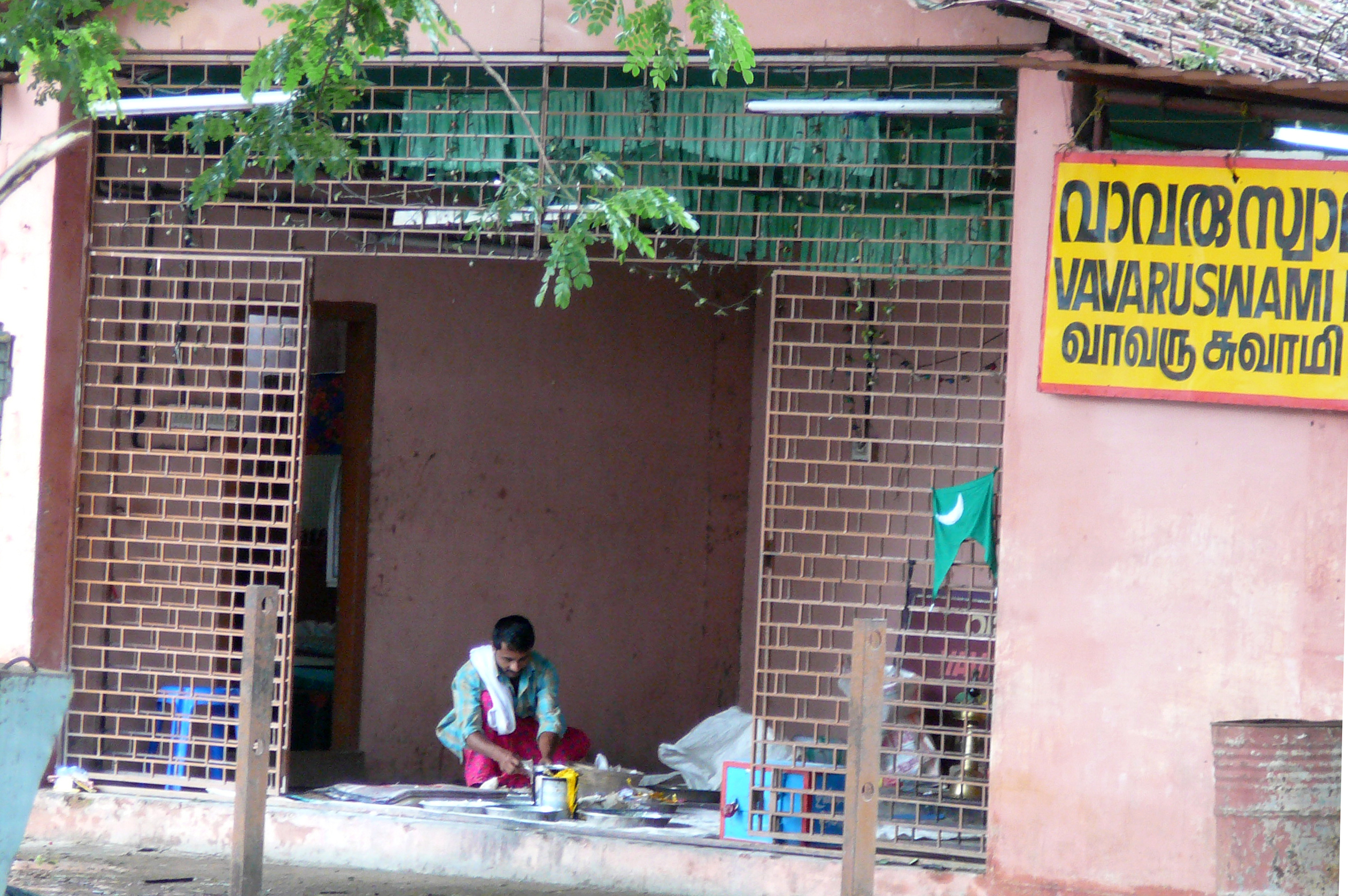
Vavarunada in Sabarimala

The Vavar Palli, also called the Erumeli Nainar Juma Masjid is dedicated to him. It is the place where Vavar is believed to have died. The shrine takecarers of the Vavar mosque are the Vettiplackal family, the descendants of Vavaruswamy.

Vavarnada is a shrine dedicated to Vavar in Sabarimala next to the main temple. As per Islamic teachings there is no idol, but just a carved stone slab symbolises the deity of Vavar. A green coloured silk cloth is hung across one of the three walls. The fourth side is open. An old sword is also kept near the wall. The main prasadam from the shrine consists of black pepper and rock sugar. These same items are given as offerings to Vavar as well. The prasadam is distributed in memory of Vavar, who is believed to have been a Siddha healer.

== See also ==
- Ayyanar
- Sabarimala
- Maalikapurathamma
