= Mohini =

Hindu goddess of enchantment, the only female avatar of Vishnu

- Goddess of Beauty, Seduction, Eroticism and Illusion
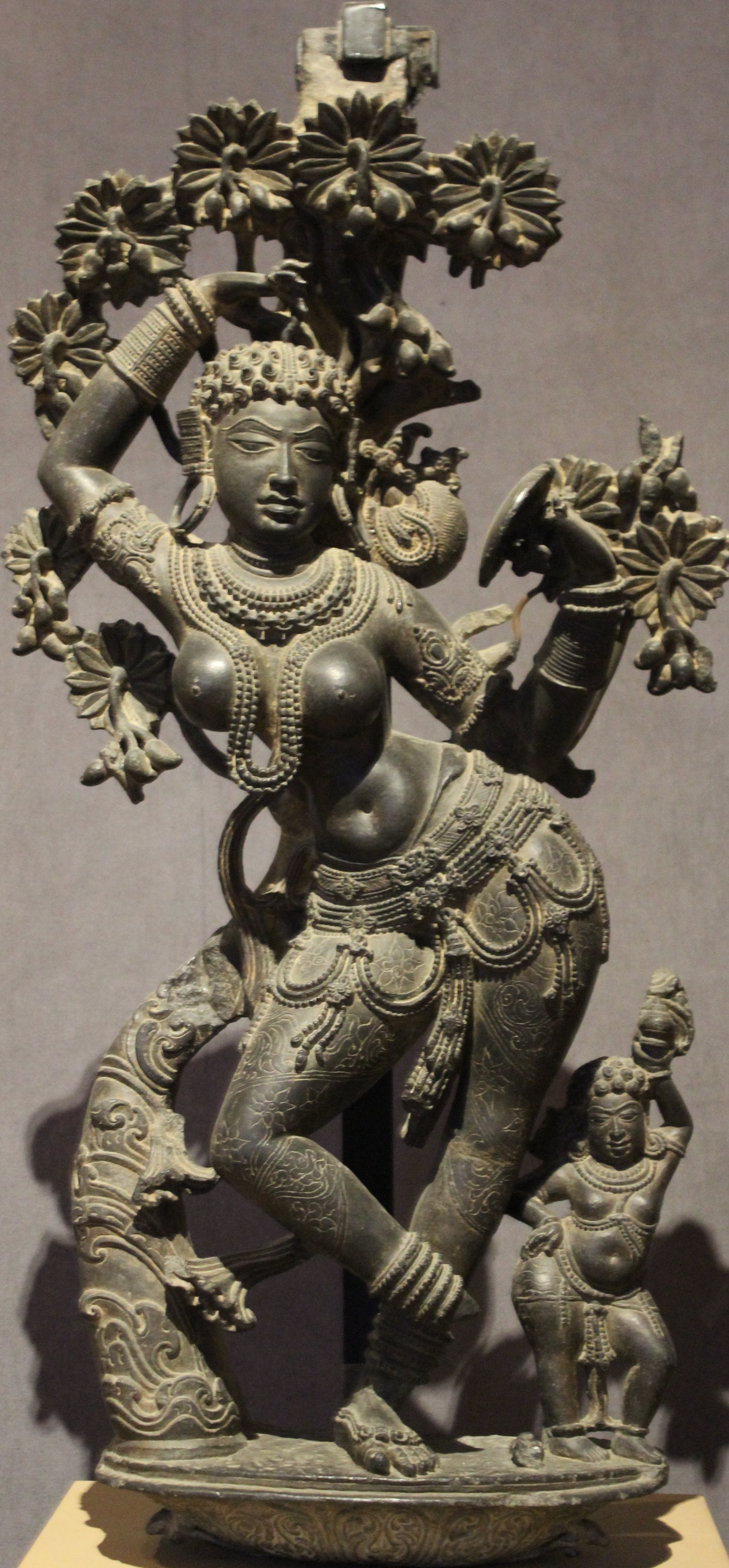
- A sculpture of Mohini at The National Museum, New Delhi
- Devanagari: मोहिनी
- Sanskrit transliteration: Mohinī
- Affiliation: Avatar of Vishnu
- Weapons: Mohini-Astra (Seduction), Sudarshana Chakra
- Gender: Female

Genealogy
- Children: Shasta

Mohini (Sanskrit: मोहिनी, Mohinī) is the Hindu goddess of enchantment. She is the only female avatar of the Hindu god Vishnu. She is portrayed as a femme fatale, an enchantress, who maddens lovers and demons, sometimes leading them to their doom. Mohini is introduced into Hinduism in the narrative epic of the Mahabharata. Here, she appears as a form of a Vishnu following the Churning of the Ocean, a mesmerising beauty who distributes the amrita (the elixir of immortality) to the weakened devas (gods) and depriving it to the dominant asuras (demons), allowing the former to defeat the latter with their newfound immortality.

Many different legends tell of her various exploits, including her famed encounter with the god Shiva. These tales relate, among other things, the birth of the god Shasta and the destruction of Bhasmasura, the ash-demon. Mohini's main modus operandi is to trick or beguile those she encounters. She is worshipped throughout Indian culture, but mainly in Western India, where temples are devoted to her in the form of Mhalsa.

== Etymology ==
The name Mohini comes from the verb root moha, meaning "to delude, enchant, perplex, or illusion," and literally means "delusion personified." In the Baiga culture of Central India, the word mohini means "erotic magic or spell." The name also has an implied connotation of "the essence of female beauty and allurement."

== Legends and history ==
=== The Amrita ===
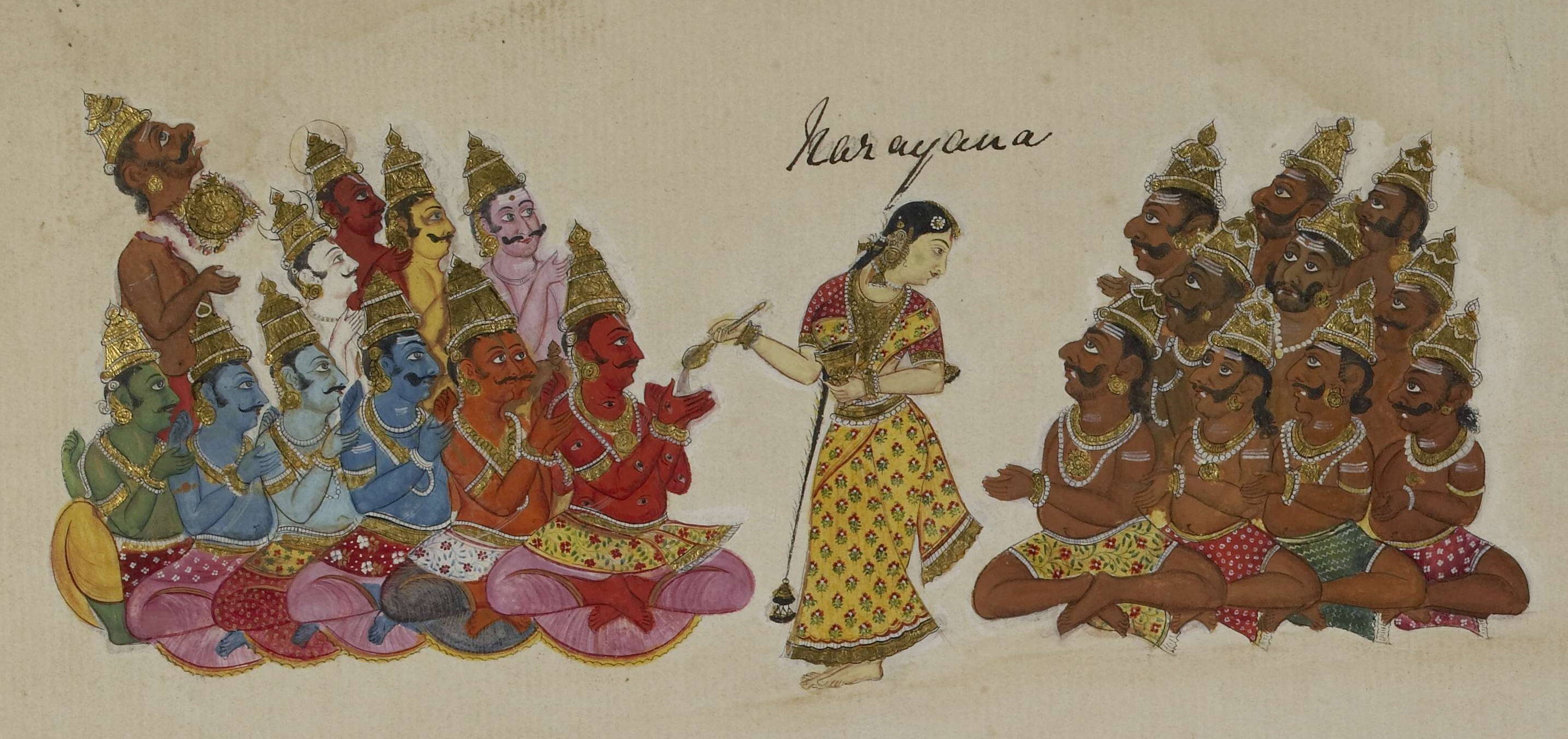
Mohini distributing the Amrita to the Devas (left), while the Asuras look on

Vishnu as Mohini carrying the amrita in the Kalighat style of painting, Cleveland Museum of Art

The earliest reference to a Mohini-type goddess appears in the Samudra Manthana episode of the 5th century BCE Hindu epic Mahabharata. The Amrita, or nectar of immortality, is produced by the churning of the Ocean of Milk. The Devas and the Asuras fight over its possession. The Asuras contrive to keep the Amrita for themselves, angering the Devas. Vishnu, wise to their plan, assumes the form of an "enchanting damsel". She uses her allure to trick the Asuras into giving her the Amrita, and then distributes it amongst the Devas. Rahu, an Asura, disguises himself as a god and tries to drink some Amrita himself. Surya (the sun-god) and Chandra (the moon-god) quickly inform Vishnu, and he uses the Sudarshana Chakra (the divine discus) to decapitate Rahu, leaving the head immortal. The other major Hindu epic, Ramayana (4th century BCE), narrates the Mohini story briefly in the Bala Kanda chapter. This same tale is also recounted in the Vishnu Purana four centuries later.

In the original text, Mohini is referred to as simply an enchanting, female form of Vishnu. In later versions, Mohini is described as the maya (illusion) of Vishnu. Later still, the name of the avatar becomes Mohini from the original phrase describing his deliberate false appearance (mayam ashito mohinim). Once the Mohini legend became popular, it was retold, revised, and expanded in several texts. The tales of Mohini-Vishnu also increased among devotional circles in various regions. The same expanded Mahabharata version of the story is also recounted in the Bhagavata Purana in the 10th century CE. Here, Mohini becomes a formal avatar of Vishnu.

This legend is also retold in the Padma Purana. and Brahmanda Purana. In the Brahmanda Purana, however, Vishnu-Mohini simply, after meditation upon the Great Goddess Maheshvari, acquires her form to trick the thieving asuras.

=== Slayer of demons ===
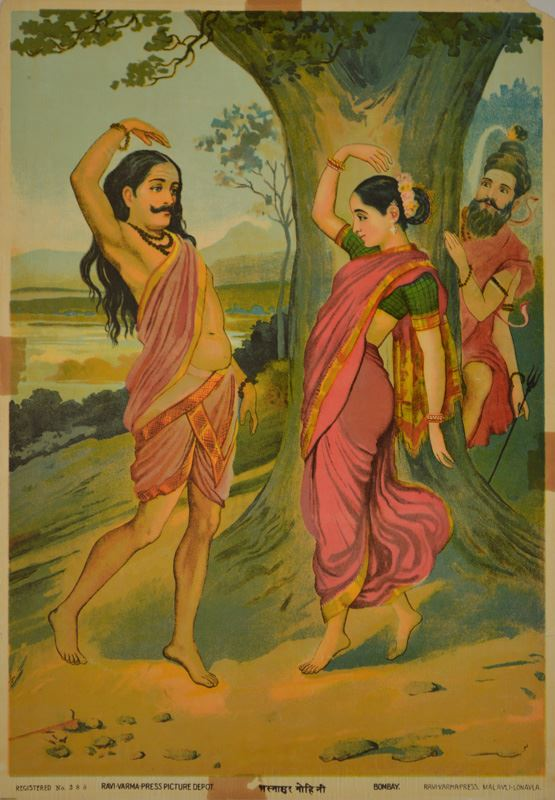
Bhasmasura-Mohini by Raja Ravi Varma. Bhasmasura (left) is about to place his hand on his head following the dancing Mohini (centre), as Shiva (right) looks from behind the tree.

Mohini also has an active history in the destruction of demons throughout Hindu texts. In the Vishnu Purana, Mohini defeats Bhasmasura, the "ash-demon". Bhasmasura invokes the god Shiva by performing severe penances. Shiva, pleased with Bhasmasura, grants him the power to turn anyone into ashes by touching their head. The demon decides to try the power on Shiva himself. Shiva requests Vishnu for help and Vishnu transforms into Mohini and charms Bhasmasura. Bhasmasura is so taken by Mohini that he asks her to marry him. Mohini agrees, but only on the condition that Bhasmasura follows her move for move in a dance. In the course of the dance, she places her hand on her head. Bhasmasura mimics the action, and in turn, reduces himself to ashes. The legend of Bhasmasura is retold in the Buddhist text Satara Dewala Devi Puvata, with a slight variation. In this tale, Vishnu assumes his female form (the name "Mohini" is not used) and charms Bhasmasura. The female Vishnu asks Bhasmasura to promise never to leave her by placing his hand on his head as per the usual practice to swear on one's head. On doing so, Bhasmasura is reduced to ashes.

In a similar legend related to the birth of Ayyappa, the demon Surpanaka earns the power to turn anyone into ashes by his austerities. The tale mirrors all other aspects of the Buddhist version of the Bhasmasura tale, where he is forced by Mohini to severe fidelity by keeping his hand on his head and is burnt.

The prelude of the Ramakien, the Thai version of the Ramayana, the demon Nontok is charmed and killed by Mohini-Vishnu. Nontok misuses a divine weapon given to him by Shiva. The four-armed Mohini-Vishnu enchants Nontok and then attacks him. In his last moments, the demon accuses Vishnu of foul play saying that Vishnu first seduced him and then attacked him. Vishnu decrees that in his next birth, Nontok will be born as the ten-headed demon Ravana and Vishnu will be a mortal man called Rama. He will then fight him and defeat him.

In a lesser-known tale in the Ganesha Purana (900–1400 CE) the wise asura king Virochana is rewarded a magical crown by the sun-god Surya. The crown shields him against all harm. Vishnu as Mohini then enchants Virochana and steals his crown. The demon, thus unprotected, is killed by Vishnu.

Another South Indian legend about the demon Araka associates Mohini with Krishna (an avatar of Vishnu) rather than the god himself. The demon Araka had become virtually invincible because he had never laid eyes on a woman (extreme chastity). Krishna takes the form of the beautiful Mohini and marries him. After three days of marriage, Araka's bonds of chastity are broken, and Krishna kills him in battle. Transgender Hijras consider Krishna-Mohini to be a transsexual deity.

=== Relationship with Shiva ===
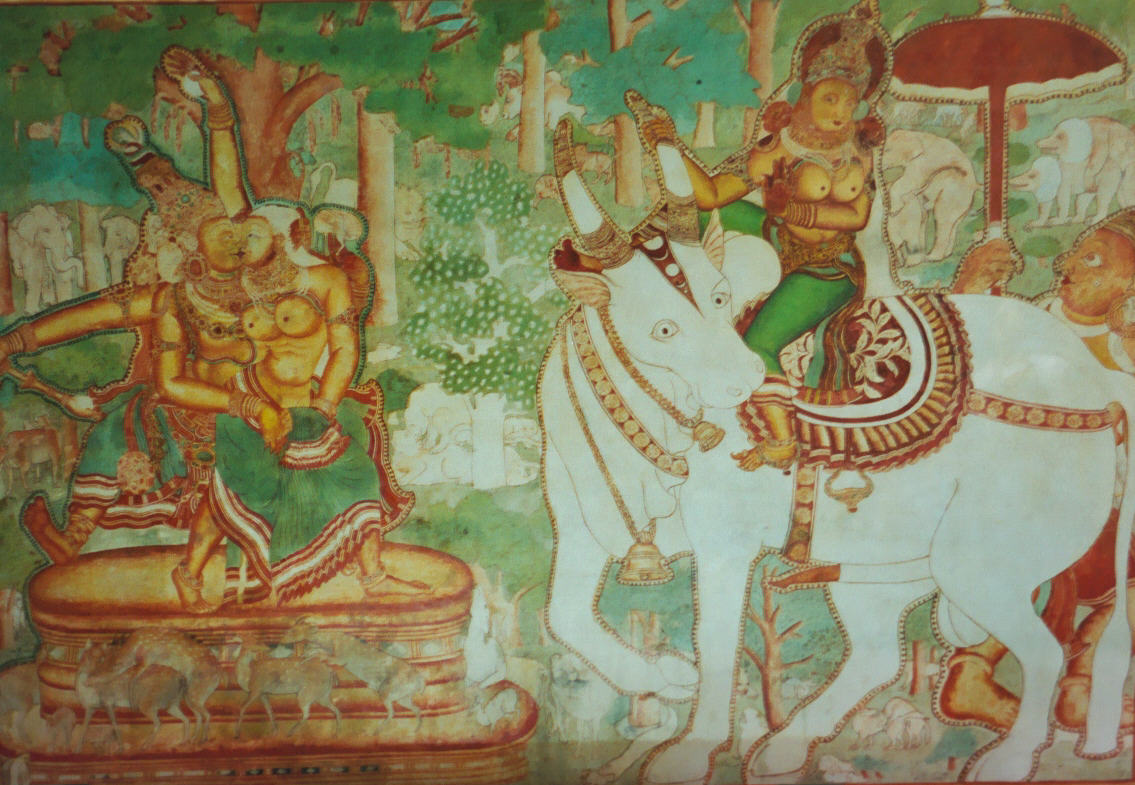
A Mattancherry palace mural shows Shiva and Mohini in an embrace while Parvati seated on Nandi, the white bull, looks at them in distaste.

In the Bhagavata Purana, after Vishnu assumes the enchanting form of Mohini to deceive the asuras (demons) and distribute the nectar of immortality, Shiva travels to Vaikuntha and requests to see this female manifestation. Upon seeing Mohini, Shiva is temporarily overcome by Kama (desire) and becomes completely bewildered. He pursues Mohini while his wife, Parvati, looks on. During this pursuit, Shiva's seed falls to the ground, which is said to have created ores of silver and gold. Eventually, Shiva regains his composure and realizes he was deluded by the Lord Vishnu's divine illusion. Vishnu then consoles him, explaining that his illusory energy is nearly impossible for even the greatest ascetics to overcome. Recognizing this, Shiva praises the insurmountable power of Vishnu's Maya.

The Tripurarahasya, a south Indian Shakta text, retells the story, giving more importance to the Goddess. When Shiva wishes to see Vishnu's Maya Mohini form again, Vishnu fears that he may be burned to ashes like Kamadeva by the supreme ascetic Shiva. So, Vishnu prays to goddess Tripura, who grants half of her beauty to Vishnu, begetting the Mohini-form. As Shiva touches Mohini, his seed spills, indicating a loss of the merit gained through of all his austerities.

In the Brahmanda Purana when the wandering sage Narada tells Shiva about Vishnu's form Mohini that deluded the demons, Shiva dismisses him. Shiva and his wife Parvati go to Vishnu's home. Shiva asks him to take on the Mohini form again so he can see the actual transformation for himself. Vishnu smiles, again meditates on the Goddess and transforms himself into Mohini. Overcome by desire, Shiva chases Mohini as Parvati hangs her head in shame and envy. Shiva grabs Mohini's hand and embraces her, but Mohini frees herself and runs further. Finally, Shiva grabs her and their coupling leads to the discharge of Shiva's seed which falls on the ground and the god Maha-Shasta ("The Great Chastiser") is born. Mohini disappears, while Shiva returns home with Parvati.

Shasta is identified primarily with two regional deities: Ayyappa from Kerala and the Tamil Aiyanar. He is also identified with the classical Hindu gods Skanda and Hanuman. In the later story of the origin of Ayyappa, Shiva impregnates Mohini, who gives birth to Ayyappa. They abandon Ayyappa, who is born to kill Mahishi, and the child was found by a king who raised him. Another variant says that instead of a biological origin, Ayyappa sprang from Shiva's semen, which he ejaculated upon embracing Mohini. Ayyappa is referred to as Hariharaputra, "the son of Vishnu (Hari) and Shiva (Hara)", and grows up to be a great hero. Another tale says after Surpanaka's destruction, Shiva wishes to see Mohini and mesmerized by her looks, has union with her resulting in the birth of Ayyapppa.

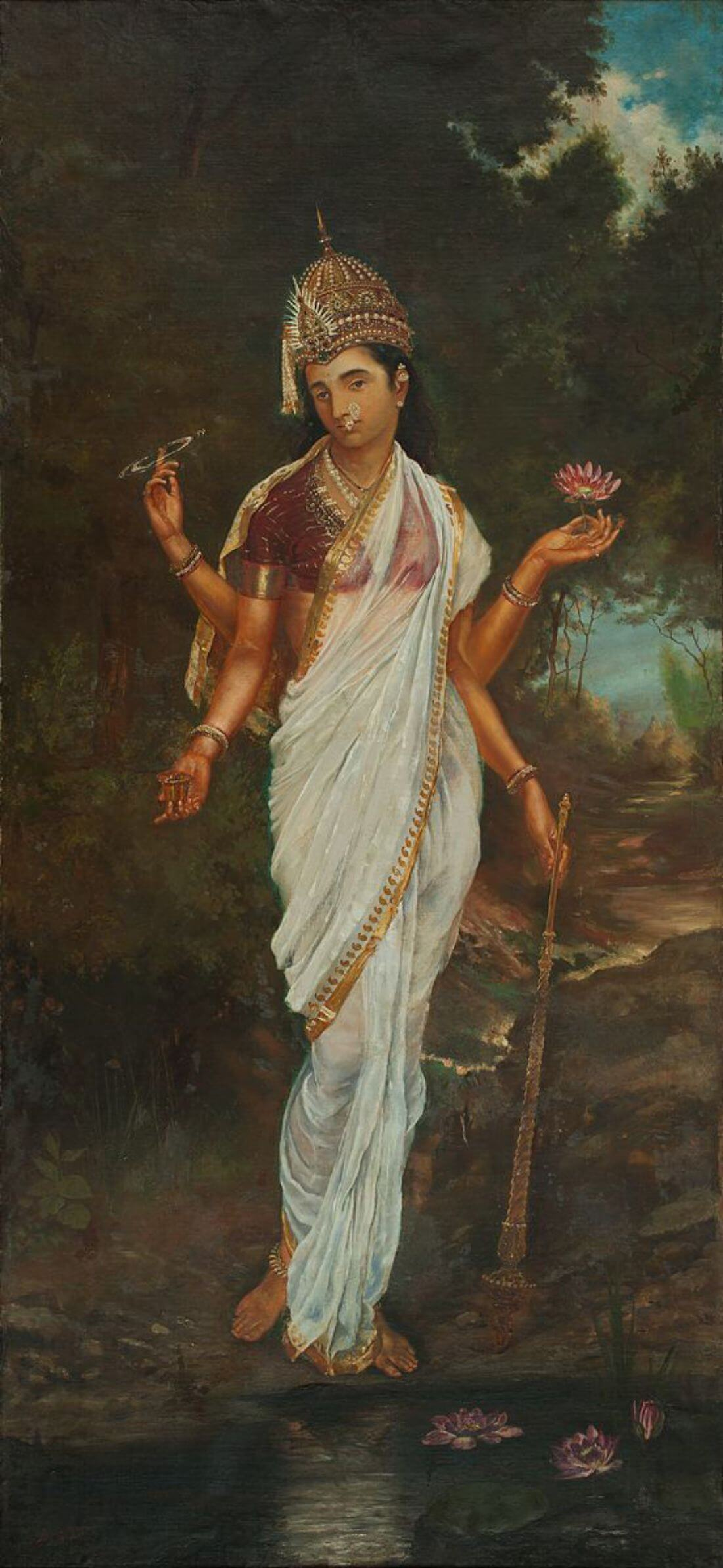
Narayani-Mohini by M. V. Dhurandhar. The painting depicts Mohini as a goddess with iconographical attributes reminiscent of Vishnu.

The Tamil text Kanda Puranam narrates about the birth of Shasta identified with Aiyanar. The text tells just before the tale that Vishnu is Shiva's Shakti (wife and power) Parvati in a male form. The legend begins with Shiva's request and Vishnu's agreement to show his illusionary Mohini form, that he assumed for the distribution of amrita. Shiva falls in love with Mohini and proposes a union with her. Mohini-Vishnu declines saying that union of two men was unfruitful. Shiva informs Mohini-Vishnu that he was one of the forms of his Shakti ("female consort"). Thereafter, their union resulted in the birth of a dark boy with red locks, who was named Hariharaputra. Further, he was also known as Shasta and Aiyannar.

In the Agni Purana, as the enchanted Shiva follows Mohini, drops of his semen fall on the ground and become lingas, Shiva's symbols. His seed also generates the monkey-god Hanuman, who helps Vishnu's avatar Rama in his fight against Ravana in the Ramayana. The Shiva Purana says that by the mere glimpse of Mohini, Shiva spurts out his seed. The seed was collected and poured into the ear of Añjanā, who gave birth to Hanuman, the incarnation of Shiva. The latter is retold in the Thai and Malaysian version of the Ramayana. Though Hanuman springs from Shiva's seed, he is also considered as a combined son of Vishnu and Shiva.

The Buddhist version of the Bhasmasura tale continues with Shiva (Ishvara) asking the female-Vishnu, who is seated on a swing, to marry him. She asks Shiva to get the permission of his wife Umayangana to take her home. Shiva returns with Umayangana's consent to find the female-Vishnu pregnant, who sends him back to get permission to bring a pregnant woman home. When he returns, a child is born and female-Vishnu is pregnant again. She requests Shiva to seek approval to bring a pregnant woman with a child home. This happens six more times. Finally, Shiva brings Umayangana with him to witness the miraculous woman. Vishnu then returns to his male form. Umayangana embraces the six youngest children merging them into the six-headed Skanda, while the eldest, named Aiyanayaka ("eldest brother") remains intact. Aiyanayaka is identified with Aiyanar.

The rare instance where an "explicit, male homosexual act" is suggested is found in a Telugu text. In this version, when Shiva is copulating with Mohini, Mohini reverts to Vishnu. Shiva, unable to differentiate because of the naturally curvaceous form of Vishnu, who was also still unclad, continued copulating.

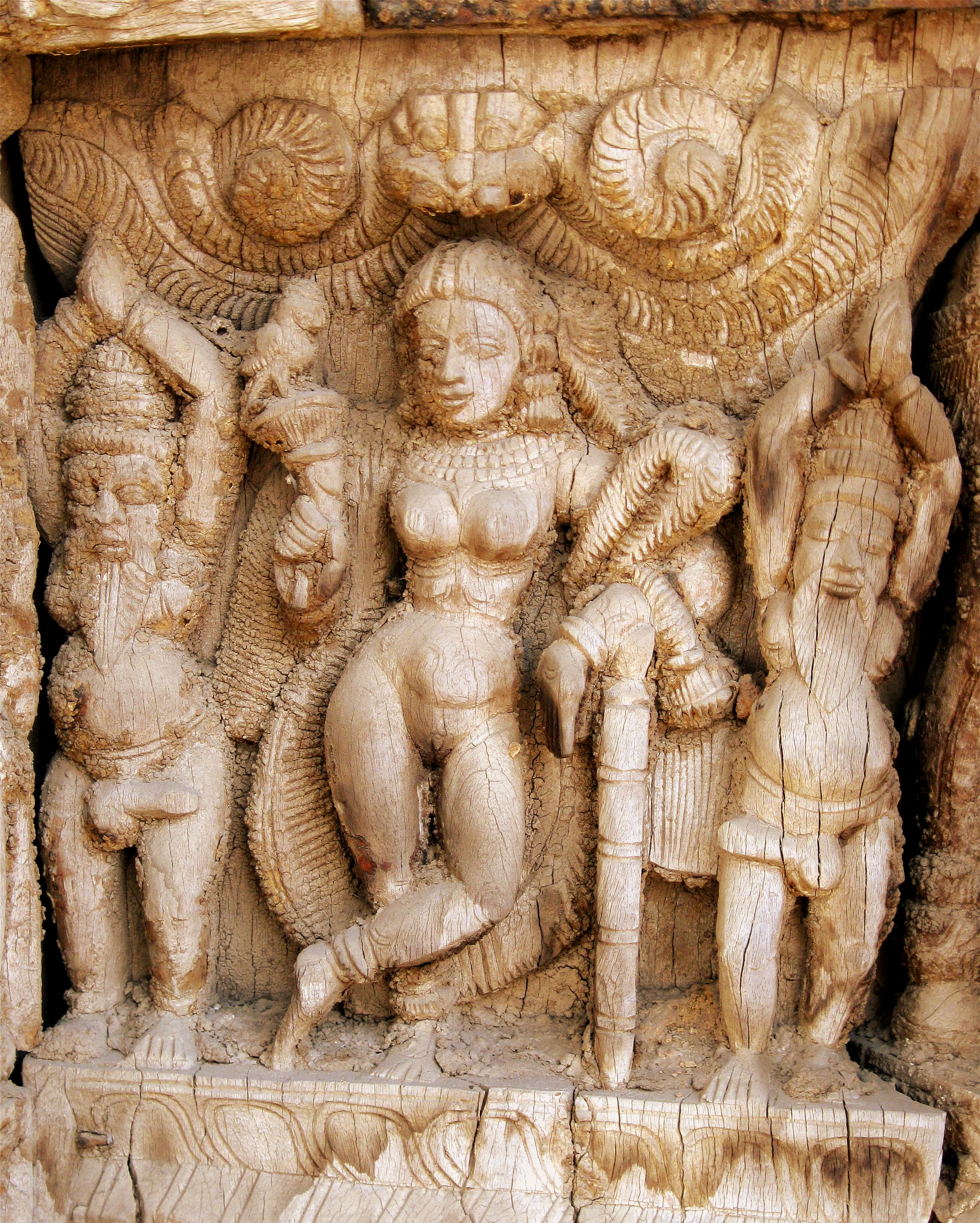
Mohini seduces the sages. Mohini is depicted nude, adorned with garlands and ornaments, holding a lotus and a parrot, leaning on a stick. The sages pray to her, as their phalluses point to her.

Mohini plays a lesser role in a Shaiva legend in the Skanda Purana. Here, Vishnu as Mohini joins Shiva to teach a lesson to arrogant sages. A group of sages are performing rituals in a forest, and start to consider themselves as gods. To humble them, Shiva takes the form of an attractive young beggar (Bhikshatana) and Vishnu becomes Mohini, his wife. While the sages fall for Mohini, their women wildly chase Shiva. When they regain their senses, they perform a black magic sacrifice, which produces a serpent, a lion, an elephant (or tiger) and a dwarf, all of which are overpowered by Shiva. Shiva then dances on the dwarf and takes the form of Nataraja, the cosmic dancer. The legend is retold in the Tamil Kovil Puranam and Kandha Puranam with some variation. This legend is also told in the Sthala Purana related to the Chidambaram Temple dedicated to Shiva-Nataraja.

Another legend from the Linga Purana says that the embrace of enchanted Shiva with Mohini led to the merging of their bodies into one. In that moment, Mohini reverts to Vishnu resulting in the composite deity Harihara, whose right side of the body is Shiva and left side is Vishnu. The temple at Sankarnayinarkovil, near Kalugumalai, has one of the rarest exceptions to iconography of Harihara (Sankara-Narayana). The deity is depicted similar to the Ardhanari, the composite form of Shiva-Parvati, where right side of the body is the male Shiva and left side is female. Here, the image's female side represents Mohini and, together, it symbolizes the union of Shiva with Mohini. In a Harihara image, the Shiva's half has an erect phallus (urdhva linga) and relates to Shiva's love to his left side Vishnu-Mohini. The influence of Shakta traditions on Shaiva ones may have led to the development of Harihara, where Vishnu is identified as Shiva's consort, or Mohini. As it is in Kanda Puranam, the Shaiva saint Appar identifies Vishnu as Parvati (Uma), the female counterpart of Shiva.

== Other legends ==
A South Indian folktale tells of the Mahabharata hero Aravan (who becomes the Tamil god Kuttantavar), who was married to Mohini, before his self-sacrifice. Aravan agrees to become the sacrificial victim for the Kalappali ("sacrifice to the battlefield") to ensure the victory of the Pandavas, his father, and his uncles. Before being sacrificed to goddess Kali, Aravan asks three boons from Krishna, the guide of the Pandavas. The third boon was that Aravan should be married before the sacrifice so that he could get the right of cremation and funerary offerings (bachelors were buried). This third boon, however, is found only in the folk cults. To fulfill this wish in the Kuttantavar cult myth, Krishna turns into Mohini, marries Aravan and spends the night with him. Then after the sacrifice, Mohini laments Aravan's death, breaking her bangles, beating her breasts, and discarding her bridal finery. She then returns to the original form of Krishna. The legend of the marriage of Aravan and Krishna in his female form as Krishna, and Mohini-Krishna's widowhood after Aravan's sacrifice, forms the central theme of an eighteen-day annual festival in the Tamil month of Cittirai (April–May) at Koovagam. The marriage ceremony is re-enacted by transgender Hijras, who play the role of Mohini-Krishna.

== Cultural interpretation ==
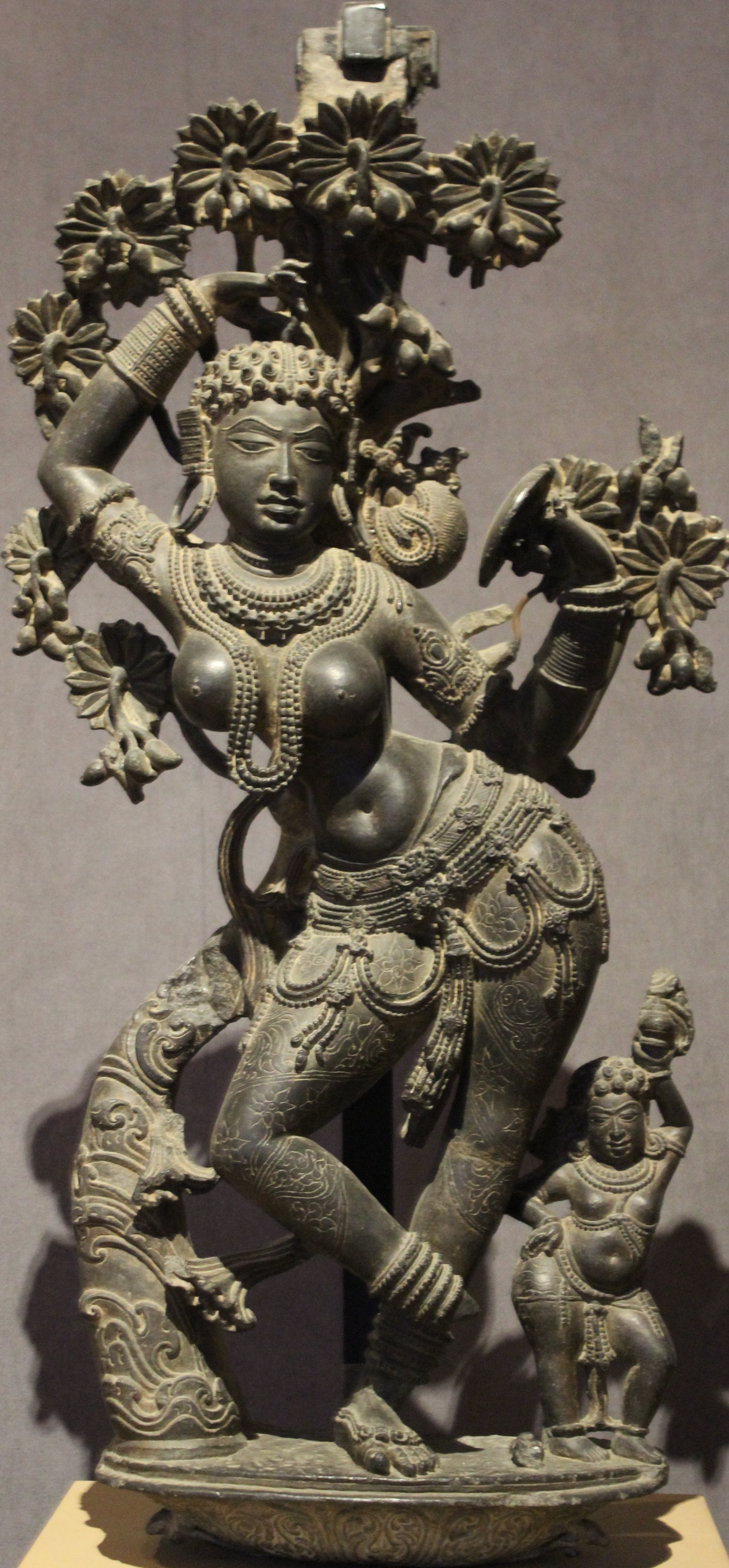
A sculpture of Mohini at The National Museum, New Delhi

According to mythologist Pattanaik, Mohini is just a disguise to delude the demon Bhasmasura, rather than a sexual transformation in this legend. Mohini is a disillusion, Vishnu's maya.

Stories in which Shiva knows of Mohini's true nature have been interpreted to "suggest the fluidity of gender in sexual attraction". Pattanaik writes while Westerners may interpret the Shiva-Mohini union as homosexual, traditional Hindus do not agree to this interpretation. He also writes that those focusing only on homoeroticism miss the narrative's deeper metaphysical significance: Mohini's femininity represents the material aspect of reality, and Mohini's seduction is another attempt to induce the ascetic Shiva into taking an interest in worldly matters. Only Vishnu has the power to "enchant" Shiva; a demon who tried to enchant and hurt Shiva in form of a woman was killed in the attempt.

Another interpretation posits that the Mohini tale suggests that Vishnu's maya blinds even supernatural beings. Mohini is "the impersonation of the magically delusive nature of existence which fetters all beings to the rounds of births and deaths and vicissitudes of life." Mohini also does not have an independent existence; she exists only as a temporary delusion, and is absorbed back into Vishnu after serving her purpose.

The legend of the union of Mohini-Vishnu and Shiva may also be written as part of the desire to have a common child of the two cosmic patriarchs of Hinduism.

== Worship ==
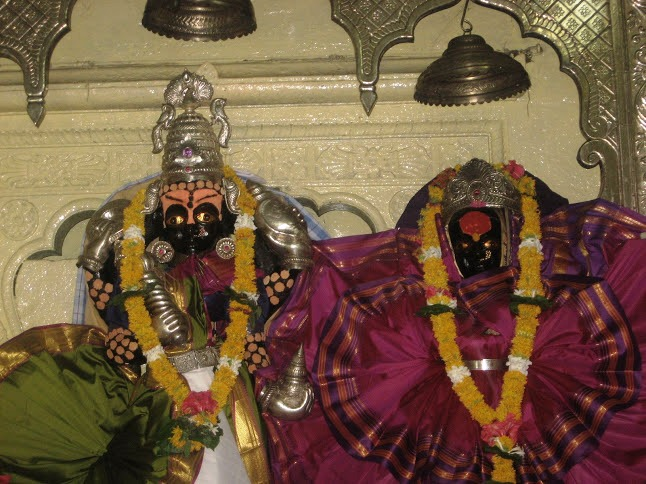
Vishnu (left) as Mohini with his consort Lakshmi, Nevasa.

On the fifth day of Brahmotsavam, Venkateshwara is dressed as Mohini and paraded in a grand procession.

In Goa, Mohini is worshipped as Mahalasa or Mahalasa Narayani. She is the kuladevi (family goddess) of many Hindus from western and southern India, including Goud Saraswat Brahmins, Karhade Brahmins, Daivajnas and Bhandaris. The chief temple of Mahalasa Narayani is at Mardol, Goa, though her temples also exist in the states of Karnataka, Kerala, Maharashtra, and Gujarat. Mahalasa has four hands, carrying a Trishula, a sword, a severed head, and a drinking bowl. She stands on a prostrate man or demon, as a tiger or lion licks blood dripping from the severed head. Goud Saraswat Brahmins as well as Vaishnavas from Goa and South Canara identify her with Mohini and call her Narayani and Rahu-matthani, the slayer of Rahu, as told in the Bhavishya Purana.

Mahalasa is also called Mhalsa, the consort of Khandoba, a local incarnation of Shiva. As the consort of Khandoba, her chief temple - the Mohiniraj temple - is located at Nevasa, where she is worshiped as a four-armed goddess and identified with Mohini. Mhalsa is often depicted with two arms and accompanying Khandoba on his horse or standing besides him.

The central icon of the Jaganmohini-Kesava Swany temple at Ryali, discovered buried underground by the king in the 11th century, represents the male Vishnu in the front, while the back of the icon is the female Jagan-Mohini ("one who deludes the world") or Mohini, with a female hairstyle and figure. Sthala Purana tells that the flower in Mohini's hair fell at Ryali ("fall" in Telugu) when Mohini was being chased by Shiva.

Ariyannur in Kerala's Thrissur district is the site of the ancient Harikanyaka Temple. Here, Mohini is present as 'Hari Kanyaka', that is, the virgin form of the goddess. Religious iconography shows a four-armed deity, holding the conch and discus in the upper arms, the pot of nectar (amrita) in her lower right hand, with the lower left arm placed on her waist. This temples is regarded to have been built by Perumthachan, Kerala's legendary architect, and had authority over thirty two of the surrounding temples. Famed for its intricate sculptures, murals, and craftsmanship, it is currently a protected monument under the Archeological Survey of India.

Chemmanadu Sri Krishna Garuda Mahavishnu Temple, situated in Tiruvaniyoor in Kerala's Ernakulam district is another temple in the state where Mohini is worshiped.

== Customs and ceremonies ==
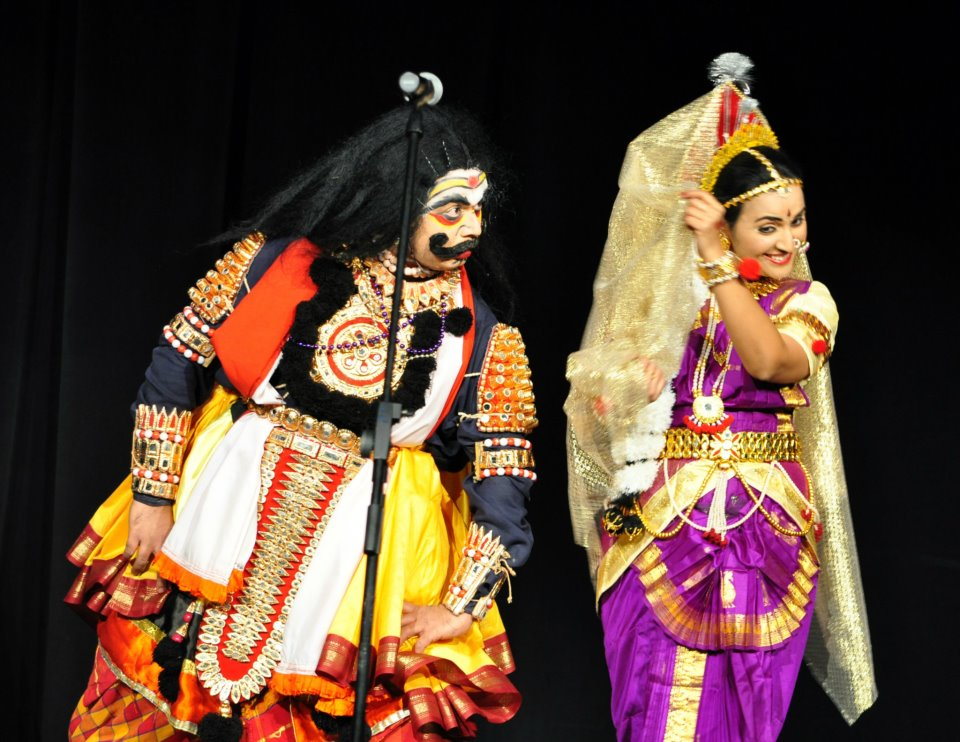
Bhasmasura and Mohini as depicted in Yakshagana

Mohini has an important, dramatic role in several mythical works of South Indian drama like Yakshagana and Kathakali. In Kerala, however, where Mohini's son Ayyappa is popular, the Mohiniattam ("the dance of Mohini") is honored as an independent dance form. Named after the goddess, it is a dance meant exclusively for women and "an ideal example of the erotic form." The origins of Mohiniattam form are unknown, though it was popularized in the 1850s, but later banned as it was used by "loose women" to attract customers. The ban was lifted in 1950, after which it has seen a renewal.

The legends of Mohini are also being depicted in other dances, including the modern Kathak. The Sonal Nati, performed in the Saho area of Chamba district, Himachal Pradesh, retells the Mohini-Bhasmasura tale, and hence is known as the Mohini-Bhasmasura dance. It is performed on festive occasions, especially in the Saho fair held in Baisakh in the precincts of the Chandershekhar temple.
