= Entry of women to Sabarimala =

Dispute involving a temple in Kerala, India

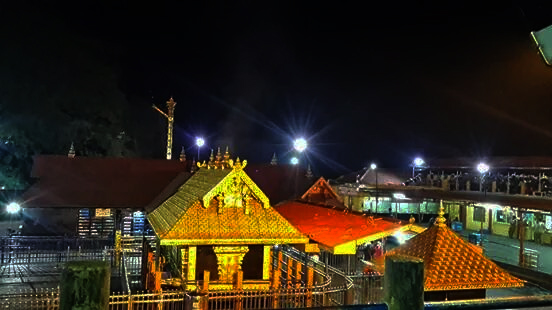
Women and girls between 10 and 50 years of age were legally banned from entering Sabarimala from 1991 to 2018.

Sabarimala Temple is a Hindu temple dedicated to Shasta, located in Pathanamthitta District, Kerala, India. Women and girls of reproductive age have traditionally not been permitted to worship there, as Shasta is a celibate deity. In 1991, the Kerala High Court upheld this practice, and from then on, women and girls between the ages of 10 and 50 were legally barred from entering the temple.

In September 2018, a landmark judgement of the Supreme Court of India ruled that all Hindu pilgrims, regardless of gender, could enter the temple. The Constitution bench of the Supreme Court held that "any exception placed on women because of biological differences violates the Constitution." Specifically, the court held that the ban violated the right to equality under Article 14 and the right to freedom of religion under Article 25.

This verdict led to protests by millions of Ayyappan devotees who opposed the verdict. A month later, about ten female activists attempted to enter the temple despite threats of physical assault but they were unsuccessful. On 2 January 2019, two women successfully entered the temple through a rear gate, prompting priests to close the shrine temporarily for "purification rituals". Sabarimala Reference Hearing is ongoing in the Supreme Court starting from 15 April 2026.

== Legend ==
Many legends exist about the god Ayyappan and the creation of the temple.

One legend concerns Ayyappan, the celibate deity of Sabarimala Temple, and the evil demoness Mahishi whom he defeated in battle. Mahishi had been cursed to live the life of a demon until the child born to Shiva and Vishnu defeated her in a battle. Ayyappan, the abandoned son of Shiva and Mohini (a female incarnation of Vishnu), could therefore set her free after defeating her. She transformed into a beautiful woman after her defeat. After the battle, the young woman proposed marriage to Ayyappan. However, he refused, explaining that he had been ordained to go to the forest, live the life of a brahmachari and answer the prayers of devotees. However, the young woman was persistent, so Ayyappan promised to marry her the day "kanni-swamis," or new devotees, stopped visiting Sabarimala Temple. Sabarimala was visited by kanni-swamis every year, and she was not able to marry Ayyappan. The woman is worshipped as the goddess Maalikapurathamma at a neighbouring temple.

== History ==
According to the Memoir of the Survey of the Travancore and Cochin States, women of reproductive age had been denied entry to the Sabarimala temple since at least the 19th century. Lieutenants Benjamin Swain Ward and Peter Eyre Conner, who completed the survey at the end of 1820, reported that, at the time, "Old women and young girls may approach the temple, but those who have attained the age of puberty and to a certain time in life are forbidden to approach, as all sexual intercourse in that vicinity is averse to this deity (Lord Ayyappa)."

Before 1991, when the Kerala High Court forbade the entry of women to Sabarimala, many women had visited the temple, although mostly for non-religious reasons. There are records of women pilgrims visiting the temple to conduct the first rice-feeding ceremony of their children (called Chorounu) at the temple premises. On 13 May 1940, even the Maharani of Thiruvithamkoor visited the temple. In 1986, when young actresses Jayashree, Sudha Chandran, Anu, Vadivukkarasi and Manorama danced near the deity at the pathinettam padi (18 steps) for the Tamil movie Nambinar Keduvathillai, a fine of ₹1,000 (US$10) was imposed on each of the actresses and the director. The Devaswom Board, which maintains the temple and premises, was also fined ₹7,500 (US$78), because it had given the director permission to film at Sabarimala. Former Karnataka minister Jayamala has also claimed to have entered Sabarimala and touched the idol in 1986, when she was a young woman.

In 1990, the Chorounu ceremony for the granddaughter of a former Devaswom commissioner was held at Sabarimala in the presence of female relatives. Following the court case S. Mahendran v. The Secretary, Travancore, the high court of Kerala prohibited women and girls between ages 10 and 50 from entering Sabarimala. In 1995, the district collector Valsala Kumari, aged 42, visited the Sabarimala shrine (although she did not climb the pathinettam padi to the inner sanctum) under special permission. Her goal was to obtain first-hand information about the conditions at the temple in connection with her official duties. In doing so, she was the first woman recognised as legitimate by the temple's authorities. In the same year, the local press reported that two young women, possibly wives of VIPs, had entered the shrine despite police oversight. In January 2018, temple authorities made it mandatory for female devotees to provide proof of their age when visiting Sabarimala.

=== Kerala High Court verdict ===
In 1990, S. Mahendran started a legal petition on the notion that young women were visiting Sabarimala. The verdict was announced in 1991, when Justices K. Paripoornan and K. Balanarayana Marar of the Kerala High Court banned women and girls between 10 and 50 years of age from Sabarimala. They stated that such a restriction was in accordance with tradition. In addition, the High Court directed the Government of Kerala to use police force if necessary to prevent women from entering the temple. The final decision of the court was as follows:

Such restriction (of women) imposed by the Devaswom Board is not violative of Articles 15, 25 and 26 of the Constitution of India. Such restriction is also not violative of the provisions of Hindu Place of Public Worship (Authorisation of Entry) Act, 1965, since there is no restriction between one section and another section or between one class and another class among the Hindus in the matter of entry to a temple, whereas the prohibition is only in respect of women of a particular age group and not women as a class.

=== Supreme Court verdict ===
Indian Young Lawyers Association vs The State Of Kerala
- Court: Supreme Court of India
- Full case name: Indian Young Lawyers Association & Ors. v. State of Kerala & Ors.
- Decided: 28 September 2018
- Citation: WRIT PETITION (CIVIL) NO. 373 OF 2006

Court membership
- Judges sitting: Dipak Misra, A.N. Khanwilkar, Rohintan Nariman, Indu Malhotra, D.Y. Chandrachud Reddy

Case opinions
- Majority: Deepak Mishra, A.N. Khanwilkar, Rohintan Nariman, D.Y. Chandrachud
- Dissent: Indu Malhotra

In 2006, six female members of the Indian Young Lawyers' Association petitioned the Supreme Court of India, asking them to lift the ban on women of reproductive age. They argued that the practice was a violation of their constitutional rights. They also questioned the validity of provisions in the Kerala Hindu Places of Public Worship (Authorisation of Entry) Rules Act of 1965.

On 28 September 2018, the Supreme Court of India ruled that women of all ages could enter the temple of Sabarimala. The court stated:

We have no hesitation in saying that such an exclusionary practice violates the right of [a woman] to visit and enter a temple, to freely practise Hindu religion and to exhibit her devotion towards Lord Ayyappa. The denial of this right to women significantly denudes them of their right to worship.

The verdict was passed with a 4-1 majority. Chief Justice Dipak Misra and Justices A. M. Khanwilkar, R. F. Nariman and D. Y. Chandrachud supported the admission of women to the temple, while Justice Indu Malhotra dissented. Indu Malhotra stated that every individual should be allowed to practice their faith regardless of whether the practice is rational or logical. The Supreme Court based their decision on the violation of Article 25 (Clause 1) and Rule 3(b) of Kerala Hindu Places of Worship.

On 14 November 2019, The Supreme Court Constitution Bench referred the review petitions as well as the writ petitions to a larger bench of at least seven judges, to be constituted by the Honourable Chief Justice of India. Larger benches had previously considered similar cases, such as the entry of Muslim women into mosques and the entry of Parsi women married to non-Parsi men into the holy fireplace. The decision to refer the petitions was supported by the Chief Justice Ranjan Gogoi and Justices Ajay Manikrao Khanwilkar and Indu Malhotra. Justices Rohinton Fali Nariman and Dhananjaya Y. Chandrachud dissented.

As of April 2026, a 9 judges bench is looking into the larger constitutional questions that popped up during 2019 hearings.

== Arguments against the entry of women ==
According to one argument against the entry of women, the prohibition of female worshipers is traditional. Acharya Yugbhushan Suri Maharaj, a Jain acharya, has said that women's entry is a religious issue connected to fundamental rights. Commenting on the Sabarimala debate, he said, "Whether it is Sabarimala or Jharkhand's Shikharji, the agitations are for sanctity...Religion talks about inner belief and sanctity. This should be respected. I am not against the judiciary or the Supreme Court, but they should not overlook the belief of the people." In April 2026, Jainacharya published an article in Law Beat titled "The Unfinished Decolonization: A Power the State Was Never Given," arguing that the Indian State never received a legitimate transfer of authority over the internal governance of Indian religions, as the British Crown held no such spiritual jurisdiction to convey to the Constituent Assembly.

Yoga guru Ravi Shankar also supported the traditional prohibition of women. Others argue that allowing women to enter would disrespect the male deity. J. Sai Deepak, the lawyer representing two women's groups and a devotee sangam in the Supreme Court case, has argued that the deity Ayyappan should be regarded as a person, giving him the constitutional right to privacy under Article 21. When women and girls of reproductive age visit him against his will, the argument follows, it violates Ayyappan's privacy. Some Hindu women believe that Ayyappan himself placed restrictions on women entering the temple because he wanted to be celibate, and the presence of women would distract him from this cause.

A few reporters have pointed out that gender segregation exists in other Hindu temples. Some prominent temples also restrict men's entry. For example, the Brahma temple in Pushkar prevents married men from entering the inner sanctum. Other temples prevent men from entering on certain days.

Some women choose not to enter the temple, believing that it would be an insult to Malikappurathamma's love and sacrifice.

There is also a rule for men who want to pray at the temple; they have to take a vow of celibacy for 4 weeks leading up to their visit. Some argue that female pilgrims will 'distract' the male pilgrims, who follow a 41-day period of strict abstinence from sex. A statement by the president of the Travancore Devaswom Board stated that allowing women into the temple will lead to 'immoral activities' and turn the place into 'a spot for sex tourism, like Thailand'.

Another argument is that the Sabarimala temple is situated at the top of a hill surrounded by mountains and dense forests, which some regard as physically challenging for women to navigate. An official of Sabarimala has pointed out that the lack of adequate sanitation facilities for women would make their journey difficult. Hospital facilities are also sparse.

In the review case 2026 in the Supreme Court Senior advocates like Gopal Subramanium and Aryama Sundaram have argued that a temple is the “abode of the deity". Senior Advocate Subramanium argued for focusing on the scope of Articles 25 and 26 and the balance between individual rights and denominational autonomy. Justice B.V. Nagarathna observed that a non-believer has no standing to question customs tied to a temple and deity. A person who does not subscribe to the faith should not litigate against its practices. Justice Nagarathna questioned why courts should go further into “essential religious practice” once a practice is identified as religious rather than secular.

== Arguments in favour of the entry of women ==
Those in favour of allowing women entry to the Sabarimala temple concentrate on the specific point that menstruation is not impure, and the more general point that women deserve equal rights. Activists, such as the Dalit public intellectual, Sunny M. Kapicadu, see the struggle as a continuation of Kerala renaissance which sought to undo centuries of caste and gender inequality and oppression. They therefore welcome the verdict as a reaffirmation of constitutional morality.

Some in favor of women's entry state that their opponents are motivated by taboos surrounding menstruation. According to the historian Rajan Gurukkal there is "neither ritual sanctity nor scientific justification" for the argument of menstrual pollution. He opines that the shrine was originally a "cult spot" for a tribal deity, Ayyanar, of local forest dwellers before it became a place of worship for Ayyappa in the 15th century. Unlike traditional Hindu myth (created by mistranslation of texts) that menstruation is impure, the tribal people considered it to be auspicious and a symbol of fertility. They gathered at the temple along with their women and children of all ages until the 1960s. Gurukkal also argues that there is documented evidence of young savarna women making their way into the temple until the 1980s.

Over 100 temples in Kerala are dedicated to Ayyappan. Women are allowed to enter all other temples of Ayyappan, so some argue that making an exception for Sabarimala is unusual and inconsistent.

The chief minister of Kerala, Pinarayi Vijayan, is in favor of women's entry to Sabarimala. He stated in 2018 that his party (LDF) has always stood for gender equality and would therefore provide facilities for women pilgrims to Sabarimala.

== Attempts to enter the temple ==
Prior to the Supreme Court verdict of September 2018, there had been sporadic entries of women to the temple. Former actress and politician Jayamala, for example, claimed to have entered Sabarimala in 1987 as a young woman. Following the 2018 verdict, there was immediate resistance from protesters, who made it difficult for women to enter. When Sabarimala was opened for pilgrims in October 2018 for the first time since the Supreme Court verdict, protests were immediately staged at nearby Nilakkal and Pamba, both considered to be basecamps for pilgrims on their way to the temple. Many women journalists who had come to report on the opening were assaulted by the protesters. Police had to use a lathi charge to disperse the protesters. The protesters also forced a 40-year-old woman from Andhra Pradesh to stop her journey to Sabarimala at Pamba. Suhasini Raj, a journalist working for The New York Times, was also forced to return after she was blocked by protesters near Marakkoottam.

Two women attempted to enter the temple on 19 October 2018 but were blocked by protesters about 100 metres away from the garbagriha, the innermost sanctum of the temple. They left after the priest warned that he would close the garbagriha if they attempted to climb the 18 sacred steps leading to the deity. One of the women, women's rights activist Rehana Fathimam, was later arrested on grounds of "hurting religious sentiments" for posting a photo on Facebook. The photos showed her sitting in an allegedly "obscene pose" after dressing up as a devotee of Ayyappan. She was jailed for 18 days and then released on bail.

A 46-year-old woman who claimed that "her body was full of divine power from Ayyappa, motivating her to climb Sabarimala" was denied police protection. She had to return home. Another female journalist and the president of Kerala Dalit Mahila Federation also had to leave without reaching the deity due to the actions of protesters. A female Dalit activist, despite being accompanied by police, was attacked at various places by mobs on her way to Sabarimala and decided to return after reaching Pamba. She lost her job, was forced to leave her home and had to live in an undisclosed location under police protection after threats to her life from the protesters.

Trupti Desai, women's rights activist and founder of Bhumata Brigade, was blocked by protesters at Cochin International Airport on 16 November 2018 while on her journey to Sabarimala. She decided to return home after being stranded inside the airport for more than 14 hours, vowing to come back again.

Four trans women who attempted to visit Sabarimala temple were sent back by Erumely police on 16 December 2018. They alleged that the police harassed them and asked them to dress up like men if they wanted to visit the shrine. Even though they agreed to the demands of the police, they were eventually sent back, with policing citing a general threat to law and order at Sabarimala. They returned to the shrine two days later, as the temple authorities did not object to the presence of trans women at Sabarimala.

A group of 11 women belonging to the Chennai-based women's rights' organisation Manithi was chased away by protesters soon after setting out from the Pamba basecamp on 23 December 2018. The women were under police protection. While the police claimed that the group voluntarily left the area without visiting the shrine, the group alleged that the Kerala Police pressured them to leave.

== Protests and hartals against the Supreme Court verdict ==
Sabarimala protests
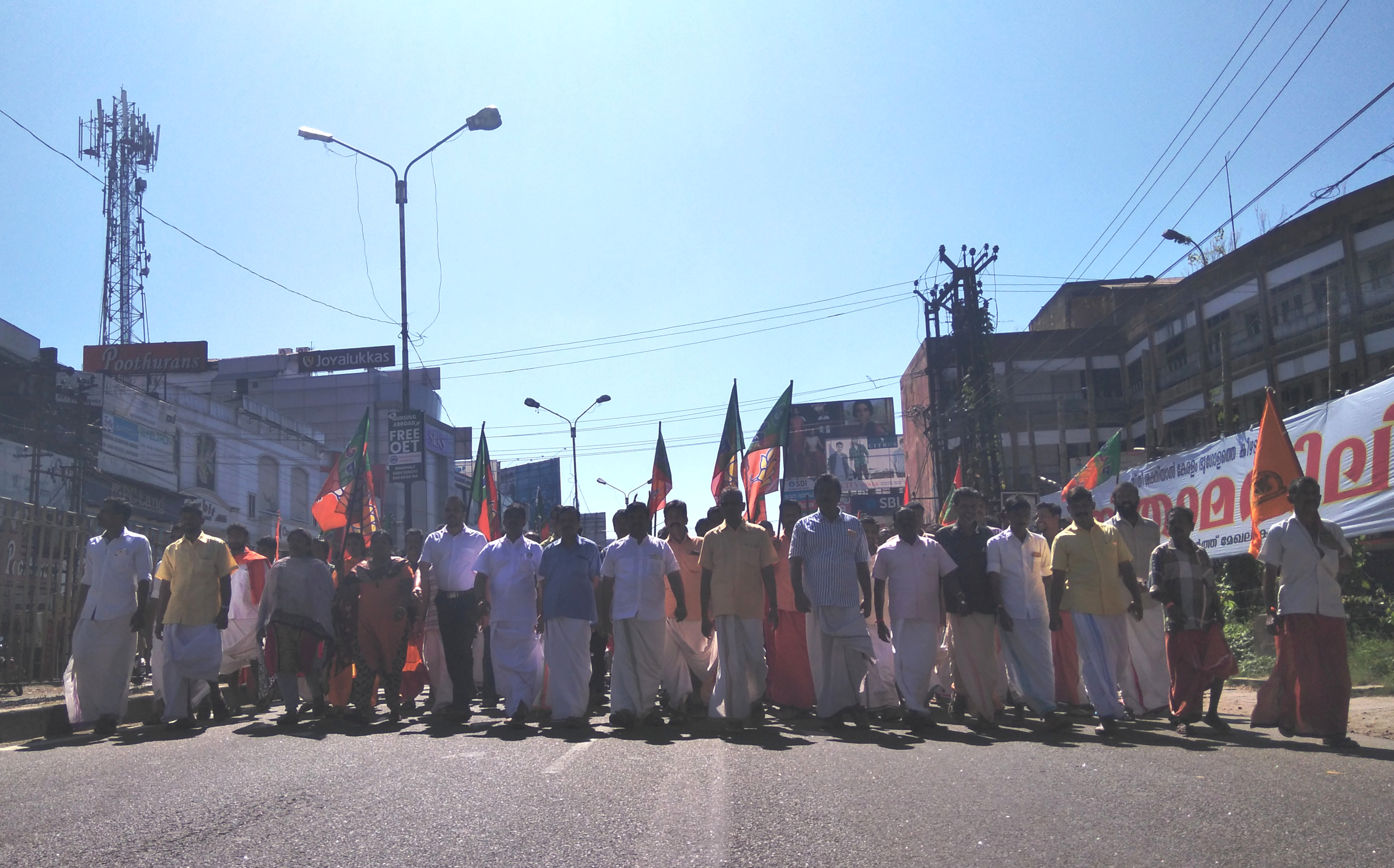
- Bharatiya Janata Party members protesting against Sabarimala women entry
- Date: October 2018 - January 2019
- Location: Kerala, India
- Caused by: Protests following the Supreme Court of India's verdict for allowing all women to enter Sabarimala temple.
- Goals: To stop women from entering Sabarimala temple
- Methods: Harthal

Parties
Supreme Court of India; Government of Kerala; Communist Party of India (Marxist); Communist Party of India	Government of India; Bharatiya Janata Party; Indian National Congress

In the period following the Supreme Court verdict, a total of seven hartals were organised in Kerala by various Hindu groups under the flag of the Sabarimala Karma Samithi.

=== October 2018 ===
The first hartal was observed in Pathanamthitta district on 7 October 2018. The BJP called for this hartal in response to alleged police violence against Prakash Babu, state president of Bharatiya Janata Yuva Morcha, during a protest march held on 6 October 2018.

The second hartal was held on 18 October 2018. In the lead-up to the hartal, Malayalam actor and BJP member Kollam Thulasi said that women who enter Sabarimala should be ripped in half. He also declared that the faithful should prevent women from entering the temple. A First Information Report was registered against him, citing his "deliberate and malicious acts, intended to outrage religious feelings of any class." The Chief Minister of Kerala, Pinarayi Vijayan, held "RSS (Rashtriya Swayamsevak Sangh)-driven upper caste religious fanatics" responsible for the violent agitation. The Indian National Congress also launched a protest demanding the state government file a review petition against the Supreme Court's verdict. Rahul Easwar, a member of the family of Sabarimala priests and leader of Ayyappa Dharma Sena, was arrested for inciting violence and rioting near the Sabarimala temple complex. He was denied bail on the grounds that he was likely to return to Sabarimala to incite further trouble. By the end of October, over 3,000 people had been arrested and around 500 cases were registered at police stations across Kerala.

=== November 2018 ===
The third hartal occurred on 2 November 2018. The putative cause was the death a lottery ticket seller, Sivadasan, who had gone on the Sabarimala pilgrimage and was found dead near Laha. BJP called for a hartal in Pathanamthitta district. They blamed police action at Pamba for his death, although police confirmed that Sivadasan had died in a traffic accident.

Anticipating protests, IPC Section 144, which can be used to prevent the assembly of people in the possibility of danger, was declared at Sannidhanam, Pamba, Nilakkal and Elavunkal when the temple reopened for the 41-day Mandalam Makaravilakku pilgrim season on 16 November 2018. Around 70 people were arrested for defying these orders and protesting near the main temple. This included K. Surendran, state secretary of the Bharatiya Janata Party, and K.P. Sasikala, leader of Hindu Aikya Vedi, who were taken into preventive detention during their journey to the temple on 17 November.

The fourth hartal in Kerala was organized by the Bharatiya Janata Party on 17 November 2018. The reason given for this hartal was the arrest of K P Sasikala. It was a statewide demonstration.

On 21 November, Thiruvananthapuram City Police Commissioner P Prakash threatened non-resident Indians (NRIs) with "getting their passports cancelled, and forcing [them] to return to India." The police commissioner accused them of "inciting riots and fermenting trouble over the Sabarimala issue" and using social media to deliberately create instability in the region. The Kerala police department was severely criticised by the High Court for the restrictions it had implemented in Sabarimala, which had caused difficulty for pilgrims. Following this criticism from the High Court, all restrictions except Section 144 were gradually removed. The Indian National Congress and Bharatiya Janata Party launched separate protests demanding the state government revoke the Section 144 restrictions.

=== December 2018 ===
The fifth hartal took place on 11 December 2018. Bharatiya Janata Party called this hartal in the Thiruvananthapuram District of Kerala. It was in response to the alleged police action against the march organised by Bharatiya Janata Yuva Morcha on 10 December 2018.

A 49-year-old man committed suicide in front of the protest site on 13 December 2018; afterward, BJP called for another statewide hartal. It was the sixth hartal invoked by BJP on Sabarimala issue since the beginning of the Mandalam Makaravilakku pilgrim season at Sabarimala. The BJP alleged that the man was an Ayyappa devotee who had immolated himself in protest against the restrictions imposed by the Kerala government at Sabarimala. The police maintained that the man had committed suicide for personal reasons and his dying declaration did not mention Sabarimala.

On 26 December, thousands of Ayyappa devotees, mainly women, took part in Ayyappa Jyothi, an event organised by Hindutva groups to protest the Supreme Court verdict. In some places, the participants at the event were attacked by activists from the Communist Party of India and Democratic Youth Federation of India. In response, Kerala Police arrested 16 people who allegedly planned the attacks. Cases are also filed against 1400 people who took part in the Ayyappa Jyothi event.

As a counter protest, women supporting the Supreme Court verdict formed a human chain called Vanitha Mathil (Women's Wall), which stretched across the state of Kerala. Around three to five million women participated in the event. Vanitha Mathil was organised by the state government.

=== January 2019 ===
The seventh hartal was on 3 January 2019. Sabarimala Karma Samithi called a statewide hartal in Kerala, supported by the Bharatiya Janata Party. The hartal was provoked by the successful entry of two women, Bindu Ammini and Kanakadurga, into Sabarimala. One of the protesters, Chandran Unnithan, a member of Sabarimala Karma Samiti, was injured when CPI(M) members started pelting stones and he died shortly of severe head injuries.

Many cases of violence and arson were reported from across the state during this particular hartal. Fed up with the economic and social effects of the hartals, trade organisations in Kerala had already decided to observe 2019 as 'anti-hartal year' and to defy future hartals. Even though police had promised them adequate protection, shops which opened in defiance of the hartal were widely attacked; some were even set on fire. Media organisations boycotted all press conferences by the Bharatiya Janata Party following unprovoked, targeted attacks on journalists.

More than 100 buses belonging to the Kerala State Road Transport Corporation were damaged. Offices, libraries and businesses related to the ruling Communist party were damaged, and incidents of street fights between CPI(M) and BJP cadres were reported in many places. Anticipating further violence, Section 144 was imposed in the towns of Palakkad and Manjeswaram the next day.

There were reports of attacks on the homes of both women who had tried to enter Sabarimala as well as those who supported the verdict. A hotel owned by Kerala Tourism Development Corporation at Chennai was also damaged by unidentified men protesting against women's entry to Sabarimala. Leaders of the ruling CPI(M) compared those unleashing violence over the Sabarimala verdict to Taliban and Khalistan terrorists.

=== Reference to a larger bench ===
After the 2019 review order sent the wider questions to a larger bench, a nine-judge bench of the Supreme Court held on 10 February 2020 that a court can refer questions of law to a larger bench while hearing a review petition. The bench framed seven questions on the scope of religious freedom under Articles 25 and 26. These included what "morality" means in those articles and whether it takes in constitutional morality, how the rights of individuals and of religious denominations relate to each other, how far courts can review religious practices, and whether people outside a religious group can challenge its practices through a public interest litigation.

The nine-judge bench, headed by Chief Justice Surya Kant, began hearing the reference on 7 April 2026. The arguments turned on the scope of Articles 25 and 26 and on the balance between individual rights and the autonomy of religious denominations.

== Successful entries ==
On 2 January 2019, two women, Bindu Ammini (aged 40) and Kanakadurga (aged 39), entered the Sabarimala shrine, which was confirmed with images from CCTV. Ammini is a resident of Koyilandy in Kozhikode district and Kanakadurga is a native of Angadipuram in the district of Malappuram. After they entered, the temple was closed for purification, and many protested. They were the first women to enter Sabarimala following the decision by the Supreme Court to end the 18-year-old restriction on women of menstrual age entering the shrine. Ammini and Kanakadurga entered the temple not via the 18 sacred steps but through the staff gate. They did so with police escort at around 3:45 AM on Wednesday 2 January 2019, when few other devotees or protesters were in the vicinity. They had previously attempted to climb the hill on 24 December, but they were blocked by protesters. According to reports, both women had stayed at a secret location, vowing not to return home until they offered prayers at the temple. The Chief Minister of Kerala, Pinarayi Vijayan, confirmed that the pair had entered the temple, and underlined that the police force was duty-bound to give protection to anyone who asked for security. He referred to the entry as a historic moment.

Their entry was followed by various more successful entries of women to the temple in the same month. On 4 January 2019, a 46-year-old woman from Sri Lanka entered the Sabarimala Ayyappa temple and prayed in the garbagriha. She became the first woman under the age of 50 to have climbed the 18 holy steps with irumudikkettu (offerings to the deity) since the Supreme Court verdict. Four days later, a 36-year-old female Dalit leader claimed to have entered the temple. To prove the claim, a Facebook group called 'Navodhana Keralam Sabarimalayilekku' ('Renaissance Kerala to Sabarimala') posted a series of videos and photos showing the Dalit leader at Sabarimala.

On 18 January 2019, the Government of Kerala informed the Supreme Court that, after Ammini and Kanakadurga, 51 women of reproductive age dodged protesters to enter the Sabarimala shrine. Media reports have noted several discrepancies in the list submitted by Kerala government; for example, their list included post-menopausal women and even one man.

== Sources ==
- "Indian Young Lawyers Association vs The State Of Kerala on 28 September, 2018". indiankanoon.org.
- "S. Mahendran vs The Secretary, Travancore ... on 5 April, 1991". indiankanoon.org.
- "Sabarimala controversy: women lawyers move Supreme Court". The Hindu. 31 July 2006. Archived from the original on 30 June 2018.
- Gurukkal, Rajan (25 October 2018). "Yes, Sabarimala Is In Peril, But Not The Way You Think". Outlook.
