= Suhas =

Suhas is a given name. Notable people with the name include:

- Suhas (Telugu actor) (born 1990), Indian actor
- Suhas Biswas (1924–1957), Indian Air Force officer
- Suhas Diggavi, American electrical engineer
- Suhas Gopinath (born 1986), Indian entrepreneur
- Suhas Joshi, Indian Marathi-language actress
- Suhas Kande, Indian politician
- Suhas Khamkar (born 1980), Indian bodybuilder
- Suhas Kulkarni (born 1950), Indian-American politician
- Suhas Vitthal Mapuskar (1935–2015), Indian physician and social activist
- Suhas Palshikar (disambiguation), multiple people
- Suhas Patankar (born 1941), Indian mechanical engineer
- Suhas Patil (born 1944), Indian-American entrepreneur and academic
- Suhas Shirvalkar (1948–2003), Indian Marathi-language writer
- Suhas Subramanyam (born 1986), American politician
- Suhas Pandurang Sukhatme (born 1938), Indian scientist
- Suhas Wadkar, Indian politician
- Suhas Lalinakere Yathiraj (born 1983), Indian para-badminton player

== See also ==
- Suhasini (disambiguation)
