= Suhasini =

Suhasini may refer to:

- Suhasini Maniratnam, an Indian actress
- Suhasini Mulay, an Indian actress
- Suhasini (Telugu actress)
- Suhasini Das, a Bangladeshi activist
- Suhasini Ganguly, an Indian freedom fighter
- Suhasini Chattopadhyay, an Indian communist and freedom fighter
- Suhasini Raj, an Indian journalist

== See also ==
- Suhas, other people
