= Bindu Ammini =

Indian lawyer and activist

- Occupations: Lawyer, Lecturer, Activist
- Spouse: K.V. Hariharan
- Children: 1

Academic background
- Education: Government Law College, Ernakulam (LL.B.)
- Alma mater: University of Kerala, Kariavattom (LL.M.)

Bindu Ammini is an Indian lawyer and lecturer at Government Law College, Kozhikode, and a Dalit activist. She is one of the two first women between the age of 10 and 50 to enter the Sabarimala Temple after a Supreme Court of India decision allowed women of reproductive age to enter the temple.

== Early life and education ==
Ammini is a Dalit who was raised in Pathanamthitta, Kerala. She is the youngest of five siblings. After her mother left her father, Ammini and her siblings were raised in poverty by their mother, who was illiterate and worked at farms, factories, and hotels.

In 2001, Ammini became the first in her family to attend college. As a student, she was a leader in Kerala Vidyarthi Sanghatana, the student wing of the Communist Party of India (Marxist–Leninist) (CPI [ML]), and became the youngest female state coordinator for CPI (ML). According to Time, "she clarifies that the party she was in is state-recognized and that she has never believed in armed rebellion", and she quit the party in 2011. (Note: In 2019, CPI (ML) politburo member PJ James said Bindu had not been connected to the party for ten years.)

She attended Netaji Higher Secondary School in Pramadom, Pathanamthitta, and did her pre-degree course at Catholicate College Pathanamthitta. She earned a Bachelor of Laws (LL.B.) from Government Law College, Ernakulam and a Master of Laws (LL.M.) from University of Kerala, Kariavattom Campus, Thiruvananthapuram.

== Career ==
Ammini has worked as a lawyer in the Koyilandy court, and has taught at Calicut University and the School of Legal Studies at the Thalassery campus of Kannur University. She also runs a grocery store with her husband. She is a lecturer at Government Law College in Kozhikode.

Ammini is a Kerala state leader for the Bhim Army, a Dalit rights organization. She ascribes to subaltern feminism, which has a focus on the rights of women in oppressed classes. In 2022, after she faced ongoing violence and cyberbullying following her entry into the Sabarimala Temple, she spoke about the casteist nature of the abuse targeted at her, stating, "The 'absolutely unprotected' is not just me, it is the women, Dalits and Adivasis" and "If you ask why I'm being targeted among all these women, caste is a factor", referring to other women who had attempted to enter the temple, such as Rehana Fathima.

After Ammini was publicly assaulted in January 2022, she stated, "I am not safe here anymore, the only option is to leave the country and seek asylum." Her legal advocate Prashant Padmanabhan has served a notice on the Kerala government, alleging a violation of the January 2019 Supreme Court order that requires the government to provide security for Ammini and Kanakadurga, and Ammini has alleged her Dalit identity is related to the failure of police to provide her protection.

== Sabarimala entry ==
After the Supreme Court decision allowing the entry of women between the ages of 10 and 50 into the Sabarimala Temple, Ammini joined social media groups created by activists. She met Kanakadurga on the Facebook page for Navothana Keralam Sabarimalayilekku (Renaissance Kerala), which was organized for women who wanted to visit the temple. Ammini has said she believes the protest against women entering the temple is politically motivated, and, "We were not trying to start trouble", and "Our goal was only to visit the temple. For the next generation of women, this is motivation."

=== First attempt ===
On 22 December 2018, Ammini, Kanakadurga, and two other women, met in Thrissur and then attempted to go to Sabarimala. The other two women quit during the trip, and on 24 December, Ammini and Kanakadurga were stopped by protesters. They then went on a hunger strike to protest the lack of police protection.

=== Second attempt ===
Ammini and Kanakadurga entered the Sabarimala temple around 3:45 am on 2 January 2019. They wore black clothes and hurried inside, escorted by the police. Videos of their temple entry were circulated in social media in India with messages of support and opposition. Their temple entry was confirmed by the chief minister of Kerala, Pinarayi Vijayan. After they entered, the priests closed the temple for a purification ceremony.

Ammini was placed under police protection after the entry to Sabarimala and went into hiding after the entry. Her house was mobbed by people belonging to Sabarimala Karma Samiti, and other organizations which opposed her entry to Sabarimala. In February 2019, she said she was still receiving death threats.

Some members of the Bharatiya Janata Party called their entry a "black day". The chief minister of Kerala, Pinarayi Vijayan, a supporter of the Supreme Court decision, said the entry into the temple by Ammini and Kankadurga was a historic moment. Senior lawyer Indira Jaising compared their entry to the temple entry movement led by B. R. Ambedkar, and represented Ammini and Kanakadurga in legal actions to obtain police protection.

=== Third attempt ===
In November 2019, the Supreme Court kept its 2018 decision in place, but set the case for review by a larger bench. The Kerala government then withdrew its support and police protection for women entering the temple, pending the decision of the Supreme Court. After this announcement, Ammini and other activists, including Trupti Desai, went to the Ernakulam City Commissioner's office in late November to seek police protection for another attempt to visit the shrine.

Ammini was attacked by chili/pepper spray outside of the commissioner's office, and was hospitalized. Afterwards, Prabhir Vishnu Poruthiyil described Ammini as the "Rosa Parks of our time", and wrote, "She has shown us the tenacity of patriarchy and has exposed the casteism lurking behind the facade of tradition."

The National Commission for Women asked the Kerala director general of police to send an action report regarding the incident. In December 2019, the Supreme Court declined to grant protection orders for the Sabarimala visit. On 24 February 2021, the Kerala High Court granted pre-arrest bail to two people alleged to be connected with the group that sprayed Ammini when she went to the Ernakulam City Commissioner's office in 2019.

== Personal life ==
When she was 18, Ammini met her husband, K.V. Hariharan, while active in student politics and they settled in Poyilkavu after their marriage. She has a daughter, Olga, named after Olga Benário Prestes who was killed in the Holocaust.

== See also ==
- Entry of women to Sabarimala
