= Sovereignty =

Supreme authority within a territory

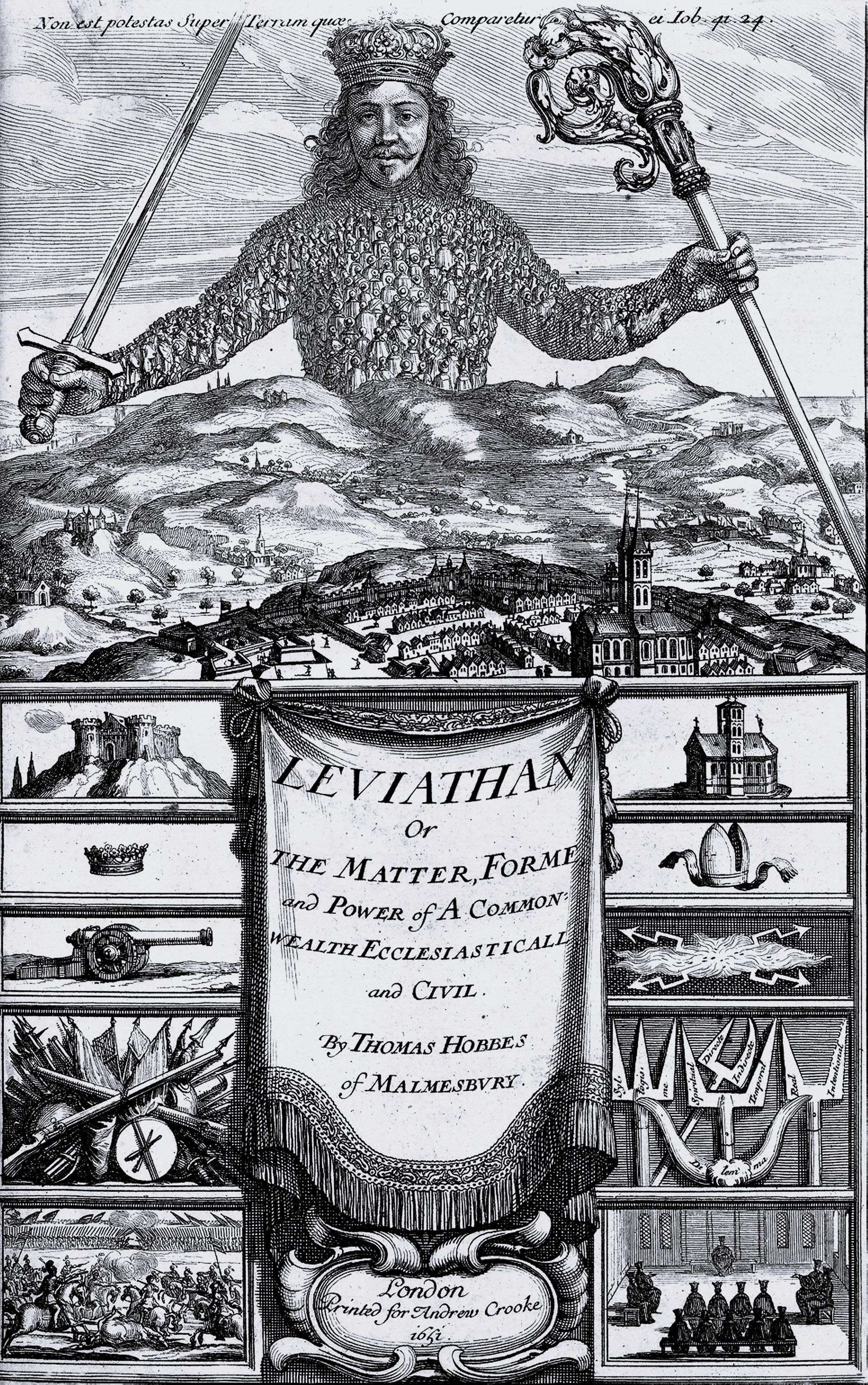
The frontispiece of Thomas Hobbes' Leviathan (1651), depicting the Sovereign as a massive body wielding a sword and crosier and composed of many individual people

Sovereignty is generally defined as supreme, independent control and lawmaking authority over a territory. It is expressed through the power to rule and make law. Sovereignty entails hierarchy within a state as well as external autonomy, which refers to the ability of a state to act independently in international affairs. In any state, sovereignty is assigned to the person, body or institution that has the ultimate authority over its citizens and the power to modify existing laws. In political theory, sovereignty is a substantive term designating supreme legitimate authority over some polity.

Under the UN Charter, the Organization is based on the sovereign equality of its members, while Article 2(7) restricts UN intervention in matters essentially within a state's domestic jurisdiction but does not prejudice enforcement measures under Chapter VII. Under Article 42, the Security Council may take action by air, sea or land forces as may be necessary when measures under Article 41 would be inadequate or have proved inadequate to maintain or restore international peace and security. The Responsibility to Protect, endorsed by UN member states at the 2005 World Summit, concerns genocide, war crimes, ethnic cleansing and crimes against humanity; when peaceful means are inadequate and national authorities manifestly fail to protect their populations, member states expressed readiness for collective action through the Security Council, in accordance with the Charter and on a case-by-case basis.

A state is generally considered to have sovereignty over a territory when it has consistently exercised state authority there without objection from other states. De jure sovereignty refers to the legal right to do so; de facto sovereignty refers to the factual ability to do so. This can become an issue of special concern upon the failure of the usual expectation that de jure and de facto sovereignty exist at the place and time of concern, and reside within the same organization.

== Etymology ==
The term arises from the unattested Vulgar Latin *superanus (itself a derived form of Latin super – "over") meaning "chief", "ruler". Its spelling, which has varied since the word's first appearance in English in the 14th century, was influenced by the English word "reign".

== Concepts ==
The concept of sovereignty has had multiple conflicting components, varying definitions, and diverse and inconsistent applications throughout history. The current notion of state sovereignty contains four aspects: territory, population, authority and recognition. According to Stephen D. Krasner, the term could also be understood in four different ways:

- Domestic sovereignty – actual control over a state exercised by an authority organized within this state
- Interdependence sovereignty – actual control of movement across the state's borders
- International legal sovereignty – formal recognition by other sovereign states
- Westphalian sovereignty – there is no other authority in the state aside from the domestic sovereign (such other authorities might be e.g. a political organization or any other external agent).

Often, these four aspects all appear together, but this is not necessarily the case – they are not affected by one another, and there are historical examples of states that were non-sovereign in one aspect while at the same time being sovereign in another of these aspects. According to Immanuel Wallerstein, another fundamental feature of sovereignty is that it is a claim that must be recognized if it is to have any meaning:

Sovereignty is a hypothetical trade, in which two potentially (or really) conflicting sides, respecting de facto realities of power, exchange such recognitions as their least costly strategy.

There are two additional components of sovereignty that should be discussed, empirical sovereignty and juridical sovereignty. Empirical sovereignty deals with the legitimacy of who is in control of a state and the legitimacy of how they exercise their power. Tilly references an example where nobles in parts of Europe were allowed to engage in private rights and Ustages, a constitution by Catalonia recognized that right which demonstrates empirical sovereignty. As David Samuel points out, this is an important aspect of a state because there has to be a designated individual or group of individuals that are acting on behalf of the people of the state. Juridical sovereignty emphasizes the importance of other states recognizing the rights of a state to exercise their control freely with little interference. For example, Jackson, Rosberg and Jones explain how the sovereignty and survival of African states were more largely influenced by legal recognition rather than material aid. Douglass North identifies that institutions want structure and these two forms of sovereignty can be a method for developing structure. Once institutions inhabit a structure, however, they cannot take action without the administrative machinery of the state, which the modern literature describes as administrative sovereignty (which may or may not include all the jurisprudential capability or stability of judicial sovereignty); hence, administrative sovereignty can be disputed or debated on the basis of a state's administrative capability. According to The Oxford Handbook of Global Policy and Transnational Administration:

Administrative sovereignty is a function that a state, state-like, multiple-state or other actor can maintain with a reasonable measure of autonomy, credibility, and reliability over time. Examples might include administrative functions for a port, an administrative and regulatory apparatus for the country’s oil and gas exploration efforts, or a system to issue identification cards to residents. If this function can be maintained without assistance from a foreign state, this feature is an example of administrative sovereignty.

For a while, the United Nations highly valued juridical sovereignty and attempted to reinforce its principle often. More recently, the United Nations is shifting away and focusing on establishing empirical sovereignty and empirically-observable mechanisms or features, like the Oxford Handbook's examples of administrative sovereignty above. Michael Barnett notes that this is largely due to the effects of the post Cold War era because the United Nations believed that to have peaceful relations states should establish peace within their territory. As a matter of fact, theorists found that during the post Cold War era many people focused on how stronger internal structures promote inter-state peace. For instance, Zaum argues that many weak and impoverished countries that were affected by the Cold War were given assistance to develop their lacking sovereignty through this sub-concept of "empirical statehood".

Sovereignty is the full right and power of a governing body to govern itself without any interference from outside sources or bodies. The concept is also seen in ancient civilizational perspectives to modern nation-state frameworks. Discussions at the Vasudhaiva Kutumbakam Ki Oar Conclave highlighted the importance of economic sovereignty and cultural autonomy in a globalized world, reflecting on how these principles shape governance models today. The conclave featured a session specifically dedicated to examining sovereignty, which included prominent speakers such as His Holiness Jainacharya Yugbhushansuri Maharaj Saheb and S. Gurumurthy, who explored these themes in depth.

== History ==
=== Classical ===
The Roman jurist Ulpian observed that:

- The people transferred all their imperium and power to the Emperor: Cum lege regia, quae de imperio eius lata est, populus ei et in eum omne suum imperium et potestatem conferat (Digest I.4.1)
- The laws do not bind the emperor: Princeps legibus solutus est (Digest I.3.31)
- A decision by the emperor has the force of law: Quod principi placuit legis habet vigorem. (Digest I.4.1)

Ulpian was expressing the idea that the emperor exercised a rather absolute form of sovereignty that originated in the people, although he did not use the term expressly.

=== Medieval ===
Ulpian's statements were known in medieval Europe, but sovereignty was an important concept in medieval times. Medieval monarchs were not absolute, at least not strongly so, because they were constrained by, and shared power with, their feudal aristocracy. Furthermore, both were strongly constrained by custom. Sovereignty existed during the Medieval period as the de jure rights of nobility and royalty.

=== Reformation ===
Sovereignty reemerged as a concept in the late 16th century, a time when civil wars had created a craving for a stronger central authority when monarchs had begun to gather power onto their own hands at the expense of the nobility, and the modern nation state was emerging. Jean Bodin, partly in reaction to the chaos of the French wars of religion, presented theories of sovereignty calling for a strong central authority in the form of absolute monarchy. In his 1576 treatise Les Six Livres de la République ("Six Books of the Republic") Bodin argued that it is inherent in the nature of the state that sovereignty must be:

- Absolute: On this point, he said that the sovereign must not be hedged in with obligations and conditions, must be able to legislate without his (or its) subjects' consent, must not be bound by the laws of his predecessors, and could not, because it is illogical, be bound by his own laws.
- Perpetual: Not temporarily delegated as to a strong leader in an emergency or a state employee such as a magistrate. He held that sovereignty must be perpetual because anyone with the power to enforce a time limit on the governing power must be above the governing power, which would be impossible if the governing power is absolute.

The treatise is frequently viewed as the first European text theorizing state sovereignty.

Bodin held that sovereignty could reside in a monarch, an aristocratic minority or the people, although he preferred monarchy. The sovereign is not above divine law or natural law. He is above (i.e. not bound by) only positive law, that is, laws made by humans. He emphasized that a sovereign is bound to observe certain basic rules derived from the divine law, the law of nature or reason, and the law that is common to all nations (jus gentium), as well as the fundamental laws of the state that determine who is the sovereign, who succeeds to sovereignty, and what limits the sovereign power. Thus, Bodin's sovereign was restricted by the constitutional law of the state and by the higher law that was considered as binding upon every human being. The fact that the sovereign must obey divine and natural law imposes ethical constraints on him. Bodin also held that the lois royales, the fundamental laws of the French monarchy which regulated matters such as succession, are natural laws and are binding on the French sovereign.

Despite his commitment to absolutism, Bodin held some moderate opinions on how government should in practice be carried out. He held that although the sovereign is not obliged to, it is advisable for him, as a practical expedient, to convene a senate from whom he can obtain advice, to delegate some power to magistrates for the practical administration of the law, and to use the Estates as a means of communicating with the people. Bodin believed that "the most divine, most excellent, and the state form most proper to royalty is governed partly aristocratically and partly democratically".

=== Age of Enlightenment ===
During the Age of Enlightenment, the idea of sovereignty gained both legal and moral force as the main Western description of the meaning and power of a State. In particular, the "Social contract" as a mechanism for establishing sovereignty was suggested and, by 1800, widely accepted, especially in the new United States and France, though also in Great Britain to a lesser extent.

Thomas Hobbes, in Leviathan (1651), put forward a conception of sovereignty similar to Bodin's, but for different reasons. He argued that to overcome the "nasty, brutish and short" quality of life without the cooperation of other human beings, people must join in a "commonwealth" and submit to a "Soveraigne [sic] Power" that can compel them to act in the common good. His expediency argument attracted many of the early proponents of sovereignty. For Hobbes, sovereignty had to be:

- Absolute: because conditions could only be imposed on a sovereign if there were some outside arbitrator to determine when he had violated them, in which case the sovereign would not be the final authority.
- Indivisible: The sovereign is the only final authority in his territory; he does not share final authority with any other entity. Hobbes held this to be true because otherwise there would be no way of resolving a disagreement between the multiple authorities.

For Hobbes, individuals mutually covenant to authorize a sovereign in order to secure protection; political obligation lasts only as long as the sovereign can effectively protect them.

Hobbes's theories decisively shape the concept of sovereignty through the medium of social contract theories. Jean-Jacques Rousseau's (1712–1778) definition of popular sovereignty (with early antecedents in Francisco Suárez's theory of the origin of power), provides that the people are the legitimate sovereign. Rousseau considered sovereignty to be inalienable; he condemned the distinction between the origin and the exercise of sovereignty, a distinction upon which constitutional monarchy or representative democracy is founded. John Locke, and Montesquieu are also key figures in the unfolding of the concept of sovereignty; their views differ with Rousseau and with Hobbes on this issue of alienability.

The second book of Jean-Jacques Rousseau's Du Contrat Social, ou Principes du droit politique (1762) deals with sovereignty and its rights. Sovereignty, or the general will, is inalienable, for the will cannot be transmitted; it is indivisible since it is essentially general; it is infallible and always right, determined and limited in its power by the common interest; it acts through laws. Law is the decision of the general will regarding some object of common interest, but though the general will is always right and desires only good, its judgment is not always enlightened, and consequently does not always see wherein the common good lies; hence the necessity of the legislator. But the legislator has, of himself, no authority; he is only a guide who drafts and proposes laws, but the people alone (that is, the sovereign or general will) has authority to make and impose them.

Rousseau, in the Social Contract argued, "the growth of the State giving the trustees of public authority more and means to abuse their power, the more the Government has to have force to contain the people, the more force the Sovereign should have in turn to contain the Government," with the understanding that the Sovereign is "a collective being of wonder" (Book II, Chapter I) resulting from "the general will" of the people, and that "what any man, whoever he may be, orders on his own, is not a law" (Book II, Chapter VI) – and predicated on the assumption that the people have an unbiased means by which to ascertain the general will. Thus the legal maxim, "there is no law without a sovereign."

According to Hendrik Spruyt, the sovereign state emerged as a response to changes in international trade (forming coalitions that wanted sovereign states) so that the sovereign state's emergence was not inevitable; "it arose because of a particular conjuncture of social and political interests in Europe."

Once states are recognized as sovereign, they are rarely recolonized, merged, or dissolved.

=== Post World War II world order ===
Dieter Grimm argues that no state is sovereign in the sense they were prior to the Second World War. Transnational governance agreements and institutions, the globalized economy, and pooled sovereignty unions such as the European Union have eroded aspects of traditional state sovereignty. After World War II, a second broad movement began in which sovereign prerogatives were increasingly circumscribed, particularly through European integration and the growth of international human-rights norms. In the years immediately prior to the war, political theorist Carl Schmitt argued that sovereignty had supremacy over constitutional and international constraints, arguing that states as sovereigns could not be judged and punished. After the Holocaust, the UN General Assembly adopted the Universal Declaration of Human Rights on 10 December 1948 by 48 votes to none, with eight abstentions. The Genocide Convention, adopted by the General Assembly the previous day, requires its contracting parties to prevent and punish genocide. In the post-Cold War period, some UN-authorized interventions and international human-rights and criminal-law institutions further circumscribed claims of absolute non-intervention. In 2005, UN member states endorsed the Responsibility to Protect as a political commitment concerning genocide, war crimes, ethnic cleansing and crimes against humanity; where peaceful means are inadequate and national authorities manifestly fail to protect their populations, they expressed readiness for collective action through the Security Council in accordance with the Charter and on a case-by-case basis.

European integration is the second form of post-world war change in the norms of sovereignty, representing a significant shift since member nations are no longer absolutely sovereign. Some theorists, such as Jacques Maritain and Bertrand de Jouvenel have attacked the legitimacy of the earlier concepts of sovereignty, with Maritain advocating that the concept be discarded entirely since it:

- stands in the way of international law and a world state,
- internally results in centralism, not pluralism
- obstructs the democratic notion of accountability

Efforts to curtail absolute sovereignty have met with substantial resistance by sovereigntist movements in multiple countries who seek to "take back control" from such transnational governance groups and agreements, restoring the world to pre World War II norms of sovereignty.

== Definition and types ==
There exists perhaps no conception the meaning of which is more controversial than that of sovereignty. It is an indisputable fact that this conception, from the moment when it was introduced into political science until the present day, has never had a meaning which was universally agreed upon.

— Lassa Oppenheim (30-03-1858 – 07-10-1919), an authority on international law

=== Absoluteness ===
An important factor of sovereignty is its degree of absoluteness. A sovereign power has absolute sovereignty when it is not restricted by a constitution, by the laws of its predecessors, or by custom, and no areas of law or policy are reserved as being outside its control. International law; policies and actions of neighboring states; cooperation and respect of the populace; means of enforcement; and resources to enact policy are factors that might limit sovereignty. For example, parents are not guaranteed the right to decide some matters in the upbringing of their children independent of societal regulation, and municipalities do not have unlimited jurisdiction in local matters, thus neither parents nor municipalities have absolute sovereignty. Theorists have diverged over the desirability of increased absoluteness.

=== Exclusivity ===
A key element of sovereignty in a legalistic sense is that of exclusivity of jurisdiction also described as the ultimate arbiter in all disputes on the territory. Specifically, the degree to which decisions made by a sovereign entity might be contradicted by another authority. Along these lines, the German sociologist Max Weber proposed that sovereignty is a community's monopoly on the legitimate use of force; and thus any group claiming the right to violence must either be brought under the yoke of the sovereign, proven illegitimate or otherwise contested and defeated for sovereignty to be genuine. International law, competing branches of government, and authorities reserved for subordinate entities (such as federated states or republics) represent legal infringements on exclusivity. Social institutions such as religious bodies, corporations, and competing political parties might represent de facto infringements on exclusivity.

=== De jure and de facto ===
De jure, or legal, sovereignty concerns the expressed and institutionally recognised right to exercise control over a territory. De facto sovereignty means sovereignty exists in practice, irrespective of anything legally accepted as such, usually in writing. Cooperation and respect of the populace; control of resources in, or moved into, an area; means of enforcement and security; and ability to carry out various functions of state all represent measures of de facto sovereignty. When control is practiced predominantly by the military or police force it is considered coercive sovereignty.

==== Sovereignty and independence ====
State sovereignty is sometimes viewed synonymously with independence; however, sovereignty can be transferred as a legal right whereas independence cannot. A state can achieve de facto independence long after acquiring sovereignty, such as in the case of Cambodia, Laos and Vietnam. Additionally, independence can also be suspended when an entire region becomes subject to an occupation. For example, when Iraq was overrun by foreign forces in the Iraq War of 2003, Iraq had not been annexed by any country, so sovereignty over it had not been claimed by any foreign state (despite the facts on the ground). Alternatively, independence can be lost completely when sovereignty itself becomes the subject of dispute. The pre-World War II administrations of Latvia, Lithuania and Estonia maintained an exile existence (and considerable international recognition) whilst their territories were annexed by the Soviet Union and governed locally by their pro-Soviet functionaries. When in 1991 Latvia, Lithuania and Estonia re-enacted independence, it was done so on the basis of continuity directly from the pre-Soviet republics.

Another complicated sovereignty scenario can arise when a regime's legitimacy is disputed. In Poland, for example, the Senate in 1998 asserted legal continuity between the Second Polish Republic and the post-1989 Third Republic and described the communist-era state as non-sovereign. In international law, however, Poland is generally treated as the same state continuously since 1918, encompassing the Second Republic, communist Poland and the Third Republic. Poland's post-war borders differ substantially from those of the Second Republic, with former eastern territories now in Belarus, Lithuania and Ukraine and former German territories incorporated in the west.

Additionally sovereignty can be achieved without independence, such as how the Declaration of State Sovereignty of the Russian Soviet Federative Socialist Republic made the Russian Soviet Federative Socialist Republic a sovereign entity within but not independent from the USSR.

At the opposite end of the scale, partially recognized or de facto states may exercise substantial self-government while their international status remains contested. Kosovo and Serbia continue an EU-facilitated dialogue aimed at comprehensive normalisation, while Somaliland, recognized by Israel as an independent state in December 2025, remains claimed by Somalia.

=== Internal ===
Internal sovereignty is the relationship between sovereign power and the political community. A central concern is legitimacy: by what right does a government exercise authority? Claims of legitimacy might refer to the divine right of kings, or to a social contract (i.e. popular sovereignty). Max Weber offered a first categorization of political authority and legitimacy with the categories of traditional, charismatic and legal-rational.

With "sovereignty" meaning holding supreme, independent authority over a region or state, "internal sovereignty" refers to the internal affairs of the state and the location of supreme power within it. Internal sovereignty does not, by itself, imply a particular form of government or source of legitimacy. Internal sovereignty examines the internal affairs of a state and how it operates. It is important to have strong internal sovereignty to keeping order and peace. When you have weak internal sovereignty, organisations such as rebel groups will undermine the authority and disrupt the peace. The presence of a strong authority allows you to keep the agreement and enforce sanctions for the violation of laws. The ability for leadership to prevent these violations is a key variable in determining internal sovereignty. The lack of internal sovereignty can cause war in one of two ways: first, undermining the value of agreement by allowing costly violations; and second, requiring such large subsidies for implementation that they render war cheaper than peace. Leadership needs to be able to promise members, especially those like armies, police forces, or paramilitaries will abide by agreements. The presence of strong internal sovereignty allows a state to deter opposition groups in exchange for bargaining. While the operations and affairs within a state are relative to the level of sovereignty within that state, there is still an argument over who should hold the authority in a sovereign state.

This argument between who should hold the authority within a sovereign state is called the traditional doctrine of public sovereignty. This discussion is between an internal sovereign or an authority of public sovereignty. An internal sovereign is a political body that possesses ultimate, final and independent authority; one whose decisions are binding upon all citizens, groups and institutions in society. Early thinkers believed sovereignty should be vested in the hands of a single person, a monarch. They believed the overriding merit of vesting sovereignty in a single individual was that sovereignty would therefore be indivisible; it would be expressed in a single voice that could claim final authority. An example of an internal sovereign is Louis XIV of France during the seventeenth century; Louis XIV claimed that he was the state. Jean-Jacques Rousseau rejected monarchical rule in favor of the other type of authority within a sovereign state, public sovereignty. Public Sovereignty is the belief that ultimate authority is vested in the people themselves, expressed in the idea of the general will. This means that the power is elected and supported by its members, the authority has a central goal of the good of the people in mind. The idea of public sovereignty has often been the basis for modern democratic theory.

==== Modern internal sovereignty ====
Within the modern governmental system, internal sovereignty is usually found in states that have public sovereignty and is rarely found within a state controlled by an internal sovereign. A form of government that is a little different from both is the UK parliament system. John Austin argued that sovereignty in the UK was vested neither in the Crown nor in the people but in the "Queen-in-Parliament". This is the origin of the doctrine of parliamentary sovereignty and is usually seen as the fundamental principle of the British constitution. With these principles of parliamentary sovereignty, majority control can gain access to unlimited constitutional authority, creating what has been called "elective dictatorship" or "modern autocracy". Public sovereignty in modern governments is a lot more common with examples like the US, Canada, Australia and India where the government is divided into different levels.

=== External ===
External sovereignty concerns the relationship between sovereign power and other states. For example, the United Kingdom uses the following criterion when deciding under what conditions other states recognise a political entity as having sovereignty over some territory;

"Sovereignty." A government which exercises de facto administrative control over a country and is not subordinate to any other government in that country or a foreign sovereign state.

— (The Arantzazu Mendi, [1939] A.C. 256), Stroud's Judicial Dictionary

External sovereignty is connected with questions of international law – such as when, if ever, is intervention by one country into another's territory permissible?

Following the Thirty Years' War, a European religious conflict that embroiled much of the continent, the Peace of Westphalia in 1648 established the notion of territorial sovereignty as a norm of noninterference in the affairs of other states, so-called Westphalian sovereignty, even though the treaty itself reaffirmed the multiple levels of the sovereignty of the Holy Roman Empire. This resulted as a natural extension of the older principle of cuius regio, eius religio (Whose realm, his religion), leaving the Roman Catholic Church with little ability to interfere with the internal affairs of many European states. It is a myth, however, that the Treaties of Westphalia created a new European order of equal sovereign states.

In international law, sovereignty means that a government possesses full control over affairs within a territorial or geographical area or limit. Determining whether a specific entity is sovereign is not an exact science, but often a matter of diplomatic dispute. There is usually an expectation that both de jure and de facto sovereignty rest in the same organisation at the place and time of concern. Foreign governments use varied criteria and political considerations when deciding whether or not to recognise the sovereignty of a state over a territory. Membership in the United Nations requires that "[t]he admission of any such state to membership in the United Nations will be affected by a decision of the General Assembly upon the recommendation of the Security Council."

Sovereignty may be recognized even when the sovereign body possesses no territory or its territory is under partial or total occupation by another power. The Holy See was in this position between the annexation in 1870 of the Papal States by Italy and the signing of the Lateran Treaties in 1929, a 59-year period during which it was recognised as sovereign by many (mostly Roman Catholic) states despite possessing no territory – a situation resolved when the Lateran Treaties granted the Holy See sovereignty over the Vatican City. Another sui generis case is the Sovereign Military Order of Malta. It has no sovereign territory; its Magistral Palace and Magistral Villa in Rome have extraterritorial status, which does not make them sovereign territory. The Order is generally regarded as having a special and limited international legal personality rather than statehood proper, maintains diplomatic relations with 115 states, and has observer status in the UN General Assembly.

The governments-in-exile of many European states (for instance, Norway, Netherlands or Czechoslovakia) during the Second World War were regarded as sovereign despite their territories being under foreign occupation; their governance resumed as soon as the occupation had ended. The government of Kuwait was in a similar situation vis-à-vis the Iraqi occupation of its country during 1990–1991. The government of Republic of China (ROC) was generally recognized as sovereign over China from 1911 to 1971 despite the 1949 victory of the Communists in the Chinese civil war and the retreat of the ROC to Taiwan. The ROC represented China at the United Nations until 1971, when the People's Republic of China obtained the UN seat. The ROC political status as a state became increasingly disputed; it became commonly known as Taiwan.

The International Committee of the Red Cross is commonly mistaken to be sovereign. It has been granted various degrees of special privileges and legal immunities in many countries, including Belgium, France, Switzerland, Australia, Russia, South Korea, South Africa and the US, and soon in Ireland. The Committee is a private organisation governed by Swiss law.

=== Shared and pooled ===
Just as the office of head of state can be vested jointly in several persons within a state, the sovereign jurisdiction over a single political territory can be shared jointly by two or more consenting powers, notably in the form of a condominium.

Likewise the member states of international organizations may voluntarily bind themselves by treaty to a supranational organization, such as a continental union. In the case of the European Union member-states, this is called "pooled sovereignty".

Another example of shared and pooled sovereignty is the Acts of Union 1707, which united Scotland and England into the Kingdom of Great Britain. It was a full economic union, meaning the Scottish and English systems of currency, taxation and laws regulating trade were aligned. Nonetheless, Scotland and England never fully surrendered or pooled all of their governance sovereignty; they retained many of their previous national institutional features and characteristics, particularly relating to their legal, religious and educational systems. In 2012, the Scottish Government, created in 1998 through devolution in the United Kingdom, negotiated terms with the Government of the United Kingdom for the 2014 Scottish independence referendum which resulted in the people of Scotland deciding to continue the pooling of its sovereignty with the rest of the United Kingdom.

=== Nation-states ===
A community of people who claim the right of self-determination based on a common ethnicity, history and culture might seek to establish sovereignty over a region, thus creating a nation-state. Such nations are sometimes recognised as autonomous areas rather than as fully sovereign, independent states.

=== Federations ===
In a federal system of government, sovereignty also refers to powers which a constituent state or republic possesses independently of the national government. In a confederation, constituent entities retain the right to withdraw from the national body and the union is often more temporary than a federation.

Different interpretations of state sovereignty in the United States of America, as it related to the expansion of slavery and fugitive slave laws, led to the outbreak of the American Civil War. Depending on the particular issue, sometimes both northern and southern states justified their political positions by appealing to state sovereignty. Fearing that slavery would be threatened by results of the 1860 presidential election, eleven slave states declared their independence from the federal Union and formed a new confederation. The United States government rejected the secessions as rebellion, declaring that secession from the Union by an individual state was unconstitutional, as the states were part of an indissoluble federation in Perpetual Union.

=== Sovereignty versus military occupation ===
In situations related to war, or which have arisen as the result of war, most modern scholars still commonly fail to distinguish between holding sovereignty and exercising military occupation.

In regard to military occupation, international law prescribes the limits of the occupant's power. Occupation does not displace the sovereignty of the occupied state, though for the time being the occupant may exercise supreme governing authority. Nor does occupation effect any annexation or incorporation of the occupied territory into the territory or political structure of the occupant, and the occupant's constitution and laws do not extend of their own force to the occupied territory.

To a large extent, the original academic foundation for the concept of "military occupation" arose from On the Law of War and Peace (1625) by Hugo Grotius and The Law of Nations (1758) by Emmerich de Vattel. Binding international rules regarding the conduct of military occupation were more carefully codified in the 1907 Hague Convention (and accompanying Hague Regulations).

In 1946, the Nuremberg International Military Tribunal stated with regard to the Hague Convention on Land Warfare of 1907: "The rules of land warfare expressed in the Convention undoubtedly represented an advance over existing International Law at the time of their adoption ... but by 1939 these rules ... were recognized by all civilized nations and were regarded as being declaratory of the laws and customs of war."

== Acquisition ==
A number of modes for acquisition of sovereignty are presently or have historically been recognized in international law as lawful methods by which a state may acquire sovereignty over external territory. The classification of these modes originally derived from Roman property law and from the 15th and 16th century with the development of international law. The modes are:

- Cession is the transfer of territory from one state to another usually by means of treaty;
- Occupation is the acquisition of territory that belongs to no state (or terra nullius);
- Prescription is the effective control of territory of another acquiescing state;
- Operations of nature is the acquisition of territory through natural processes like river accretion or volcanism;
- Adjudication and
- Conquest (historically; acquisition of territory by force is prohibited under modern international law).

Limits of national jurisdiction and sovereignty
Outer space (including Earth orbits; the Moon and other celestial bodies, and their orbits)
national airspace		territorial waters airspace	contiguous zone airspace	international airspace		
land territory surface	internal waters surface	territorial waters surface	contiguous zone surface	Exclusive Economic Zone surface	international waters surface	
internal waters		territorial waters	Exclusive economic zone		international waters	
land territory underground		Continental shelf surface			extended continental shelf surface	international seabed surface
land territory underground		Continental shelf underground			extended continental shelf underground	international seabed underground

full national jurisdiction and sovereignty
restrictions on national jurisdiction and sovereignty
international jurisdiction per common heritage of mankind

== Justifications ==
There exist vastly differing views on the moral basis of sovereignty. A fundamental polarity is between theories which assert that sovereignty is vested directly in the sovereigns by divine or natural right, and theories which assert it originates from the people. In the latter case there is a further division into those which assert that the people effectively transfer their sovereignty to the sovereign (Hobbes), and those which assert that the people retain their sovereignty (Rousseau).

During the brief period of absolute monarchies in Europe, the divine right of kings was an important competing justification for the exercise of sovereignty. The Mandate of Heaven had similar implications in China for the justification of the Emperor's rule, though it was largely replaced with discussions of Western-style sovereignty by the late 19th century.

A republic is a form of government in which the people, or some significant portion of them, retain sovereignty over the government and where offices of state are not granted through heritage. A common modern definition of a republic is a government having a head of state who is not a monarch.

Democracy is based on the concept of popular sovereignty. In a direct democracy the public plays an active role in shaping and deciding policy. Representative democracy permits a transfer of the exercise of sovereignty from the people to a legislative body or an executive (or to some combination of the legislature, executive and Judiciary). Many representative democracies provide limited direct democracy through referendum, initiative, and recall.

Parliamentary sovereignty refers to a representative democracy where the parliament is ultimately sovereign, rather than the executive power or the judiciary.

== Views ==
- Classical liberals such as John Stuart Mill consider every individual as sovereign.
- Realists view sovereignty as being untouchable and as guaranteed to legitimate nation-states.
- Rationalists see sovereignty similarly to realists. However, rationalism states that the sovereignty of a nation-state may be violated in extreme circumstances, such as human rights abuses.
- Internationalists believe that sovereignty is outdated and an unnecessary obstacle to achieving peace, in line with their belief in a global community. In the light of the abuse of power by sovereign states such as Hitler's Germany or Stalin's Soviet Union, they argue that human beings are not necessarily protected by the state whose citizens they are and that the respect for state sovereignty on which the UN Charter is founded is an obstacle to humanitarian intervention.
- Anarchists and some libertarians deny the sovereignty of states and governments. Anarchists often argue for a specific individual kind of sovereignty, such as the Anarch as a sovereign individual. Salvador Dalí, for instance, talked of "anarcho-monarchist" (as usual for him, tongue in cheek); Antonin Artaud of Heliogabalus: Or, The Crowned Anarchist; Max Stirner of The Ego and Its Own; Georges Bataille and Jacques Derrida talked of a kind of "antisovereignty". Therefore, anarchists join a classical conception of the individual as sovereign of himself, which forms the basis of political consciousness. The unified consciousness is sovereignty over one's own body, as Nietzsche demonstrated (see also Pierre Klossowski's book on Nietzsche and the Vicious Circle). See also sovereignty of the individual and self-ownership.
- Imperialists hold a view of sovereignty where power rightfully exists with those states that hold the greatest ability to impose the will of said state, by force or threat of force, over the populace of other states with weaker military or political will. They effectively deny the sovereignty of the individual in deference to either the good of the whole or to divine right.

According to Matteo Laruffa "sovereignty resides in every public action and policy as the exercise of executive powers by institutions open to the participation of citizens to the decision-making processes"

== See also ==
- Air sovereignty
- Aspirant state
- Autonomous area
- Basileus
- Client state
- Data sovereignty
- Decolonization
- Food sovereignty
- Jurisdiction
- List of sovereign states
- Mandate (politics)
- Monetary sovereignty
- Nationalization
- National sovereignty
- Network sovereignty
- Option of nationality
- Plenary authority
- Protectionism
- Puppet state
- Right of conquest
- Right to exist
- Self-determination
- Self-governance
- Self-ownership
- Self-sovereign identity
- Sovereign base
- Sovereign immunity
- Sovereigntism
- Suzerainty
- Technological sovereignty
- Westphalian system
