= Wadkar =

Wadkar is a Marathi-based surname. Notable people with the name include:

- Akshay Wadkar (born 1994), Indian cricketer
- Dattaram Wadkar (1929–2007), Indian music arranger and music director
- Hansa Wadkar (1923–1971), Marathi and Hindi film and stage actress of Indian cinema
- Suhas Wadkar, Indian politician and Deputy Mayor
- Suresh Wadkar (born 1955), Indian playback singer
- Vinit Wadkar (born 1955), Indian cricketer

The Surname Is Also Famous in Various Kokani Villages in the city of District and the City of Ratnagiri Some of the name of the villages and Cities That have the people that bear the surname are Rajapur, Katali and the most famous Sakhri Nate
