= Sunny M. Kapicadu =

Indian writer and activist

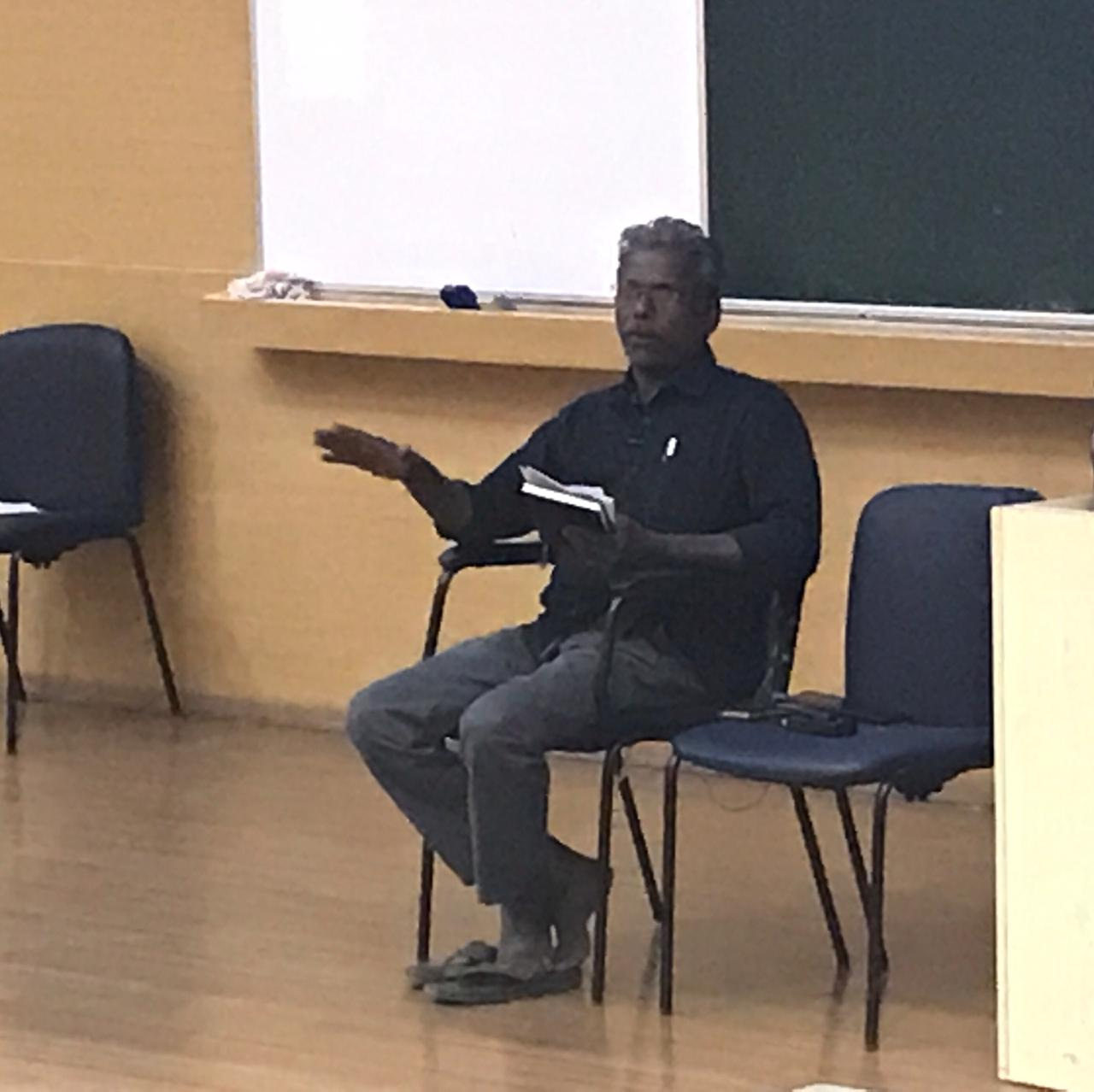
- Kapicadu at a debate on 'Economic Reservation' at IIT Bombay
- Citizenship: Indian
- Education: SMV NSS HSS Kallara; Mahatma Gandhi University.
- Occupations: Social activist, writer, LIC employee
- Writing career
- Notable work: Janathayum Janadipathyavum: Dalit Vijnanthinte Rashtriya Padangal

Sunny Kapicadu is a Dalit writer-activist from Kottayam, Kerala, India. He has been vocal about the marginalization of the downtrodden. He has taken active part in numerous protests related to issues faced by Dalit communities. Several of his speeches are archived on social media portals like YouTube.

== Personal life ==
Kapicadu hails from Kottayam. He is an alumnus of SMV, NSS, HSS, Kallara, and Mahatma Gandhi University.

He is an LIC employee by profession.

== Position on issues and activism ==
Kapicadu's critique of caste encompasses many dimensions including membership through birth, forced endogamy, control of women’s sexuality, violence, exclusion, unequal possession of land and capital, and the collective mental state that in turn manifests as actual physical force.

Kapicadu vehemently criticised the move of Left Democratic Front government in Kerala to give reservation for Economically Weaker Section among higher castes. He argued that such a move is unconstitutional.

He expressed solidarity with the verdict on entry of women to Sabarimala by the Supreme Court of India. He sees the struggle as a continuation of the Kerala renaissance which sought to undo centuries of caste and gender inequality and oppression. He therefore welcomes the verdict as a reaffirmation of constitutional morality. He described the protests against the court verdict as both anti-woman and anti-Dalit. He also called those protests a "mutiny by the Malayali shudras".

Another cause that Kapicadu has fought for is that of burial grounds for Dalits.

There was a death threat against him by a Bharatiya Janata Party worker from Thiruvananthapuram in 2019.

== Notable works ==
#	Title	Title in Malayalam	Year	Publisher
1	Janathayum Janadipathyavum: Dalit Vijnanthinte Rashtriya Padangal	ജനതയും ജനാധിപത്യവും: ദളിത് വിജ്ഞാനത്തിന്റെ രാഷ്ട്രീയ പാഠങ്ങൾ	2017	Viddyarthi Publications, Calicut
