= Hemangi Worlikar =

Indian Politician

Deputy Mayor of Mumbai
- In office 2017–2019
- Succeeded by: Suhas Wadkar

Personal details
- Party: Shiv Sena

Hemangi Worlikar is a Shiv Sena politician from Mumbai, Maharashtra.

== Positions held ==
- 2012: Elected as corporator in Brihanmumbai Municipal Corporation
- 2016: Elected as chairman of Education Committee in Brihanmumbai Municipal Corporation
- 2017: Re-elected as corporator in Brihanmumbai Municipal Corporation
- 2017: Elected as Deputy Mayor of Brihanmumbai Municipal Corporation
