= Yugbhushan Suri =

21st century Indian Jain ascetic

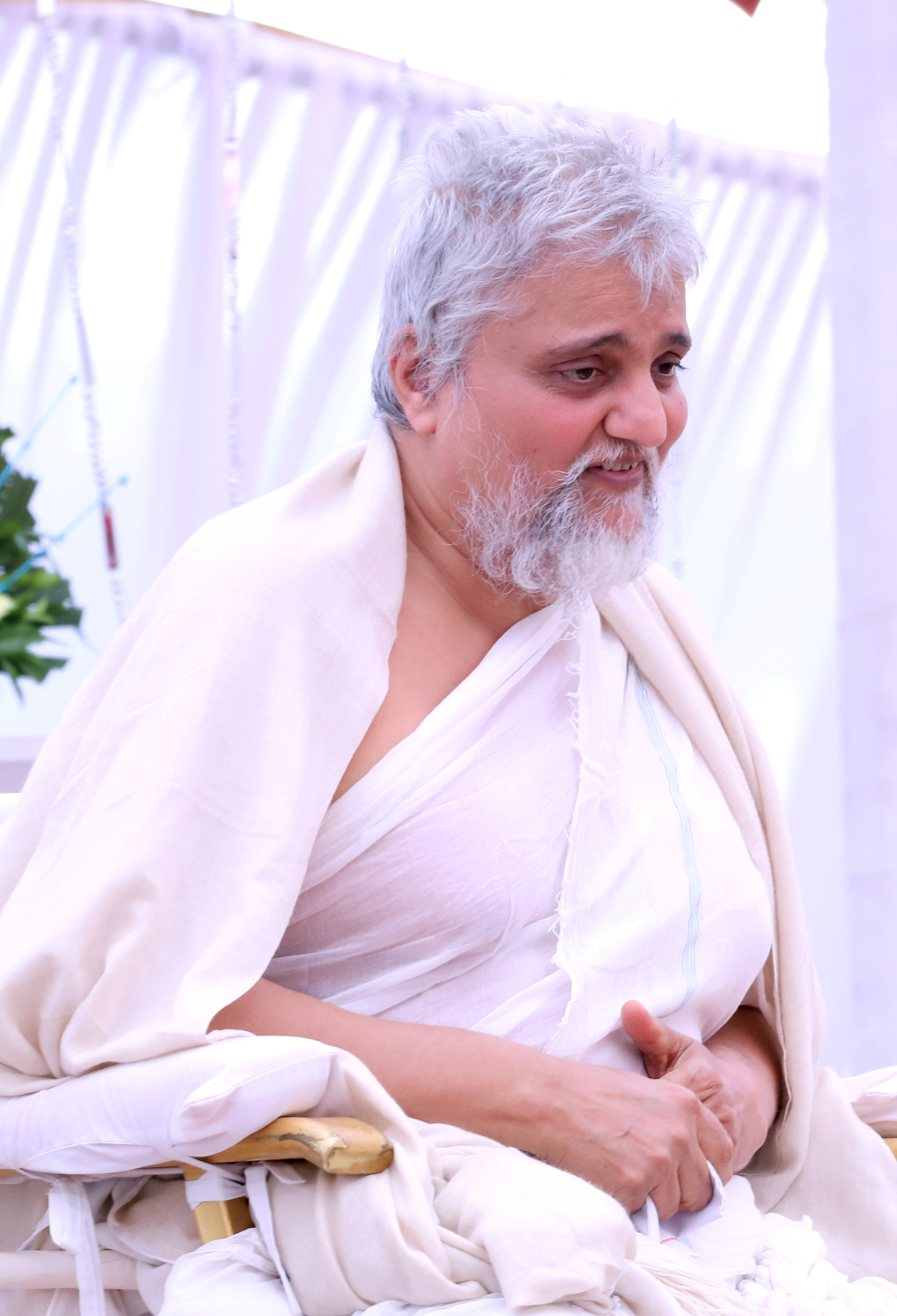
- Yugbhushan Suri
- Title: Pandit Maharaj Saheb

Personal life
- Born: Naveen Khimji Mota; 26 October 1957

Religious life
- Religion: Jainism
- Sect: Śvētāmbara

Yugbhushan Suri(born 26 October 1957) born as Naveen Khimji Mota is a Jain acharya of Shwetamber tradition.

He is also titled as Gachhadhipati amongst Jain followers.

== Early life ==
He is a disciple of Acharya Ramchandrasuri and was initiated into monkhood on 29 April 1979 along with his elder brother Muni Mohjit Vijayji.

He was appointed to Acharya position at Deolali on 23 April 2008.

== Sainthood ==
Yugbhushan Suri leads Jyot, an organization spreading Jainism. He gave the concept to Jyot for films like Chal Man Jeetva Jaiye, an urban Gujarati morality drama, and Ek Cheez Milegi Wonderful, a scientific and philosophical movie.

In 2017, under the guidance of Yugbhushan Suri, a 50-foot tall 3D image projection of Jain Lord Mahavira emerging from Sabarmati River was organised on the evening of birth anniversary of Mahavira Swami.

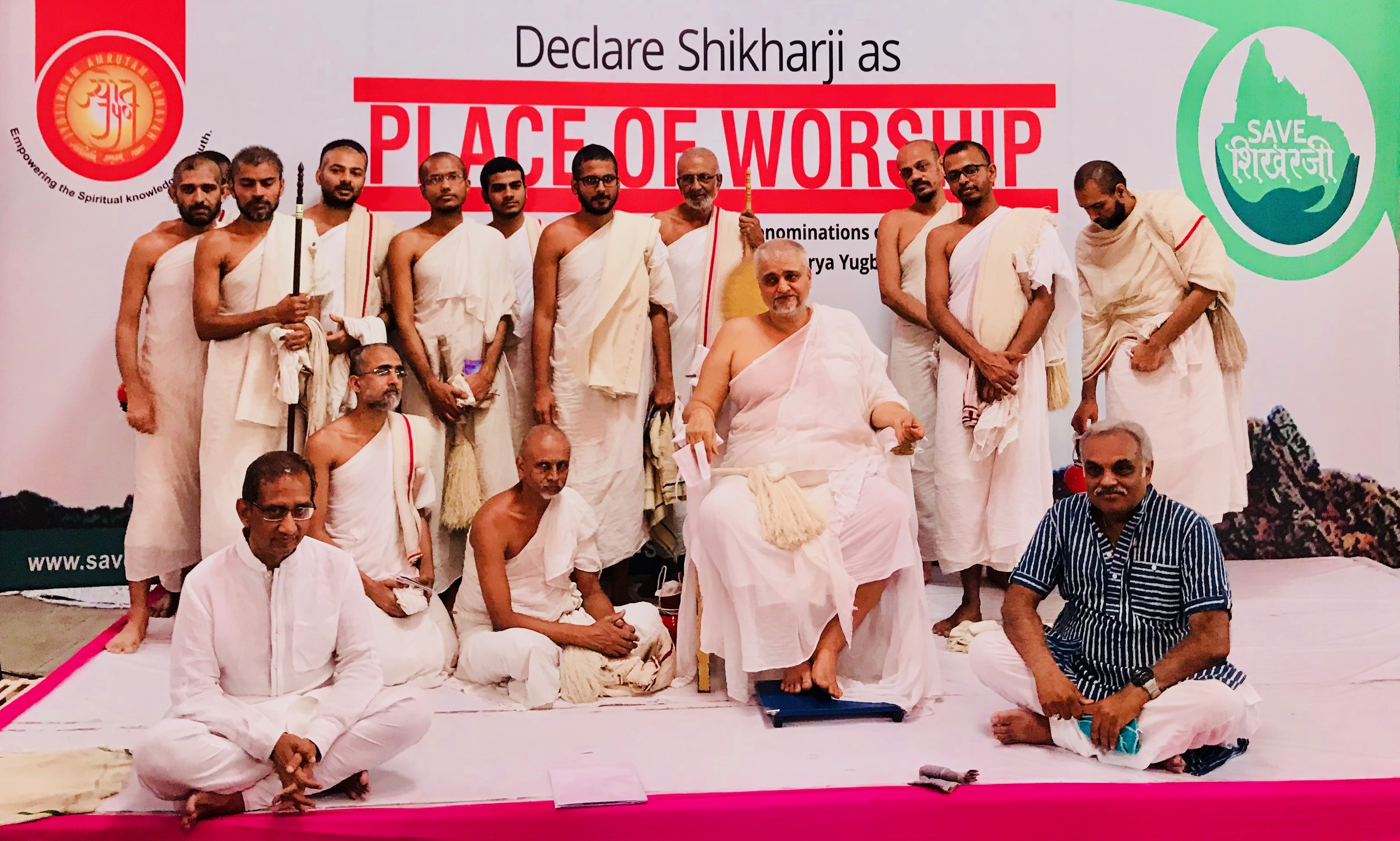
Jainacharya Yugbhushan Surishwarji during Save Shikharji Movement

Yugbhushan Suri led the Shikharji Movement, 2018 against Jharkhand government's project related to the development of commercial infrastructure on the hill of Shikharji. The hill is considered sacred by all Jain sects. He is concerned about government's effects on all religions and often supports agitations based on the sanctity of religious places. Jain Acharya's letter to the CJI highlights differences between Indian and Western religions and urges respect for Indian faiths.

== Writings ==
In an article with FirstPost, Yugbhushan emphasised the importance of religious sovereignty in India as a means for global influence. Despite withstanding centuries of foreign invasion, the religious framework is still constantly meddled with in independent India. To maximise its soft power and revive the civilisational heritage, he says that India must correct historical wrongs and ensure religious sovereignty.

At a conference organised in tribute to Maharana Pratap, Yugbhushan elaborated on how Maharana Pratap is considered the icon of sovereignty. Sovereignty is the most invaluable political aspect that must be protected at all costs. Delving into Indian history, he explained that during independence, India was granted legislative sovereignty, not absolute temporal sovereignty. Consequently, India was brought under the sovereignty of the British Empire in a de-jure manner. He guides contemporary Indian leaders by stating that India must break the de-jure sovereignty from under the British monarch and establish it with indigenous sources to secure India's independence and sovereignty for the future.

== Media ==
The Gitarth Ganga research institute organised an assembly, wherein Yugbhushansuri spoke about the protection of dharmik sampatti and management of sources of religious income to spread awareness among the Jain community. The assembly was attended by 276 representatives from 231 shravak sanghs of Ahmedabad and approximately 25 CAs and CSs, among others, totalling 430 individuals.

Arun Anand interviewed for FirstPost to understand his insightful opinions about how India's G20 theme of Vasudhaiva Kutumbakam can positively influence international relations, especially in the context of the Russian invasion of Ukraine, terrorism and other global conflicts. During the interview, he explained that although India has immense potential, there is a long way to go to compete with China. Moreover, although India is home to all major religions, only Christianity has a global voice. Yugbhushansuri emphasises that other spiritual voices that encourage conflict resolution must be internationally recognised in an institutional set-up.

In an opinion piece with FirstPost, Mr. Abhinav Pandya of Usanas Foundation shared his insights on a panel discussion held under Yugbhushansuri, one of the finest minds on strategy and foreign policy today. The panel discussed the topic of “Ethics of Kutumb towards Achieving Vasudhaiva Kutumbakam”. Mr. Pandya elaborated on his perspective in the article based on his realisation that envisioned the topic as India's contribution to international relations theories. Modern international relations is dominated by Western theories, which focus on conflict and struggle. However, these theories are unlike the lived experiences of the Eastern world. Therefore, Yugbhushansuri provided this topic (ethics of a kutumb can help achieve Vasudhaiva Kutumbakam) as a revolution to international relations that focuses on ethics, morals and feelings of a shared future.

== See also ==
- Manatunga
- Devardhigani Kshamashraman
- Yashovijaya
