= Suhas Palshikar =

Suhas Palshikar may refer to:

- Suhas Palshikar (academic), Indian political scientist
- Suhas Palshikar (actor), Indian actor
