= Mini Pampa, Malappuram =

Mini Pampa മിനി പമ്പ
- Pilgrim Centre
- Country: India
- State: Kerala
- District: Malappuram

Languages
  - Official: Malayalam, English
- Time zone: UTC+5:30 (IST)

Mini Pampa is a major halting station for Hindu pilgrims from north Kerala, Tamil Nadu and Karnataka and has been declared an official transit point of Sabarimala. The premises of the Mallur Siva Temple near Kuttippuram bridge, known as ‘Mini Pampa,' have been increasingly attracting tourists. It is located on the banks of Bharathappuzha.

== Image Gallery ==
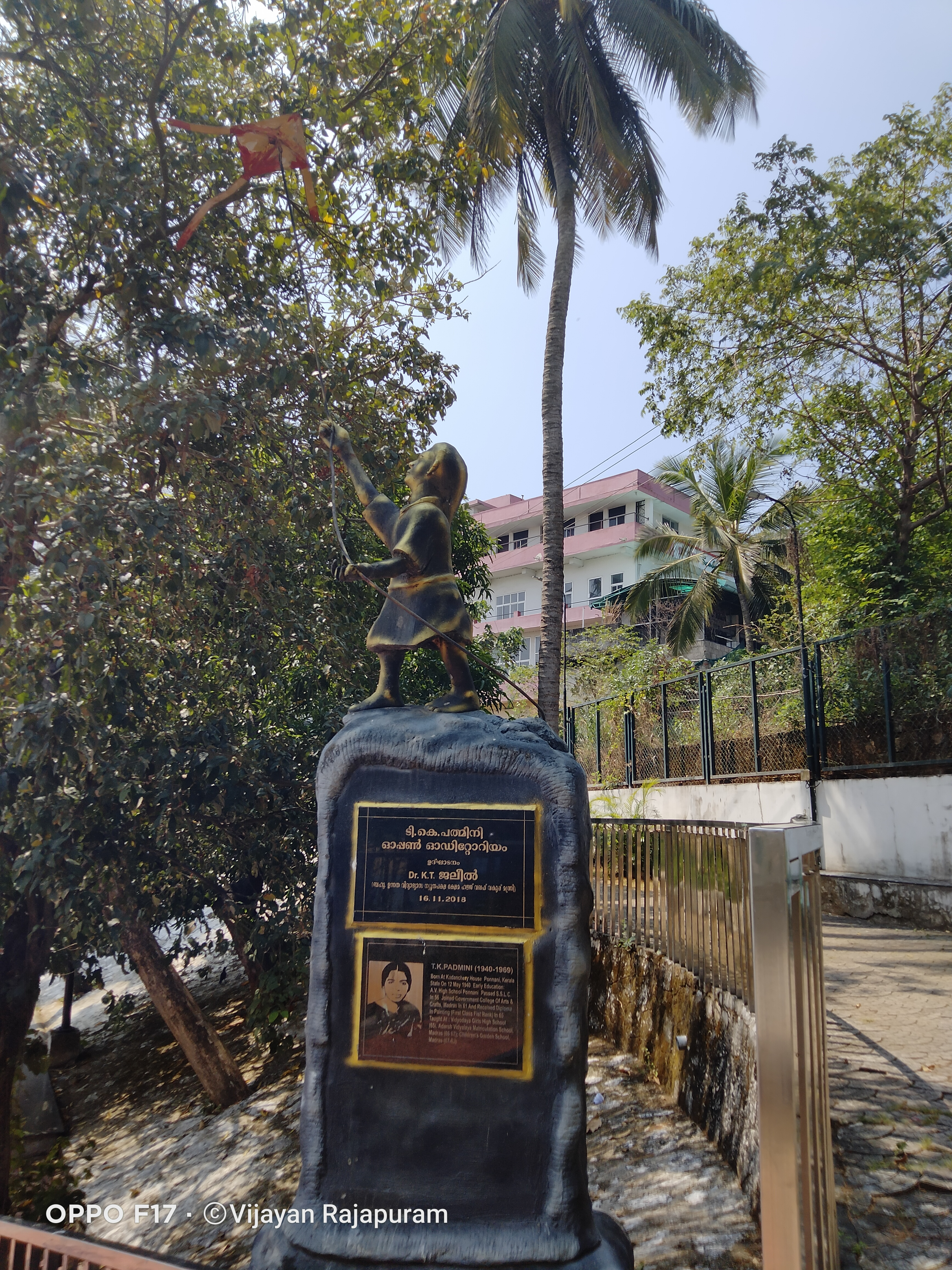
T. K. Padmini Open Auditorium, Mini Pamba_Statue The Girl Flying Kite

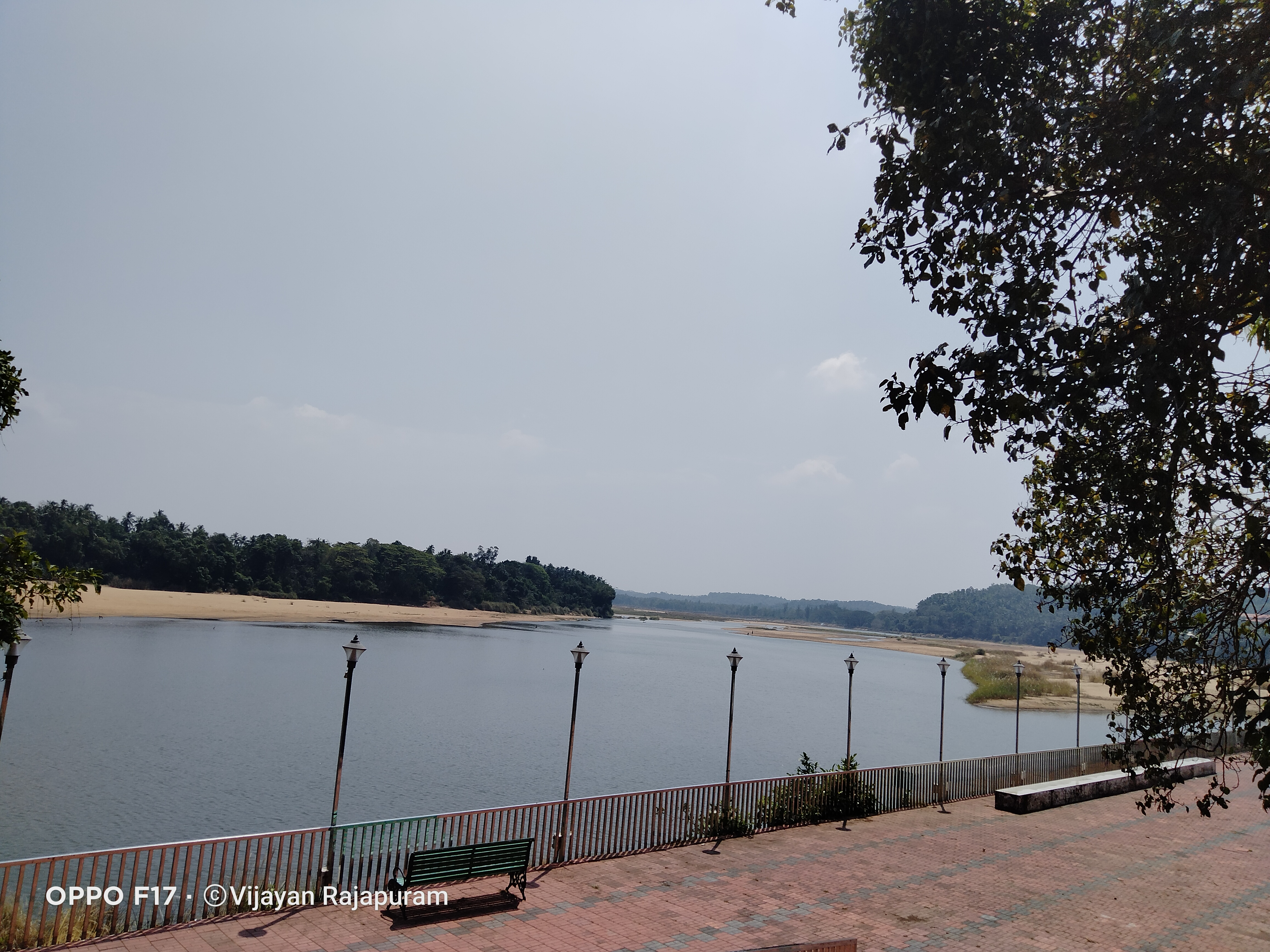
Bharathappuzha at Kuttippuram -a view from Mini Pamba point

Kuttippuram Bridge over Bharathappuzha -a view from Mini Pamba point

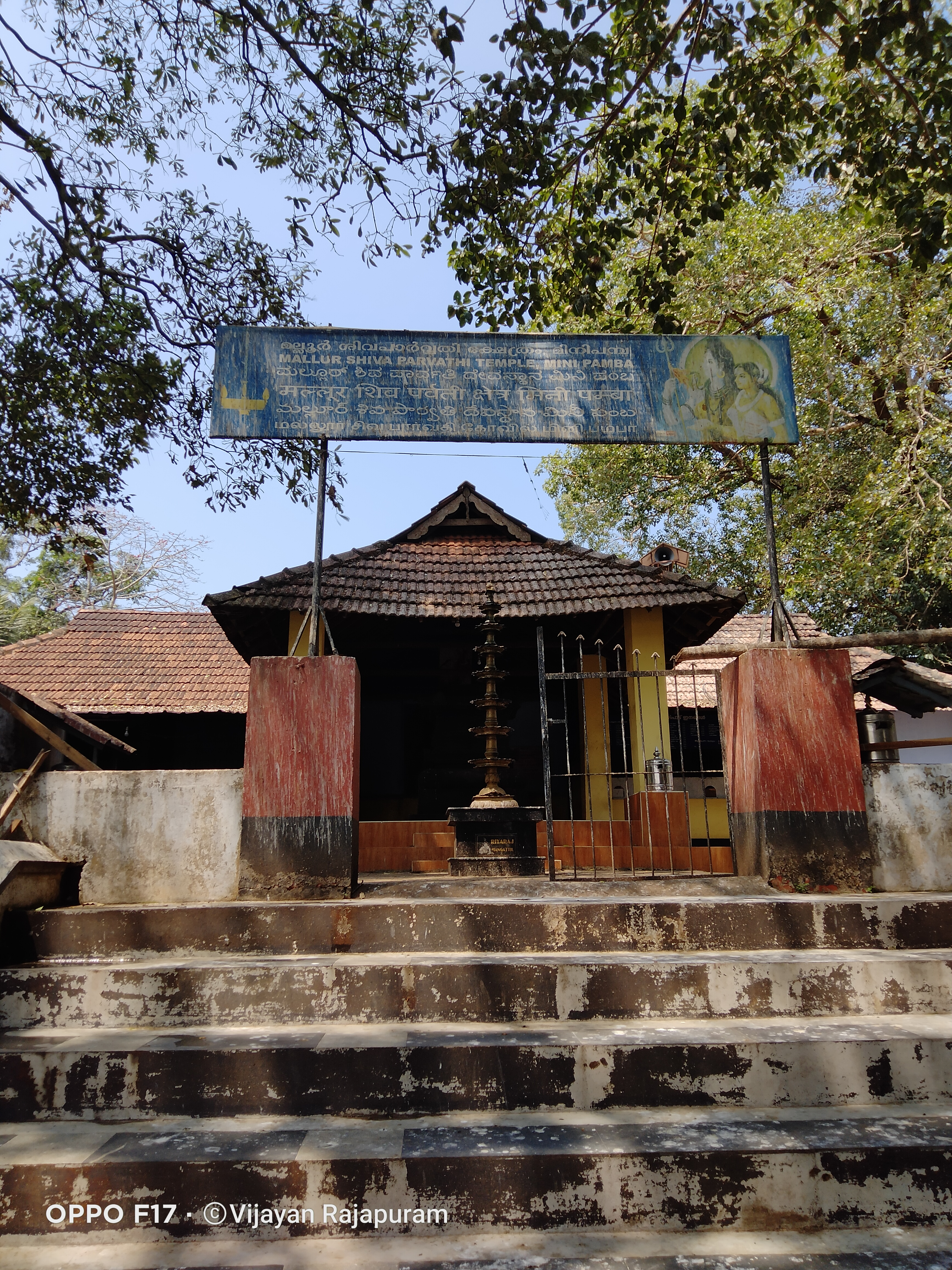
Mallur Siva Temple near Kuttippuram bridge at Mini pamba
