= Rehana Fathima =

Indian women's rights activist

- Born: AS Fathima; Kochi, Kerala, India
- Other name: Surya Gayatri
- Education: MCA
- Children: 2

Rehana Fathima, also known as Suryagayathri, is an Indian women's rights activist from Kerala.

She has a background in telecommunications and modeling, and has participated in various protests against moral policing and sexism. Fathima gained widespread attention in October 2018 when she was one of two women who attempted to enter the Sabarimala temple in Kerala following the Supreme Court's decision to lift the ban on women of menstruating age. She has faced legal consequences for her activism, including arrests for allegedly offensive Facebook posts and a body painting video. She wrote an autobiography named 'Shareeram Samaram Sannidhyam'.

== Early life and education ==
Rehana Fathima Pyarijaan Sulaiman was born into an orthodox Muslim family. Her father Pyarijaan Sulaiman died when she was in Class 12. She has a sister.

Fathima completed B.Com and MCA degrees with first rank from Indira Gandhi National Open University.

== Career ==
Fathima worked as a telecommunications technician with BSNL until May 2020, when she was forced to take compulsory retirement.

Fathima also modelled, before becoming a women's rights activist. Rehana has also acted in a Malayalam film titled 'Eka' written and directed by her husband Manoj K Sreedhar, who is a poet and graduate from Pune film institute. The movie talks about the lives of intersex persons. According to The Quint, "The posters of Eka carried the tagline: ‘I am intersex. I have a penis and vagina by birth. I want to live.’"

== Activism ==
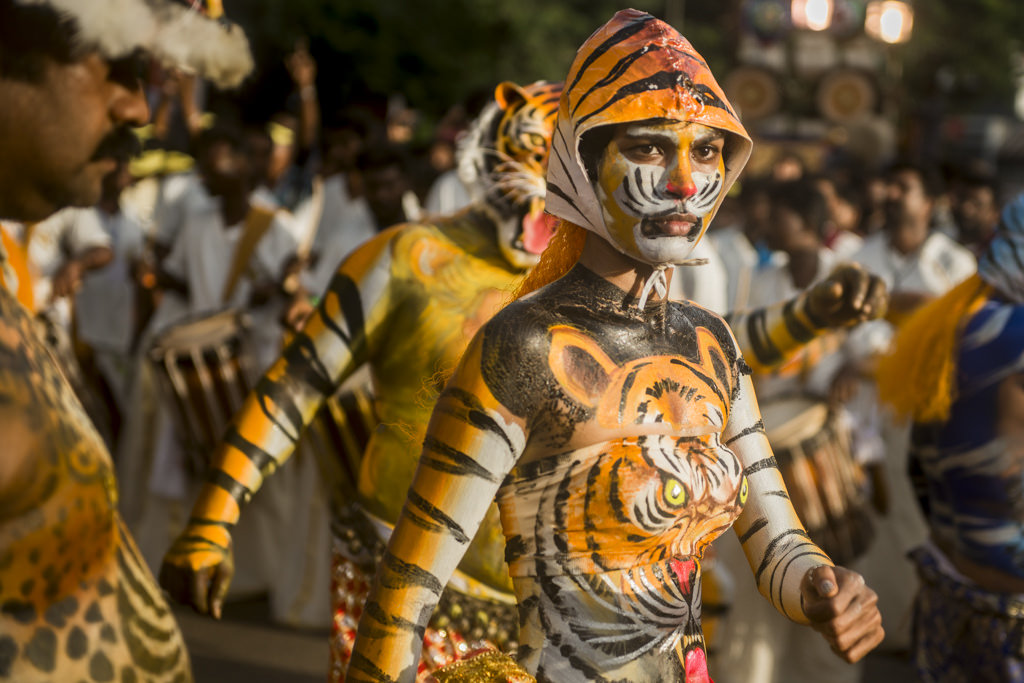
Fathima, with body art, celebrating the Hindu festival Puli Kali among a mostly-male group. (Kerala; 2016)

=== Kiss of Love protest ===
Fathima and her partner film-maker Manoj K Sreedhar, participated in the 2014 Kiss of Love protest in Kochi against moral policing.

=== Onam tiger mask dance ===
Fathima also participated in the Puli Kali (annual Onam tiger mask dance), a popular event in Thrissur which usually see the attendance of all-male troupes.

=== Sexism protest ===
Scroll.in reports that in March 2018, Fathima joined a protest and "kicked up a social media storm by posting pictures with watermelons covering her breasts in protest against a professor for saying women who did not cover their chests enough showed off their breasts like watermelons in a shop." The Quint reported "The photo received both support and backlash from people, and Facebook took it down after the number of trolls and abusive comments piled up."

=== Sabarimala temple ===
For centuries, females of childbearing age (approx. age 10–50) have been banned from worshipping at the Sabarimala temple in Kerala, India. Some devotees believe that the resident deity is practising celibacy and women who can carry children may sway him from his vow. According to an NDTV article, some feel the denial of entry of women is rooted in the long-standing cultural belief that menstruating women are "impure". In September 2018, after a 20-year legal challenge, the Supreme Court of India lifted the ban. The Quint reported "While pronouncing the judgment, CJI Misra said a woman is not inferior to a man and patriarchy cannot be permitted to win over faith, while Justice Chandrachud said to treat women as children of a lesser god is to blink at the Constitution itself."

According to Scroll.in, in October 2018, Fathima was one of two women of menstruating age who almost were the first to enter the Sabarimala temple in Kerala after the Supreme Court allowed the entry of women of all ages to pray there. The two women were escorted by eighty police officers in riot gear, but were blocked by a group of about 300 people at the sacred steps to the shrine. The Quint, The News Minute and India Today reported that afterwards, Fathima's home was vandalized.

=== Facebook selfie ===
In November 2018, BBC News reported Fathima was arrested and detained for fourteen days after police received complaints about an October 2018 selfie she posted on Facebook. According to BBC News, the picture "showed her dressed in black (the colour most Lord Ayyappa devotees wear), her forehead smeared with sandalwood paste in the Hindu tradition, and her knees pulled up in front to mimic the classic Ayyappa pose", and the complaints received by the police included that the photograph "was 'sexually explicit' and 'wounded the religious feelings of Lord Ayyappa's devotees.'" BBC News reported Fathima's friend Arathy said Fathima did not intend to hurt religious sentiments or be sexual or offensive, and asked, "What about the men who go to Sabarimala bare-chested or expose their thighs? How come that's not outrageous?"

=== Body painting video ===
In June 2020, Fathima was arrested after posting a video that The Times of India described as depicting "getting her pre-adolescent son to paint on her nude torso." Press Trust of India reported that in her bail plea to the court, she "said the allegations prima facie would not constitute any offence punishable which are non-bailable in nature," and stated "she was an activist who has been fighting a battle against body discrimination," and "that there needs to be openness so far as discussion on body and body parts are concerned." According to the Mumbai Mirror, the video was titled 'Body and Politics'.

The high court of Kerala denied her anticipatory bail application in The POCSO case against Rehana Fathima, after which she filed a special leave petition in the supreme court against the high court's decision. In August 2020 The supreme court of India denied anticipatory bail application by Rehana Fathima and quoted that she is spreading obscenity using social media. On 8 August 2020 Rehana Fathima surrendered before the circle inspector of Ernakulam Town South's police as the supreme court denied her anticipatory bail application.

=== "Gomatha Ularthu" video ===
In November 2020, the Hindustan Times reported that Kerala High Court ordered Rehana Fathima to not use the word "gomatha" (a common reference to holy or sacred cows) as a synonym for beef, because "If it is so believed by several lakhs of Hindus throughout the country, definitely, the use of the term gomatha as a synonym for meat used in a cookery show, prima facie, is likely to wound the religious feelings of those believers," according to the court. Fathima was heard repeatedly referring to meat as "gomatha" after she posted a cooking video on social media in May 2020 titled "Gomatha Ulurthu" and referred to beef as "gomatha". In February 2021, the Supreme Court granted a partial stay to the Kerala High Court order that restrained Fathima "from publishing, transmitting, sharing, uploading or disseminating any material or comments through any public visual and electronic media, but directed that the prohibition on her spreading any comment that may affect religious sentiments will continue," according to The Indian Express.

== Personal life ==
Rehana Fathima's other name is Surya Gayatri. She has two children.
