= Shikharji movement =

Series of protests in India

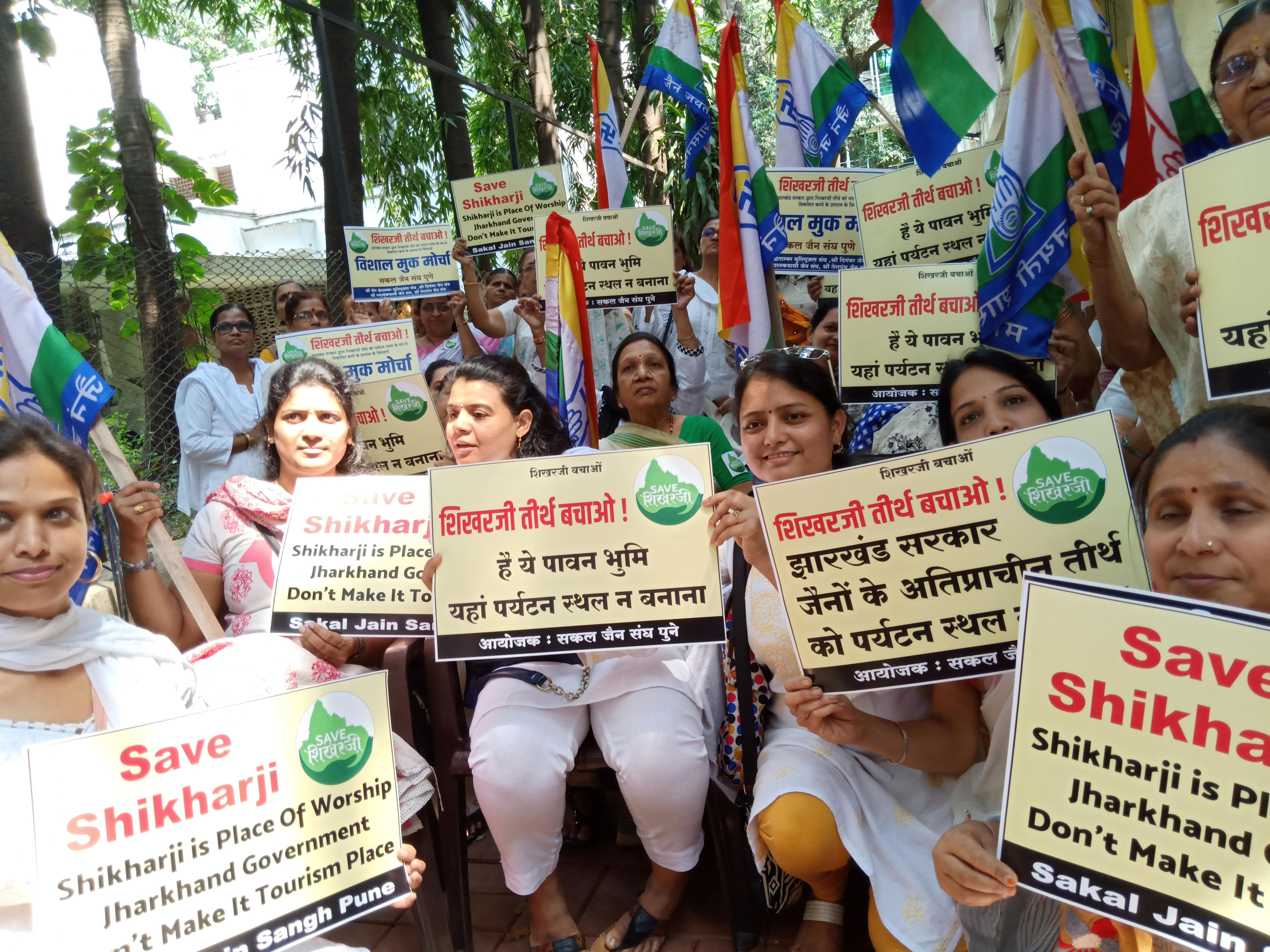
Save Shikharji Movement

Shikharji Movement comprises series of protests, rallies and fasting to death organised by Jain community to protest against state and central government of India's intervention on the sacred hill of Shikharji Non-violent protests & nationwide rallies have been organised & two Jain monks have died while fasting to death to protest any tourism activity on the hill. The movement was initiated by Shwetambara Jain monks against recent infrastructure development initiated by the existing Government's actions, which Jains believe, has severely affected the sanctity of the Shikharji Hill. This Movement is unitedly led by Jains of all sects (Shwetambara, Digambara, Sthanakvasi and Terapanthi).

Through this movement, the Jains want the Shikharji Hill to be declared as a 'Place Of Worship', by the concerned authorities of the Govt. Shikharji Tirth is regarded as the most sacred place of worship for the Jains. Jains opposed the plans of the state government to improve the infrastructure in the hill to boost tourism as alleged attempts to commercialize the Shikharji hill.

On 26 October 2018, the Government of Jharkhand issued an official memorandum declaring the Shikharji hill as a 'place of worship'. The movement has got support across the political spectrum with major political parties & leaders supporting it.

== History of Shikharji ==
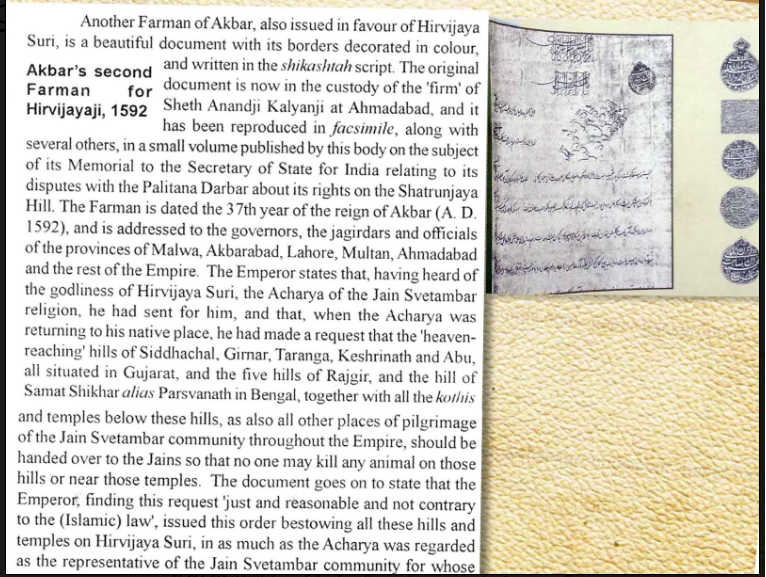
Farman issued by Emperor Akbar which considered Shikharji as a Place of Pilgrimage

The modern history records show that Shikharji Hill is regarded as the place of worship of the Jain community. During the regime of Mughal's rule in India, Emperor Akbar in the year 1583 had passed an official order (farman) granting the management of Shikharji Hill to the Jain community to prevent the slaughter of animals in the vicinity. The farman had recognised the sovereign ownership of jain sangh over the hills through Spiritual Sovereign Jainacharya Heervijaysuri as representative of Jain Sangh.

== Bihar Land Reform Act Impact ==
This Act came into force on 25/09/1950 by Bihar Government of India. As per this Act, all the proprietors, mortgagees, lessees and tenure-holders in land, including interests in trees, forests, fisheries, jalkars, ferries, hats, bazaars, mines and minerals have to be transferred it to the State Government With the help of this act, the state government of Bihar on 02/05/1953 issued a notification under Section 3(1) of the Bihar Land Reforms Act that the entire Shikharji Hill will hence forth be rendered as state's property. Jains believe as a fall out of this newly enforced act, activities like Tree Plantation, Pig farming, Cultivations, Building of Sanatorium, Helipad, tourist resorts etc. could find a way to flourish on the Holy Hill. Despite a clear mention of the following point in chapter I, section 4 (f) of the Bihar land reforms act- " ….nothing contained in this clause ….authorize the Collector to take charge of any institution, religious or secular…….."

== Recent Government Activities On The Hill ==
The Govt. has carried out various activities listed below.

- With Tourism flourishing in India, Govt. wants Shikharji to be developed as a Tourist destination.
- Government declared that Marang Buru temple is to be constructed on this particular Hill and not on any other place.
- Construction of helipad on the hill.
- Construction of Tree House and Cottages.

There are inhibitions of the Jain community that developing the hill into a tourist place will attract a lot of other social and cultural evils. Hotels, motels, non veg food, hunting, gambling, prostitution, adultery etc. may become rampant in times to come. On 22 September 2015, the Government released a press note stating that it shall focus on developing the hill as an International spiritual centre for peace and enlightenment. This press release of Government was prompted because a delegation of the Jains’ had gone to protest against the prospective idea of the Government to build a Helipad. When the delegation pointed out their concerns for such a step, Government retracted and agreed in principle to withdraw its development plans and instead decided to glorify the sacredness of the hill. On 27 December the CM reiterated the above actions which will be taken by this government. However, Government chose to construct the helipad and built barracks for military.

=== Eco sensitive zone notification ===
On 5 January GOI stayed the implementation of Clause 3 of the Eco Sensitive Zone Notification S.O.2795(E) dated 2 August 2019 after a meeting with Jain community members

== Protest by Jains ==
All the sects of the Jains’ consider this hill as the most sacred place. Protests across the country from the people of Jain community have taken place in the form of on/off line petitions addressed to the PM and the CM of Jharkhand state. Protest rallies, congregations and protests on social media were organised Jains.

The protests, started in 2018, were against the secular and religious conversion of Shikharji Hills and promotion of commercial activities, all of which are repugnant to the Jain religion.

In addition, another parallel campaign was initiated by Jain Media in 2021 to declare Shikharji as a "Holy City." Jyot organisation considers this campaign untimely, misleading, lacking vision and clarity and ambiguous because it does not focus on the desired outcome of maintaining the sanctity and Jain character of the Hills. The organisation expects Jain Media to rectify the campaign and focus on appropriate issues by raising the existing demand of declaring the entire Shikharji Hill as a Place of Worship of Jains.

== Government’s Response ==
On 10 October 2018, government orally assured that it will not construct any other structure on the hill which will affect sanctity of Jains. However, Jains are still demanding a written statement from the concerned authorities declaring Shikharji as a place of worship, as they believe they have been betrayed by giving oral assurances earlier by the government. On 26 October 2018, the Government of Jharkhand issued an official memorandum declaring the Shikharji hill as a 'place of worship'.
