= Suhas Wadkar =

Indian politician

Former Deputy Mayor of Mumbai
- In office 22 November 2019 – 7 March 2022
- Preceded by: Hemangi Worlikar

Personal details
- Citizenship: Indian
- Party: Shiv Sena

Suhas Wadkar is an Indian politician served as a Deputy Mayor of Brihanmumbai Municipal Corporation, which is India's richest municipal corporation. He was elected as Deputy Mayor of Mumbai without any opposition.
