= Suhasini Raj =

Indian journalist

Suhasini Raj is a journalist based in India. At Cobrapost she conducted Operation Duryodhana, aired on Aaj Tak news channel in India on 12 December 2005, wherein she bribed eleven members of the Indian Parliament to ask questions in Parliament that were ostensibly meant to be lobbying for small scale industries. Currently she works with the south Asia bureau of The New York Times in Delhi.

On October 18, 2018, Suhasini Raj attempted to visit the Sabarimala which is a famous Ayyappa pilgrim centre located in Kerala. It was following the Supreme Court verdict to allow entry of all women to Sabarimala irrespective of age. However devotees stopped her midway with prayer chants as it was against Sabarimala tradition for ladies between 10 and 50 years of age to enter Sabarimala, and she was escorted back down hill. She alleged that the protesters manhandled her and pelted her with stones. She is facing online abuse and threats ever since the incident.
