= Achankovil =

River in India

Achankovil River Achankovil aar
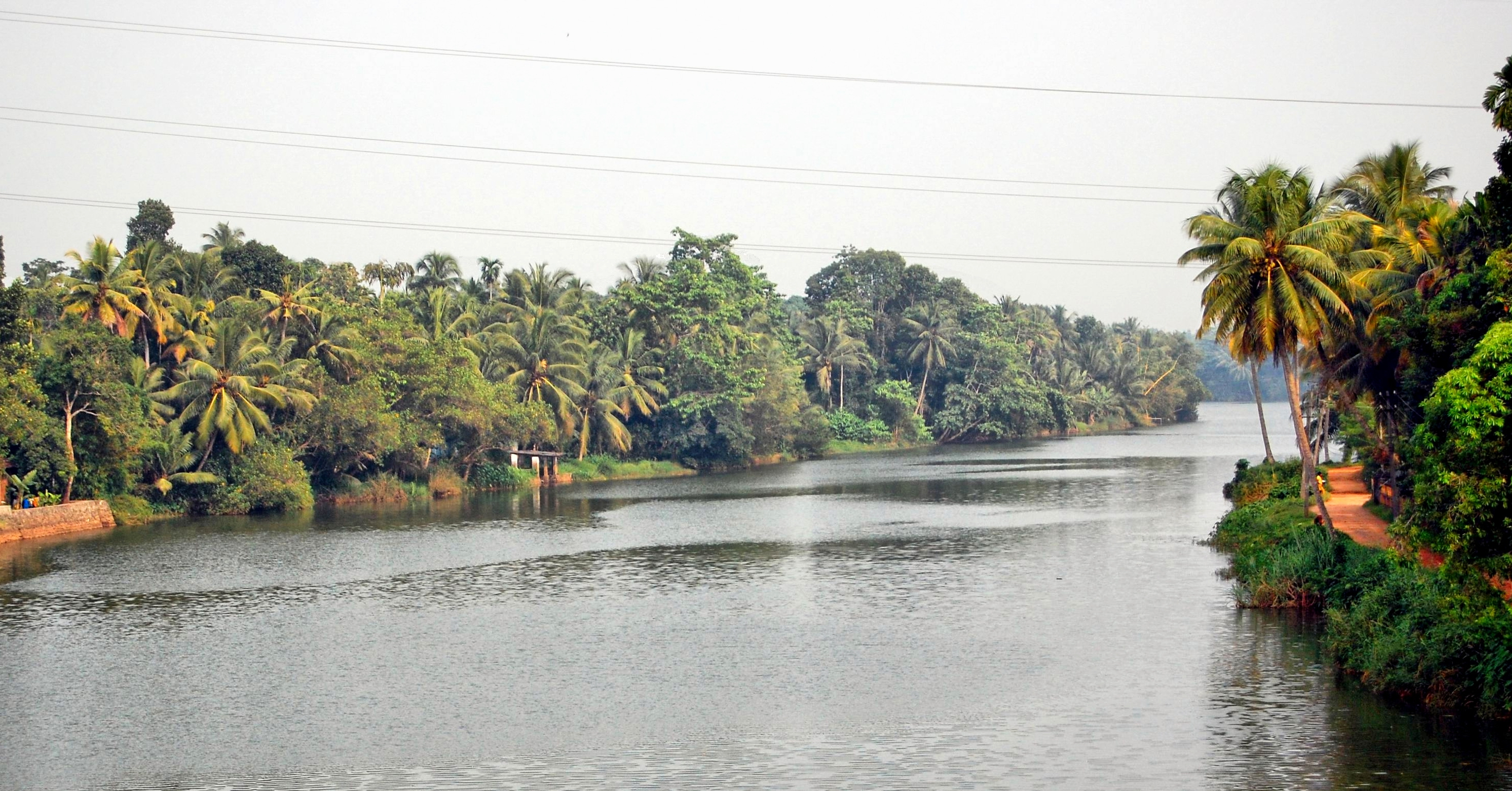

- Location of the mouth in Kerala Achankovil (India)
- Native name: അച്ചന്‍കോവിലാറ് (Malayalam)

Location
- Country: India
- State: Kerala
- Districts: Kollam, Pathanamthitta, Alappuzha
- Cities: Konni, Pathanamthitta, Pandalam, Mavelikkara,

Physical characteristics
- Source
  - location: Pasukidamettu, Rishimalai and Ramakkalteri rivers originating from Devarmalai of Western Ghats
  - elevation: 700 m (2,300 ft)
- Mouth: Pamba
  - location: Veeyapuram
  - coordinates: 9°19′0″N 76°28′0″E
- Length: 128 km (80 mi)
- Basin size: 1,484 km^{2} (573 mi^{2})

Basin features
- Landmarks: Thazhoor Bhagavathy Kshetram, Thrippara Shiva temple, Valamchuzhy Devi Kshetram, Pandalam Valiyakoickal Sastha temple, Pandalam palace,(Mattom mahadeva temple), Pandalam Mahadeva temple, Kandiyoor Mahadeva temple, Chettikulangara Devi temple, Venmani Sargakavu temple, Konni Muringa Mangalam Mahadeva temple
- Bridges: Kaippattor bridge, Pandalam bridge, Vettiyar bridge, Parakkadavu Bridge, Pulakadavu bridge, Chamakkavu pedestrian bridge, Kollakadu bridge, Valiyaperumpuzha bridge, Prayikkara bridge, Pottamelkkadavu bridge, Konni Bridge

Achankovil is a 128 km (80 mi) long west flowing river in Kerala, India. It flows through the districts of Kollam, Pathanamthitta and Alappuzha. The river drains vast tract of fertile plains of Upper Kuttanad in the Alappuzha and Pathanamthitta districts. It also sustains numerous urban settlements along its course such as Konni, Pathanamthitta, Pandalam and Mavelikkara.

== Course ==
The river has its origin in Devar Mala peak of the Western Ghats situated in the Konni Reserve Forest. Rivers like Rishimala, Pashukidamettu and Ramakkaltheri form the major tributaries of the Achenkovil river. It flows south west from its origin and enters Kollam district near Achencovil village. Then the river switches its course towards north west and flows almost 20 kms through Kollam district before re-entering Pathanamthitta district near Kalleli.

Later it flows through the hilly towns of Konni, Kumbazha, Mylapra, Konnithazham, Vettoor, Pathanamthitta, Pramadam, Vallikode and enters into the Upper Kuttanad. Then the river passes through the towns of Kaipattoor, Nariyapuram, Thumbamon, Venmony, Kulanada, Pandalam, Edappon (Nooranad), Vettiyar, Kollakkadavu and Cheriyanad. After reaching Mavelikkara, the river takes a sharp turn towards the northern direction and flows through the following towns of Chennithala, Pallippad, Paippad and finally merges into the Pamba river at Veeyapuram. The Pamba River together with Achankovil and Manimala rivers, then splits into two distributaries, one which empties into the Arabian Sea at Thottapally and the other into the Vembanad Lake at Kainakary.

The Pathanamthitta Town, which is the administrative capital of the Pathanamthitta district is situated along the river. The town derives its name from its association with the river; Pathanamthitta, from the Malayalam words pathanam and thitta, means "houses by the riverside".

== Achenkovil village and reserve forest area ==
The forest area, which is the catchment area for this river is also referred to as Achenkovil Reserve Forest. It forms part of Agasthyamala Biosphere Reserve.

A small village situated in its upper riparian area of the river is called as Achenkovil village. The Achenkovil village is an important pilgrimage center which is associated with the legend of Sabarimala and it is also one of the important interstate border point between Kollam district and Tenkasi district.

== Achankovil Sastha Temple ==
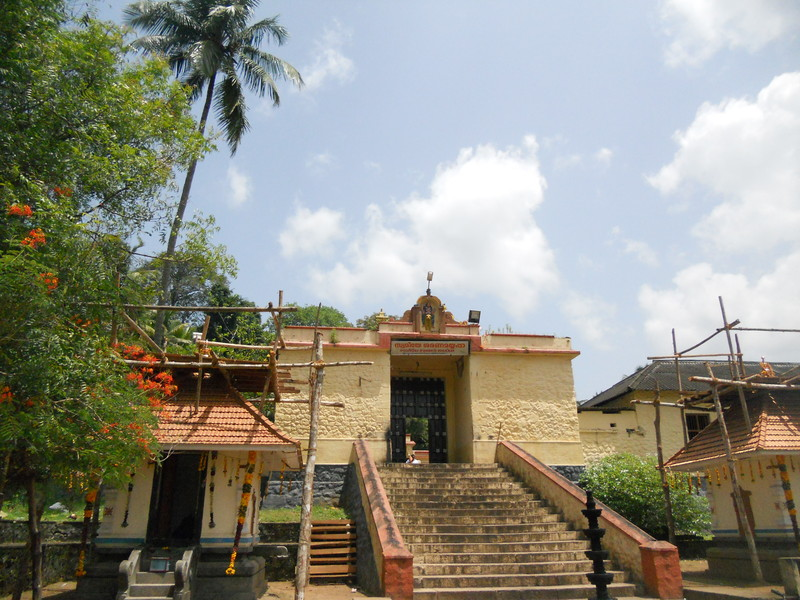
Achankovil temple

Achankovil Shastha Temple, or the Dharmasastha Temple, is one among the five important temples dedicated to Lord Ayyappa in Kerala. Lord Ayyappa leads the Grihastha Ashrama life here – he is depicted as a family man or leads married life here. He is depicted along with his two wives – Purna and Pushkala. It is believed that the idol here was installed by Parashurama.

The Achankovil Sastha Temple is famous for curing poisonous snake bites. The left hand of the idol of Ayyappa at Achankovil Shastha Temple always holds ‘Chandan’ (sandalwood paste) and Thirtha (holy water). The Chandan and Thirtha are considered to have medicinal properties to cure snake bites. The temple complex also contains other deities associated with the Ayyappa legend. The festivals and rituals held here have strong Tamil roots.

During the Sabarimala pilgrimage, devotees also visit this temple to offer their prayers. It is believed that the idol of this temple was consecrated by Sage Parasurama. On both sides of the idol, Poorna and Pushkala, the consorts of Lord Sastha are also installed. The most important festival here is celebrated from the first to tenth day of Malayalam month Dhanu (December – January).

== Achenkovil shear zone ==
In geology it is a major crustal discontinuity of Proterozoic age which separates Kerala Khondalite Belt (KKB) in the south (Trivandrum Block) from the Charnockite massif in the north (Madurai Block). The Achankovil river drains this structural valley. There are geologists who argue that this shear zone is a vital link that bears imprints of land connection between India and Madagascar when both this land masses were part of Gondwanaland.

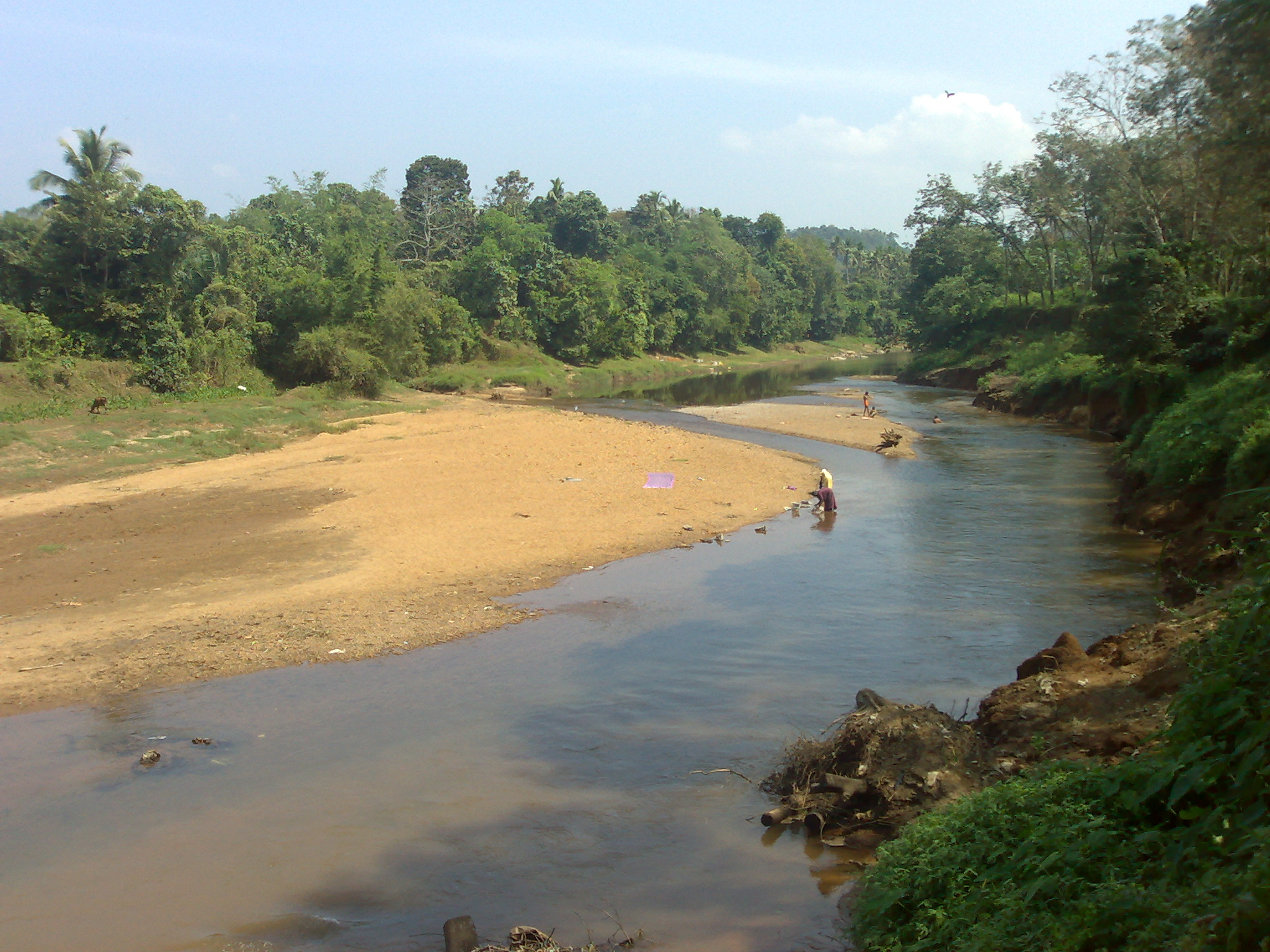
Achankovil river near Kaipattoor

== Attractions ==
The river is unique in that along its route is a large number of ancient temples, indicating that the richness of the river basin has been identified by humans since ancient times and they preferred to settle down there so that they could grow their crops on the fertile lands.

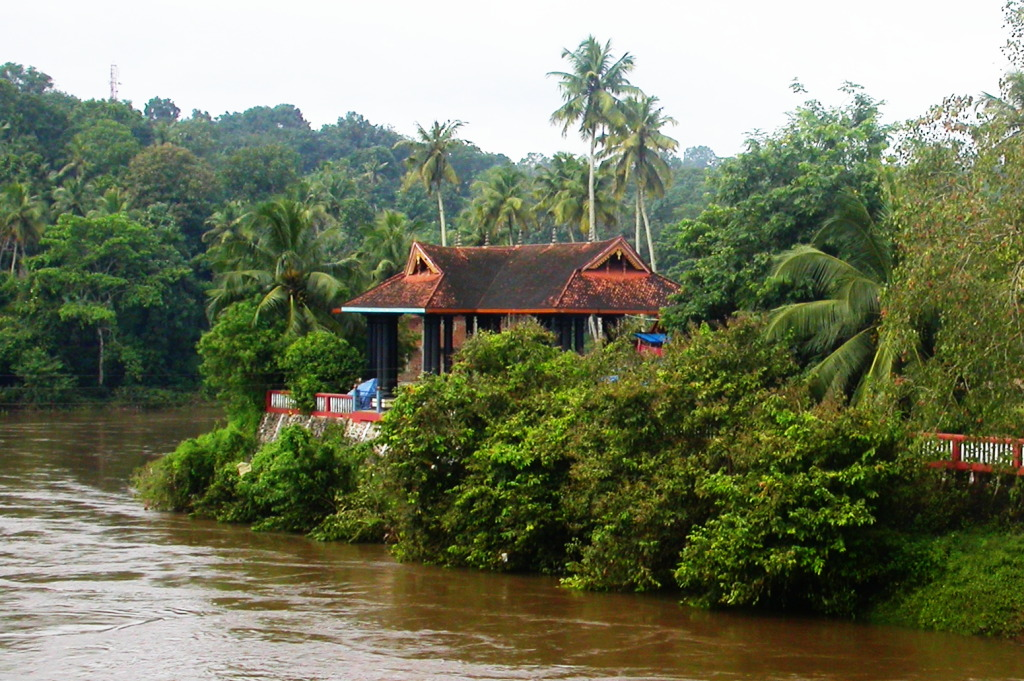
Thazhoor Bhagavathy Kshetram Temple on the banks of River Achankovil - View from Thazhoor bridge

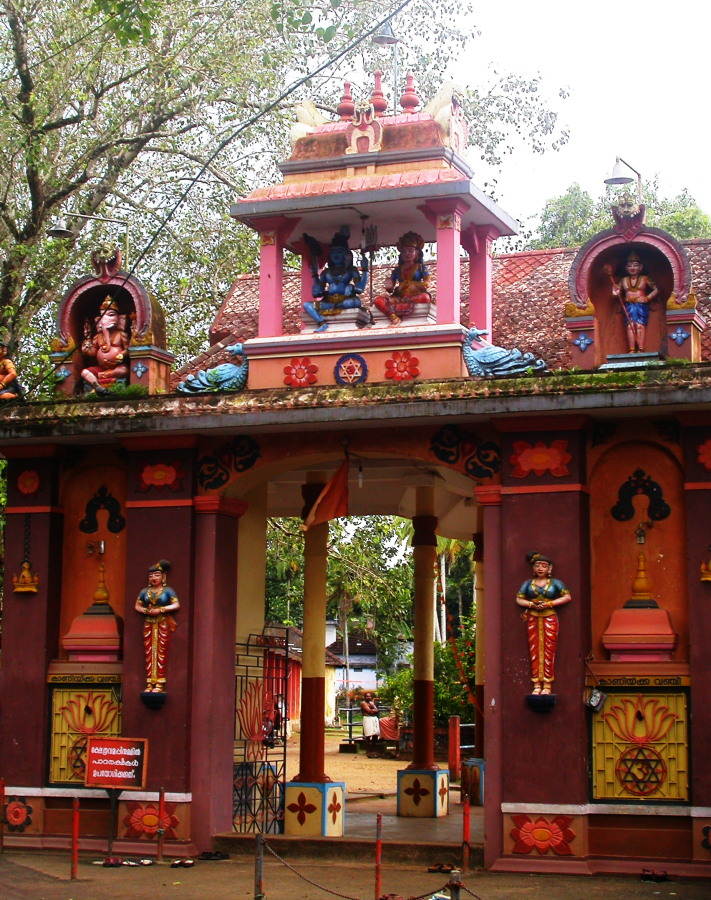
Entrance to Thrippara Shiva Kshetram on the banks of River Achankovil
- The Karingalichal wetlands spread over Pandalam Municipality, Nooranad and Palamel Panchayaths, a place famous for its flora and fauna, is on the banks of the Achankovil river.
- The river basin had active Buddhist settlements in the Middle Ages. The present day Chamakkavu Sharngakavu Devi Temple near Venmony a Hindu Temple, was a Buddhist place of worship, which was transformed initially into a Vishnu temple (then known as Sharnga-kavu) and later into a Devi temple. The annual chariot festival and other traditions correspond to the old Buddhist practices of "kettu kazhcha", which was assimilated into Hinduism in Kerala. The Karumadikkuttan statue and Buddhist relics found near Mavelikkara further underscores this.
- Kumbhavurutty Waterfalls in Kollam district is in the upper course of the river.

== See also ==
- Kallada River
- Kulathupuzha Sastha Temple
- Aryankavu Sastha Temple
- Buddhism in Kerala
