= Ready To Wait campaign =

Social movements

The Ready To Wait campaign is a social movement initiated in September 2016 by a group of female devotees of Hindu deity Ayyappan, as a response to a petition filed in the Supreme Court by women's groups to demand the right to enter the Sabarimala temple, located in the southern Indian state of Kerala, which traditionally restricts entry of women of reproductive age (10 to 50 yrs). The campaigners of "Ready To Wait" asserted their willingness to respect the traditions regarding entry to the Sabarimala temple. It started as a social media campaign with the hashtag #ReadyToWait and soon gained momentum as Hindu women from all over the country took to social media to show their support.

The women devotees eventually petitioned the Supreme Court to intervene in the pending litigation on Sabarimala temple entry for women of a certain age, through "People for Dharma", a Chennai-based organization. The lawyer for "People for Dharma", J Sai Deepak argued for the rights of Ayyappan, the deity of Sabarimala temple as a distinct legal personality for which he received praise by the Supreme Court of India. On 28 September 2018 Indian Supreme Court ruled in favor of the petitioners allowing entry of women in Sabarimala temple with a 4:1 majority with the only female judge, Justice Indu Malhotra being the dissenting opinion. Travancore Devaswom Board is expected to file an appeal against this decision.

== Background ==
According to the legend, Ayyappan, the main deity of the Sabarimala temple, has taken a vow to remain in the state of naiṣṭhika-brahmacarya (eternal celibacy) in his form at Sabarimala Temple. As such the shrine restricts entry to women of reproductive age (10 to 50 yrs). This restriction was previously challenged as well, however, the Kerala High Court had upheld the restriction in its 1991 judgement. An organization called "Indian Young Lawyers Association" filed a public interest litigation in 2006 but it didn't gain national prominence until January 2016 when the Supreme Court asked the Government of Kerala and Travancore Devaswom Board to submit their response with regards to temple entry issue. The case was finally referred to a five-member bench by Supreme Court of India in October 2017. This was around the same time when the Supreme Court of India had decided to uplift the restrictions barring entry of women to Haji Ali Dargah where the petitioners had also argued that restricting entry amounts to discrimination against women.

This led to the creation of a social media campaign using the hashtag of #ReadyToWait, where female devotees of Ayyappan posted their photographs holding placards bearing the slogan #ReadyToWait. The campaign went viral within a day and was covered by mainstream media. The campaigners, led by five women devotees from Kerala, Shilpa Nair, Anjali George, Aishwarya Krishnan, Suja Pavithran, and Padma Pillai opposed this petition arguing that the restriction of entry is due to the celibate nature of the deity and therefore, not discriminatory against women. As such, respecting the traditions of the temple and the will of the deity, they are ready to wait until the appropriate age to visit Sabarimala. The campaigners also pointed out that the tradition at Sabarimala is based on the concept that Ayyappan of Sabarimala is in the form of a Kumāra (teenager) observing Brahmacharya. They contrast this form of Ayyappan from other Ayyappan temples like Kulathupuzha, Aryankavu, and Achankovil. In these other three temples, Ayyappan is in three different forms namely Bāla (child) in Kulathupuzha, Bhāryā-sameta (lit. accompanying wife) in Achankovil and Tāpasa (ascetic) in Aryankavu. These four 'pratiṣṭhas' (installations) denote the four stages of human life according to Hindu scriptures. Except in Sabarimala where Ayyappan is in his Brahmachari form, no other Ayyappan temple elsewhere restricts entry of women.

The overwhelming response to the social media campaign emboldened the organizers to file an application of intervention at the Supreme Court. People For Dharma was created as their legal entity. Their lawyer, J. Sai Deepak, appeared in the Supreme Court of India on 26 July 2018 where he argued for the rights of Lord Ayyappan as a distinct legal personality. According to Press Trust of India's report in Business Standard:

"The lawyer, who was initially granted 10-15 minutes time in the forenoon to put forth his submissions, argued for more than one-and-half hours without being asked by any of the judges to stop and was quick to respond to queries from the bench.

Arguing for the "constitutional right" of Lord Ayappan, he said the deity's will to remain celibate needed to be respected under Articles 21 (right to life and personal liberty) and 25(1) (freedom of religion) of the Constitution."

During the hearing, lawyers for the defendants pointed out that there are Hindu temples which forbid entry of men on particular days and contend that such practices are part of the history and cultural diversity of Indic Civilization that ought to be respected. Misunderstandings regarding Sabarimala are the outcome of ascribing a human form to God, they argue, and explain that Hinduism treats God as a manifestation of universal energy. The campaigners stress that there is no blanket ban on the entry of women and refute reports which claim so as motivated.

The hearing for the petition concluded on 1 August 2018 and the Supreme Court has reserved judgement on the case.

== See also ==
- Sabarimala
- Entry of women to Sabarimala
- Sabarimala Trek
