= J. Sai Deepak =

Indian Hindutva activist and litigator (born 1985)

Jayakumar Sai Deepak
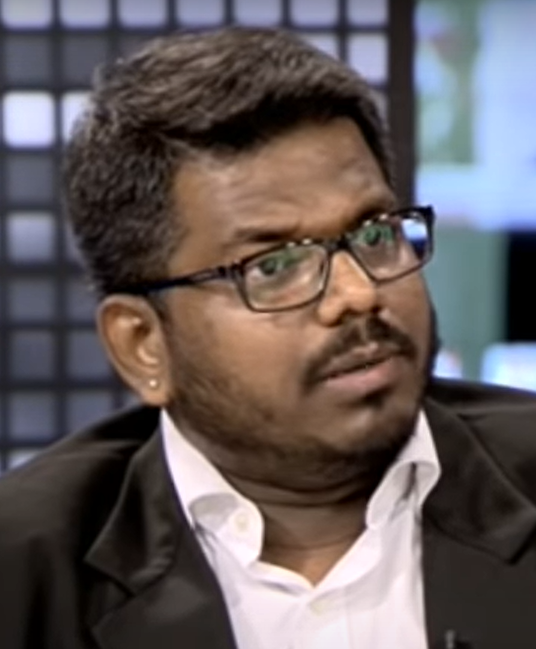
- Deepak in 2017
- Born: November 23, 1985 (age 40); Hyderabad, India
- Education: Anna University; IIT Kharagpur
- Occupations: Lawyer, writer, columnist
- Notable work: India, that is Bharat: Coloniality, Civilisation, Constitution (2021); India, Bharat and Pakistan (2022)

Jayakumar Sai Deepak (born 23 November 1985) is an Indian Hindutva proponent, lawyer, columnist and author. As a counsel, he practices before the Supreme Court of India and the High Court of Delhi. In 2024, along with 70 other advocates, he was designated as Senior Advocate by Delhi High Court.

He writes columns for The Indian Express and The Open Magazine. He has authored two books about decoloniality in relation to India: India That Is Bharat (2021) and India, Bharat and Pakistan (2022), which were criticized by scholars as regressive and right-wing.

== Early life and education ==
Deepak was born in Hyderabad in a Tamil Brahmin family. He studied at St. Anthony's High School in Hyderabad. He then graduated in mechanical engineering from Anna University and completed law from IIT Kharagpur's Rajiv Gandhi School of Intellectual Property Law.

== Career ==
Deepak has been part of Basmati Geographical Indication litigation, as the Special Counsel for the Government of Madhya Pradesh, seeking inclusion of the state as part of the Basmati Geographical Indication.

Deepak argued the case against the entry of women to Sabarimala Temple and had supported 'ready to wait' campaign. He argued against the entry, stating that the Hindu deity Ayyappan observes naishtika brahmacharya ("lifelong celibacy"). He was also a counsel in a petition to allow priests of any caste to be priests at Sabarimala, the priesthood at the temple has historically been open to only Malayali Brahmins. The Kerala High Court ruled in favor of the traditional practices.

Deepak represented the Travancore royal family for their right to manage the estates of the Padmanabhaswamy Temple in Thiruvananthapuram. The Supreme Court of India ruled in favor of the family.

Deepak was the counsel for Anand Ranganathan in the contempt of court case against the latter for endorsing the criticism of Justice S. Muralidhar by S. Gurumurthy and Vivek Agnihotri. The Delhi High Court closed the proceedings against Ranganathan.

== Views ==
Deepak wrote two blogs, one named Yukti on constitutional theory and legal philosophy; and one named The Demanding Mistress on civil, commercial and intellectual property law. An article in the latter blog was cited by the Madras High Court in its decision on the TVS Motor Company vs. Bajaj Auto Limited intellectual property dispute.

Deepak is a Hindutva activist. He believes that the several good qualities of the knowledge systems of ancient Hindu civilization, mixed with the good qualities of modern education systems, can be a template for modern Indian education systems, which he considers to have multiple drawbacks. He opposes the Dravidian movement and Periyarite thought, and claims they are Western interventions in Southern Indian societal fault lines. He has written an article, where he discussed limitations imposed by the Indian Constitution against Hindu majoritarian expression. He had criticized the provisions for Hindu majority authority being subject to judicial review and being overruled if it conflicts with constitutional morality.

Deepak has supported caste-based reservations over economic-based reservations as a form of affirmative action for historically oppressed sections. He has also argued that reservations should remain limited to the groups originally intended under the Constitution, maintained that reservations should apply only to Hindu communities, and opposed religion-based reservations as unconstitutional.

Deepak's talk on the Uniform Civil Code in Bengaluru at a Karnataka Bar Association event was faced with opposition from a group of lawyers who wanted the event to be cancelled in an attempted case of de-platforming, but it wasn't.

Deepak has participated in multiple debates, the prominent ones being with Saurabh Kirpal on same sex marriage; with S. Y. Quraishi and Manish Tewari on the Uniform Civil Code; with Shashi Tharoor on decoloniality; and with AG Krishna Menon and Sanjay Nirupam on nationalism. In 2021, during the launch of Shashi Tharoor's book ''The Battle of Belonging'', Deepak participated in a public discussion with Tharoor, distinguishing between nationalism and patriotism. Rebutting Tharoor's critiques, Deepak also argued that the common understanding of "Hindu nationalism" offers a "truncated view" of the identity. So instead, he advocated for the broader framework of 'Hindu (Dharmic) civilisationalism.' To emphasize that the Hindu civilizational identity transcends modern political boundaries and 20th-century politics, Deepak stated that he was prepared to completely discard V.D. Savarkar as its sole defining figurehead, even arguing that it is a grave injustice to the society to reduce an ancient civilization to a single individual used as a straw man. Deepak is also a frequent orator, having spoken at multiple universities, as well as at literature and cultural festivals.

== Criticism and reception ==
Scholars have been critical of Deepak's approach to Indian history, while popular reads have shown more support.

His 2021 book, India that is Bharat was described by Audrey Truschke as a "Hindu nationalist apology" and the work of a "Hindu supremacist." Specific criticisms include that Deepak uses "regressive argumentation" to justify India's currently declining democratic health, press freedom, and academic freedom. Numerous humanities scholars have commented on his inverted use of decolonial language and frameworks to legitimize the far-right ideology of Hindutva. As Mohan Dutta has put it, Deepak's approach "inverts genuine decolonization by centering elite upper-caste grievance while erasing structural violence against Dalits, Adivasis, Muslims, and other marginalized communities." Anandaroop Sen, reviewing the book, stated: "This is not scholarship about indigeneity, the nature of colonial history, etc. It is a book which feeds into a growing list of right-wing nationalist techniques deployed to gain ground electorally and intellectually."

India, that is Bharat got an appreciative review in the JMC Review in 2023 by Anupriya Aggarwal (Note: Aggarwal was identified in the review as working on aircraft interiors). Aggarwal appreciated the way Deepak analyzed the effect of colonialism on the Indian sense of their historical, cultural and constitutional identity. The book was also recognized through the SKOCH Literature Award in 2022, for its examination of India's colonial past and the influence of European intellectual traditions on the country's historical and constitutional development.

== Publications ==
=== Books ===
- India That Is Bharat: Coloniality, Civilisation, Constitution. New Delhi: Bloomsbury. 2021. ISBN 978-93-5435-249-2.
- India, Bharat and Pakistan: The Constitutional Journey of a Sandwiched Civilisation. New Delhi: Bloomsbury. 2022. ISBN 978-93-5435-301-7.

== See also ==
- Swapan Dasgupta
- Rajiv Malhotra
- Sanjeev Sanyal
- Bibek Debroy
- Vikram Sampath
