= India, Bharat and Pakistan =

- Author: J. Sai Deepak
- Language: English
- Subject: Two-nation theory, Islamic revival, Khilafat Movement, Indian constitutional history
- Genre: Non-fiction
- Publisher: Bloomsbury India
- Publication date: 2022
- Publication place: Bharat
- Media type: Print (Hardcover),eBook, audiobook
- Pages: 562-632 (varies by edition)
- ISBN: 978-9354353017
- Preceded by: "India is Bharat"(2021)

India, Bharat and Pakistan: The Constitutional Journey of a Sandwiched Civilisation is a 2022 non-fiction book by the Indian Lawyer J. Sai Deepak, published by Bloomsbury India. It is the second volume of the author's "Bharat Trilogy", following "India is Bharat: Coloniality, Civilisation, Constitution" (2021).

== Background ==
J. Sai Deepak is an engineer-turned-litigator who practises mainly before the Supreme Court of India and the Delhi High Court. He hold a mechanical engineering degree from Anna University and a law degree from the Rajiv Gandhi School of Intellectual Property Law IIT Kharagpur(2009).

The book builds on the framework of the first volume, which tries to help readers recognise European "coloniality" as a state of mind. One review notes that the first book covers 1492 to 1919, while this one covers 1740 to 1924. This volume adds a second lens, "Middle Eastern coloniality", to the European one. Later sources describe the series as extending beyond three books.

== Synopsis ==
According to the publisher, the book explores the influence of European and Middle Eastern colonialities on "Bharat", as the successor state to the Indic civilisation, and on the origins of the Indian Constitution

The central argument is that the two-nation theory is older than the 1940 Lahore Resolution. The book traces continuum of "Middle Eastern coloniality" from Islamic revivalism in the 1740s, after the decline of the Mughal Empire, to the end of khilafat Movement.
