= Ramakkalteri River =

River in India

The Ramakkalteri River (രാമക്കൽതെരി നദി) is a river of south-western India. It flows through Kerala state into the larger Achankovil River.
