= Achankovil Sastha Temple =

Hindu temple in Kerala, India

Achankovil Sree Dharmasastha Temple
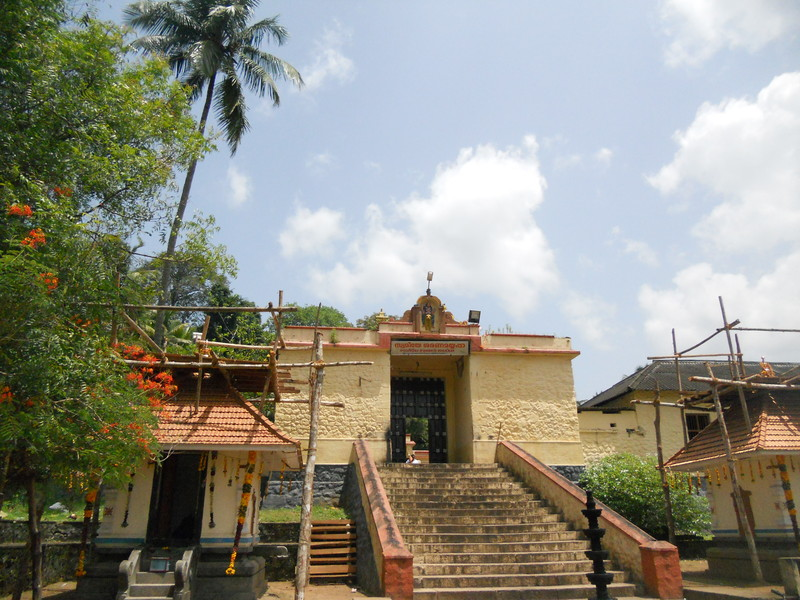
- The Temple in 2011

- Location in Kerala Achankovil Sastha Temple (India)

Religion
- Affiliation: Hinduism
- District: Kollam
- Deity: Shasta
- Festivals: Mandala Puja (December); Revathi Puja (January)
- Governing body: Travancore Devaswom Board

Location
- Location: Achankovil
- State: Kerala
- Country: India
- Coordinates: 9°05′30″N 77°07′17″E

Architecture
- Type: Dravidian architecture

Specifications
- Direction of façade: East
- Elevation: 87 m (285 ft)

The Achankovil Sastha Temple is a Hindu temple located near the banks of the Achankovil River in the Kollam district in the Indian state of Kerala. It is one of the five major temples dedicated to Shasta in Kerala, the others being Kulathupuzha, Aryankavu, Sabarimala and Kanthamala. The idol in the temple is believed to have been consecrated by Parashurama. The temple is known for curing poisonous snakebites. The Travancore Devaswom Board administers the temple.

== Location ==
The temple is located near the banks of the river Achankovil. It is situated in the panchayat of Aryankavu in the Kollam district of Kerala. The temple is situated about 50 km (31 mi) from Punalur and 85 km (53 mi) from Kollam.

== Deities ==
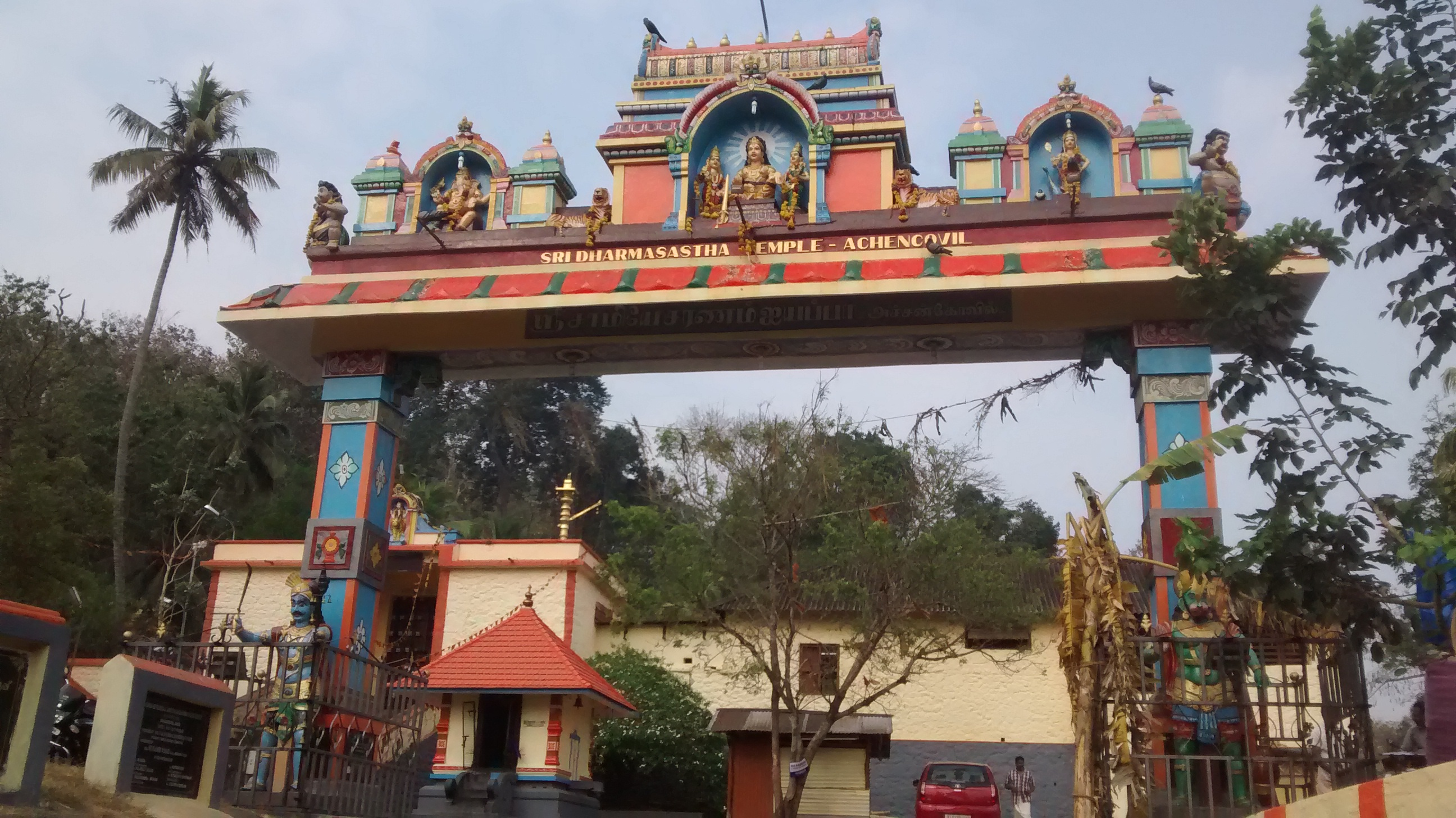
The temple arch with the sculptures of Shasta and his consorts, Purna and Pushkala, at the centre

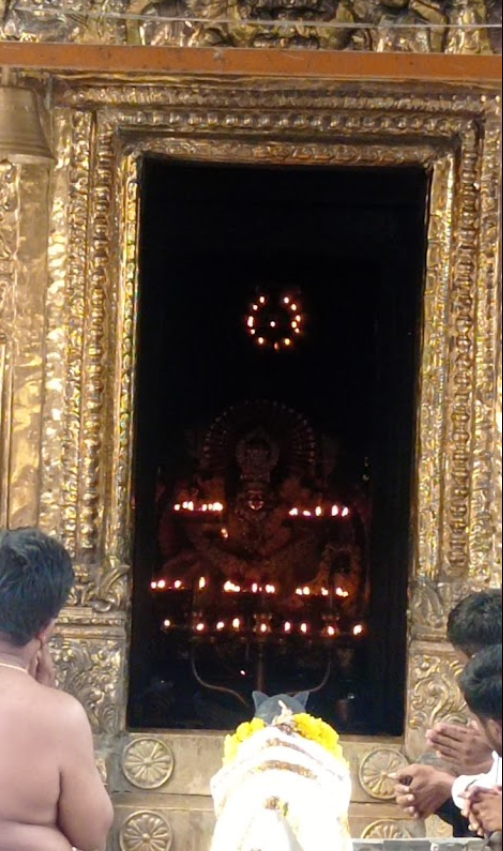
The deity, Achankovil dharmasatha

The principal deity of the temple is Shasta. He is locally known as "Achankovil Andavan" or "Achankovil Arasan". Shasta is depicted as a Gṛhastha (householder), along with his two consorts, Purna and Pushkala, on either side.

Bhagavati, Maalikapurathamma, Durga, Nagaraja, Nagayakshi, Ganesha, Kartikeya, Karuppu Sami, Karuppayi Amma, Cheppanimundan, Chappanimaadan, Madanthevan, Kalamadan, Kochattinarayanan, Singali Bhootathan and Arukola are the subordinate deities. The back portion of the temple has a Sarpa Kavu, where Naga is worshipped.

== Snakebite treatment ==
Achankovil temple is known for providing traditional treatments for poisonous snakebites, and the deity is considered a Maha Vaidya (great physician). The right palm of the Shasta holds Chandanam (sandalwood paste) and Theertham (holy water), which according to the devotees have medicinal properties. This is one of the rare temples that opens at night if necessary after the Athazha Puja. Those who get bitten by snakes can call for help at any time by ringing the temple bell, and the temple priests will help them. The person bitten by the snake is given sandalwood paste as prasadam and herbal medicine and needs to stay at the temple for three to five days, depending on the severity of the poison. Ethnobotanical research and ritual texts document that these healing practices connect to regional traditions, including medicinal plant usage by indigenous groups in the surrounding Achankovil forests alongside traditional texts detailing herbal applications, tourniqueting, and pressure techniques intended to impede venom dispersion. Traditional practices exhibit relative anecdotal success and have prompted recommendations for further scientific investigation in light of rural healthcare challenges such as healthcare worker training and limited antivenom supplies.

== Festivals ==
The Mandala Puja is one of the important festivals in the temple. It is held every year from the first to the tenth day of the Malayalam month of Dhanu (December–January). Revathi Puja is another main festival hosted in the Malayalam month of Makaram (January–February). The temple is also one of the important temples in Kerala to conduct the Therottam (chariot festival). Karuppanoottu and Karuppanthullal are the major attractions during the festival time. The festivals and rituals have similarity to the Tamil traditions.

== See also ==
- List of Hindu temples in Kerala
