= Pasukidamettu River =

River in India

The Pasukidamettu River (പശുകിടാമേറ്റ് നദി) is a river of south-western India. It flows through Kerala state into the larger Achankovil River.
