= India, that is Bharat: Coloniality, Civilisation, Constitution =

Political book by J. Sai Deepak

India that is Bharat: Coloniality, Civilisation, Constitution
- First edition
- Author: J. Sai Deepak
- Language: English
- Subject: Indian Politics
- Genre: Non-fiction
- Publisher: Bloomsbury USA, 2021
- Publication date: August 15, 2021
- Publication place: India
- Media type: Print, e-book
- Pages: 484 pages
- ISBN: 978-93-5435-249-2

India, that is Bharat: Coloniality, Civilisation, Constitution is a non-fiction book by lawyer J. Sai Deepak. It argues that colonial forms of thought continue to influence the Indian population. It talks about how British rule was not just about looting the Indian wealth or ruling over India politically, it was also about changing how Indians think about their own history, identity and systems.

== Synopsis ==
=== Colonialism vs. Coloniality ===
The book mentions the difference between the two things: colonialism and coloniality. Colonialism was the rule of British over India which ended with the Indian Independence in 1947. Coloniality however, is the western way of thinking, laws and social system that the British left behind in India. The author mentions "colonial hangover" as something which is present in India even after Independence. The government, courts and education system follow the western ideas which removes the indigenous roots of India.

=== Civilisation ===
Venkataraman Ganesan from INDIAFACTS writes that, "Section two of the book, titled “Civilisation,” strives to demonstrate how Bharat’s consciousness was impacted during the nation’s prolonged tryst with colonialism, coloniality, and colonization."

He adds, "The British, Sai Deepak argues, proceeded to systematically promulgate a series of statutes and laws, which while outwardly had a veneer of liberalism, were in fact devious mechanisms to strip the last vestiges of indigeneity characterizing the fabric of pre-colonial India. Even after independence, the burnished language of colonial-era liberalism remained intact. Justifying the encroachment into Indian land and usurpation of sacred Indian territory by the adventurous Chinese, the first Prime Minister of India, Jawaharlal Nehru, incredulously remarked that the land annexed by the Chinese was where not a single blade of grass grew and constituted territory that was useless and uninhabitable. There cannot be a more searing example of the sacred land ontology being elided out of Indian consciousness."

=== Constitution ===
The final part of the book talks about The Government of India Act, 1919, the legislation with the motive of creating a way for self-governance. INDIAFACTS reports, "The Montagu-Chelmsford Reforms in fact had the temerity to propose that unless and until India confirmed to a set of universalized tenets (assumed to be a vital pre-requisite for a “civilized” nation), it would be deemed “unready” for self-governance. This preposterous notion received a stinging rebuke from the feisty freedom fighter, Lala Lajpat Rai."

This part of the book talks about recent developments such as The Sabarimala Temple Judgement (2018), the abrogation of Article 370 of the Indian Constitution (2019), enactment of the CAA/NRC legislation (2019), and The Ayodhya Verdict (2019).

=== Decoloniality ===
The author states that, "we need decoloniality, which means we must actively wash the western lens from our minds." He wants "Bharat" to be a thousand year old civilization instead of a country that was newly independent and born in 1947.

== Reception ==
Manik Sharma of Firstpost wrote, "Lawyer and thinker J Sai Deepak in his book India, that is Bharat: Coloniality, Civilisation, Constitution argues that while the colonization of the Indian landscape may have been reversed, the minds continue to be possessed, and ultimately handicapped by a historical narrative that the outsider set for us".

According to Firstpost, "In India, that is Bharat, Deepak explores the underpinnings of the idea of Bharat, by first travelling into history to excavate the corrosion of the idea, then as lawyers do, offering evidence of its sustenance and subsequently paving the way for a decolonized interpretation of the constitution. The first half of the book traces the history of the Indian conscience as it was bruised and moulded by the intervention of the foreign."

Aditya Rawat in his Comparative Constitutional Law and Administrative Law Journal argues that the book's decolonial framework is incongruent with the Indian values.
