= Kulathupuzha Forest Museum =

Museum in India

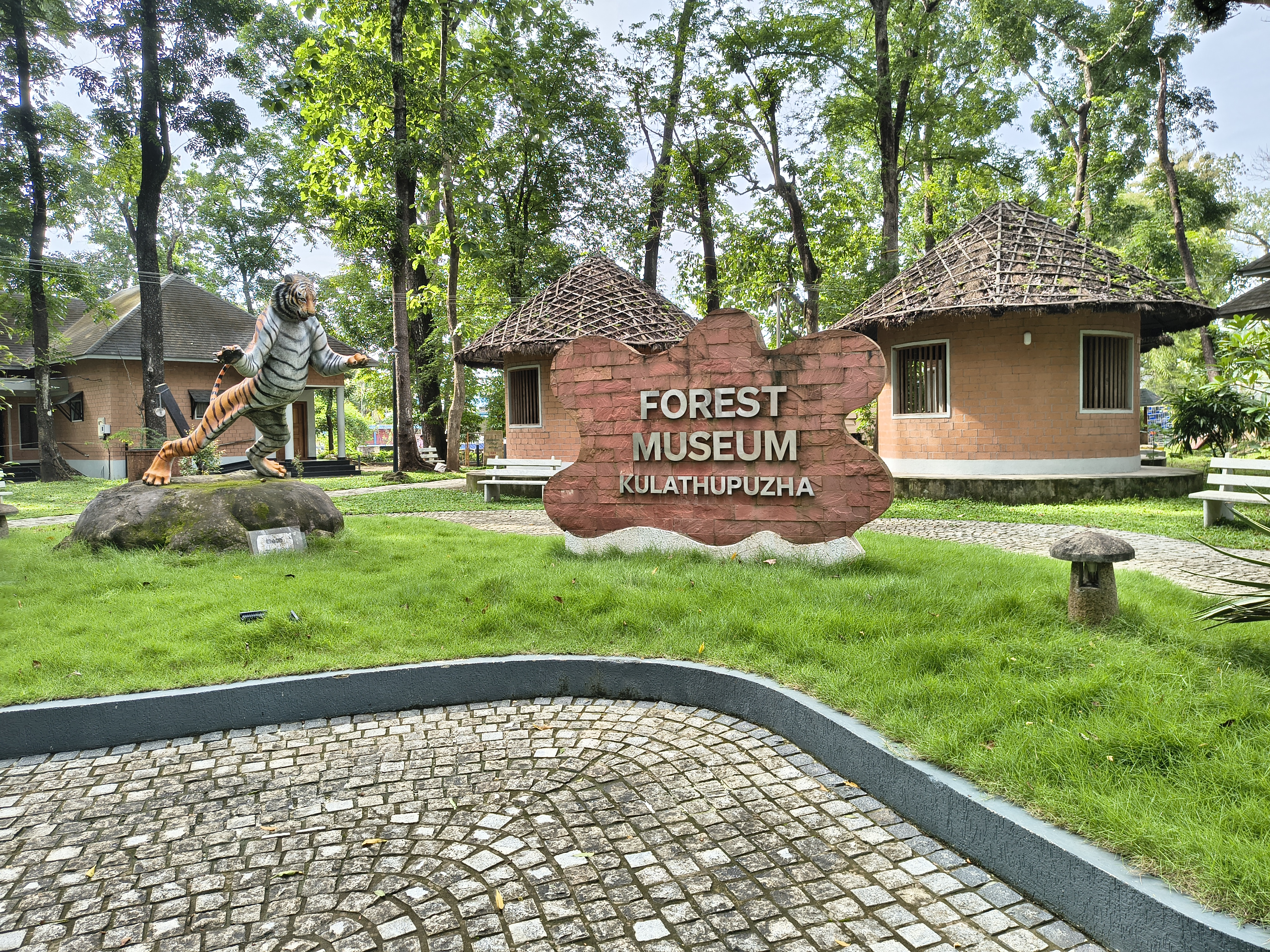
- Established: August 18, 2023; 2 years ago
- Location: Kulathupuzha, Kollam district, Kerala, India
- Coordinates: 8°54′21.63″N 77°3′25.95″E
- Type: Forestry Museum
- Owner: Kerala Forest Department

Kulathupuzha Forest Museum is a museum in India. It is located in Kulathupuzha in Kollam district of Kerala. It is the first and largest forest museum in Kerala.

== Overview ==
The Kulathupuzha Forest Museum is set on 3.3 acres of land under the Kulathupuzha Forest Office Range. There is a small forest near the museum on the banks of the Kulathupuzha river (a tributary of Kallada river). The museum is set up in such a way that visitors can experience the same sounds and lights that they would experience while walking through the forest. Located in Kulathupuzha in Kollam district of Kerala, this museum also allow visitors to view different models of forests, different animal sculptures, samples of forest resources and timber species, and samples of tribal heritage of Kerala. Another attraction is the virtual zoo, created using artificial intelligence and virtual reality. The museum complex, which has five exhibition halls, also includes facilities such as a children's playground, food court, eco shop, and guest house.

It is the first forest museum in Kerala. It is also the largest forest museum in Kerala.

The museum, which is under the Kerala Forest Department, is managed by the Thiruvananthapuram Forest Development Agency.

== History ==
The first phase of the forest museum, which was approved by the government in 2017, was completed in 2021 with an allocation of Rs 9.85 crore under the Eco-tourism project. Of the total cost, Rs 5.48 crore was spent on the construction of buildings and Rs 4.37 crore on the exhibition materials and the accompanying sound and lighting. Then Kerala Forest Minister A. K. Saseendran inaugurated the museum and opened to public in August 18, 2023.

== Aim ==
This natural history museum aims to educate people about nature, biodiversity, and culture, and to provide research opportunities.

== Location ==
Situated about 10 km from Kulathupuzha town in Kollam district, along the Thiruvananthapuram-Senkotta Interstate Highway, the Forest Museum is well connected to nearby cities by road. The nearest major railway station is Punalur railway station, which is about 27 km from the museum, while the nearest airport is Thiruvananthapuram International Airport, which is about 75 km away.

== Entry ==
The museum, which is open to the public every day except Monday from 10 am to 6 pm, has an entry fee of Rs 30 for adults and Rs 10 for children below 12 years of age and students with ID cards.

== Future development goals ==
With the first phase of museum project being a success, the Forest Department is gearing up for the second phase of development activities. In the second phase, a bathing area, seating areas, and gardens will be built on the banks of the Kulathupuzha River, which flows alongside the museum.
