= Villoo Morawala-Patell =

- Born: 18 June 1955 (age 70); Navsari, India
- Education: Osmania University, Bombay University, University of Strasbourg (University Louis Pasteur, Strasbourg), University of Ghent.
- Occupation: Chairperson of Avesthagen
- Awards: Officer of the National Order of Merit

Villoo Morawala-Patell is the founder, chairman, and managing director of the Indian biotechnology company Avesthagen.

The company raised more than 70 million USD in venture capital before largely collapsing around 2012 with a failed public offering, the exit of senior executives, the shutdown of manufacturing, and the cessation of most research activities.

Avesthagen later undertook research and development initiatives that include The 10,000 Avestagenome Project which led to the sequencing the first complete Zoroastrian-Parsi mitochondrial reference genome and genetic signatures of an endogamous non-smoking population with the hope of identifying disease specific markers in the space of cancers, neurodegenerative diseases and rare diseases.

== Life and education ==
Morawala-Patell earned a Master of Science degree in Medical Biochemistry from the University of Mumbai, then a PhD from the Institut de Biologie Moleculaire des Plantes (IBMP-CNRS), University of Strasbourg. Prior to obtaining her doctorate, Morawala-Patell worked as a research associate at ICRISAT (International Crop Research Institute for the Semi Arid Tropics (ICRISAT) for 10 years. After receiving her PhD, she returned to India, becoming a post-doctoral Rockefeller Fellow at the University of Ghent. Morawala-Patell was next a visiting scientist and Rockefeller Fellow at NCBS-TIFR, and Professor Emeritus at the University of Agricultural Sciences, Bangalore.

== Avesthagen ==
Morawala-Patell founded Avesthagen Limited in 1998. The company raised more than 70 million USD in venture capital and had more than 650 employees. The company was unable to commercialize its patents and intellectual property leading to a revenue crisis around 2012.

== Awards ==
- 2005
  - The GR8! Women Award for Science & Technology by the Indian Television Academy
- 2008
  - Officer of the National Order of Merit by the President of the French Republic
  - Recognised by the Adolfo Ibanez University for Achievements in Innovation and Creation of Value. Award was conferred upon her at the opening of VentureL@b by President of Chile, Michelle Bachelet
- 2009
  - Karmaveer Puraskar award as a Corporate Citizen for her contribution in the field of agriculture and healthcare in by iCONGO for Citizen Action and Social Justice.
  - Morawala-Patell received the prestigious the Businesswoman of the Year Award 2010 for business excellence at Satya Brahma founded Pharmaleaders 3rd Annual Pharmaceutical Leadership Summit 2010 in Mumbai.
