= Kulathupuzha =

- Village
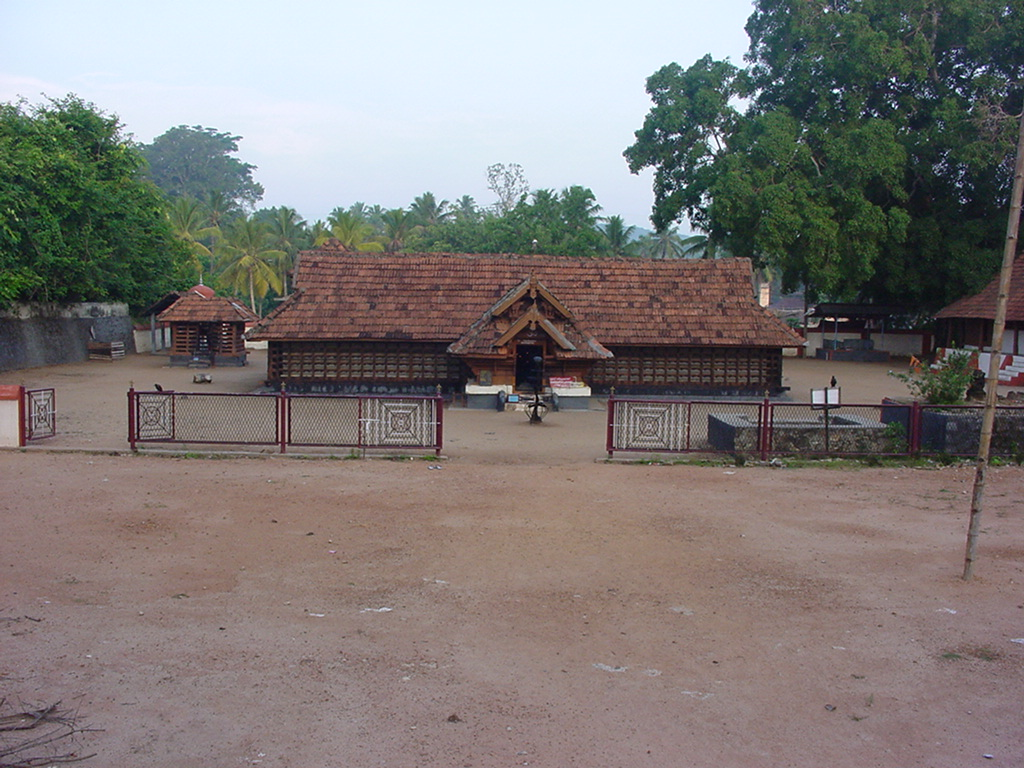
- Kulathupuzha Sastha temple

- Location in Kerala, India Kulathupuzha (India)
- Coordinates: 8.9082295°N 77.055501°E
- Country: India
- State: Kerala
- District: Kollam

Government
  - Type: Gram panchayat
  - Body: Kulathupuzha Grama Panchayat

Area
  - Total: 424.06 km^{2} (163.73 sq mi)

Population (2011)
  - Total: 34,721
  - Density: 81.878/km^{2} (212.06/sq mi)

Languages
  - Official: Malayalam, English
- Time zone: UTC+5:30 (IST)
- PIN: 691310
- Vehicle registration: KL-25
- Nearest city: Punalur
- Literacy: 86.62%

Kulathupuzha is a town in the eastern part of the Kollam district of Kerala, India. It is one of the important pilgrim spots linked with the legend of Sabarimala. It is the birthplace of the Malayalam music composer Raveendran. Kulathupuzha is the source of the Kallada River, Thenmala Dam (KIP) is located on this river. As declared by the Governor, Arif Mohammad Khan, Kulathupuzha panchayat is the first in India to have achieved constitution literacy.

== Location and connectivity ==
Kulathupuzha town is situated in Punalur Tehsil along State Highway-59 and State Highway 2 along the Kallada River. It is situated 58 km away from the district headquarters Kollam and 63 km away from the state capital Thiruvananthapuram.

Road

The town is connected with all major towns nearby by roads. KSRTC and private buses connect the town to Punalur, Kollam, Thiruvananthapuram, Ernakulam and Tenkasi. KSRTC have one of their largest depots here in Kollam District

Railway

Thenmala railway station 11 km

Airport

Trivandrum International Airport 64 km

== Attractions ==
=== Kulathupuzha Temple ===
Kulathupuzha is well known for the Kulathupuzha Sastha Temple. The deity is known as Bala Sastha (child Sastha). The Vishu Mahotsavam in April is the most important festival of this temple. The temple legend is intertwined with fishes in a nearby river.

In Napier Museum, Thiruvananthapuram there are numerous wooden carvings of Hindu mythological figures that were retrieved from Kulathupuzha.

=== High-Tech Dairy Farm ===
Hi-tech dairy farm at Kulathupuzha established by KLDB is the first hi-tech dairy farm in India under government sector. It will be a model hi-tech bull mother dairy farm with all the latest technologies on feeding, milking, shed management and recording practices as a model in the state for production of bull calves for breeding programme and supply of high producing females calves to farmers by importing Embryos, Frozen Semen, and Sexed semen. It is one of the most modern dairy farm situated in Kulathupuzha Indo-Swiss project.

=== Rehabilitation Plantation Limited ===
RPL Kulathupuzha estate is one of the largest Natural rubber estates in Kerala. It is almost 1300 Hectare vast and this project was implemented by Government of India to rehabilitate 458 Sri Lankan Refuge families.

=== Sanjeevani Kulathupuzha ===
It is a conservation site of medicinal plants managed by Kerala Forest Department, Kollam Social Forestry Division. About 400 rare, endemic and indigenous medicinal species are conserved and protected here. All the species are well labelled so as to get basic information about the plant and its usage. Ayurveda students, college students, local medical practitioners and common people can make use of this medicinal garden. Now the garden is renovated and a well organised demonstration plot is created here. Moreover, now the visitors can enjoy a one-kilometer light trekking through the natural forest which is part of the garden.

=== Kulathupuzha Reserve Forest ===
Kulathupuzha forms a part of the southernmost reserve forests of the State, falling in the SOI sheet No. 58 H/1. Kulathupuzha reserve covers an area under 1000 km^{2}. Its forest constitutes predominantly of tropical wet - and semi - evergreens and moist deciduous types. Apart from settlements, some parts are occupied by Forest departmental plantations mainly of teak, eucalyptus and acacia. The plantations are grown by planting saplings on cleared natural forests. Plantations are raised to sustain and supplement the timber needs of a few industries in the State. popularly known as the Rakoodu Estate (Rock Wood Estate) is near Kulathupuzha. Senthurini Wilde Life Sanctuary is near Kulathupuzha. Kallar estate is one of the famous tea estates leftover from British ruling times. A British bungalow is there.

Kulathupuzha forests have the largest variety of exotic Myristica Swamp freshwater variety swamp in Kerala. Besides Kulathupuzha it is found in India only at Idukki Uttara Kannada and Shivaliks Himalayas.

Also, the forest is the origin of Ithikara and Kallada rivers. Thenmala eco-tourism is just 9 km away.

=== Kulathupuzha Forest Museum ===
Kulathupuzha Forest Museum, a forestry museum here, is the first and largest forest museum in Kerala. Then Kerala Forest Minister A. K. Saseendran inaugurated the museum and opened to public in August 18, 2023.

=== Oil Palm India Limited ===
OPIL was established in the year 1977 with the objective of propagating oil palm cultivation in the country and more particularly in Kerala. From 1983 onwards the Company started functioning as a joint venture of the Government of Kerala and Government of India with share participation of 51% and 49% respectively. Oil Palm India Limited has got a total planted area of 3,646 hectares (9,010 acres) of plantation spread over in three estates – Kulathupuzha, Chithara, and Yeroor in Kollam District, Kerala.

== Economy ==
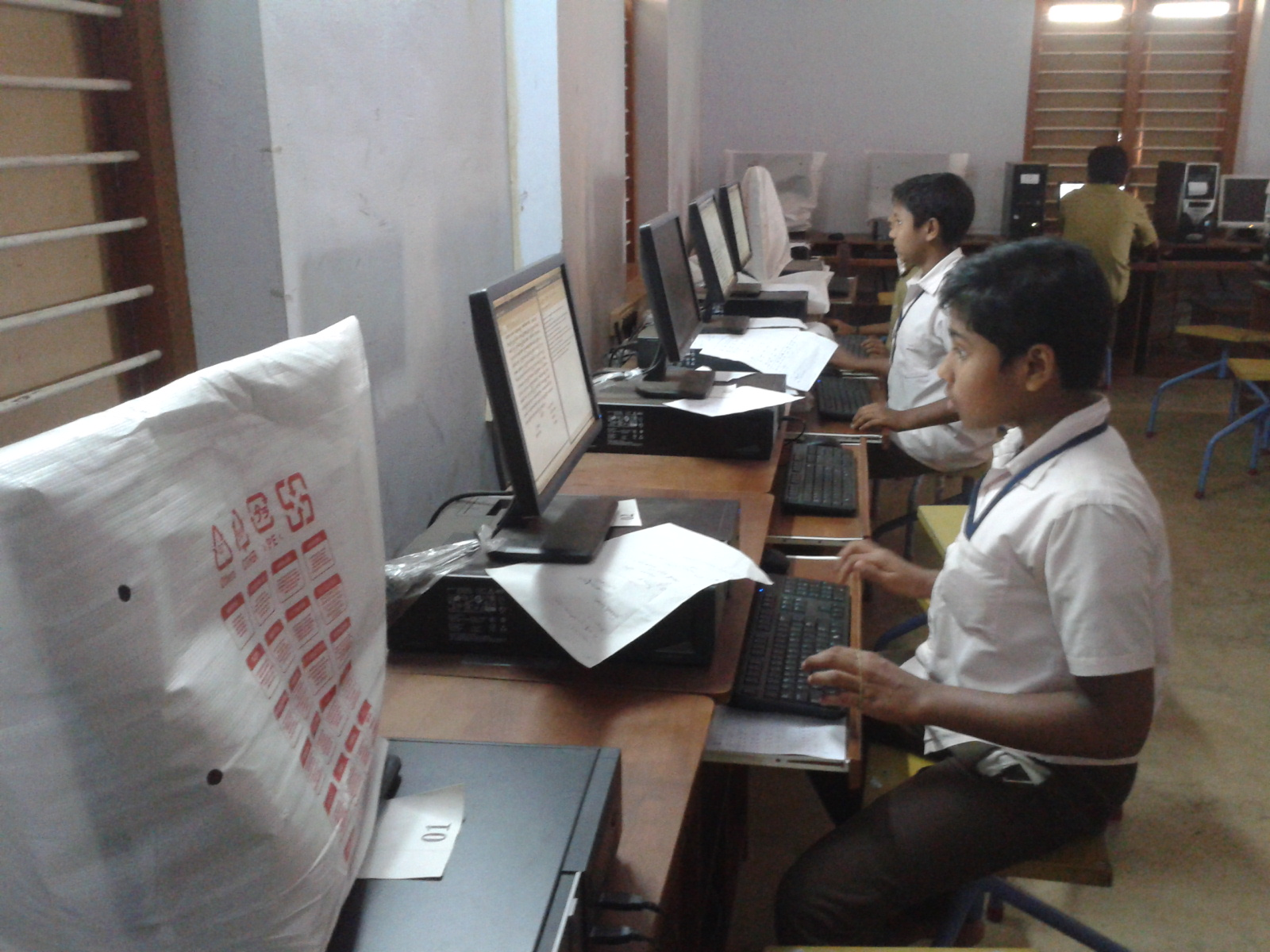
Malayalam Wiki source school students competition at samuel oomen memorial government technical high school, Kulathupuzha

The major economic activity in the area is:

- Natural rubber and Oil-palm plantations
- Agriculture and Dairy
- Timber
- Forestry
- Retail
- Tourism etc.

== See also ==
- Kulathupuzha Sastha Temple
