= Rishimala River =

River in India

The Rishimala River (ഋഷി നദി) is a river of south-western India, flowing through Kerala state into the larger Achankovil River.
