= Thotapally =

Thotapally is a developed village in Bejjanki Mandal in Siddipet district of Telangana, India. It has a library, a sub post office, a primary school, a secondary school, a hospital, a telephone exchange, an Indian bank, and an Electrical Substation.

== Notable people ==
- Party TRS
- T. Harish Rao, Former Irrigation Minister of Telangana and MLA Of Siddipet. He was born in Thotapally village. He completed his graduation, after which he entered into politics followed by the KCR. Now he is the dynamic leader in India.
- Freedom Fighter

Boinapally Venkatarama Rao is freedom fighter popularly known as Karimnagar Gandhi and "Bo Ve Ra" "బొ వె రా". He was born in Thotapally Village Mandal on September 2, 1920. He actively participated in Independence struggle Quit India movement Gram Swaraj Vandematharam and Library Movement. He donated his seven acres of land to the poor while participating Bhudan Movement.

Rao was a staunch follower of Mahatma Gandhi and his ideology. He was very much attracted to Gandhian ideology of Satyagraha, nonviolence and peace after meeting Gandhi at Kazipet Railway Station in Warangal in 1945. He operated night schools to offer education to rural men and women and conducted remarriages to several widows in Karimnagar district. Similarly, he had worked hard for abolishing social menaces: bonded labour, caste system, dowries and child marriages. He was fondly called as Thotapalli Gandhi, Karimnagar Gandhi and Telangana Gandhi.
