= Vettiyar =

- Village
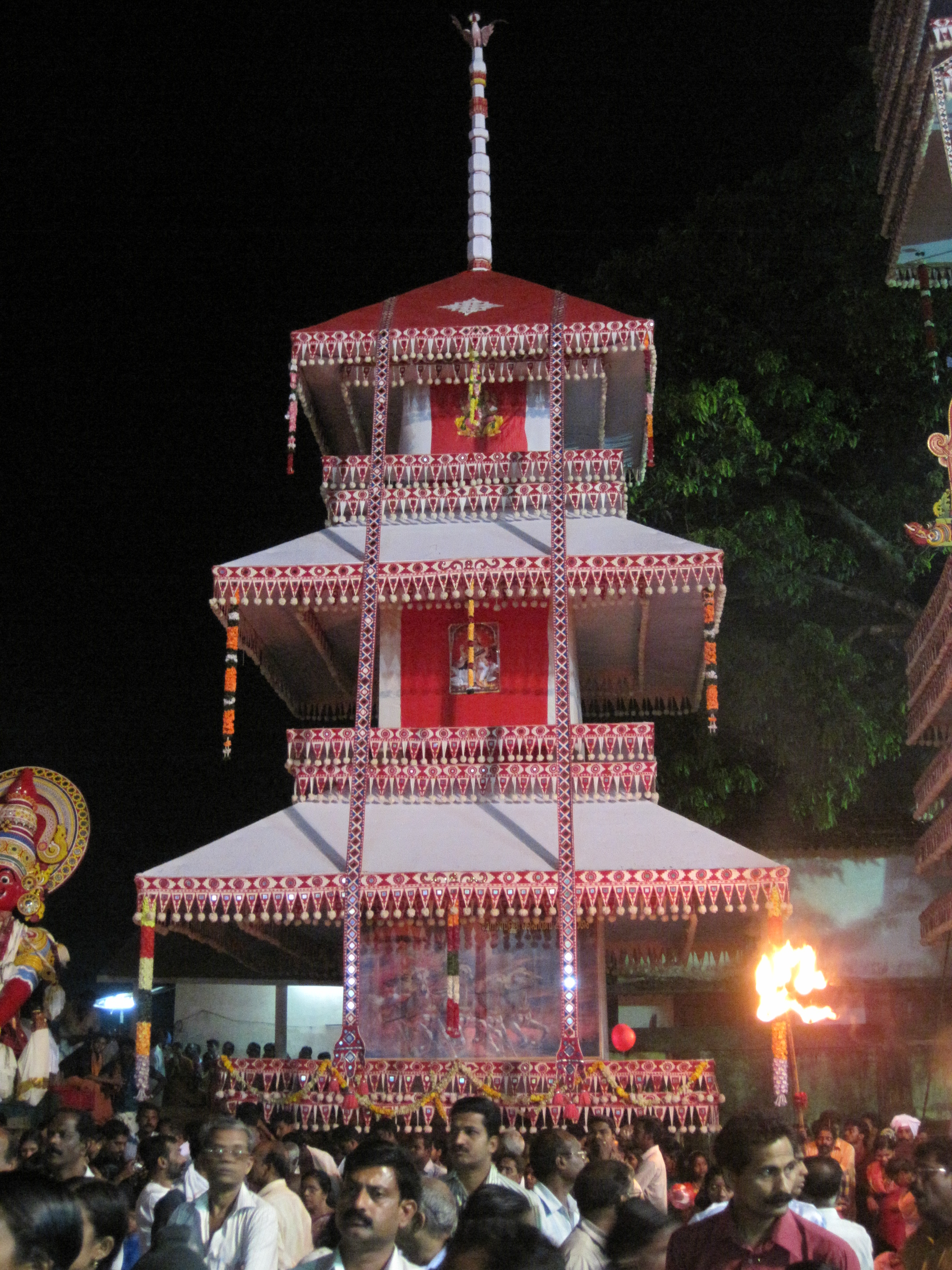

- Location in Kerala, India Vettiyar (India)
- Coordinates: 9.28°N 76.62°E
- Country: India
- State: Kerala
- District: Alappuzha
- Named for: Cutted Down River (Vettiya-Aar)

Government
  - Type: Village
  - Density: 1,300/km^{2} (3,400/sq mi)

Languages
  - Official: Malayalam, English
- Time zone: UTC+5:30 (IST)
- PIN: 690558
- Vehicle registration: KL 31 (Mavelikkara); KL 04 (Alappuzha)

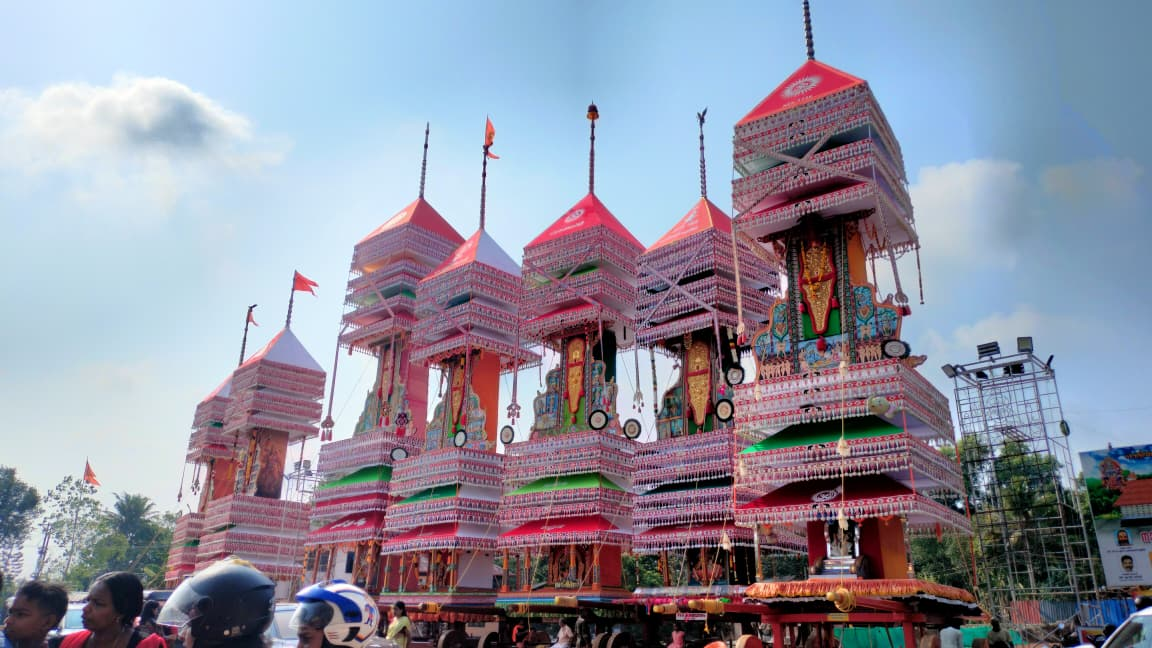
Vettiyar Palliyarakkavu Temple Pathamudayam

Vettiyar is a village located in the Onattukara Region of Alappuzha District, Kerala, India, specifically within the Thazhakkara Panchayat and Mavelikara Taluk along the Mavelikkara-Pandalam Road/State Highway-80. It lies on the banks of the Achankovil River. It is located between Mavelikkara and Pandalam. The village features famous temples, such as the Palliyarakkavu Devi Temple, which hosts the Pathamudaya festival.
