= Rajiv Gandhi School of Intellectual Property Law =

Law school of IIT Kharagpur in Kharagpur, West Bengal

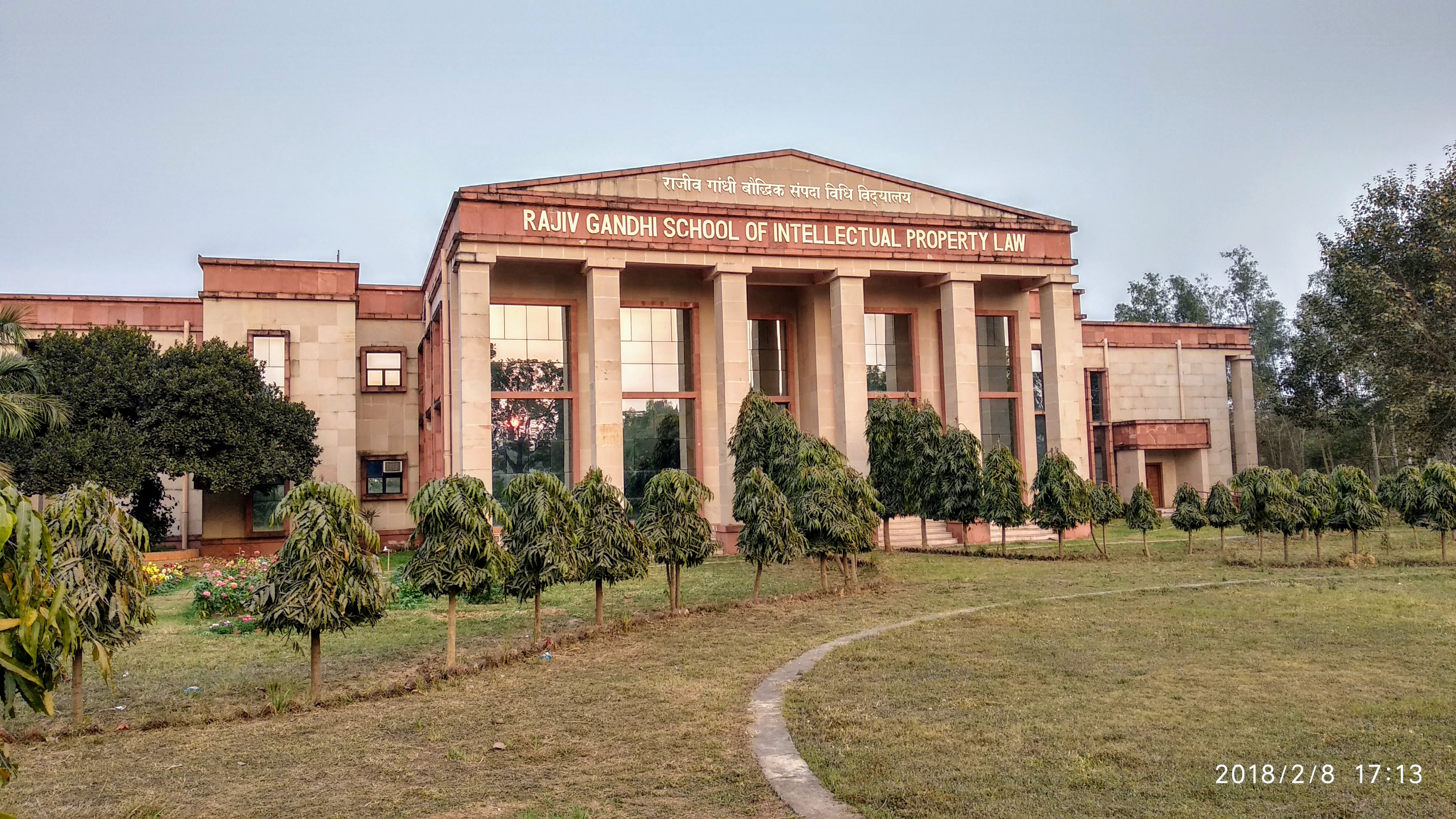
- Motto: Yogaḥ karmasu kauśalam (Sanskrit)
- Type: Public law school
- Established: 2006; 20 years ago
- Parent institution: IIT Kharagpur
- Dean: Prof.Uday Shankar Mishra
- Faculty: 13
- Students: 179
- Location: Kharagpur, West Bengal, India; 22°19′10.97″N 87°18′35.87″E
- Website: rgsoipl.iitkgp.ac.in

Rajiv Gandhi School of Intellectual Property Law, IIT Kharagpur (RGSOIPL or IIT Kgp Law School) is a law school located in Kharagpur, West Bengal, India. An academic unit of Indian Institute of Technology Kharagpur, it is the first law school to be established in an Indian Institute of Technology (IIT). It was set up in collaboration with the George Washington University Law School, Washington DC and is the only law school within the IIT system. It is also the first law school in India imparting full-time Intellectual Property education along with other regular courses prescribed by the Bar Council of India. School maintain a Legal Aid and IP Facilitation Cell to provide legal services to the needy peoples, faculty and students of the school associated with the cell provide legal aid as an enabling and outreach activity.

== Introduction ==
Rajiv Gandhi School of Intellectual Property Law, IIT Kharagpur (Hindi: राजीव गांधी बौद्धिक संपदा विधि विद्यालय भारतीय प्रौद्योगिकी संस्थान खड़गपुर) is the first of its kind law school to impart legal education with IP specialization within the IIT System bringing synergy among science, technology, management, and law. The School offers a Six-Semester, Three-Year Full-Time residential programme leading to the Degree of Bachelor of Laws (Hons) in Intellectual Property Law approved by the Bar Council of India. RGSOIPL is logistically situated contiguous to the technology and invention laboratories of IIT Kharagpur and is in close proximity with the Headquarters of the Indian Patent Office at Kolkata. The first batch graduated in May 2009. In addition to that, two batches of the erstwhile PGDIPL programme (discontinued since 2008) which was offered at Kolkata campus of IIT Kharagpur, have also graduated. The institute recently churned out its first Ph.D. in IP Law.

== History ==
The school is the brainchild of Mr. Vinod Gupta, CEO of InfoUSA and Life Fellow of IIT Kharagpur, who proposed its setting-up on 28 March 2005 and also promised a grant of one million US dollars to that end. The Ministry of Human Resource Development, Government of India accepted the proposal and announced a matching grant to RGSOIPL. The school commenced its academic activities from 20 July 2006. The school was formally inaugurated, three days after, by Honorable Mr. Justice V.S Sirpurkar (retired Judge of the Supreme Court of India and the then Chief Justice of Calcutta High Court), at the Kalidas auditorium in IIT Kharagpur on 23 July 2006.

The school started functioning from Vinod Gupta School of Management at IIT Kharagpur in 2006. However, since 2008 the school has been functioning from its state-of-the-art modern building. The structural framework of the Law School, designed by the Department of Architecture, IIT Kharagpur replicates the Grecian style to reflect the impression of the Supreme Court of India. The building covers 38,000 square feet (3,500 m^{2}) area on a plot of land inside campus sprawling over 5 acres (20,000 m^{2}) (the IIT Kgp campus itself spread over an area more than 2100 acres, largest among all IITs).

== Academic collaboration and student exchange ==
RGSOIPL has a technical collaboration with the George Washington University Law School, (GWU) Washington DC which assists in formulating curriculum and knowledge exchange. Under the student exchange programme, RGSOIPL hosted a delegation of eight students from George Washington University Law School in March 2010. Further, 10 RGSOIPL students assisted by a faculty member visited GWU Law School in July 2011 for two weeks.

== Programmes and faculty ==
RGSOIPL presently offers a three-year full-time residential LL.B. (Hons.) The programme leading to the Degree of Bachelor of Laws with specialization in Intellectual Property Rights. The school is recognized by Bar Council of India. The graduates acquire skills in Business laws, Intellectual property laws and other regular courses prescribed by the Bar Council of India. The maximum student intake is 50. The school earlier offered a three-semester post-graduate diploma in Intellectual Property Law (PGDIPL) to two batches and the programme has been discontinued since 2008.

RGSOIPL also offers a doctorate programme leading to Ph.D. in law. The institute recently churned out its first Ph.D. in IP Law.

RGSOIPL has a full-time faculty of 10 professors, including two Fulbright scholars. The present faculty-student ratio is 1:10, one of the lowest among Indian law schools. The school has an impressive list of visiting faculty which include; Justice Umesh Chandra Banerjee (former Judge, Supreme Court of India), Justice Anandamoy Bhattacharjee (former Chief Justice of the Calcutta High Court and the Bombay High Court), Justice A.K Ganguly (Sitting Judge, Hon'ble Supreme Court of India), Justice Pratap Ray ( Judge of the Calcutta High Court), Justice Chittatosh Mookerjee (Former Chief Justice, Bombay and Calcutta High Courts), Prof. Mahendra Pal Singh, Prabuddha Ganguli (IP expert), Rodney D. Ryder (technology lawyer), Prof. Madhukar Sinha (IIFT Delhi), Dr. Vidya Sagar (Partner, Remfry & Sagar), Prof. V. Vijaya Kumar (NLSIU Bangalore), Prof. Graham Green Leaf, Prof. Michael Peters (University of New South Wales, Australia) etc.

Under the guidance of Prof. N.L Mitra (Advisor to RGSOIPL, former director, NLSIU Bangalore and founder vice chancellor, National Law School Jodhpur), RGSOIPL aims to reach the realm of success by linking both technology and law.

Recently, the school has introduced a unique inter-disciplinary program - Artificial Intelligence & Law, currently offered as an elective to the students of IIT Kharagpur.

== Research centres and collaborations ==
RGSOIPL is the founding partner of Legal Information Institute of India along with three other National Law Schools. LII of India, inaugurated in March 2011, is an international standard, free-access and non-profit comprehensive online collection of Indian legal information including statutes and case laws.

The Law school has an Indian Institute of Corporate Affairs (IICA) Hub funded by the Ministry of Corporate Affairs, Government of India. The hub will be involved in action research in areas including issues of corporate structure and ownership distribution, finance and security laws, risk management, insolvency and reconstruction of companies as well as contractual issues. The School is also an Eastern Zone center for DST-TIFAC Women Scientist Scheme for IPR Training of Women Scientists. Several workshops are conducted under its aegis and it is funded by Department of Science & Technology, Government of India.

== Achievements ==
Students of the school have won the ATRIP essay competition and Virginia Journal of Law and Technology (VJOLT) essay competition. The School won the 6th B.Krishna Memorial National IPR Moot Competition - 2014. The students also won the Runners Up and Best Memorial award in The Oxford University India Moot Court Competition on Constitutional Law 2013-14.

== Rankings ==
University rankings

Law – India
- NIRF (2022): 6

RGSOIPL was ranked sixth among Law schools in India by the National Institutional Ranking Framework (NIRF) in 2022.

== Campus placements and internships ==
Over the years, RGSOIPL students have earned accolades and respect in their respective organizations. Owing to the specialization of the course a majority of students have taken employment in the Intellectual Property domain and the school is now beginning to establish itself in other fields as well. Campus placements start from 1 December every year. The previous batches were recruited by global giants like General Electric, Eaton Corporation, Siemens India, Honeywell, Battelle India, Robert Bosch GmbH and Novo primarily for IP positions. Among Indian firms, Indian Oil Corporation, Hero Motocorp, Bajaj Auto, TVS Motors, Infosys, Wipro, Tata Consultancy Services, Cognizant, Johnson & Johnson, Venus Remedies and Avesthagen among many more have extended their offers to the graduates of the school for legal and IP profiles. Tier-I law firms like Amarchand & Mangaldas, Anand and Anand, Lall Lahiri & Salhotra, Lakshmi Kumaran & Sridharan, IUS Juris, Remfry and Sagar, Nishith Desai Associates have the Law school alumni working with them. Additionally Evalueserve, Pangea3, CPA Global, IP Horizons, Mindcrest and Lex Orbis have also recruited the Law school Alumni.

All the students have to compulsorily undergo summer internship for 8 weeks after 4th semester. In the past, several reputed organizations have offered summer internship roles to students of RGSOIPL. In addition to those stated above, these organizations include ABB, Texas Instruments India, 3M India, Philips India, Samsung India Software Operations, Monsanto India, Lupin, Biocon, Mahindra & Mahindra Limited, FICCI, Khaitan & Co. Mumbai, Zeus IP Advocates, Desai & Dewanji, ALMT Legal, Majmudar & Co. Mumbai among many others.

== Student activities ==
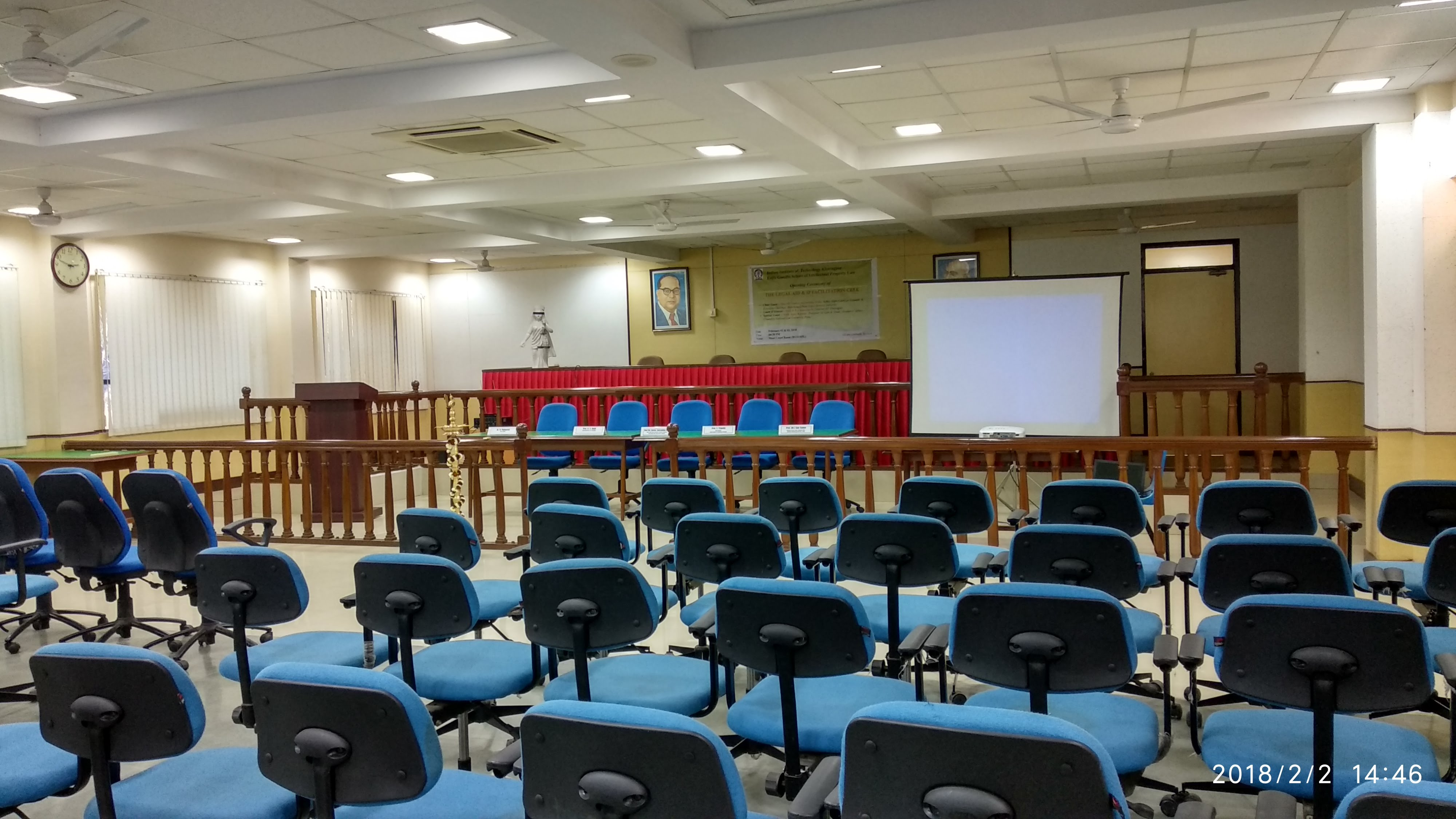
Moot Court Room - Rajiv Gandhi School of Intellectual Property Law, IIT Kharagpur

Despite a gruelling academic schedule, the students involve themselves in numerous activities. The School currently has a Cultural club, a Wall Journal committee, a Moot Court Society (MCS) and a Training & Placement Cell (TnP). All of these are managed by students with the help of faculty. The School also has a Legal Aid and Intellectual Property Facilitation Cell which offers free consultation over legal and IP matters to the general public, students and IIT community. Legal Aid Cell has organised many legal aid camps.

The Law school has the distinction of being the first among all IITs to hold a technology law moot court in 2007 which saw good participation from law schools across the country. Since 2010, RGSOIPL is organizing Shaastraarth, a 3 on 3 style Parliamentary debate competition during Saamanjasya, the social event organized every year by Vinod Gupta School of Management at IIT Kharagpur.
