= Konnithazham =

- village
- Konni thazham Achankovil river near village.
- Nickname: KONNI-PATHANAMTHITTA
- Country kerala, India: India
- State: Kerala
- District: Pathanamthitta

Government
  - Type: Village
  - Rank: Konni taluk

Population (2011)
  - Total: 13,009

Languages malayalam, English, hindi
  - Official: Malayalam, English
- Time zone: UTC+5:30 (IST)
- PIN: 689692
- Vehicle registration: KL- 83 konni

Konnithazham is a village in Pathanamthitta district in the state of Kerala, India. Located on the route from Konni to Kumbazha via Attachackal, Konnithazham is known for its secular harmony of people.

Rich with religious centres, Konni-Thazham houses churches belonging to Malankara Orthodox, Malankara Catholic, Roman Catholic, Malankara Marthomite and Pentecost. Sacred grooves are also seen in some areas. Iravon village office is also present here.

Iravon Village office, Konni Thazham LP school or Idayath School etc. are the main administrative-educational institutions in the area.

== Demographics ==
As of 2011 India census, Konnithazham had a population of 13009 with 6120 males and 6889 females.
