= Avesthagen =

Indian biological products company

Avesthagen Limited
- Type: Public
- Founded: Bangalore, India, 1998
- Founder: Villoo Morawala-Patell
- Headquarters: Bangalore, India
- Website: www.avesthagen.com

Avesthagen Limited is an integrated systems biology platform company headquartered in Bangalore, India. It was founded as an academic startup in 1998 by Villoo Morawala-Patell, a Rockefeller Fellow and grantee within NCBS-UAS, Bangalore. Avesthagen started business operations on March 21, 2001, with Series-A round investment led by ICICI Ventures and Tata Industries. Villoo Morawala Patell is the chairperson and managing director of Avesthagen Limited.

== Avestagenome Project ==
The Avestagenome Project, founded by Villoo Morawala Patell was created to identify genetic risk factors within the Parsi population that predispose individuals to cancers and high morbidity diseases. Its database of genomic variants derived from the Parsi control population is used with other populations to identify early intervention and improve disease prevention strategies to deliver improved health outcomes. The endogamous Parsi community is characterised by greater longevity, fewer cases of lung, head, neck and oesophageal cancers. At the same time, there is increased prevalence of Parkinson's & Alzheimer's diseases, cardiovascular disease, breast and prostate cancer, and male and female infertility. A pilot study by Avesthagen Limited into the prevalence of breast cancer biomarkers and metabolite signatures indicated unique signatures that are currently undergoing further validation in larger cohorts

Since 2008, the Avestagenome Project has collected blood samples and extensive patient data from over 4,500 members of the Zoroastrian-Parsi community with a target of 15,000 Parsis globally by 2021. The molecular basis of longevity and age-related disorders, prioritising cancers, cardiovascular disease, diabetes and neurological disorders will be investigated in this cohort specifically.

In 2019, this initiative received support by the Foundation for a Smoke-Free World of Philip Morris International. The Foundation for a Smoke-Free World has awarded Villoo Morawala-Patell a grant of 2.29M USD to explore “Cancer risk in smoking subjects assessed by next generation sequencing profile of circulating free DNA and RNA.” The work carried out at Avesthagen Limited will combine liquid biopsy, next-generation sequencing, bioinformatics, artificial intelligence and machine learning to identify predictive and early-stage biomarkers of cancers in smokers. The project will use non-Parsi smoker and non-smoker samples from the wider Indian and other populations to gain insights into the evidence behind such data.

== Recent publications ==
AGENOME-ZPMS-HV2a-1: The first complete Zoroastrian Parsi Mitochondrial Reference Genome

In a 2021 paper, Avesthagen researchers characterised the genetic traits specific to the Zoroastrian-Parsi population—a community that has historically abstained from smoking. Because of this unique social practice, Zoroastrian-Parsi genes may help scientists characterize biomarkers predictive of diseases caused by tobacco use, such as lung, head and neck, and esophagus cancers.

To obtain a complete picture of population-specific variants, the Avesthagen team analyzed one hundred Zoroastrian-Parsi mitochondrial genomes to generate a “consensus genome.” This is a process that combines genetic information from a large number of individuals to determine the genetic traits typical to that population. The mitochondrial DNA of one hundred Zoroastrian-Parsi individuals sequenced created the “consensus mitochondrial genome” (AGENOME-ZPMCG V 1.0).

Dynamic Methylome Modification associated with mutational signatures in ageing and etiology of disease

In 2020, Avesthagen released a pre-print of their work on the whole genome methylation and variant analysis in one Zoroastrian-Parsi non-smoking individual, collected at an interval of 12 years apart on biorXiv titled "Dynamic Methylome Modification associated with mutational signatures in ageing and aetiology of disease". The work identified 5258 disease relevant genes differentially methylated across this individual over 12 years and 24,948 genes corresponding to 4,58,148 variants specific to ZPMetG-Hv2a-1B, indicative of variants that accrued over time providing an understanding of the ageing methylome over time through the interplay between differentially methylated genes and variants in the aetiology of disease.

== Avgen Pharma ==
Avgen Pharma, Avesthagen's biopharmaceuticals business develops biosimilars and antibody therapeutics for oncology, auto-immune, cardiovascular–targeted biologics. Avgen Pharma owns 8 biosimilar molecules with patents, processes, manufacturing rights for global licensing and sales & marketing rights. The biosimilars listed below have completed preclinical trials and are ready to enter clinical trials for validation.

- Avdesp: Biosimilar version of Darbepoetinalfa for treatment of chronic kidney disease and chemotherapy-induced anaemia
- Avent: Biosimilar version of etanercept, which targets autoimmune disorders such as rheumatoid arthritis, ankylosing spondylitis and psoriasis. RCGM, after reviewing analytical characterization data on Avent, granted permission in January 2009 to conduct pre-clinical toxicity and efficacy studies. Avgen Biopharma has successfully completed both toxicity and efficacy studies for Avent. Pre-clinical Efficacy of Avent was carried out in a USFDA accredited human TNF transgenic murine model of Rheumatoid Arthritis and the biosimilar has demonstrated high structural and pre-clinical similarity with etanercept
- Avcade is Avesthagen biosimilar version of Infliximab targeting Crohn's Disease and rheumatoid arthritis. Avgen Biopharma has developed stable cell lines to produce Infliximab.
- Avplase is Avesthagen biosimilar version of Tenectaplase (also known as tPA) which targets acute myocardial infarction. Avgen Biopharma has developed stable cell lines for the production of Tenectplase.

== Avesta Nordic Research Private Limited ==
Avesthagen's DHA from algal sources will also provide the much need omega-3 fatty acids to vegetarians. The company is in the process of developing a manufacturing alliance for AvestaDHA and has developed a marketing alliances for its bioactives and DHA with a large beverage player in India, a large MNC retailer and a large Indian conglomerate.

The key products and product candidates are based upon, or include as a primary ingredient, scientifically and clinically validated plant extracts, or bioactives, sourced from traditional Indian medicine which we have researched and developed using ADePt, Avesta Nordic's proprietary bioactive discovery engine and information management platform and MetaGrid, the proprietary bioactive testing methodology. In May 2008, we launched Teestar, our first ADePt and MetaGrid derived bioactive, which we clinically demonstrated to reduce blood glucose levels.

== AVA Seeds ==
Avesthagen's subsidiary, AVA Seeds is engaged in the development of novel seed research, application of molecular markers and transgene based technologies to develop more productive food, feed, fuel and fiber based products.

The company as part of its sustainability initiative developed BioPercept, a biocompostable plastic made from renewable resources that breaks down and decomposes, under industrial composting conditions, within 120 days.

== Criticisms ==
In 2012, the company ran out of money and saw a number of exits by senior executives. Also in 2012, several former staff filed criminal and civil charges against the company.
