= Aryankavu Sastha Temple =

Aryankavu Sree Dharmasastha Temple
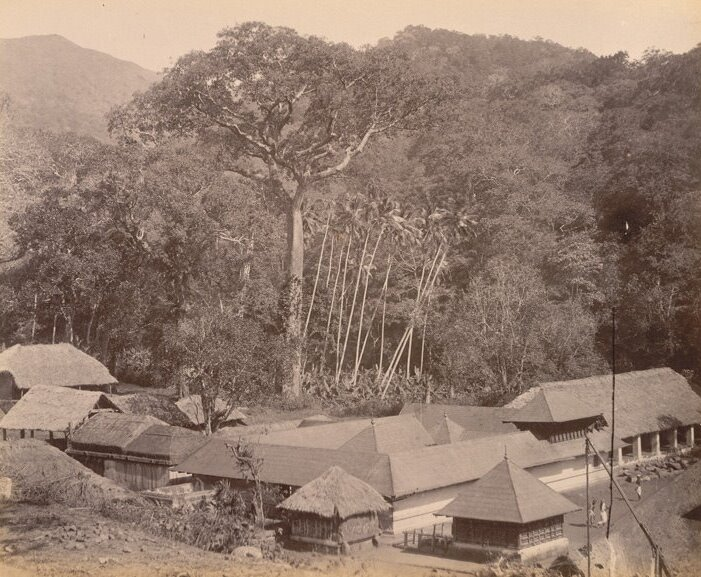
- The temple in the 1900s

- Location in Kerala Aryankavu Sastha Temple (India)

Religion
- Affiliation: Hinduism
- District: Kollam
- Deity: Shasta
- Festivals: Thiru Kalyanam in the Malayalam month of dhaṉu (December); Pandiyan Mudippu; Kumbhabhishekham
- Governing body: Travancore Devaswom Board

Location
- Location: Aryankavu
- State: Kerala
- Country: India
- Interactive map of Aryankavu Sree Dharmasastha Temple
- Coordinates: 8°58′35″N 77°09′05″E

Architecture
- Type: Dravidian architecture

Specifications
- Direction of façade: East
- Elevation: 237 m (778 ft)

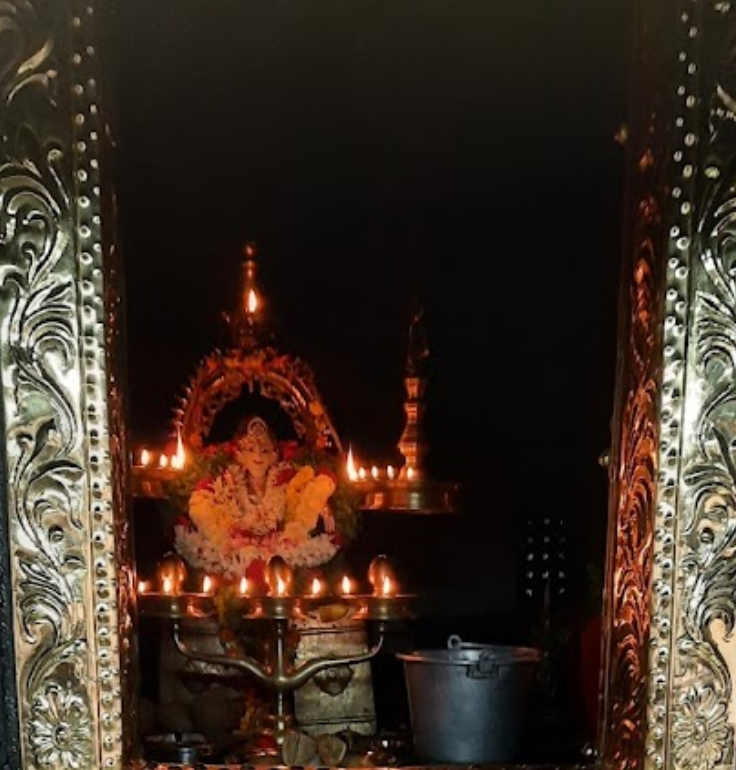
aryankavu sastha temple

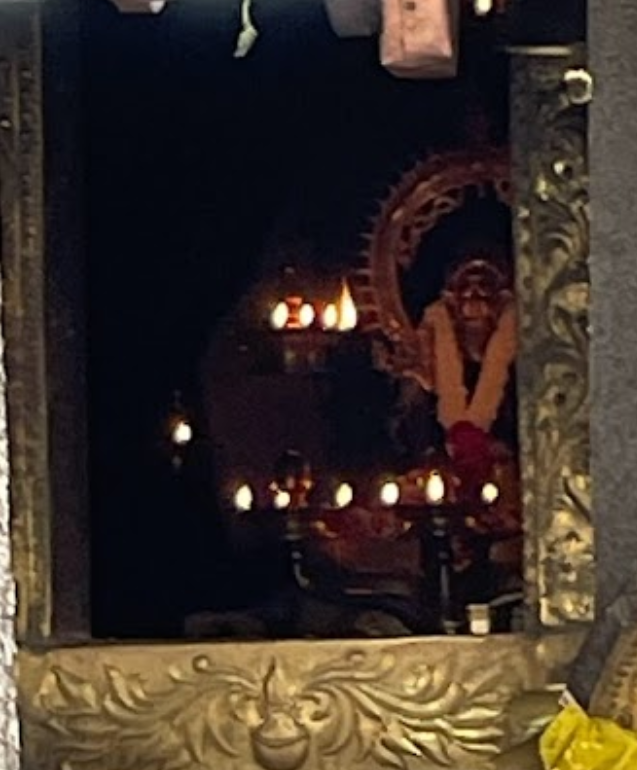
Aryankavu shastavu with pushkala

The Aryankavu Sastha Temple is a Hindu temple located in Aryankavu in the Kollam district of the Indian state of Kerala. It is one of the five major temples dedicated to Shasta in Kerala, the others being Kulathupuzha, Achankovil, Sabarimala and Kanthamala. The temple's idol is believed to have been consecrated by Parashurama. The temple is governed by the Travancore Devaswom Board.

== Etymology ==
The name "Aryankavu" is believed to be derived from the words "Aryan" which indicates Shasta and "Kavu" which means sacred grove.

== The temple ==
It is located in Aryankavu in the tehsil of Punalur in Kollam district. The temple lies near the border of Tamil Nadu on National Highway 744, about 73 km (45 mi) from Kollam, 33 km (21 mi) from Punalur and 21 km (13 mi) from Tenkasi. The temple is built in the traditional architectural styles of both Kerala and Tamil Nadu and preserves several murals of Hindu deities. As in Sabarimala, the temple also have 18 steps. Another feature of the temple is that it is built 11 metres (36 ft) below the road level. The puja and rituals conducted in the temple follow a Tamil tradition.

== Deities ==
The principal deity of the temple is Shasta, in the form of a teenager. The deity is locally known as Aryankavu Ayyan and Tiruaryan. He is depicted in a seated posture on an elephant, with the right leg hanging and the left leg in a folded position, along with his consort Pushkala on the left side and Shiva on the right. The original idol of the deity was made with a special type of stone known as Anjanapashanam. It was later replaced with an idol made of panchaloha. The subordinate deities of the temple are Valiyakadutha, Karuppu Sami and Karuppai Amma.

== Rituals and festivals ==
The temple is known for hosting a ritualistic marriage ceremony known as "Thiru Kalyanam" or "Thrikalyanam" (divine wedding) annually in December during the Sabarimala pilgrimage. According to the legends, Shasta married Shri Pushkaladevi of the Saurashtra community in Aryankavu. The marriage rituals are performed according to the traditions of the Saurashtra community in a dedicated Mandapa. Kerala rituals are followed inside the temple, while Tamil rituals are observed outside during the time of festival. On the occasion of Thiru Kalyanam, many unmarried girls visit the temple. Pandiyan Mudippu (engagement) and Kumbhabhishekham are other important festivals.

== See also ==
- List of Hindu temples in Kerala
