= Kulathupuzha Sastha Temple =

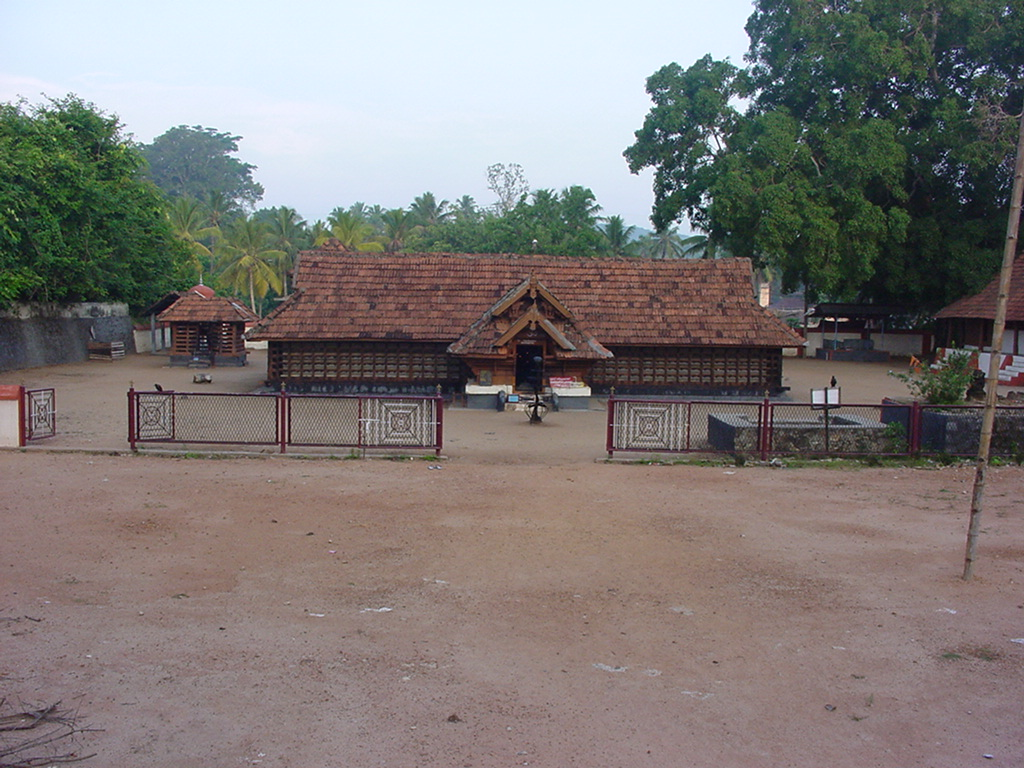
- The temple in 2005

- Location in Kerala Kulathupuzha Sastha Temple (India)

Religion
- Affiliation: Hinduism
- District: Kollam
- Deity: Shasta
- Festivals: Utsavam in the Malayalam month of mēṭam (April–May); Vishu (April)
- Governing body: Travancore Devaswom Board

Location
- Location: Kulathupuzha
- State: Kerala
- Country: India
- Coordinates: 8°54′03″N 77°03′32″E

Architecture
- Type: Traditional Kerala style

Specifications
- Direction of façade: East
- Elevation: 128 m (420 ft)

Kulathupuzha Sastha Temple is a Hindu temple dedicated to Shasta, located in Kulathupuzha in the Kollam district of Kerala, India. It is one of the five important Sastha temples in Kerala, the others being Aryankavu, Achankovil, Sabarimala and Kanthamala. The idol there is believed to have been installed by Parashurama and is made up of eight pieces of stone. The temple is known for the Meenoottu (fish feeding) offering. The temple is governed by the Travancore Devaswom Board.

== Location ==
The temple is located in Kulathupuzha in the tehsil of Punalur in Kollam district. It is situated about 64 km (40 mi) from Kollam on the banks of the Kulathupuzha River, a tributary of the Kallada River.

== Legend ==
According to the legend, the Kulathupuzha temple is one of the five Sastha temples founded by Parashurama. It is also believed that Sastha allowed a Jala Kanyaka (mermaid), who had a lust for him, to live in the temple pond in the form of a fish. A common belief is that the temple was founded by the Raja of Pandalam, but the idol of Sastha was founded by a Brahmin from Kottarakkara. Earlier, the temple was in the possession of the king of Kottarakkara. It was later handed over to the Travancore Devaswom Board. The tantric rights of the temple are held by the Kokkalathu Mutt.

== Deities ==
The principal deity of the temple is Shasta. He is in the form of Balasastha (child form) and is commonly known as Kulathupuzha Balakan. There is a popular song titled "Kulathupuzhayile Balakane" praising the deity of the temple. The deity here is in a fierce mood (ugramūrti) as well as in an auspicious mood (mangalapradāyakan). Shiva, Yakshi, Vishnu, Ganesha, Boothathan, Nāga, and Karuppu Sami are the subordinate deities.

== Offerings ==
The temple pond preserves a number of fish, as they are considered to be the favorites of Shasta. Devotees offer Meenoottu (fish feeding) for healing the warts in the skin. The fish are known as Thirumakkal (divine children). Most of them belong to the species Tor khudree and Hypselobarbus thomassi, which are at risk of extinction. Fishing is also strictly prohibited here.

== See also ==
- List of Hindu temples in Kerala
