= Mariamman Temple =

Mariamman Temple may refer to:

== India ==
- Mariamman Temple, Irukkankudi
- Mariamman temple, Ooty
- Mariamman Temple, Samayapuram
- Arulmigu Maha Muthu Mariamman Thevasthanam
- Mariamman Koil, Pilakool
- Punnainallur Mariamman Temple
- Sri Mariamman Temple, Medan
- Sri Mariamman Temple, Valangaiman

== Other countries ==
- Sri Mariamman Temple, Singapore
- Sri Mariamman Temple, Medan, Indonesia
- Mariamman Temple, Pretoria, South Africa
- Mariamman Temple, Ho Chi Minh City, Vietnam

== See also ==
- Sri Mahamariamman Temple (disambiguation)
