= Tamil mythology =

Dravidian pantheon and folklore

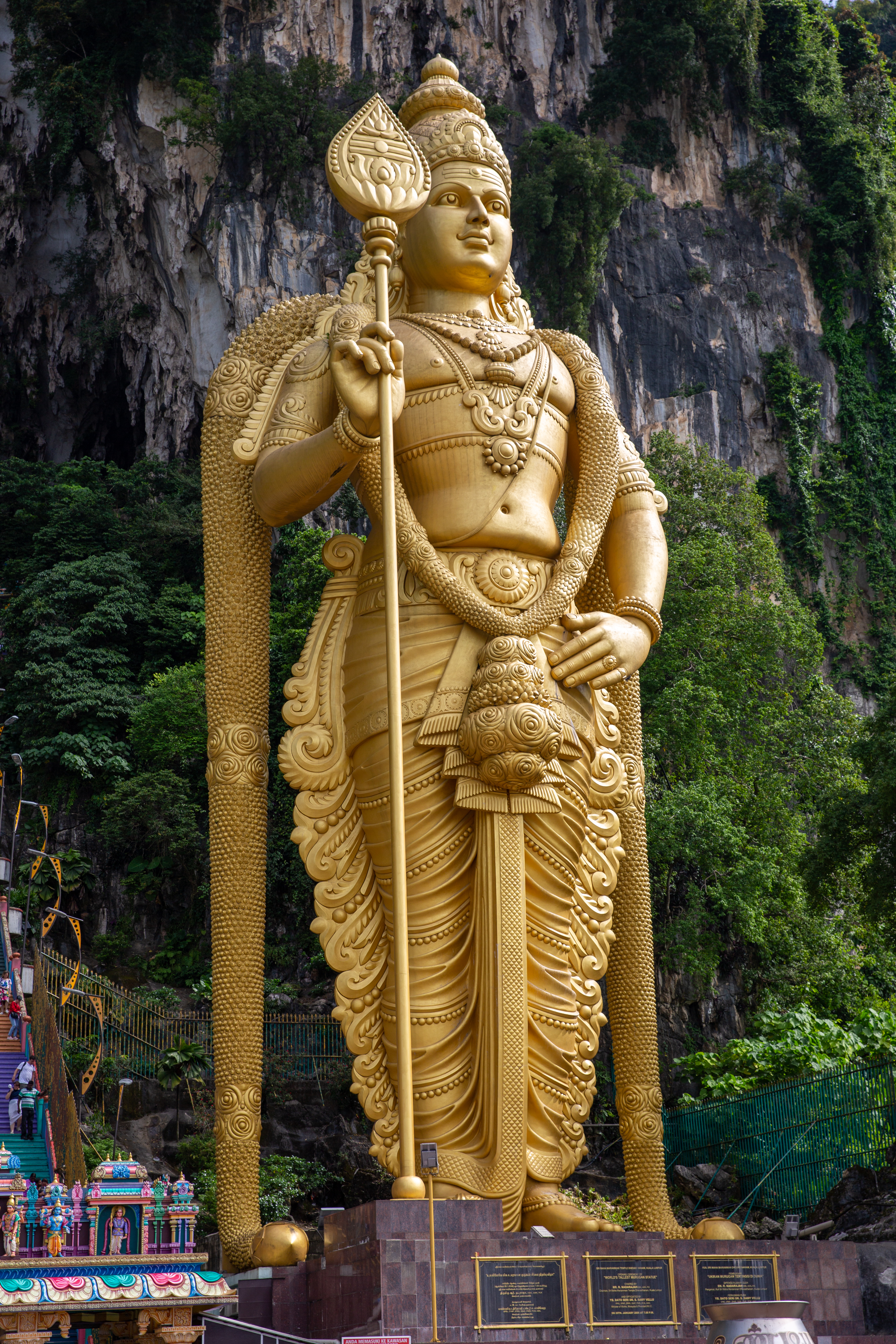
Statue of Murugan at Batu Caves, Malaysia. Murugan is known as Seyyon in ancient Tamil grammatical works Tholkappiyam.

Tamil mythology refers to the folklore and traditions that are a part of the wider Dravidian pantheon, originating from the Tamil people. This body of mythology is a fusion of elements from Dravidian culture and the parent Indus Valley culture, both of which have been syncretised with mainstream Hinduism.

Tamil literature, in tandem with Sanskrit literature and the Sthala puranas of temples, form a major source of information regarding Tamil mythology. The ancient epics of Tamilakam detail the origin of various figures in Hindu scriptures, like Agathiyar, Iravan, and Patanjali. Ancient Tamil literature contains mentions of nature-based indigenous deities like Tirumal, Murugan, and Kotravai. The Tolkappiyam hails Tirumal as Brahman, Murugan as Seyyon (the red one), and Kotravai as the goddess worshipped in the dry lands. By the eighth century BCE, Tamilakam became the springboard of the Bhakti movement, invoking devotional poetry composed by the poet-saints called the Alvars and the Nayanars, propagating popular worship of Vishnu and Shiva throughout the subcontinent.

== Deities ==
=== Murugan ===
Murugan, also known as Kandhan, Kumaran, Kartikeyan, and Subramaniyan, is a Hindu deity associated with war and victory. He is described as the son of Parvati and Shiva, brother of Ganesha, and a deity whose life has many versions in Hinduism. He is an important deity around South Asia since ancient times and is particularly popular and predominantly worshiped in South India, Sri Lanka, Singapore and Malaysia as Murugan.

Murugan is an ancient god, mentioned in ancient Tamil grammatical works Tholkappiyam, the ten anthologies Pattuppāṭṭu, the eight anthologies Eṭṭuttokai sheds light on early ancient Dravidian religion. Seyyon (Also known as Murugan) was glorified as "the red god seated on the blue peacock, who is ever young and resplendent", as "the favored god of the Tamils".

Originally a god of the Kurinji hillfolk of Tamilakam, this Dravidian deity of Murugan was syncretised with the Vedic god known as Subrahmanya. Archaeological evidence from 1st-century CE and earlier, where he is found with Hindu god Agni (fire), suggest that he was a significant deity in early Hinduism. He is found in many medieval temples all over India, such as at the Ellora Caves and Elephanta Caves.

The iconography of Murugan varies significantly; he is typically represented as an ever-youthful man, riding or near a peacock, dressed with weapons sometimes near a rooster. Most icons show him with one head, but some show him with six heads reflecting the legend surrounding his birth. He grows up quickly into a philosopher-warrior, destroys evil in the form of asuras Taraka, teaches the pursuit of ethical life and the theology of Shaiva Siddhanta. After defeating the asura Surapadman, Murugan marries the two daughters of Vishnu, Devasena and Sundaravalli. He has inspired many poet-saints, such as Arunagirinathar.

=== Ayyappan ===
Ayyappan (Tamil: ஐயப்பன்) (also called Sastavu, or Sasta) is a Hindu deity predominantly worshipped in Kerala, an erstwhile region of Tamilakam. Ayyappan is believed to be an incarnation of Dharma Sasta, who is the offspring of Shiva and Vishnu (as Mohini, the only female avatar of Vishnu) and is generally depicted in a yogic posture, wearing a jewel around his neck, hence earning him the moniker Manikandan. Ayyappan may bear a historical relationship to the tutelary deity Ayyanar in Tamil Nadu.

=== Perumal ===
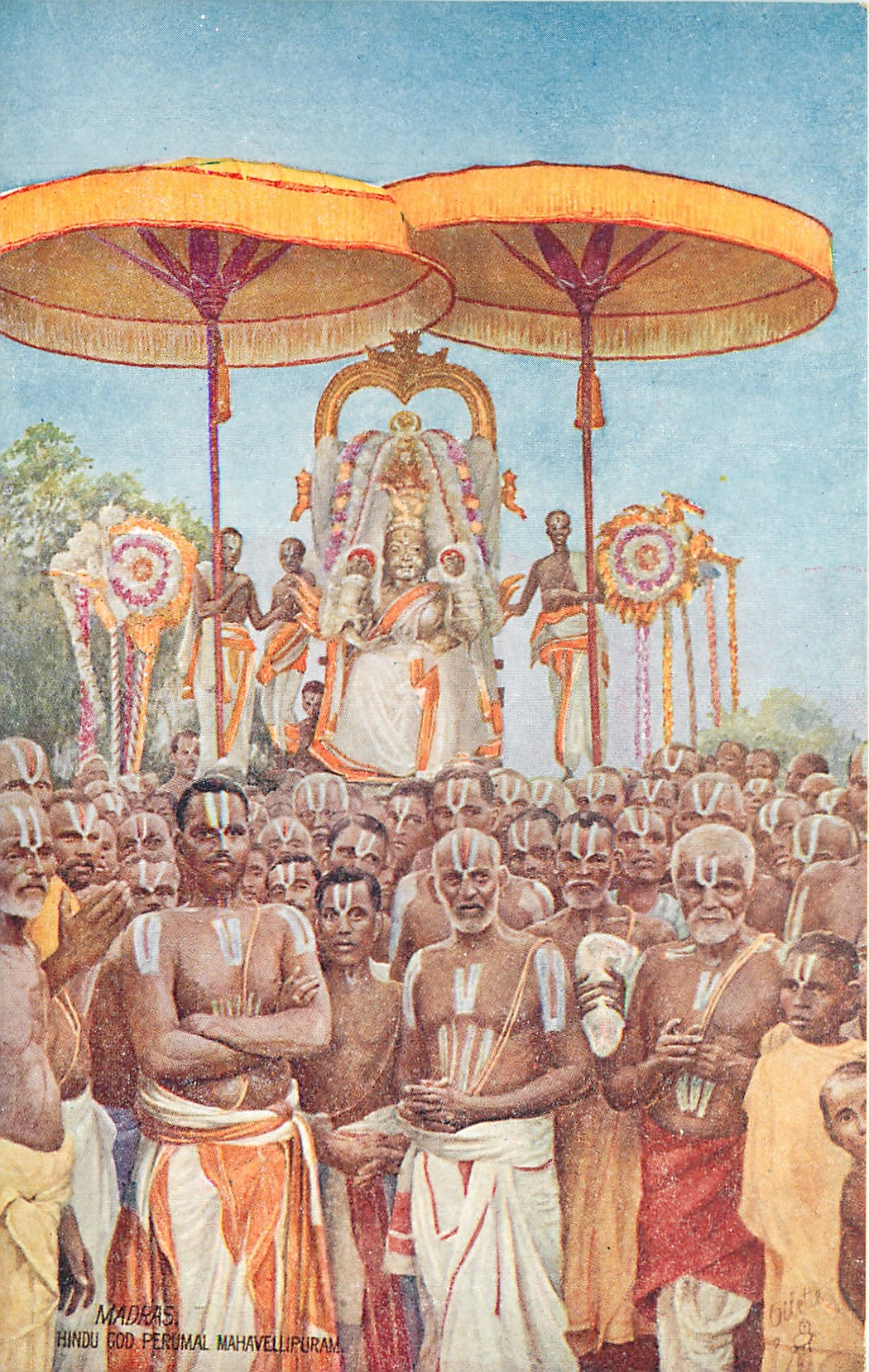
Procession of the Tamil deity Perumal, identified with Vishnu

Perumal (Tamil: பெருமாள்), also Tirumal (Tamil: திருமால்), is the Hindu deity venerated in the Sri Vaishnavism sect of Hinduism. Perumal is considered to be another name of Vishnu, and was traditionally the deity associated with the forests.

==== Mentions in Sangam literature ====
Tamil Sangam literature (200 BCE to 500 CE) mentions Mayon or the "dark one," as the supreme deity who creates, sustains, and destroys the universe and was worshipped in the mountains of Tamilakam. The verses of Paripadal describe the glory of Perumal in the most poetic of terms.

தீயினுள் தெறல் நீ;
பூவினுள் நாற்றம் நீ;
கல்லினுள் மணியும் நீ;
சொல்லினுள் வாய்மை நீ;
அறத்தினுள் அன்பு நீ;
மறத்தினுள் மைந்து நீ;
வேதத்து மறை நீ;
பூதத்து முதலும் நீ;
வெஞ் சுடர் ஒளியும் நீ;
திங்களுள் அளியும் நீ;
அனைத்தும் நீ;
அனைத்தின் உட்பொருளும் நீ;

— Paripadal, iii: 63–68
Translation:

In fire, you are the heat;
in blossoms, the fragrance;
among the stones, you are the diamond;
in speech, truth;
among virtues, you are love;
in valour—strength;
in the Veda, you are the secret;
among elements, the primordial;
in the burning sun, the light;
in moonshine, its sweetness;
you are all,
and you are the substance and meaning of all.

— F Gros, K Zvelebil

==== Veneration in Tamil Nadu ====
Perumal (Vishnu) was the only deity who enjoyed the status of Paramporul during the Sangam age. The reference to Mukkol Bhagavars in Sangam literature indicates that only Vaishnavaite saints holding Tridanda existed during the age and Perumal was glorified as the supreme deity, whose "divine lotus feet can burn all our evils and grant moksha" (maru piraparukkum maasil sevadi). During the post-Sangam period, his worship was further glorified by the alvars and Vaishnava acharyas. The veneration of Perumal is primarily performed in Tamil Nadu in sacred ceremonies and temples by the Iyengar community.

=== Nataraja ===
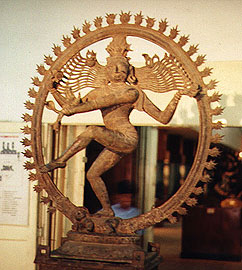
Shiva the Nataraja performing the tandavam

The story of Chidambaram begins with Shiva strolling into the Thillai Vanam (vanam meaning forest and thillai trees – botanical name Exocoeria agallocha, a species of mangrove trees – which currently grows in the Pichavaram wetlands near Chidambaram). In the Thillai forests resided a group of sages or 'rishis' who believed in the supremacy of magic and that God can be controlled by rituals and mantras or magical words. Shiva strolled in the forest with resplendent beauty and brilliance, assuming the form of Bhikshatana, a simple mendicant seeking alms. He was followed by Vishnu, as Mohini. The sages and their wives were enchanted by the brilliance and the beauty of the handsome mendicant and his companion. On seeing their womenfolk enchanted, the rishis got enraged and invoked scores of serpents (nāgas) by performing magical rituals. Shiva lifted the serpents and donned them as ornaments on his matted locks, neck and waist. Further enraged, the sages invoked a fierce tiger, whose skins and dons were used by Shiva as a shawl around his waist and then followed by a fierce elephant, which was devoured and ripped to death by Shiva (Gajasamharamurthy).

The rishis gathered all their spiritual strength and invoked a powerful demon Muyalakan – a symbol of complete arrogance and ignorance. Shiva wore a gentle smile, stepped on the demon's back, immobilized him and performed the Ánanda Tandava (the dance of eternal bliss) and disclosed his true form. The sages surrender, realizing that Shiva was beyond magic and rituals.

=== Meenakshi ===
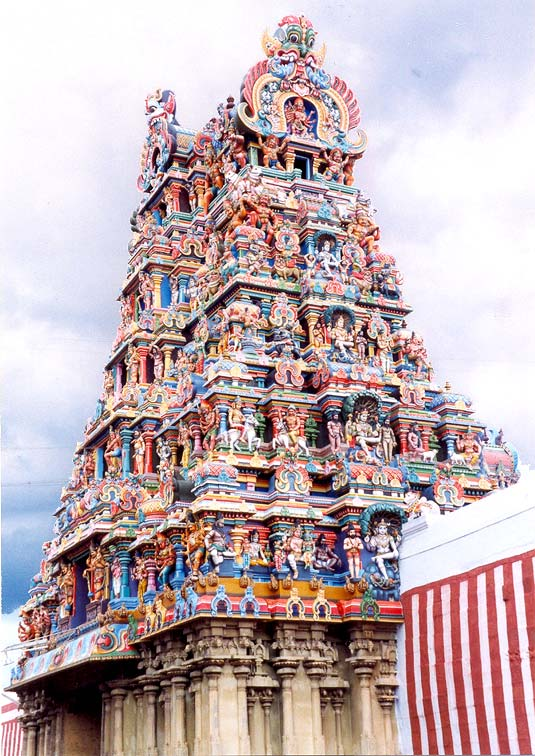
One of the Gopuram of Meenakshi Amman Temple at Madurai

Once Indra killed an asura, even though the asura did not harm anyone. This act brought a curse upon Indra that forced him to continue wandering until he was walking around looking for a way where no one would tell him which way to go will redeem him from his sin. After much wandering, Indra was freed from his suffering through the power of a Shivalingam in a forest, and so he built a small temple at that site.

It so happened that at that time in South India there was a Pandyan king called Malayadhwaja Pandiyan ruling a small city by the name Manavur, which was quite near to this Shivalinga. He was the son of Kulashekara Pandyan. He learned about the Shivalinga and decided to build a huge temple for Shiva in the forest Kadambavanam (vanam means forest). He also developed the region into a fine princely state called Madurai.

The king was childless and sought an heir for the kingdom. Shiva granted him his prayers through an Ayonija child (one born not from the womb). This child was three years old and actually the incarnation of goddess Parvati the consort of Shiva. She was born with fish-shaped eyes. It was said that the extra breast would disappear when she met her future husband. She was named Mīnakshi, (meaning fish eyed) from the words mīn (meaning fish) and akṣi (meaning eyes). Mīnakshi also means "the one who has eyes like that of a fish". Fishes are said to feed their younger ones with their eyes, similarly goddess looks after her devotees. Just by her sight our miseries disappear.

She grew up to be a Shiva-Shakti personification. After the death of the king, she ruled the kingdom with skillful administration.

In one of her expeditions she went to the Himalayas and there, on seeing Shiva, her extra breast disappeared. Many of the gods and goddesses came to witness their marriage.

At the wedding celebrations the gods refused to have the served food unless Shiva performed a majestic dance for everybody gathered at the place. At this there was the dance of Chidambaram, the cosmic dance in front of his wife Minakshi. It epitomised and merged all life force and beauty into one whole. In the end Minakshi was merged with the shivalingam and became the representation of life and beauty.

=== Kannagi ===
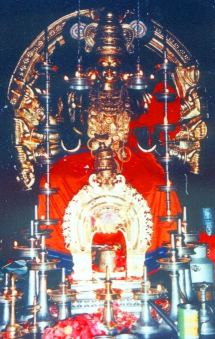
Deity of Kodungallur Bhagavathy in the temple

Kannagi (Kannaki), a legendary Tamil woman, is the central character of the South Indian epic Cilappatikaram (100–300 CE). The story relates how Kannagi took revenge on the early Pandyan King of Madurai, for a mistaken death penalty imposed on her husband Kovalan, by cursing the city with disaster.

Kodungallur Bhagavathy Temple was built to commemorate the martyrdom of Kannagi. It is said that sixth avatar of Vishnu, Sage Parasurama built this temple for the prosperity of the people. According to the old chronicles, this Bhagavathi temple was created in the heart of the town many centuries ago to serve a special purpose.

Legend says that, after the creation of Kerala by Parasurama, he was harassed by a demon called Daruka. To kill this evil demon, Parashurama prayed to Shiva for help. As advised by Shiva, Parasurama constructed the shrine and installed the Shakti Devi as Bhagavathi. The deity in the temple, it is believed, is Parashakthi herself. According to legends, it was Bhadrakali who killed the demon Daruka. She is worshipped as goddess Pattini in Sri Lanka by the Sinhalese Buddhists, Kannaki Amman by the Sri Lankan Tamil Hindus (See Hinduism in Sri Lanka) and as Kodungallur Bhagavathy and Attukal Bhagavathy in the South Indian state of Kerala.

Kannagi is also viewed as a brave woman who could demand justice directly from the King and even dared to call him "unenlightened king" in the Cilappatikaram.

=== Mariamman ===
Mariamman is a Hindu goddess of rain, predominant in the rural areas of South India. Mariamman's worship originated in the traditions of Dravidian folk religion, the faith practised by the inhabitants of the south before its syncretism with Vedic Hinduism. She is the main Tamil mother goddess, predominant in the rural areas of South India. Mariamman is usually pictured as a beautiful young woman with a red-hued face, wearing a red dress. Sometimes, she is portrayed with many arms—representing her many powers—but in most representations she has only two or four.

Mariamman is generally portrayed in the sitting or standing position, often holding a trident (trishula) in one hand and a bowl (kapala) in the other. One of her hands may display a mudra, usually the abhaya mudra, to ward off fear. She may be represented with two demeanours—one displaying her pleasant nature, and the other her terrifying aspect, with fangs and a wild mane of hair.

=== Other deities ===
Other deities that fall under the scope of the Tamil pantheon include:

- Angala
- Ayyanar
- Madurai Veeran
- Karuppu Sami
- Muniandi
- Sudalai Madan
- Isakki
- Devi Kanya Kumari
- Periyachi
- Kadalon
- Vendhan
- Kottravai
- Virabahu
- Masani Amman
- Kateri Amman
- Pavadairayan
- Iravan
- Chenjiamman
- Devasena
- Valli
- Niladevi
- Pidari
- Kathiravan
- Vetiyappan

==== Spirit Possession and the Fluid Identity in Tamil Rituals ====
In rural Tamil Nadu, certain rituals—such as exorcism and sacrificial ceremonies—are structured around the incorporation of deities or demons into human participants through trance-induced possession. The primary aim is embodied in the enactment of dance by divine entities entering into human vessels. During such rituals, practitioners pose the question, “Who are you?” to the possessing forces, seeking revelation of their identities, intent, emotions, and knowledge. Once these entities manifest, often through the voices of their human mediums, they are recognized not as disembodied forces but as “persons”—entities with whom one can converse, negotiate, or command to remain or depart.

This state of trance constructs a dynamic interplay between the cosmos and human psychology: the possessing being (cosmological force) is “enlarged”, gaining complexity and presence, whereas the human host undergoes a kind of simplification or reduction. The pinnacle of this process is the appropriation of fixed or archetypal identities and names, marking the ritual's purpose and completion.

=== Variations ===
Tamil mythology, while heavily influenced by mainstream Hindu mythology, offers a number of variations in the existence of regional deities, divergences in legends, and relationships in the overall pantheon.

- Parvati is regarded to be the sister of Vishnu. Vishnu is sometimes referred to as the ceremonial sister of the goddess in Shaivism.
- Vishnu is featured with three consorts: Sridevi, Bhudevi, and Niladevi, all of them manifestations of Lakshmi. While Bhudevi is sometimes regarded to be a consort of Vishnu, Niladevi is widely excluded in mainstream Hinduism.
- Murugan is regarded to be the younger brother of Ganesha. The deity is the elder brother of Ganesha in the Puranas.
- Murugan is regarded to have two consorts, Valli and Devayanai, the daughters of Vishnu. He is celibate in the Puranas.
- Murugan is hailed for his victory over Surapadman in the Kanda Puranam. In the Skanda Purana, his antagonist is Tarakasura.
- Balarama is featured in the Dashavatara. In various Puranas, Balarama is often substituted with the Buddha.

== Alvars ==
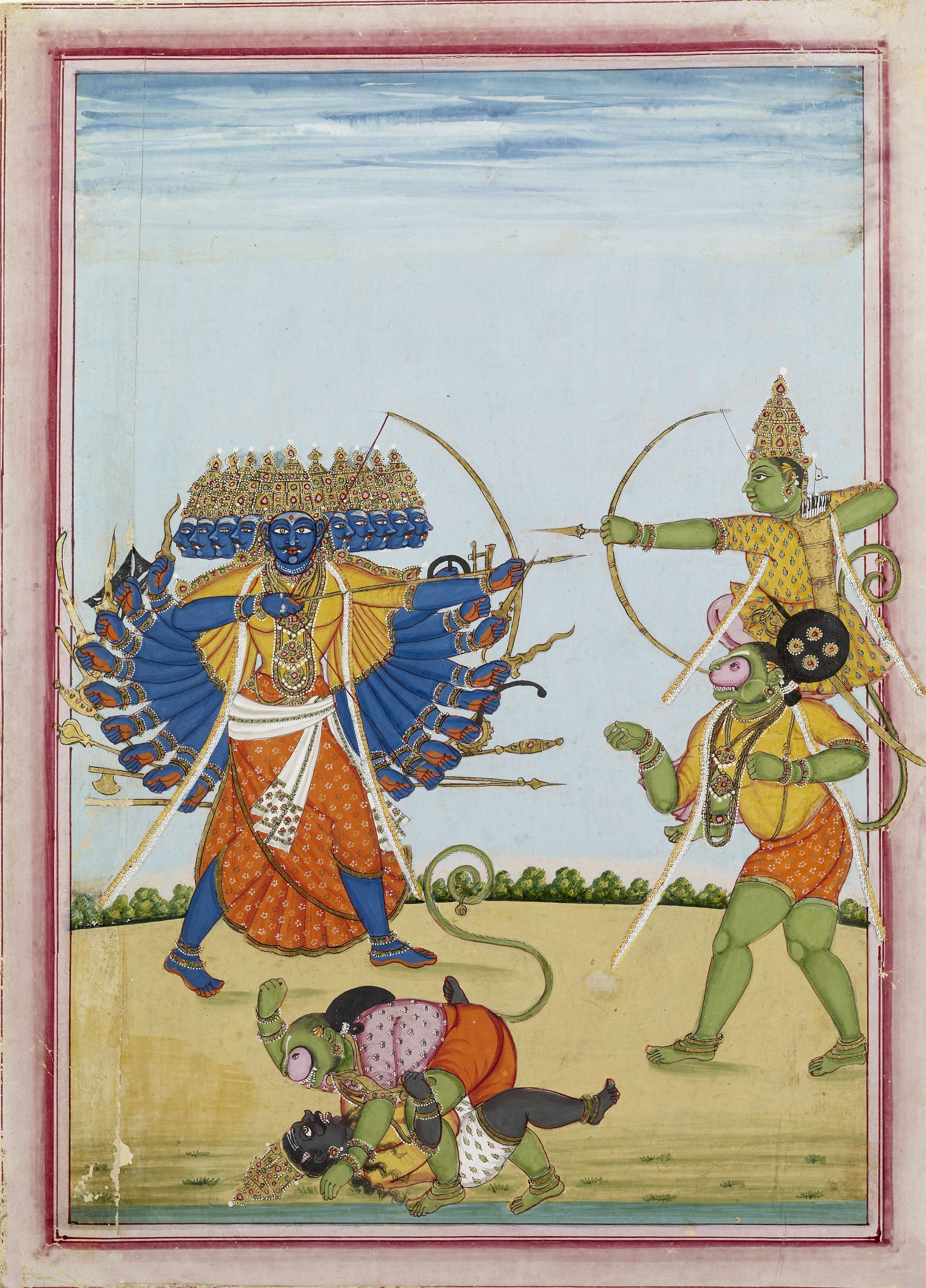
Rama and Hanuman fighting Ravana, an album painting on paper from Tamil Nadu, ca 1820.

The Alvars (Tamil: ஆழ்வார், romanized: Āḻvār, lit. 'The Immersed') were Tamil poet-saints of South India who espoused bhakti (devotion) to the Hindu god Vishnu in their songs of longing, ecstasy, and service. They are venerated in Vaishnavism, which regards Vishnu as the Ultimate Reality.

The devotional outpourings of the Alvars, composed during the early medieval period of Tamil history, were the catalysts behind the Bhakti movement through their hymns of worship to Vishnu and his avatars. They praised the Divya Desams, the 108 divine realms of deities affiliated to Vaishnavism. The poetry of the Alvars echoes bhakti to God through love, and in the ecstasy of such devotions they sang hundreds of songs which embodied both depth of feeling and the felicity of expressions. The collection of their hymns is known as the Naalayira Divya Prabandham. The bhakti literature that sprang from Alvars has contributed to the establishment and sustenance of a culture that deviated from the Vedic religion and rooted itself in devotion as the only path for salvation. In addition, they contributed to Tamil devotional verses independent of a knowledge of Sanskrit. As a part of the legacy of the alvars, five Vaishnava philosophical traditions (sampradayas) developed over a period of time.

== Siddhars ==
Siddhars (Tamil: சித்தர்) are saints in India, mostly affiliated with the Shaiva denomination in Tamil Nadu, who professed and practised an unorthodox type of Sadhana, or spiritual practice, to attain liberation. Yogic powers referred to as Siddhis are believed to be acquired by constant practice of certain yogic disciplines. Those who acquire these Siddhis are called Siddhas. These Siddhars can be compared to mystics of the western civilization. Siddhars are people who are believed to control and transcend the barriers of time and space by meditation (yoga), after the use of substances called rasayanas that transform the body to make it potentially deathless, and a particular breathing-practice, a type of Pranayama. Through their practices, they are believed to have reached stages of insight which enabled them to tune into the powers hidden in various material substances and practices, useful for the suffering and ignorant mankind. Typically, Siddhars were saints, doctors, alchemists, and mystics all at once. They wrote their findings in the form of poems in Tamil language, on palm leaves that are collected and stored in what are known today as the palm leaf manuscript, today still owned by private families in Tamil Nadu and handed down through the generations, as well as public institutions such in universities all over the world (India, Germany, Great Britain, U.S.).

In this way, Siddhars developed, among other branches of a vast knowledge-system, what is now known as Siddha medicine, practised mainly in Tamil Nadu as traditional native medicine. A rustic form of healing that is similar to Siddha medicine has since been practised by experienced elderly in the villages of Tamil Nadu. (This has been misunderstood as Paatti Vaitthiyam, Naattu marunthu and Mooligai marutthuvam. While paati vaitthiyam or naatu marunthu is traditional Tamil medicine and mooligai marutthuvam is ayurvedic medicine.) They are also founders of Varmam – a martial art for self-defence and medical treatment at the same time. Varmam are specific points located in the human body which when pressed in different ways can give various results, such as disabling an attacker in self-defence, or balancing a physical condition as an easy first-aid medical treatment.

Tamil Siddhars were the first to develop pulse-reading ("naadi paarththal" in Tamil) to identify the origin of diseases. This method was later copied and used in ayurvedha.

Siddhars have also written many religious poems. It is believed that most of them have lived for ages, in a mystic mountain called Sathuragiri, near Thanipparai village in Tamil Nadu.

One of the best-known Siddhars was Agastya, who is believed to be the founding father of Siddha culture.

Abithana Chintamani states Siddhars are either of the 9 or 18 persons enlisted, but sage Agastya states that there are many who precede these and follow 9 or 18 persons. Many of the great Siddhars are regarded to have powers magical and spiritual.

There are 18 Siddhars in the Tamil Siddha tradition:

1. Nandeeswarar
2. Tirumular
3. Agastya
4. Kamalamuni
5. Patanjali
6. Korakkar
7. Sundaranandar
8. Konganar
9. Sattamuni
10. Vanmeegar
11. Ramadevar
12. Dhanvanthri
13. Idaikkadar
14. Machamuni
15. Karuvoorar
16. Bogar
17. Pambatti Siddhar
18. Kuthambai

== See also ==
- The Five Great Epics of Tamil Literature
- Sangam literature
- Tamilagam

== Sources ==
- Clothey, Fred W. (1978). The Many Faces of Murukan̲: The History and Meaning of a South Indian God. Walter de Gruyter. ISBN 978-90-279-7632-1.
- Gopinatha Rao, T. A. (1993). Elements of Hindu iconography. Motilal Banarsidass. ISBN 978-81-208-0878-2.
- Jones, Constance; Ryan, James D. (2006). Encyclopedia of Hinduism. Infobase Publishing. ISBN 978-0-8160-7564-5.
- Lal, Mohan (1992). Encyclopaedia of Indian Literature. Sahitya Akademi. ISBN 978-81-260-1221-3.
- Lochtefeld, James G. (2002). The Illustrated Encyclopedia of Hinduism: N-Z. The Rosen Publishing Group. ISBN 978-0-8239-3180-4.
- Parpola, Asko (2015). The Roots of Hinduism: The Early Aryans and the Indus Civilization. Oxford University Press. ISBN 978-0-19-022691-6.
