= Samayapuram Pojeeswarar Temple =

Coordinates: 10.92283°N 78.73920°E

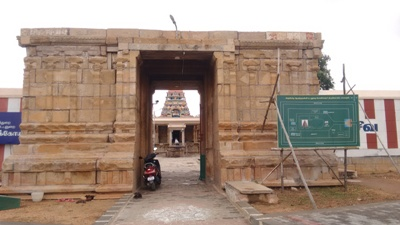
Entrance

Samayapuram Pojeeswarar Temple is a Hindu Temple located at Samayapuram near Trichy, Tamilnadu, India.

== Location ==
This temple is situated near Samayapuram Mariamman Temple. This temple is under the administration of Samayapuram Mariamman Temple administration.

== Presiding deity ==
The presiding deity of the temple is Shiva, known as Pojeeswarar and the Goddess is Anandavalli.

== Structure ==
The entrance has no rajagopura. Next to the entrance Mrityunjay is found on a hill, followed by balipeetam and nandhi. The presiding deity is facing east and in the left the goddess is facing south. Bhairava, Surya, Vinayaka, Dakshinamurti, and Lingodbhava are found. In the south-west the shrine of Vinayaka and in the west shrine of Muruga with his consorts are found. It has two vimanas. Agni Tirttam is the temple tank. The temple tree is vilva.

== Gallery ==
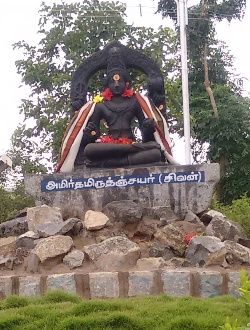

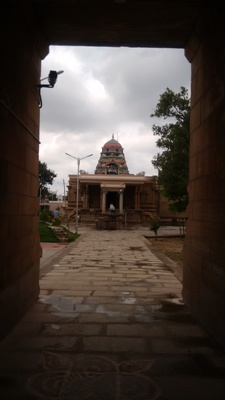

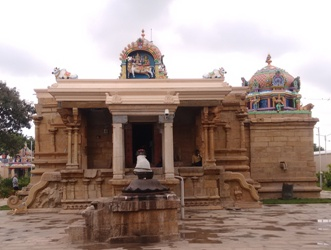

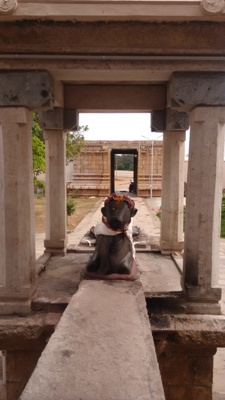

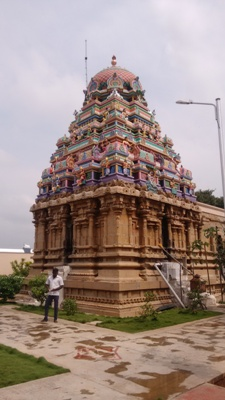

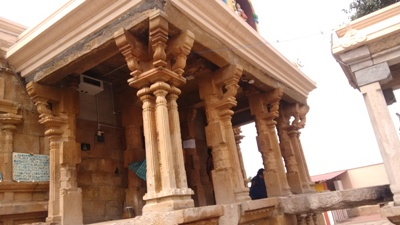

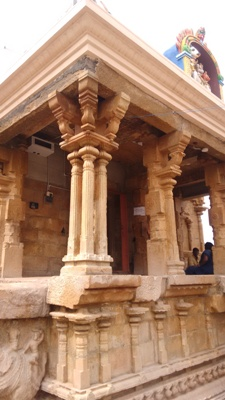
