= Masani Amman =

Hindu village deity of Tamil Nadu

Arulmigu Sri Masani Amman Temple
- அருள்மிகு ஸ்ரீ மாசாணியம்மன் திருக்கோயில்
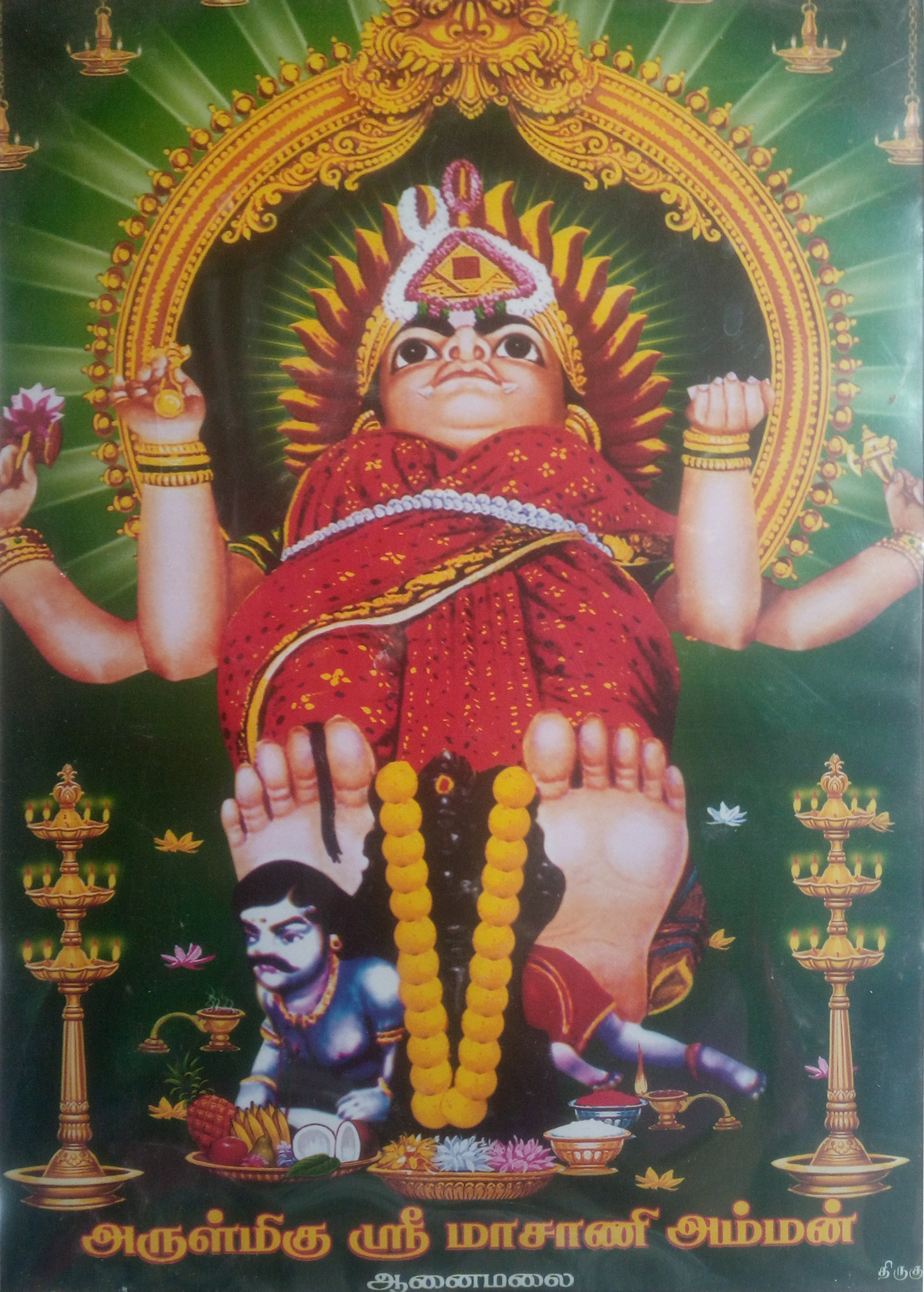
- Poster depicting the main murti of Masani Amman

- Location in Tamil Nadu, India

Religion
- Affiliation: Hinduism
- District: Coimbatore
- Deity: Masani Amman (Shakti)
- Festivals: Navaratri, Vijaya Dashami

Location
- Location: Anaimalai
- State: Tamil Nadu
- Country: India
- Coordinates: 10.5755701°N 76.9348486°E

Architecture
- Type: Dravidian architecture
- Completed: before 1000 CE

Website
- Official Website

Masani Amman is a Hindu deity. She is primarily worshipped as a family deity (kuladevi) by certain classes in Tamil Nadu, where She is regarded as an avatar (incarnation) of Adi Parashakti. Her chief temple is located in Anaimalai, Pollachi area, Coimbatore district of Tamil Nadu state, India.

Arulmigu Sri Masani Amman Temple is a highly revered shrine situated in Anaimalai, which is located about 24 km (15 mi) southwest of Pollachi. At the confluence of the Aliyar River and the Uppar stream, the temple is built on grassland near the Anaimalai Hills and enshrines the sleeping Goddess Masani Amman as the presiding deity. She is seen in a unique lying posture, measuring 15 ft (4.6 m) from head to foot. In Her four hands She holds a damaru with a snake entwined around it, a fire bowl, a bowl containing kumkuma, and a trident. Other deities worshipped in the complex include the sacred Neethi Kall (Stone of Justice) and Mahamuniappan. It is a popular belief that Masani Amman cures any illness if one walks around Her trident, which is located in front of the main sanctum. She also provides relief to those suffering from menstrual cramps.

Inside the sanctum, showing the main mūrti

Main offering, ground red chillies on the sacred Justice Stone

Ground red chilli offerings in the temple

== Legend ==
According to local tradition, during ancient times, Anaimalai was known as Nannur and the region was ruled by Nannan, a wicked king from the Ezhilmalai dynasty who persecuted his subjects. He protected the fruits of his mango grove by instituting severe punishments for any who ate of them. One day, a woman unfamiliar with these measures ate one of Nannan's mangoes, so he sentenced her to death. Despite public outcry against it, the woman was executed, and later the local people rebelled and Nannan was killed by the Chera king Kalankaikanni Narmudi Cheral in a battle near Vijayamangalam. This is mentioned in the Kurunthokai, where Nannan is given the title "Pen-kolai-purintha Nannan" (meaning "Nannan, who committed the muder of a woman" in Tamil) for killing the woman in modern-day Anaimalai.

People believed that the woman had saved their lives by sacrificing herself and the people built a shrine to the executed woman and deified her. The stone where she was executed was later worshipped with ground red chillies as an offering. Its deity was originally called either "Masani" (meaning "mango" in old Tamil) or "Smashani" (Sanskrit for "graveyard", about the woman's untimely end), depending on the version of the legend. Later, the deity came to be known as Masani Amman. Masani Amman was later syncretised with the goddess Adi Parashakti. She was later associated with the goddesses Mariamman, Angala Devi, Isakki and Karumari.

== See also ==
- Devi Kanya Kumari
- Angala Devi
- Isakki
