= Muthumariamman Temple, Narthamalai =

Hindu temple in Tamil Nadu, India

Muthumariamman Temple is situated at Narthamalai in Pudukkottai district in Tamil Nadu, India.

== Presiding deity ==
The Muthumariamman is the presiding deity. As the name of the place is Narthamalai, the Goddess is known as Narthamalai Muthumariamman.

== Structure ==
The temple has a five tier gopura, facing east. After crossing the maha mandapa and the artha mandapa the Garbhagriha can be reached. The deity is found in seated position in a calm and composed manner. She has four hands, each having a Kadgam, Kabaalam, Damarugam and Shakthi Hastam. In the shrine of the presiding deity this temple, a Murugan yendiram made of stone on the right side wall is placed.

== Specialities ==
The presiding deity, Muthumariamman, is having the qualities of Muruga. Devotees in order to fulfil their vows take kavadi and 'alaku kuthukuthal' known as piercing the skin, tongue or cheeks. Narada did penance on this hill. So, this place is also called as Naradagiri Malai, referring to the hill of Narada. This hill is found among nine hills known as Mela Malai, Kottai Malai, Kadambar Malai, Parayar Malai, Uvakkan Malai, Alurutti Malai, Bommadi Malai, Man Malai and Pon Malai. In order to give life to those were killed during the Rama-Ravana fight, Hanuman lifted the Sanjeevi Parvatham and was flying with it over the sky. At that time some part felt down and became these hills. They are in the shape of 'Onkara'.

== Festivals ==
During the second Sunday of Tamil month of Panguni, Poochoriyal sprinkling of flowers, is done. During the third Sunday a 10-day festival festival is held. On the ninth day car festival is conducted. Pujas are held four times daily at Kalasanthi (8.00 a.m.), Uttchikkalam (noon 12.00), Sayaratchai (6.00 p.m.) and arthajamam (8.30 p.m.). On the first day of New year, Vijayadashami, Deepavali and Pongal the processional deity would around the temple. More number of devotees would participate during these festivals. On Tuesdays and Fridays devotees in large numbers visit the temple.

== Worship time ==
The temple is opened for worship from 6.00 to 12.00 noon and 4.00 to 8.00 p.m.
