= Masi (month) =

- Native name: Māsi
- Calendar: Tamil calendar
- Month number: 11
- Number of days: 29 or 30
- Season: Pin-pani (pre-vernal)
- Gregorian equivalent: February–March
- Significant days: Maha Shivaratri; Masi Maham; Poochoriyal

Masi is the eleventh month of the Tamil calendar. The name of the month is derived from the position of the Moon near the Magam nakshatra (star) on the pournami (full moon) day. The month corresponds to pin-pani kaalam (pre-vernal season) and falls in February–March in the Gregorian calendar.

In the Hindu lunar calendar, it corresponds to the eleventh month of Magha, falling in the Gregorian months of December–January.

In the Hindu solar calendar, it corresponds to the eleventh month of Kumbha and begins with the Sun's entry into Aquarius.

In the Vaishnav calendar, it corresponds to the eleventh month of Madhava.

== Festivals ==
Maha Shivaratri is a major Hindu Shaiva festival celebrated on Chaturdashi (14th lunar night) thithi of Krishna Paksha (waxing moon) of the month. It is dedicated to worshipping lord Shiva. The festival commemorates several events from Hindu mythology associated with Shiva including his union with Parvati. People remain awake the entire night, while offering prayers, chanting mantras and performing various rituals.

Masi Magam is celebrated when purnima (full moon) aligns with the Magham nakshatra. On this day, temple deities are taken for a procession to water bodies for a ritual bath. People also take a holy dip, which is believed to cleanse them of the sins. Mahamaham is celebrated once in twelve years, when huge gatherings occur at the Mahamaham tank in Kumbakonam.

Poochoriyal is a festival held at the Samayapuram Mariamman Temple. It begins on the last Sunday of the month of Masi, and continues for about 28 days. People bring large quantities of flowers (Tamil:Poo) for the deity. During the festival, the presiding goddess is believed to undertake a fast for 28 days for the welfare of people, and only limited offerings such as buttermilk and tender coconut are made to her.

== See also ==
- Astronomical basis of the Hindu calendar
- Hindu astronomy
