= Sri Mahamariamman Temple =

Sri Mahamariamman Temple may refer to these Mariamman Hindu temples:

- Sri Mahamariamman Temple, Bangkok or Sri Mariamman Temple
- Sri Mahamariamman Temple, Kuala Lumpur
- Seafield Sri Maha Mariamman Temple, Selangor
  - Sri Maha Mariamman Temple riot, 2018
- Sri Mahamariamman Temple, Penang
- Sri Mariamman Temple, Singapore

== See also ==
- Mariamman Temple (disambiguation)
