= Gramadevata =

Village deities in Hinduism

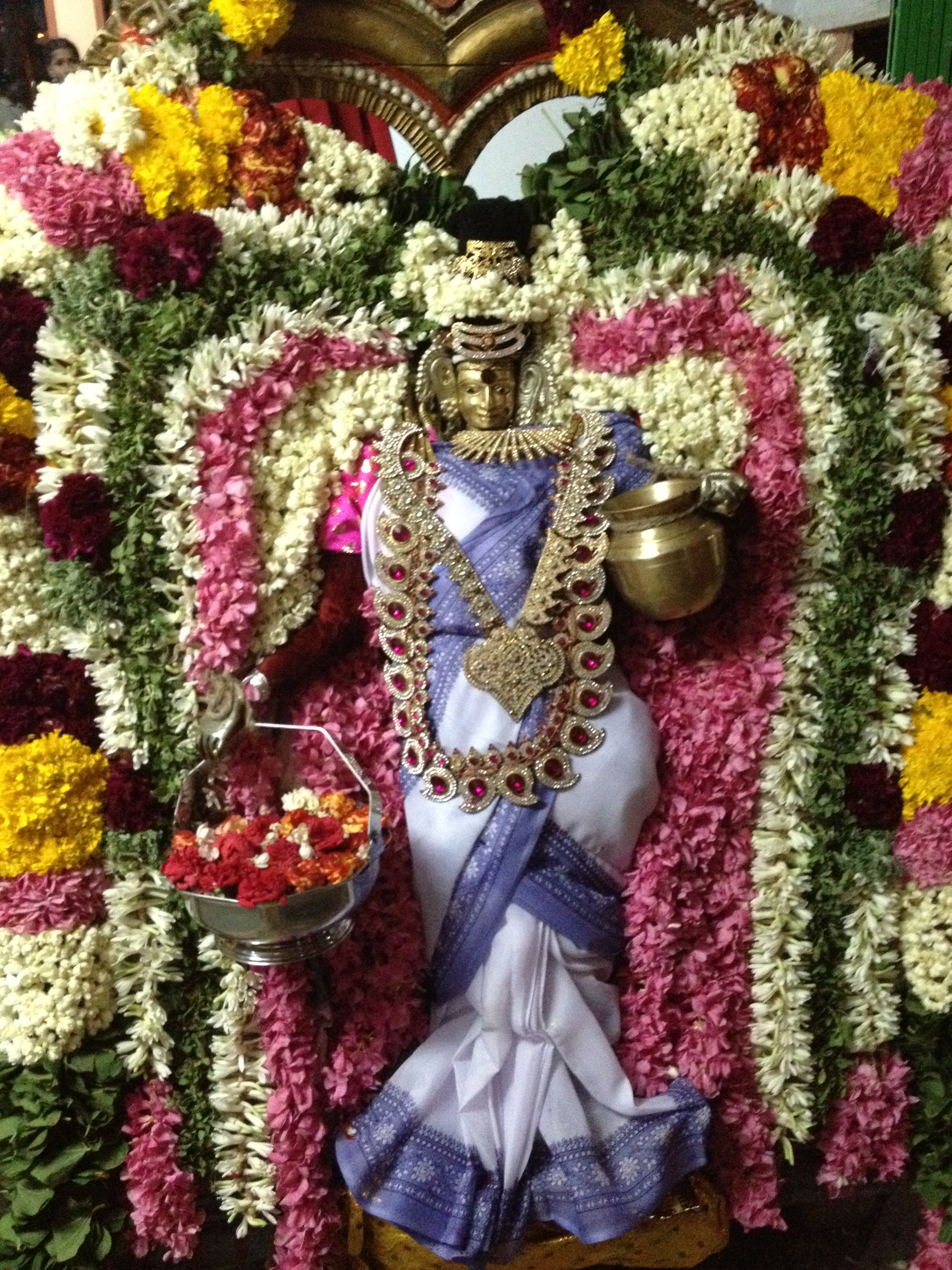
Ellamman, the gramadevata of the village of Nathanallur

A gramadevata (Sanskrit: ग्रामदेवता, romanized: Grāmadevatā, lit. 'village deity') is the tutelary deity of a given locality in Hinduism, primarily worshipped in the villages of India.

Of diverse origins, gramadevatas are regarded to protect the inhabitants of their villages from bandits, epidemics, and natural disasters when propitiated, failing which they are believed to cause these afflictions. A gramadevata is typically female in South India. In this region, a village goddess, acting as a fertility figure, is enshrined, and a guardian of the village is situated at the village boundary.

== Etymology ==
The term gramadevata is derived from the Sanskrit words grāma, "village, village settlement" and devatā, "deity".

== Development ==
The earliest appearance of the "Mother Goddess" found in South Asia is in Mehrgarh in the form of female terracotta figurines dating to the 4th millennium BCE. These figurines are believed to represent the "Mother Goddess." Similar female figurines are found in 3rd-2nd millennium figures from Harappan civilization sites, including a woman with a plant emerging from her womb and a woman in a tree (believed to be a goddess) being worshipped by another woman, with seven figures below. Due to their association with agriculture, the idea of the earth spirit of bhumi is still a common association with villages today just as it was in Harappan times. Evidence of continued veneration of a female village deity comes from a terracotta fragment Chandraketugarh from what is now eastern West Bengal dating to the 1st century BCE. The plaque shows a figure holding a parasol, evidently a goddess, being worshipped with earthen pots, fruits, flowers and other offerings similar to those given to modern-day village goddesses. Another group of common iconography related to gramadevatas are the sapta matrika, the "seven mothers." The first mention of these goddesses occurs in the later layers of the Mahabharata dating to the 1st century CE, and their lack of mention in the Vedas indicates a non-Vedic origin for these goddesses. In addition to the fertility goddesses, the various disease goddesses include deities described with unappealing physical characteristics like Mariamman and Mata. These goddesses could be represented in the Harappan period by a goddess with weapons in her hair. Similarly, goddesses absorbed into Puranic Hinduism, like Durga, appear around the 1st century BCE–1st century CE.

== Legend ==
A South Indian legend states that the gramadevatas trace their origin to the first Shakti, created by the Supreme Being. Nine forms of this Shakti, collectively designated as the Navashakti, were created. Due to their arrogance, they were banished from heaven to the earth, where they were assigned the task of protecting mankind from evil and malicious forces. Thus, the gramadevatas are honoured for their duty through festivals and temples dedicated to their worship.

== Veneration ==
Gramadevatas are believed to serve as the protectors of fields and the general countryside, preventing plagues, famines, pestilence, war, as well as natural disasters. They are also venerated to honour their task of guarding villagers from evil. These deities, predominantly goddesses, possess both benevolent and malevolent features, to mark their roles as gentle to supplicants, and also fierce to wrongdoers. They are associated with agriculture, harvests, rain, and are regarded to be embodiments of fertility. These deities are often venerated in the open fields, or in the form of shrines. Most of them are not accompanied by a male consort. Their shrines could sometimes be composed of a pile of stones or a flag. While some of these shrines are maintained and served by priests, others merely have a keeper who is not accorded a special status. Gramadevatas often share common suffixes in their names, such as amman or amma, the Dravidian root word for mother, or ai. Animal sacrifices and blood are often served as offerings to placate these goddesses by their devotees, including chickens, goats, and occasionally buffaloes, traditionally requiring them to be male.

=== Syncretism ===
While various gramadevatas possess discrete worlds and forms of worship from mainstream Hinduism, others have been syncretised as members of the greater pantheon of Hindu deities. For instance, the deity Venkateshvara, a form of Vishnu, is regarded by local adherents to be the brother of Gangamma, a gramadevata. Mainstream Hindu deities and gramadevatas are often ritually worshipped together due to their integrated traditions. Due to the prevalence of Vaishnavism and Shaivism, it is common to find representations of male gramadevatas as forms of Vishnu and Shiva, and female gramadevatas as forms of Lakshmi and Parvati. Few gramadevatas, such as Ganesha, have been completely adopted into Puranic Hinduism.

== Examples ==
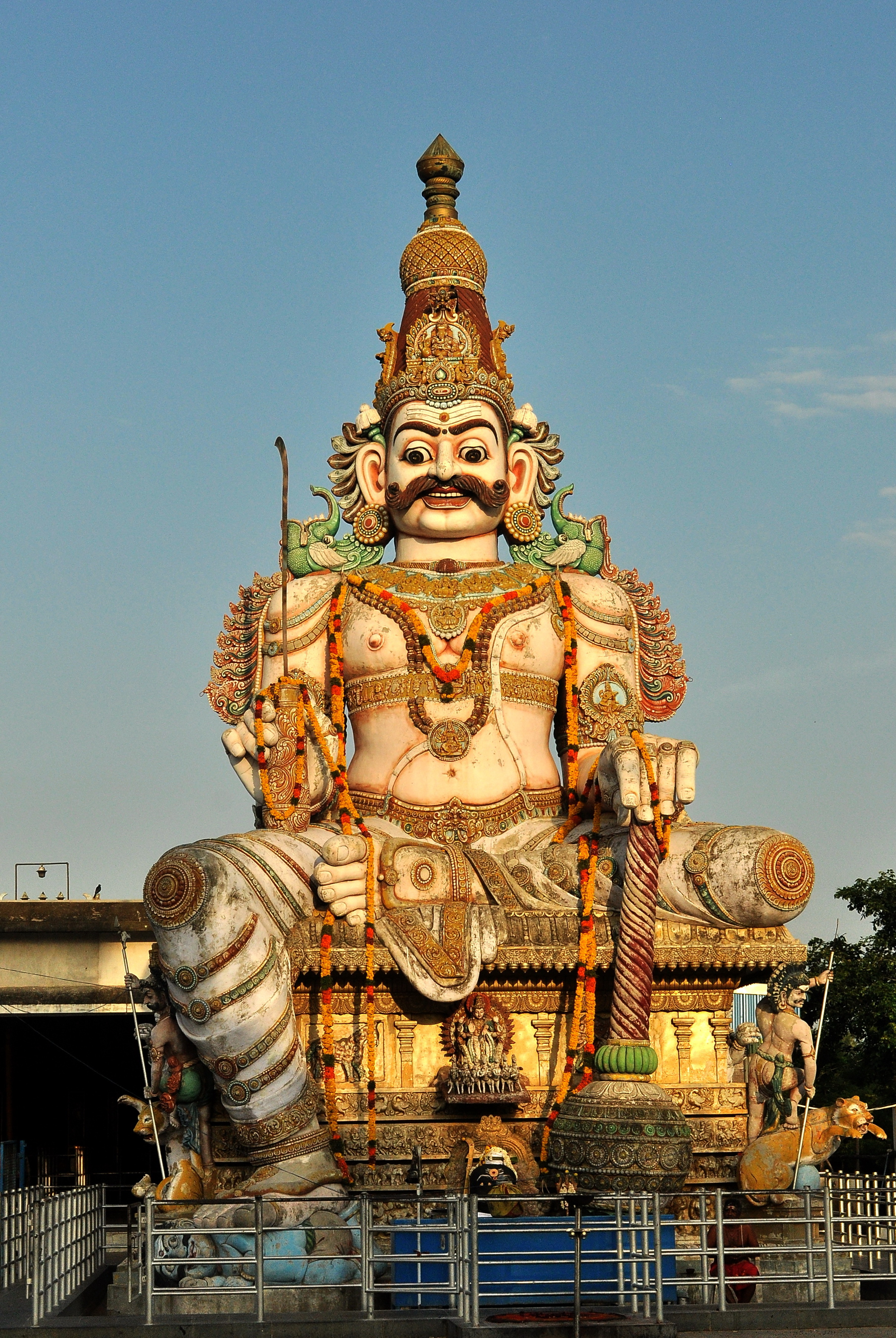
Statue of Munishvarar, a male gramadevata

- Ankalamman
- Mariamman
- Dharmathakur
- Ellamman
- Bhadrakali
- Pitari
- Ugratara
- Siparia Mai
- Dharmathakur
- Kala Bhairava
- Jathera
- Kasba Ganapati
- Maisamma
- Poleramma

== Gallery ==
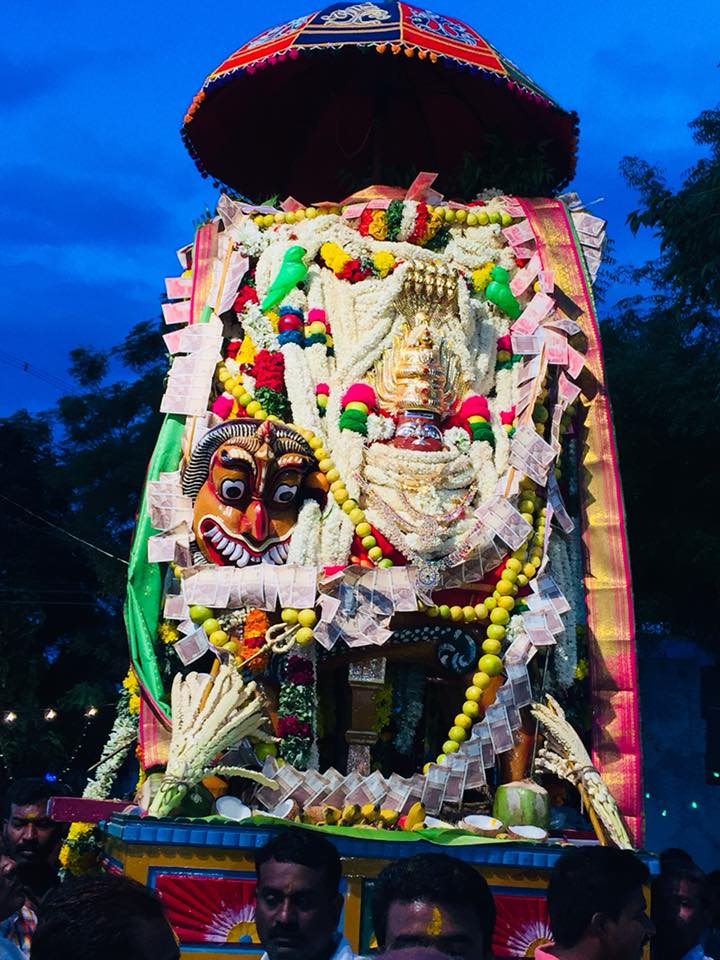
Mariamman in a temple festival procession

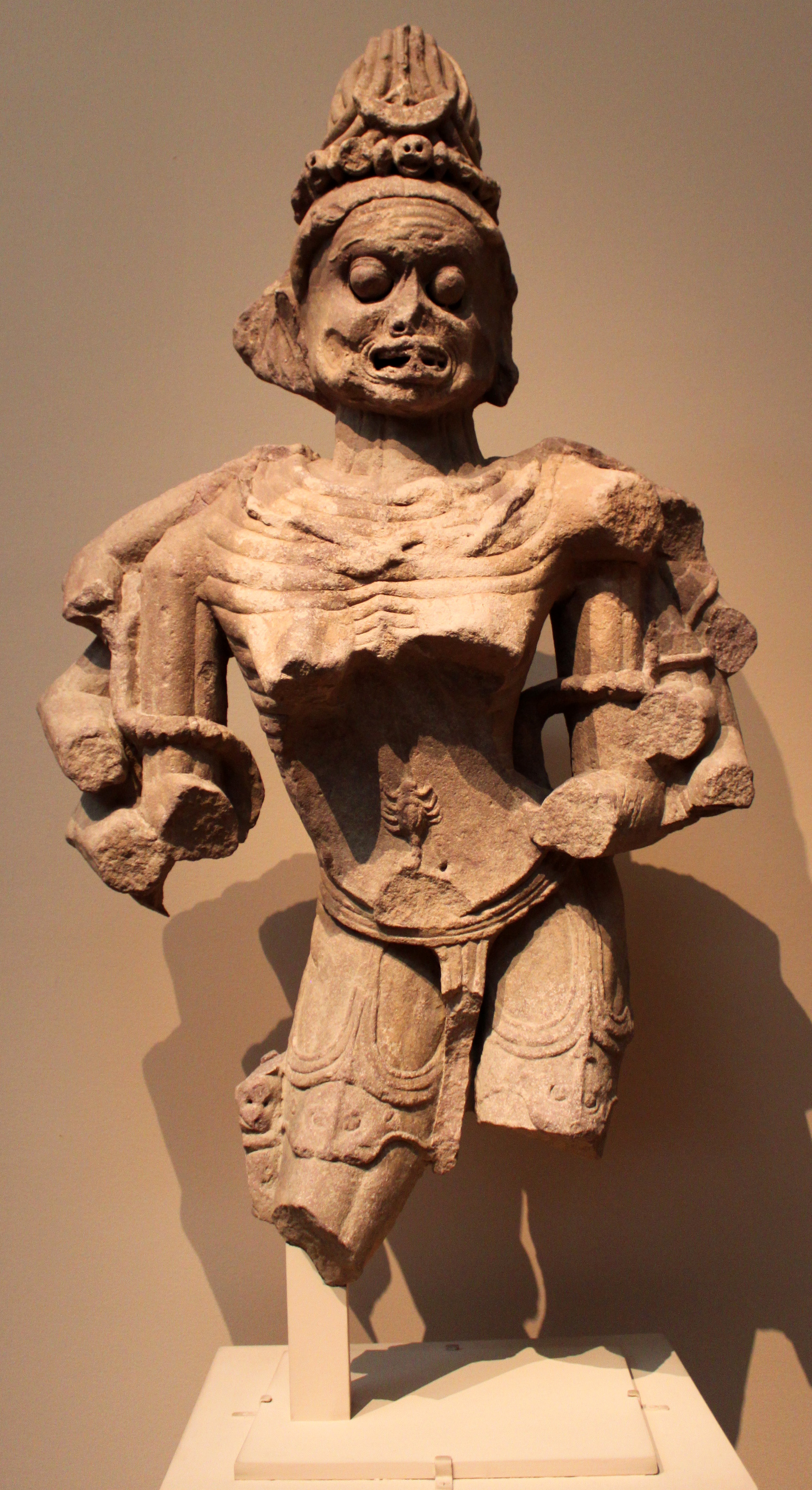
Sculpture of Chamunda

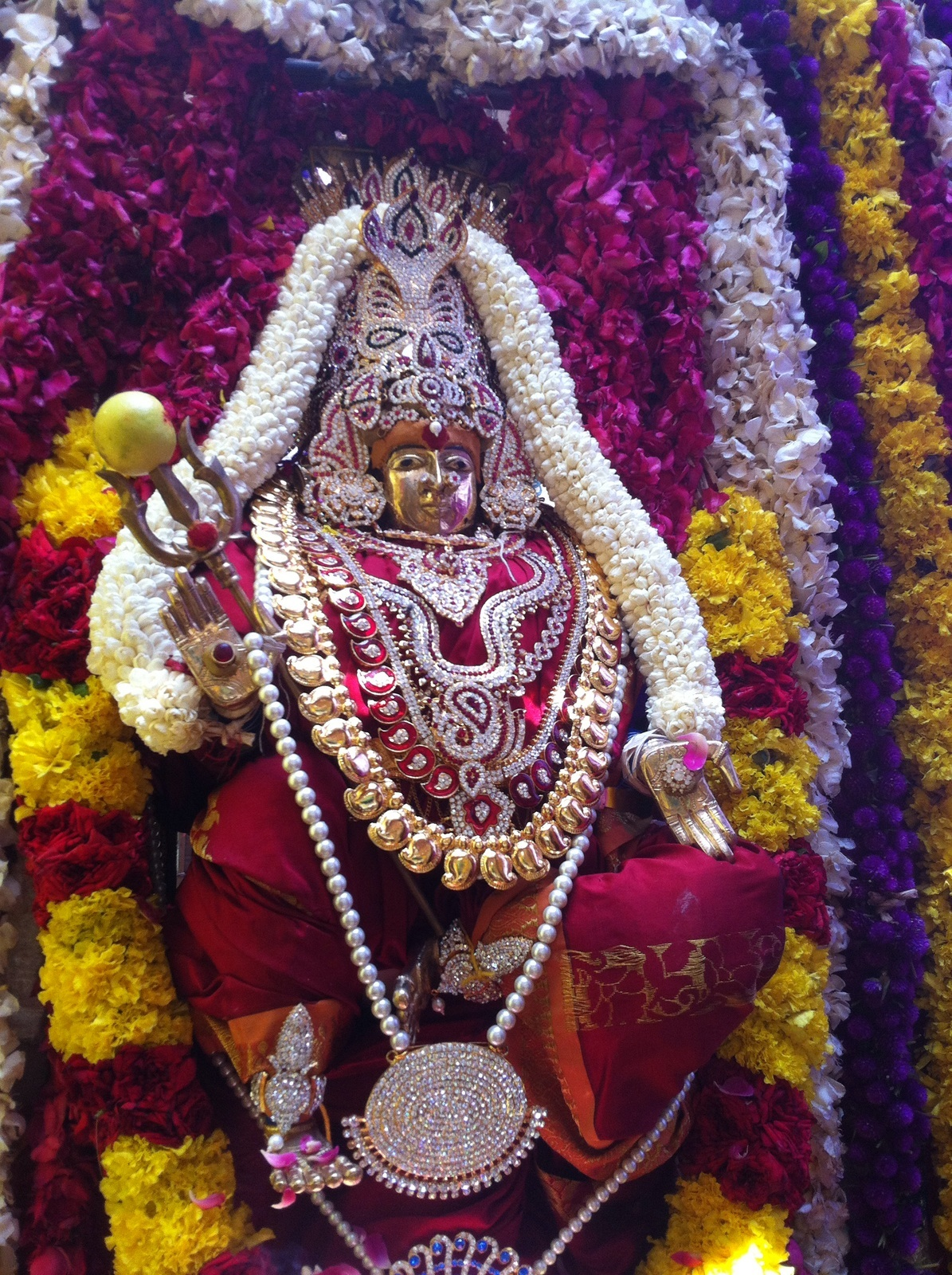
Bhadrakali Amman

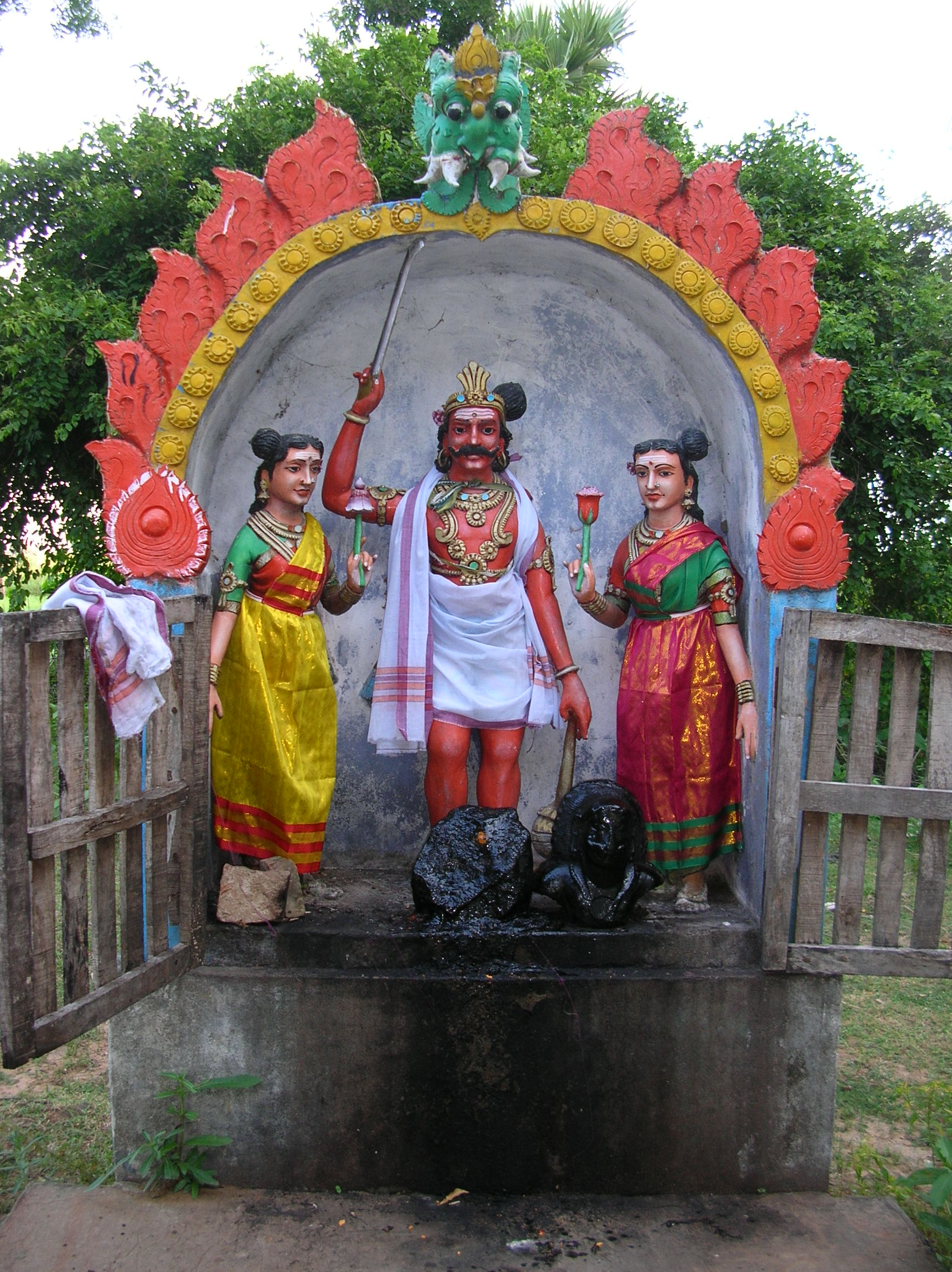
Ayyanar, a guardian kuladevata, accompanied by two consorts

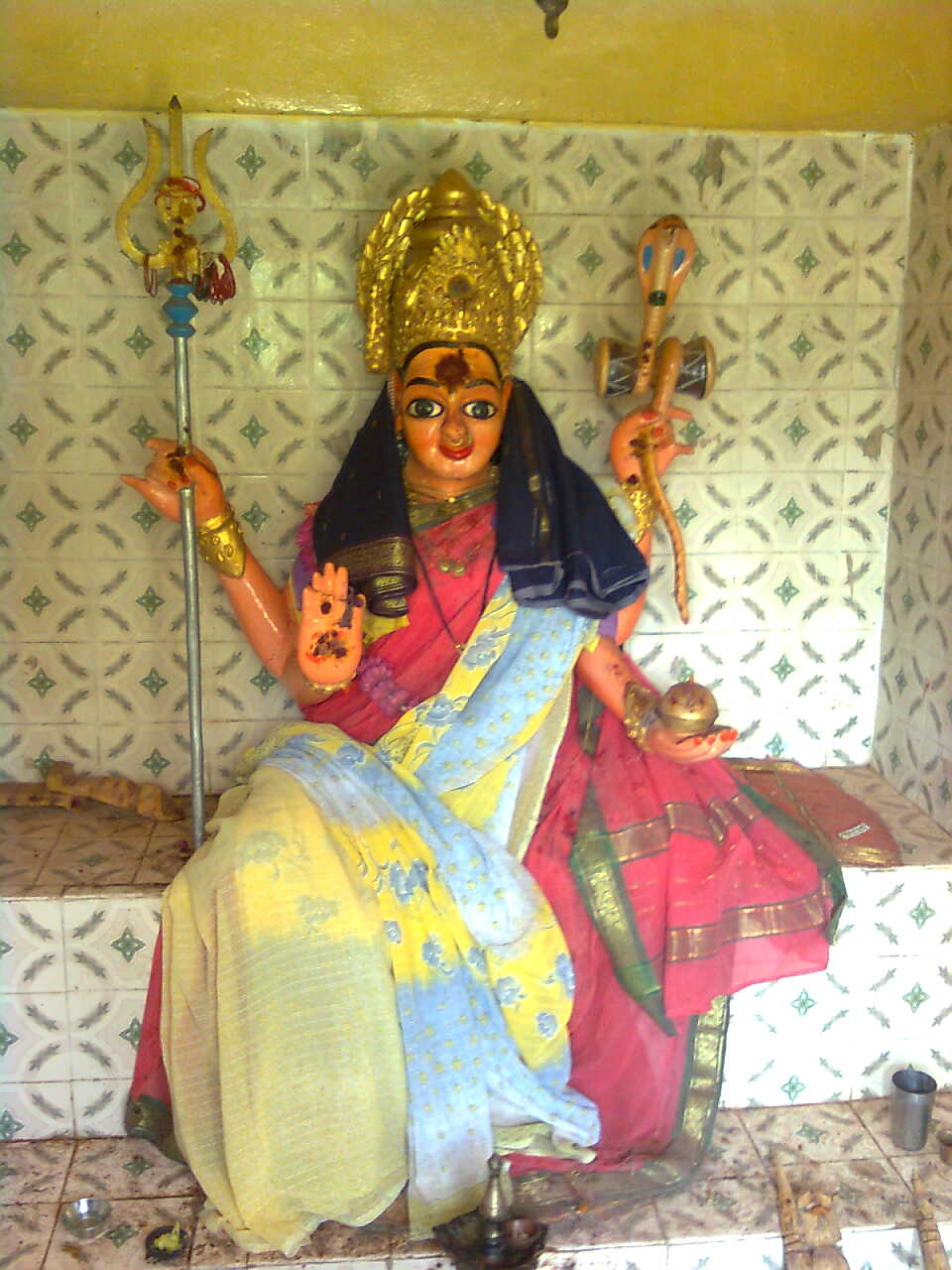
The goddess Muthyalamma, the kuladevata of Gudilova
