= Pidari =

Hindu folk goddess

- Member of Navasakti
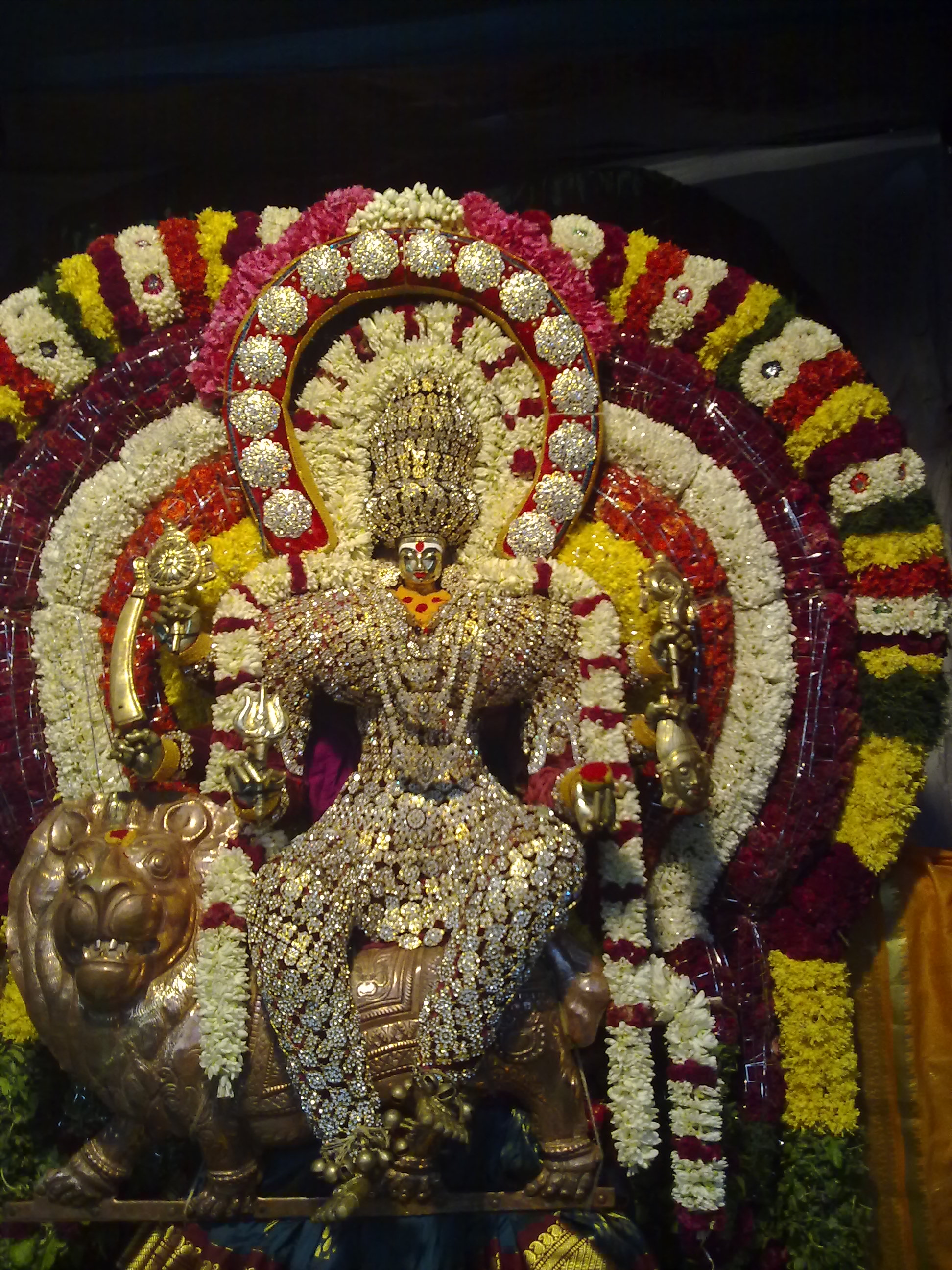
- Idol of the deity at Salem
- Other names: Durga, Mariamman, Bhadrakali
- Animals: Snake
- Region: Tamil Nadu
- Consort: Shiva

Pidari (Tamil: பிடாரி) is a Tamil Hindu deity. She is regarded to be one of the nine aspects of Shakti (Navashakti), who are the consorts of the Trimurti in local tradition. In some traditions, she is depicted to be a snake-catcher, and a consort of Shiva.

== Iconography ==
This village goddess possesses most of the attributes of Kali. Her attributes are the cup, fire, noose, and trident. She may also have snakes coiled around her breasts.

She may be represented by a stone. Temples that venerate her do so under the name of Pidari Amman.

== Legend ==
Pidari, along with her other members of the Navashakti, were once glorious, but their arrogance caused them to be banished to the earth. They were offered the task of overseeing the affairs of human beings and protecting them, which they undertook. This caused them to be venerated by the rural folk who celebrated festivals in their honour, and hence they became gramadevatas.

== Cult ==
The cult of Pidari evolved as a synthesis of the native mother goddess with an aspect of the goddesses Kali and Mariamman, and is invoked in many villages to ward off evil and demons. The cult was featured in regional literature by the seventh century CE, and was primarily centered in Tamil Nadu. Her cult moved on, and reached a climax in eastern India between the eighth and twelfth centuries.

== See also ==
- Isakki
- Sudalai Madan
- Shitala
- Mariamman
- Kali

== Bibliography ==
- Jordan, Michael, Encyclopedia of Gods, New York, Facts On File, Inc. 1993, p. 205
