= Mariamman Koil, Pilakool =

Hindu temple in Pilakool, Kerala, India

Mariamman Koil in Pilakool is a temple dedicated to the Hindu god Mariamman. It is located near Saidarpalli, the south part of Thalassery, in Kerala, India. The deity in this temple is believed to be formed on its own around Ninety years ago. All the rituals are continued and maintained till date in Tamil tradition.

The annual festival of temple commences on the first Tuesday in April every year and lasts for five days. Shakthi Karakam, Agnikarakam, Sumangali Pooja, Poomithi, Kurithikuli, Balipooja are the vital features of the annual festival. After the Annual festival, Special Abhishegam, Vadamala Pooja and Annadanam are organised on the following Monday. The temple follows one of the most traditional tamil style pooja forms and is credited to be one of the most sought temples in this region.

The temple was initially maintained by the Shri P P Appu Master till his heavenly abode in 2010. Shri P P Appu Master was a teacher by profession (ret. from St.Josephs Boys School Tly)and had established a school namely Jagannath Hindi Vidyalayam, in Thalassery. The chief priest of the temple is Shri. Rethnavel, commonly known as Mani Mash (Mani Master), son of P P Appu master.

== See also ==
- Temples of Kerala
