= Poochoriyal =

Poochoriyal is a Tamil festival celebrated in the Samayapuram Mariamman Temple near Tiruchirappalli, India. It begins on the last Sunday of the month of Masi, and continues for about 28 days. People bring large quantities of flowers (Tamil:Poo) for the deity. During the festival, the presiding goddess is believed to undertake a fast for 28 days for the welfare of people, and only limited offerings such as buttermilk and tender coconut are made to her.
