= Mariamman Temple, Pretoria =

Hindu temple in Pretoria, South Africa

Coordinates: 25.739423°S 28.175898°E

The Mariamman Temple was built in 1905 and is the oldest Hindu temple in Pretoria, South Africa, located in the suburb of Marabastad. The temple is dedicated to Mariamman, the goddess who followers of Hinduism believe controls smallpox and other infectious diseases.
