= Mariamman =

Hindu goddess of weather

- Goddess of Weather, Fertility, and Health
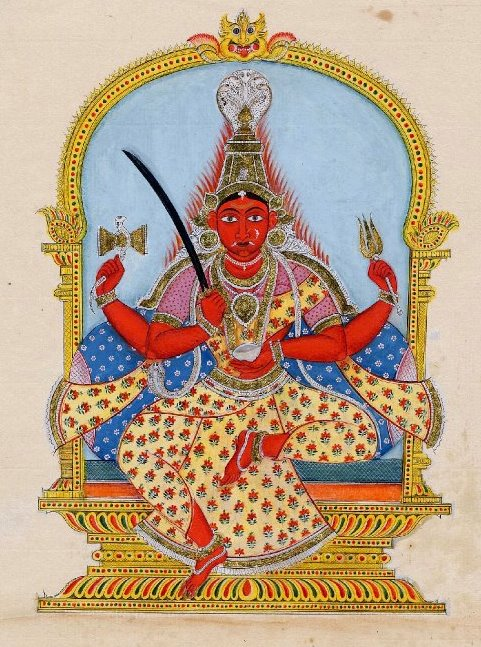
- Painting of Mariamman, Tamil Nadu, circa 1820 CE
- Other names: Amman, Renuga, Mariamma, Mariyamman, Muthu Mariamman, Mariatha, Mari, Amma, Ambika, Karumari, Karumariamman, Parashakti, Adi Parashakti, Pidari
- Venerated in: South India
- Affiliation: Durga, Devi, Shakti, Adi Parashakti, Mahadevi, Kali, Parvati, Tripura Sundari, Shitala, Draupadi, Rukmini, Sita, Indrani, Renuka, Ambika, Pidari
- Abode: Earth
- Weapon: Trident, sword, noose
- Animals: Snake, lion
- Symbols: Neem trees/leaves, trident, kumkum, cobras, Damaru
- Adherents: Primarily rural Tamil Hindus, South Indian Hindus
- Mount: Lion
- Temples: Samayapuram Mariamman; Punnainallur Mariamman; Tiruverkadu Devi Karumariamman Temple; Dindigul Kottai Mariamman
- Festivals: Navaratri, Adi Thiruvila

Mariamman (IPA: [maːrijamman]), often abbreviated to Amman, is a Hindu goddess of weather. Predominantly venerated in the rural areas of South India, Her worship mainly focuses on bringing rains and curing such serious diseases as cholera, smallpox, and chicken pox. She is a form of Mahadevi, and an aspect of Kali or Durga.

Mariamman is worshipped in accordance with local traditions such as Pidari, Muthumariamman, Karumariamman, Renuka, Draupadi or the gramadevatai. She is considered as a guardian deity (kaval deivam) by many South Indian village dwellers. Her festivals are held during the late summer/early autumn season of Ādi throughout Tamil Nadu and the Deccan region, the largest being the Ādi Thiruviḻa. She is worshipped in Karnataka as Marikambe, who is a manifestation of Adi-Parashakti or Mahadevi, and in Maharashtra, where she is known as Mari Aai or Laxmi Aai.

== Origin ==
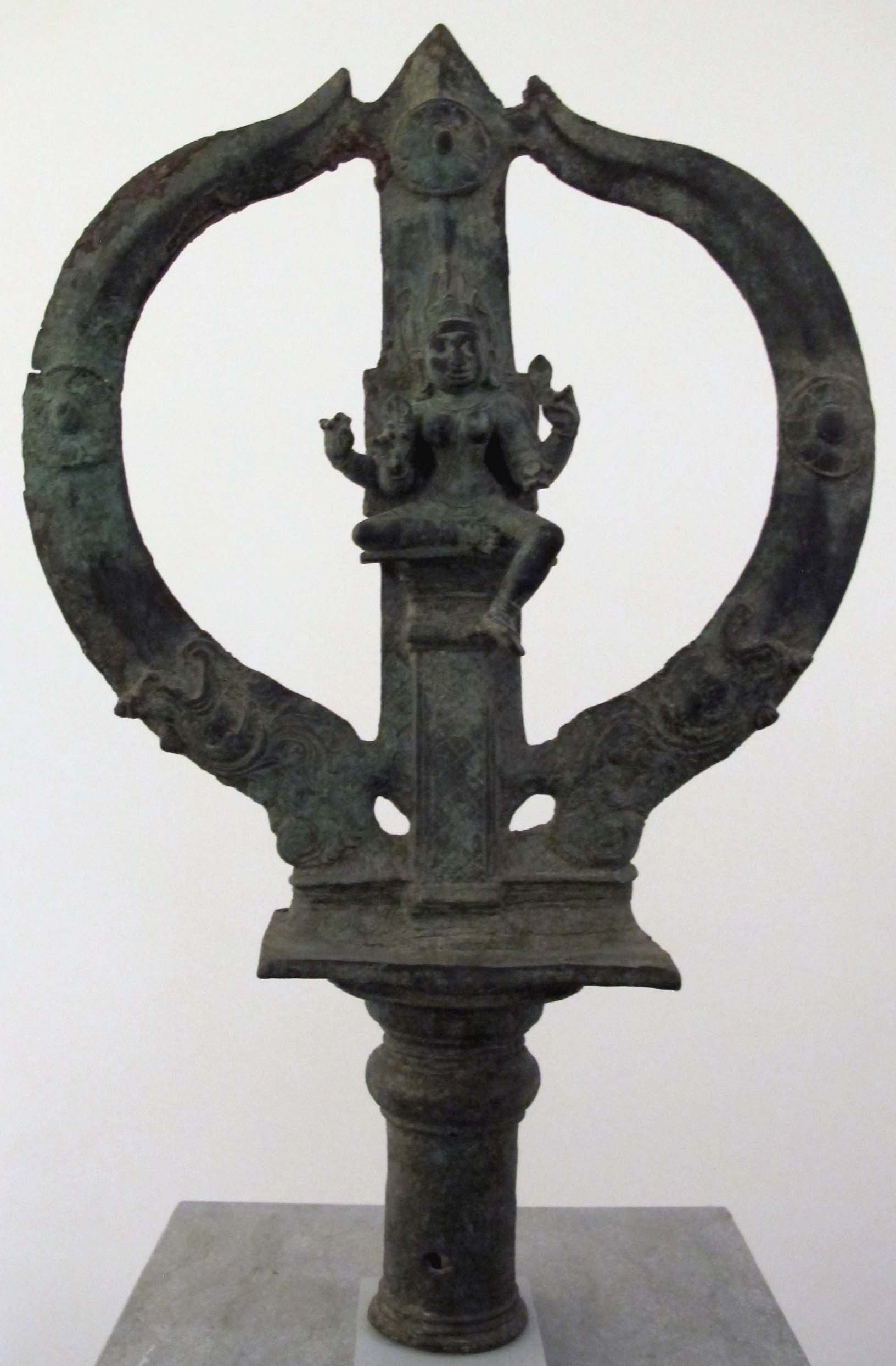
Mariamman embedded in a trident, 1st century, Chola period, Tamil Nadu, India

Mariamman's worship originated in the traditions of Dravidian folk religion. She is the main Tamil mother goddess, predominantly venerated in the rural areas of South India. Mariamman has been associated with Hindu goddesses such as Parvati, Kali, Durga, Rukmini, Sita, Draupadi, as well as with her northern Indian counterpart Shitala, her eastern Indian counterpart, Olai Chandi; and her western Indian counterpart of Mogal mata.

The word Mari (pronunciation: /mɒri/) has the Sangam Tamil origin meaning "Rain", and the Dravidian root term Amman means "Mother". She was worshipped by the ancient Tamil as the bringer of rain and also the bringer of prosperity, since the abundance of their crops was dependent largely upon adequate rainfall. The cult of the mother goddess is treated as an indication of a society that venerated femininity. The temples of the Sangam days, mainly of Madurai, seem to have had priestesses to the deity, which also appear predominantly as goddesses. In Sangam literature, there is an elaborate description of the rites performed by the Kuravar priestesses in the shrine Palamutircholai.

== Iconography ==
Mariamman is usually pictured as a beautiful young woman with a red-hued face, wearing a red dress. Sometimes she is portrayed with many arms—representing her many powers—but in most representations she has only two or four. Also described to be wearing snakes as jewelry.

Mariamman is generally portrayed in the sitting or standing position with a five-headed serpent over her head, often holding a trident (trishula) in one hand and a bowl (kapala) in the other. One of her hands may display a mudra, usually the abhaya mudra, to ward off fear. She'll also be seen with a damru in one hand which has a serpent wrapped around it; She may be represented with two demeanours—one displaying her pleasant nature, and the other her terrifying aspect, with fangs and a wild mane of hair.

== Legends ==
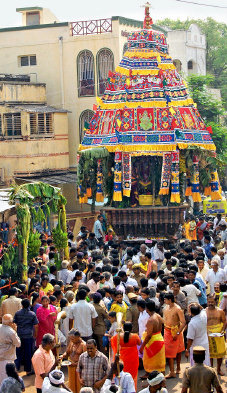
Erode Mariamman Ther Thiruvizha

The origin of the goddess Mariamman in terms of a consistent and coherent legend has not been standardized. Several myths of the mother goddess exist in several regional traditions that are spread orally throughout South India.

According to a regional Hindu legend, there was once a beautiful woman named Nagavalli, wife to a rishi named Piruhu. When the rishi was away, the Trimurti, the deities of Brahma, Vishnu, and Shiva, visited her, seeking to decide for themselves if she was truly as beautiful and virtuous as she was supposed to be. Nagavalli, not recognising them, and resenting their intrusion, turned them into children with her powers. The deities were infuriated and cursed her, causing her face to become disfigured with smallpox. When Piruhu returned, he drove her away, informing her that she would be born on earth, causing her affliction to human beings as well.

According to the Vanniyars, an agrarian community, Draupadi, the common wife of the Pandavas, is said to be an incarnation of the goddess Shakti. Draupadi, despite being Shakti, lived like a normal woman, suppressing her supernatural powers. While they were in exile, when the Pandavas were asleep at night, she would travel to the villages of Vanniyar in the form of a fierce looking Goddess. Vanniyars would offer her prayers and barley, which pleased her. In time, she would be called Mariamman (the mother of rain and curing diseases), and became popular in the Vanniyar villages.

According to the narrative of the higher varnas, there was once a pariah boy who impersonated a Brahmin suitor in order to marry a Brahmin girl. This lie is discovered by the girl when she discerns the jargon and non-vegetarian habits of her in-laws. In order to ritually purify herself from the pollution of being married to a low-born pariah, the girl self-immolates. This Brahmin girl is deified and named as Mariamman, and becomes the goddess of the pariahs.

In another version, Mariamman was once a woman named Vasuki who was the wife of Thiruvalluvar a tamil poet, and who was an outcast. She caught smallpox and went begging house to house for food, fanning herself with neem leaves to keep flies away. Eventually she recovered and is then worshipped as Mariamman, goddess of smallpox.

The most popular narrative of Mariamman, has to do with the story of Renuka. She was once a women named Renuka, wife to sage Jamadagni and mother to Parasurama the sixth avatar of Vishnu. Renuka lost her powers after being attracted to a scene by the lake, when her husband Jamadagni found out he became furious. He sent his son Parasurama to kill Renuka. Renuka ran for her life and took shelter in a nearby village by a low-caste women, but when Parasurama found her, he decapitated Renuka and the low-caste women. After begging his father to let him bring back his mother and the women, Parasurama accidentally swapped their heads. Renuka's head was on the low-caste women's body and the low-caste women's head on Renuka's body. after this she became Mariamman "the changed mother".

In northern India, Shitala is worshipped in a similar way, predominantly by the Rajput/Kshatriya community. Shitala has a legend and plays a similar role in protecting villages from diseases.

== Roles ==
=== Goddess of medicine ===
Mariamman is purported to cure all so-called "heat-based" diseases. During the summer months in South India (March to June), people walk miles carrying pots of water mixed with turmeric and neem leaves to ward off such illnesses as measles and chicken pox, which were believed to spread more in that season.

=== Fertility goddess ===
Devotees also pray to Mariamman for familial welfare such as fertility, healthy progeny or a good spouse. The most favoured offering is "pongal", a mix of rice and green gram, cooked mostly in the temple complex, or shrine itself, in terracotta pots using firewood.

Some festivals in honour of the goddess Mariamman involve night-time processions of devotees carrying oil lamps. Mariamman is the family deity for many in the Thanjavur district of Tamil Nadu. It is a custom initially to worship the family deity on occasions such as weddings. The worship of a 'family deity' (kuladevata), considered most important in any Hindu festival, continues down the generations, providing a clue to the family's origin, since the family deities are usually located within the vicinity of the village to which the family originally belonged.

== Worship ==
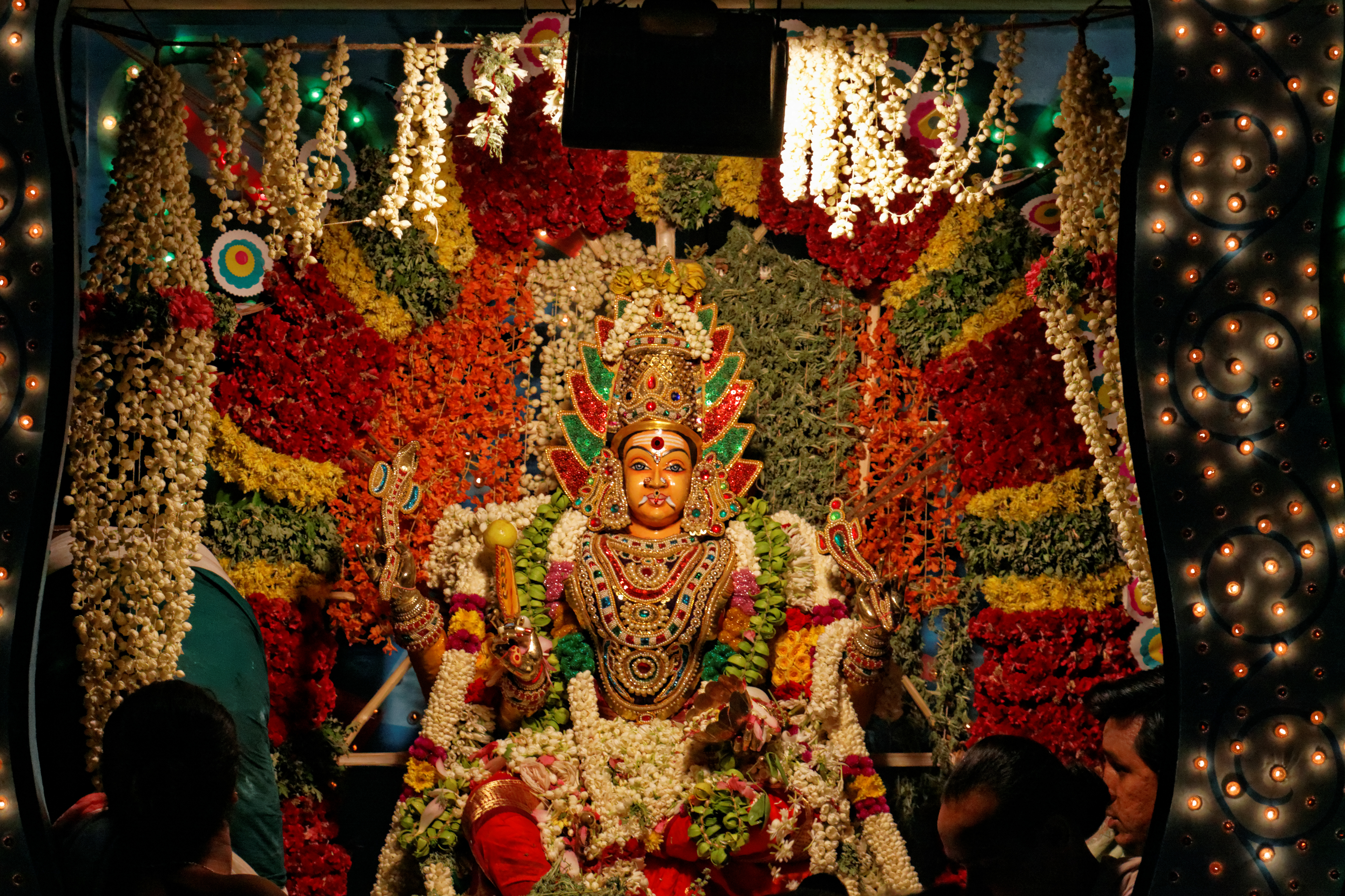
Procession of Mariamman

The worshipping methods are often accompanied by various kinds of folk dancing. Offerings such as pongal and koozh that are cooked using earthen pots are also made during the festive season. Rituals such as fire walking and mouth or nose piercing are also practised.

At the Samayapuram Mariamman Temple in Samayapuram, the Hindu system of worship is still seen today for the worship of Mariyamman, which involves a ten-day festival organized by temple authorities during the second week in April. Some continue to use an old village custom of worship by offering chickens and goats to the deity, though the animals are no longer sacrificed but sold after being offered. The main worship of the goddess occurs on the road a mile or two from the temple. A hurried walk and dance carry hundreds of thousands of worshippers along the road to the temple. Many in the crowd have fasted, shaved their heads, and wear bright yellow clothes which are sacred to the goddess. Women and children may carry a pot on their heads decorated with the goddess's favourite leaves, of the margosa tree. Young men and women, carrying similar pots, are followed by drummers and dance more wildly. Larger men and women carry pots of charcoal fire. Some put themselves through a special tribulation of having one of the sacred weapons, dagger, trident, or spear, inserted through their cheeks or tongues. Through this worship each individual achieves self-realization and awareness of others through samsara and moksha. In this self-realization a bonding with the goddess occurs, which is the underlining reason for the worship.

=== Mulaikottu ===
Mulaikottu is a village festival celebrated in southern Tamil Nadu, particularly in villages of Madurai, Sivagangai, Dindugul, Ramanathapuram, Thoothukudi and Thirunelveli districts. By doing so they believe that they can get her blessing and sufficient rain for better cultivation. This festival is generally celebrated in between any Tamil month of panguni to Purattasi. The festival lasts for 11 days. (Sunday of first week to Wednesday of second week).

On the auspicious beginning of the village festival, a village meeting will be convened to sort out the best suitable date for the celebration of Mulaikottu. Before fixing any date, the pradhana and secretary of the village gather some information from the villagers regarding any marriage or anyone suffering from chicken pox etc. If anyone is affected by chicken pox, any sudden death occurred or someone's marriage is taking place, under these circumstances the date of mulaikottu will be either postponed or cancelled according to the public opinion at the meeting. The celebration begins with collection of nine different types of grain seeds from every house, called thandal in Tamil. The Thandal will held in Sunday of Valarpirai. The following Tuesday is the second day of thandal called Pari parapputhal. Next Tuesday, the main function is held on the day called mulaikottu. On the next day of thandal, the temple committee distribute the grains to every house for setting up of pari.

The pari is a clay pot with a wide mouth and narrow base with a hole in the bottom. This utensil is specially made for this purpose and sold at the market. The villagers visit the market and purchase number of paris as they wanted to set up in their home.

The first step to set them up is to clean paris and their home the second day of thandal. People used to collect goat dung and some hay. The hay is used to block the hole of the pari. A layer of goat dung is spread over the hay and watered to make the dung wet. This is the procedure of setting up of pari.

As a next step to this, the received nine type of grains from the temple committee, is smoothly spread over the goat dung on the pari. Following this, a pooja will be arranged for praying the goddess to make the pari a successful one. Every house may have more than two paries. These paries taken into a dark and isolated room in their house. For the next seven days they have to grow the seedlings into a plant. Usage of loudspeaker and crackers are completely banned during this period. During evening, all villagers assemble in front of the Mariamman temple and sing folk songs known as mari pattu and dance folk dances such as mulaikottu ( similar to kummi), Amman oyil. It is followed everyday from thandal Sunday (First day) to next Sunday (eighth day). The ninth day called thangal, means camping. On this day the temple is closed and folk poojas and dances are prohibited. The Amman karagam is made in village water body and the person who fasts in those 10 days is called Ammadi (The person who depicted as Amman). The amandi takes the karagam and gave to temple. All paris are brought into the Amman temple from the houses on the tenth day of thandal. The paris remain in the Amman temple for one night and on the next day (the last day, eleventh day, Wednesday), and after a pooja, the paries will be issued back to their respective member. The Ammadi again takes karagam and the mulaiparis are also taken from the temple. Finally, the amman Karagam and mulaiparis are submerged into the village pond. It is also celebrated in Madurai Meenakshi Amman temple on the Tamil month of Aadi.

=== In the Tamil Diaspora ===
Her worship has been brought over across the Tamil Diaspora in places such as the Caribbean, South Africa, the Mascarenes, Sri Lanka, the Malayosphere, Vietnam, and Fiji where festivities and temples are often done and built in her name. Her trance-worship has been brought via the Girmityas to around the world, where similar traditions to those in Mainland Tamil Nadu are practiced. Often times, Mariamman is syncretized with Kali. While indentured laborers were the primary spreaders of her worship worldwide, often syncretized or adopted by other populations of their host countries, it also received patronage from well-to-do Indian migrants in Ceylon, the Straits Settlements, and Indochina.

== Temples ==
Most temples to Mariamman are simple village shrines, where both male and female priests perform sacred rituals. In many rural shrines, the goddess is represented by a granite stone with a sharp tip, like a spear head. This stone is often adorned with garlands made of limes and with red flowers. These shrines often have an anthill that could be the resting place of a cobra, which is said to be a manifestation of Mariamman. Milk and eggs are offered to propitiate the snake.

Some temples have attained sufficient popularity for Brahmanas to officiate at them. For example, the Samayapuram Mariamman near the shore of river Kaveri in the northern outskirts of Tiruchirapalli, maintains a rich agamic tradition and all rituals are performed by Gurukkalas.

Locations of other Mariamman temples:

- Punainallur, near Thanjavur – Legend says that Mariamman appeared to the King Venkoji Maharaja Chatrapati (1676–1688) of Thanjavur in his dreams and told him she was in a forest of Punnai trees three miles distant from Thanjavur. The King rushed to the spot and recovered an idol of Mariamman from the jungle. On the king's orders, a temple was constructed there, the idol installed, and the place was called Punnainallur. Hence the deity of this temple is known as Punnainallur Mariamman. Mud replicas of different parts of the human body are placed in the temple as offerings by devotees pleading for cures. It is said that the daughter of Tulaja Raja (1729–35) of Thanjavur, who lost her eyesight due to illness, regained it after worshipping at this temple. Shri Sadasiva Brahmendra is said to have made the Moola Murthi of Mariamman from the mud from the ant-hill where snakes had resided.
- Salem – A Kottai Sri Periya Mariamman temple is located in the heart of this city, where the Aadi festival is celebrated for 22 days.
- Veerapandi, Theni
- Anbil (near Trichy)
- Narthamalai
- Thiruverkadu – in Thiruverkadu, goddess Mariamman is worshipped in the form of Karumariamman, where she appeared as a black serpent out of an anthill.
- Virudhunagar
- Sivakasi
- Vellore
- Chennai (Madras) – The Putthu Mariamman derives its name from a Putthu (ant-hill) located on the opposite side of the Velachery Main Road.
- Madurai – The Theppakulam sri Mariamman Temple is a noted focus of devotion, primarily to the goddess and to the Maruthuvachi (= doctor/midwife). Periyachi Amman (or Pechi Amman), who was deified for her skill and heroism. The temple possesses a large theppakulam. Here, the Panguni festival is the main event of the religious calendar. The devotees of Mariamman observe the "poo choridhal" flower festival, and in the month of Aadi many women honour her with fasting and prayer.
- Kaup, Karnataka – This temple is located seven kilometres from the temple town of Udipi.
- Urwa, a residential area of the city of Mangalore – Known familiarly as Urwa Marigudi, many miracles have been reported to occur at this temple through the power of the goddess.

The Erode Mariamman temple festival is celebrated in Tamil Nadu. The worship of three Mariamman goddesses named Small, Medium and Large Mariamman (residing at three separate localities within the city) is combined in a festival every April. It features the Thiruvizha, along with all the other devotions to deities, and ends at the Kaveri river with the purificatory immersion of the Kambam (the effigy of Mariamman's husband Shiva) in the flowing waters of the river.

The Karur Mariamman temple festival is celebrated at the end of May each year in honour of the goddess in Tamil Nadu.

In 2012, the singer Harini composed a song about the Samayapuram Mariamman deity which was featured on the album Om Nava Sakthi Jaya Jaya Sakthi. The song narrates the power of Shakti as Samayapuram Amman and equates the Peruvalai River with Punya Theertham, as do the people in that area.

=== Outside India ===
- Arulmigou Shri Madhur Kannanour Mariamman Thirukkovil, Port-Louis, Mauritius.
- Mariamman Temple, Ho Chi Minh City, Vietnam.
- Mariamman Temple, Bangkok, Thailand.
- Mariamman Temple, Pretoria, South Africa.
- Sri Mahamariamman Temple, Kuala Lumpur, Malaysia.
- Sri Mariamman Temple, Medan, Indonesia.
- Sri Maha Mariamman Temple, Penang, Malaysia.
- Sri Mariamman Temple, Singapore.
- Sri Muthu Mariamman Temple, Negombo, Sri Lanka.
- Sri Muthumariamman Temple, Matale, Sri Lanka.
- Mariamman Temple, Pretoria in South Africa.
- Mari Mata Mandir or Shri Mariamman Temple, Madrasi Para neighborhood of Karachi, in Pakistan.

There are many Mariamman temples outside India, in Mauritius, Malaysia, Singapore, Thailand, Fiji, Fiji Maha Shakti Mata Temple Nadi and Suva, Guyana, Vietnam, Trinidad and Tobago, Germany and South Africa, the product of efforts of the Tamil diaspora. Some notable temples include the Sri Mariamman temple in Singapore, Sri Mariamman temple in Bangkok, a Mariamman temple in Pretoria, South Africa, as well as one in Sri Mariamman Temple, Medan, Indonesia.

There are also many Mariamman temple in every state of Malaysia. Some notable temples include the Queen Street Sri Maha Mariamman Temple, Penang in George Town, Sri Sithala Maha Mariamman Temple, Pekan Getah Tapah, Lorong Kulit Sri Muthu Mariamman Temple in George Town, Sri Rudra Verra Muthu MahaMariamman Temple in Air Itam, Sri Maha Mariamman Devasthanam in Arau, Sri Maha Mariamman Devasthanam in Alor Setar, Sri Maha Mariamman Temple in Sungai Petani, Sri Maha Mariamman Temple in Ipoh, Sri Nagamuthu Mariamman Temple in Taiping, Sri Maha Mariamman Temple in Gopeng, Sri MahaMariamman Temple, Kuala Lumpur, Sri Maha Mariamman Temple in Klang, Sri Maha Mariamman Temple in Chukai, Sri Maha Mariamman Temple in Port Dickson, Sri Maha Mariamman Temple in Kuantan, Sri Veera Sundara Muthu Mariamman in Kulim, Raja Mariamman Temple in Johor Bahru, Sri Maha Muthu Mariamman Temple in Tumpat, Sri Maha Mariamman Temple in Kuching, Sri Maha Mariamman Temple in Sibu, and Sri Muthu Mariamman Temple, Kampung Chetti, Melaka.

There is another very popular temple dedicated to Mariamman in Matale, Sri Lanka.

== Gallery ==
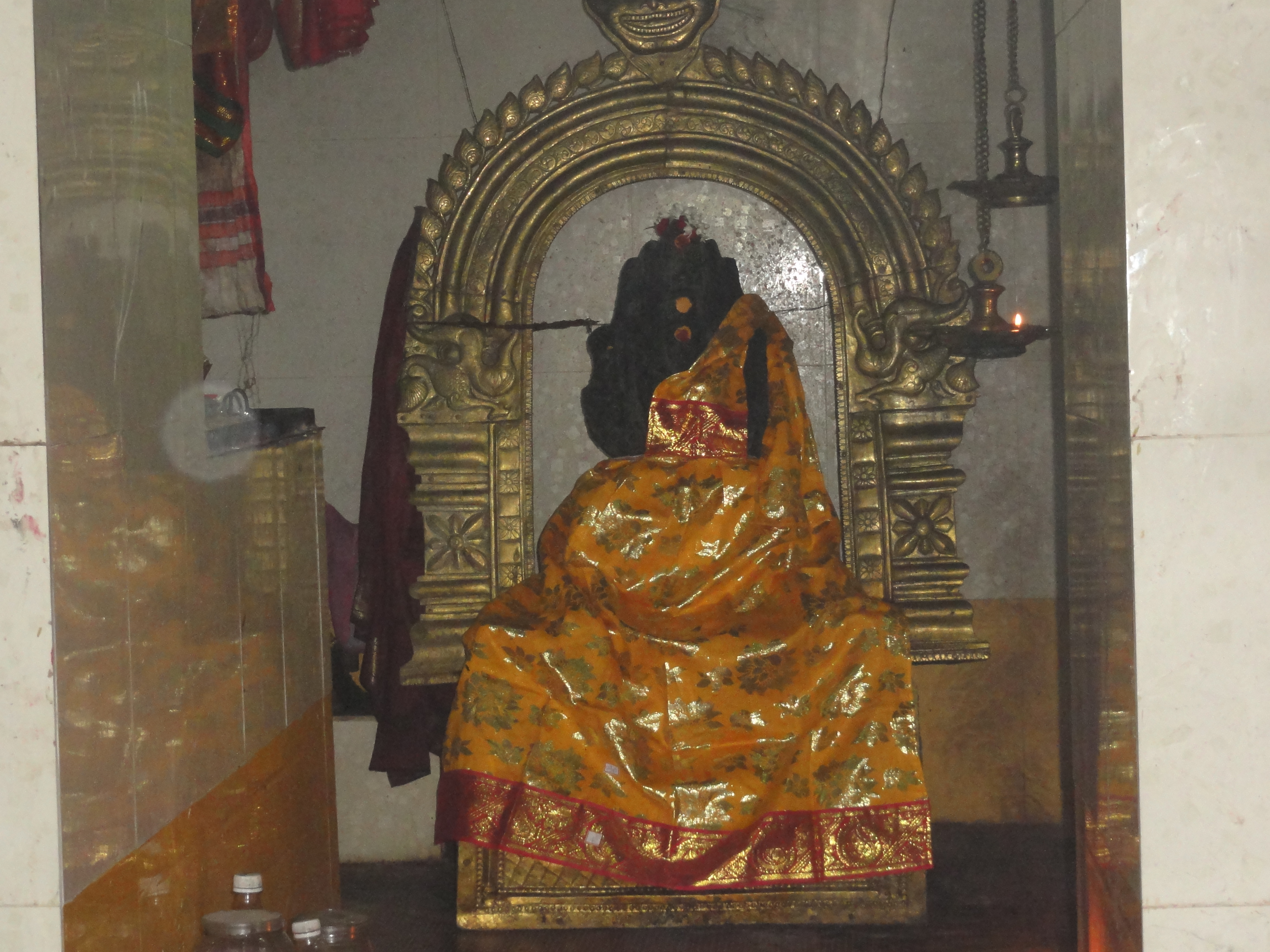
The Nanalthidal Mariamman, Kattucherry near Porayar, Tamil Nadu, India, Jan '13

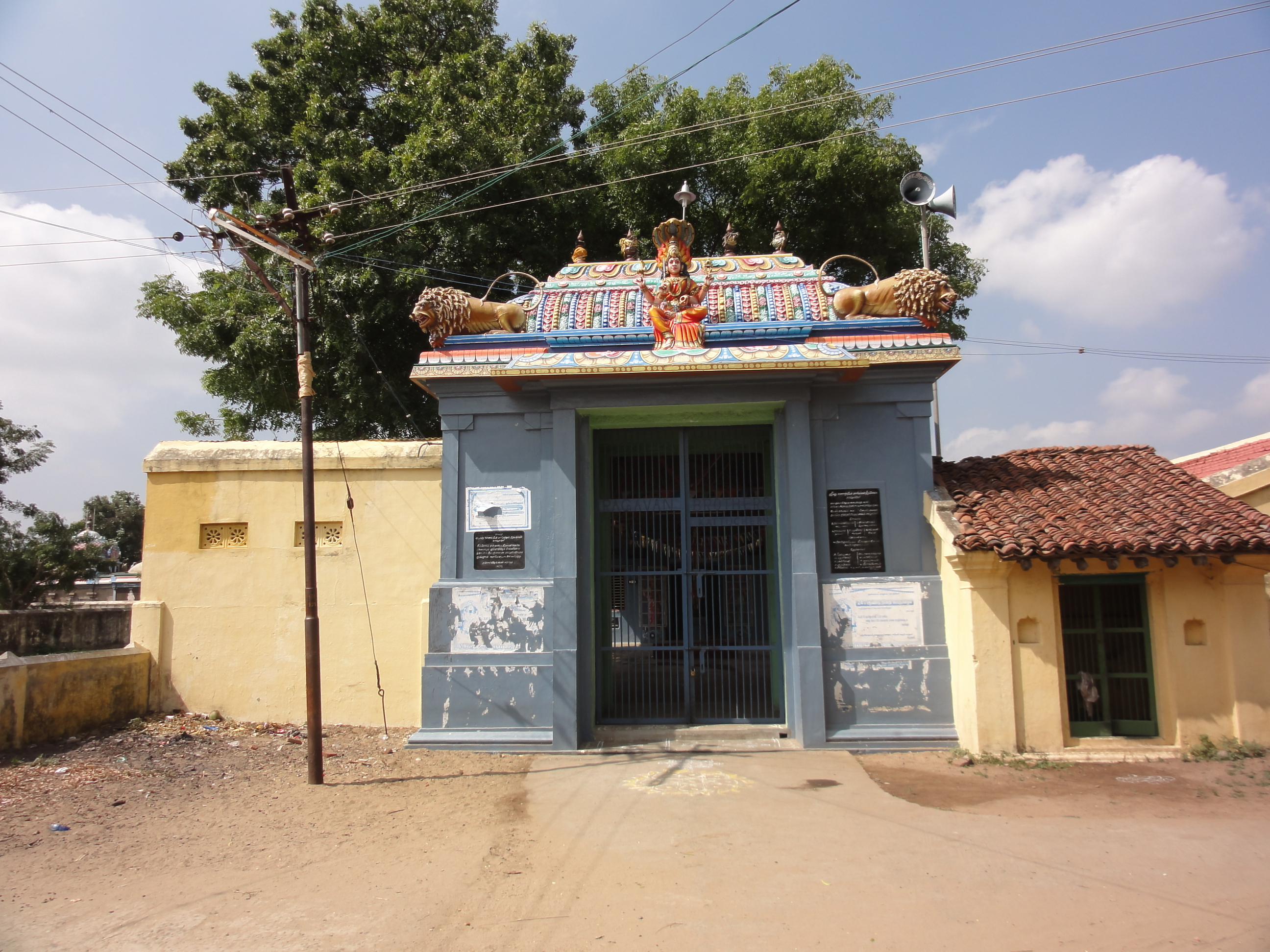
Mariamman temple, Kattucherry village, Tamil Nadu, Jan '13

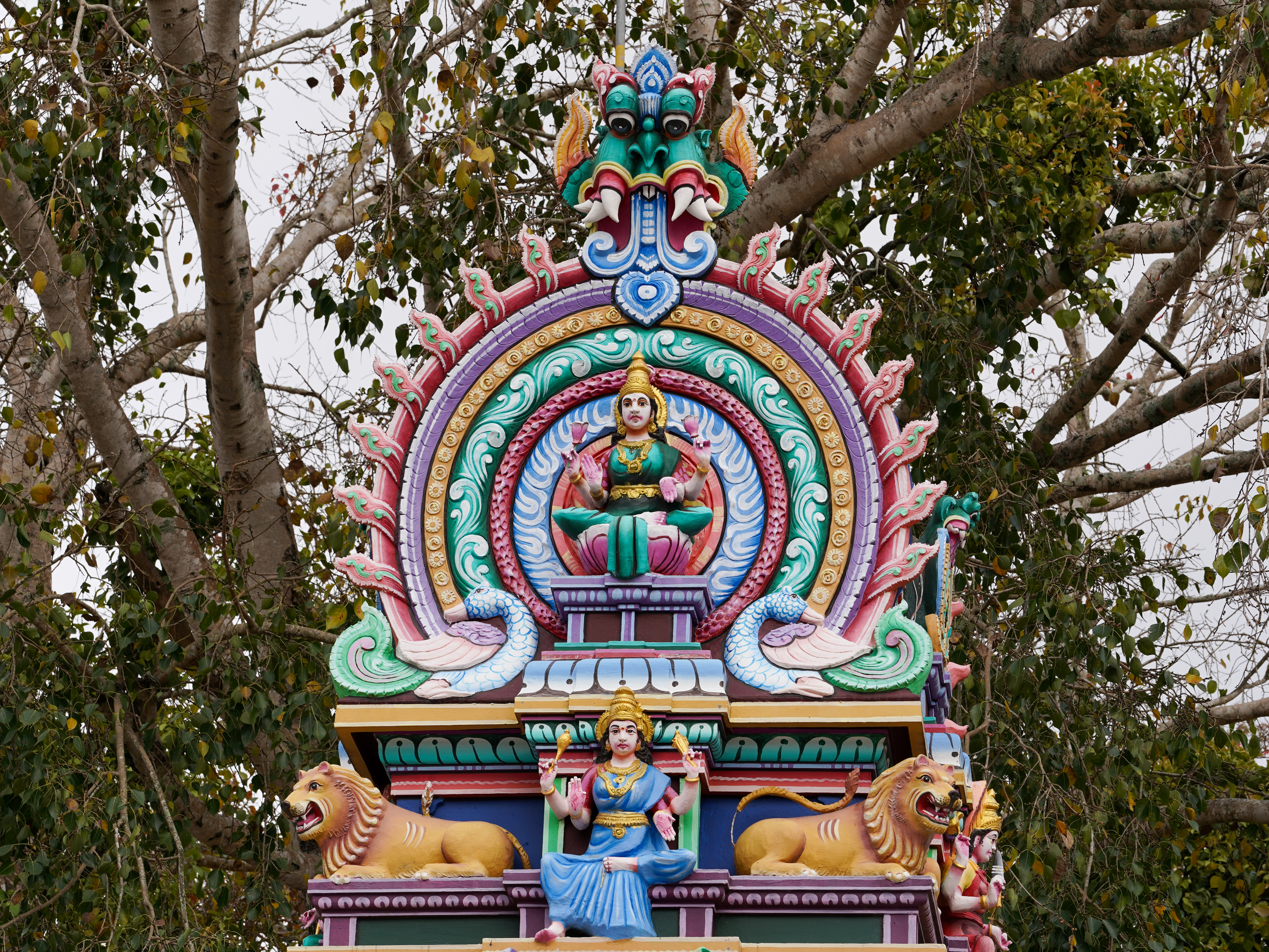
Mariamman temple vimana, Bokkapuram village, Tamil Nadu, Mar '21

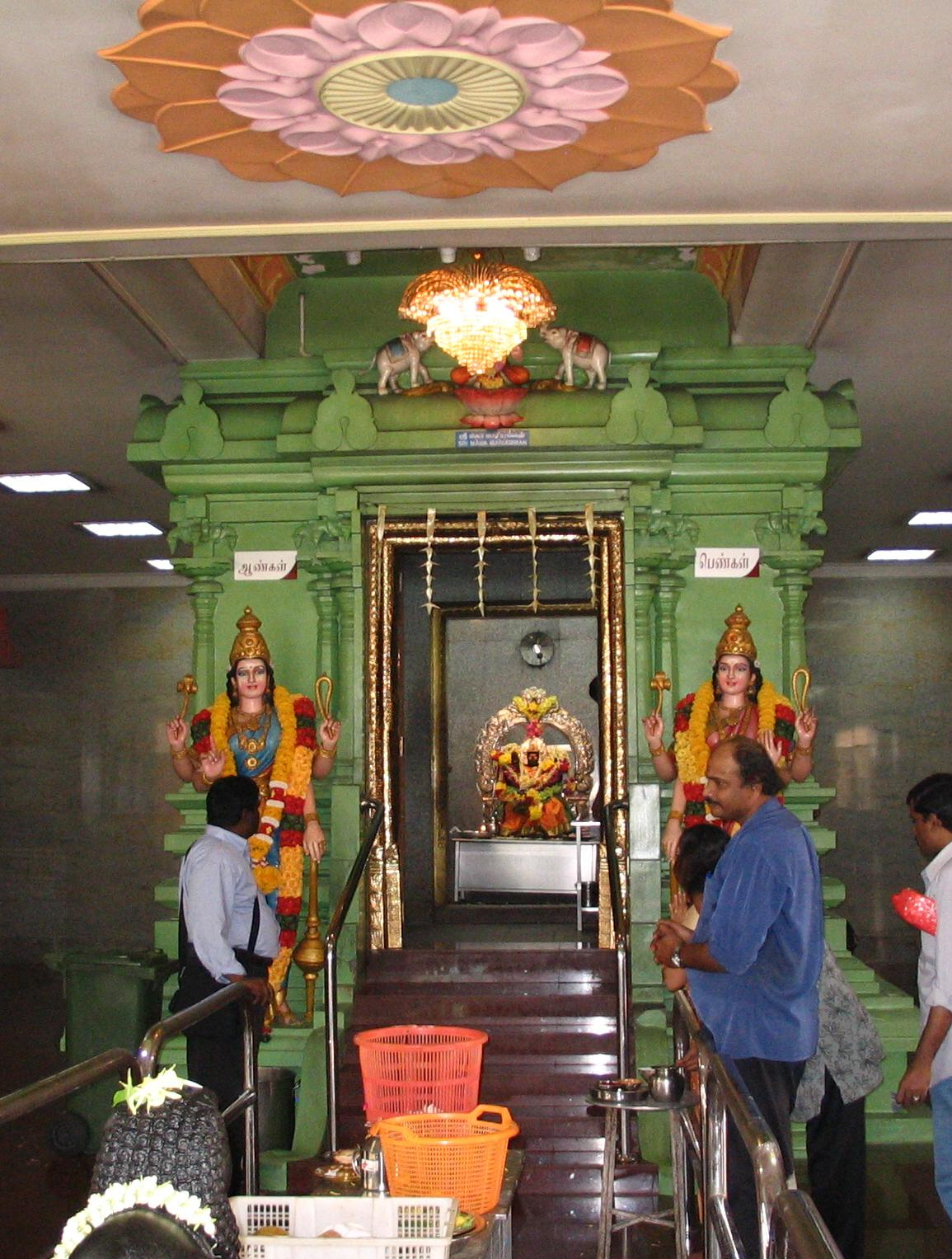
Main shrine to Mariamman in the Sri Maha Mariamman Temple in Kuala Lumpur, Malaysia

Sri Maha Mariamman Devasthanam temple in Shah Alam i-City, Malaysia

== See also ==
- Karuppuswamy
- Draupadi Amman
- Karumariamman
- Samayapuram Mariamman
- Isakki
- Kateri Amman
- Madurai Veeran
- Maisamma
- Pidari
- Caribbean Shaktism

== General references ==
- Kolenda, Pauline. "Pox and the Terror of Childlessness: Images and Ideas of the Smallpox Goddess in a North Indian Village" in P. Kolenda, Caste, Cult and Hierarchy: Essays on the Culture of India. New Delhi: Folklore Institute, 1983. pp. 198–221.
- Rigopoulos, Antonio. The life and teachings of Sai Baba of Shirdi. Albany: State University of New York Press, 1993. ISBN 0-7914-1268-7. pp. 78, 80, 160, 224, 226, 250.
