= Sri Mariamman Temple, Valangaiman =

Hindu temple in India

Religion
- Affiliation: Hinduism
- District: Tiruvarur
- Deity: Lord Shiva,

Location
- Location: Valangaiman
- State: Tamil Nadu
- Country: India

Architecture
- Type: Dravidian architecture

Sri Mariamman Temple is situated at Valangaiman in Tiruvarur district of Tamil Nadu, India. It is found in Kumbakonam-Needamangalam road, at a distance of 9 km from Kumbakonam.

== Temple structure ==
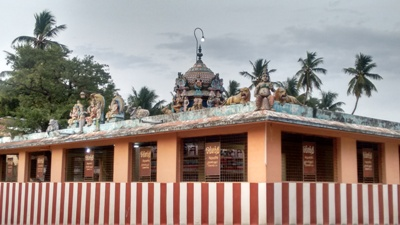
Temple

The temple has front mandapa, arthamandapa, sanctum sanctorum and prakara. In the mahamandapa, at the south Vinayaka and at the north Irulan, Pechiamman, Veeran with consorts are found. In the arthamandapa processional deities are kept. Sanctum sanctorum is in square size. In the south of the temple, temple tank is found.

== Presiding deity ==
The presiding deity is known as Valangaiman Mariamman.

== Pujas ==
Special pujas are held in this temple during the Tamil month of Aavani (August–September). Every Sunday is considered as festive day to this temple. This temple is opened from 6.00 a.m. to 12.00 noon and 5.00 p.m. to 8.00 p.m.

== Strange custom ==
Devotees follow a strange custom of fulfilling by doing ritual with paadai generally used for carrying the dead body.

== Mahasamprokshanam ==
The Mahasamprokshanam took place on 12 February 2020.
