= Samayapuram =

Human settlement in Tamil Nadu, India

Coordinates: 10°56′N 78°44′E

Samayapuram is a Neighborhood of Tiruchirappalli in Tamil Nadu, India, twelve kilometers north of the heart of the city, on the Trichy-Chennai highway. The Samayapuram Mariamman Temple, a prominent place of Hindu worship, is located here.

== Historical significance ==
The Mariamman temple of Samayapuram was the site of a fierce battle between a troop of the French East India Company and a troop of the British East India Company during the strife of Carnatic wars. A British troop led by Robert Clive defeated the French force, leading to the British company wresting possession of Samayapuram.
