= Mariamman Temple, Samayapuram =

Hindu temple in Tamil Nadu, India

Arulmigu Sri Mariamman Temple
- அருள்மிகு மாரியம்மன் திருக்கோயில்
- View of the entrance arch

- Mariamman Temple, Samayapuram, Tamil Nadu

Religion
- Affiliation: Hinduism
- District: Tiruchirappalli
- Deity: Samayapuram Mariamman
- Festivals: Chithirai Car Festival, Poo Choridal Festival, Vaikasi Panchaprakaram Festival and Thai Poosam Festival
- Governing body: Tamil Nadu Hindu Religious and Charitable Endowments Department

Location
- Location: Samayapuram
- State: Tamil Nadu
- Country: India
- Interactive map of Arulmigu Sri Mariamman Temple
- Coordinates: 10.9185°N 78.7389°E

Architecture
- Type: Tamil architecture

Specifications
- Temple: One
- Elevation: 115 m (377 ft)

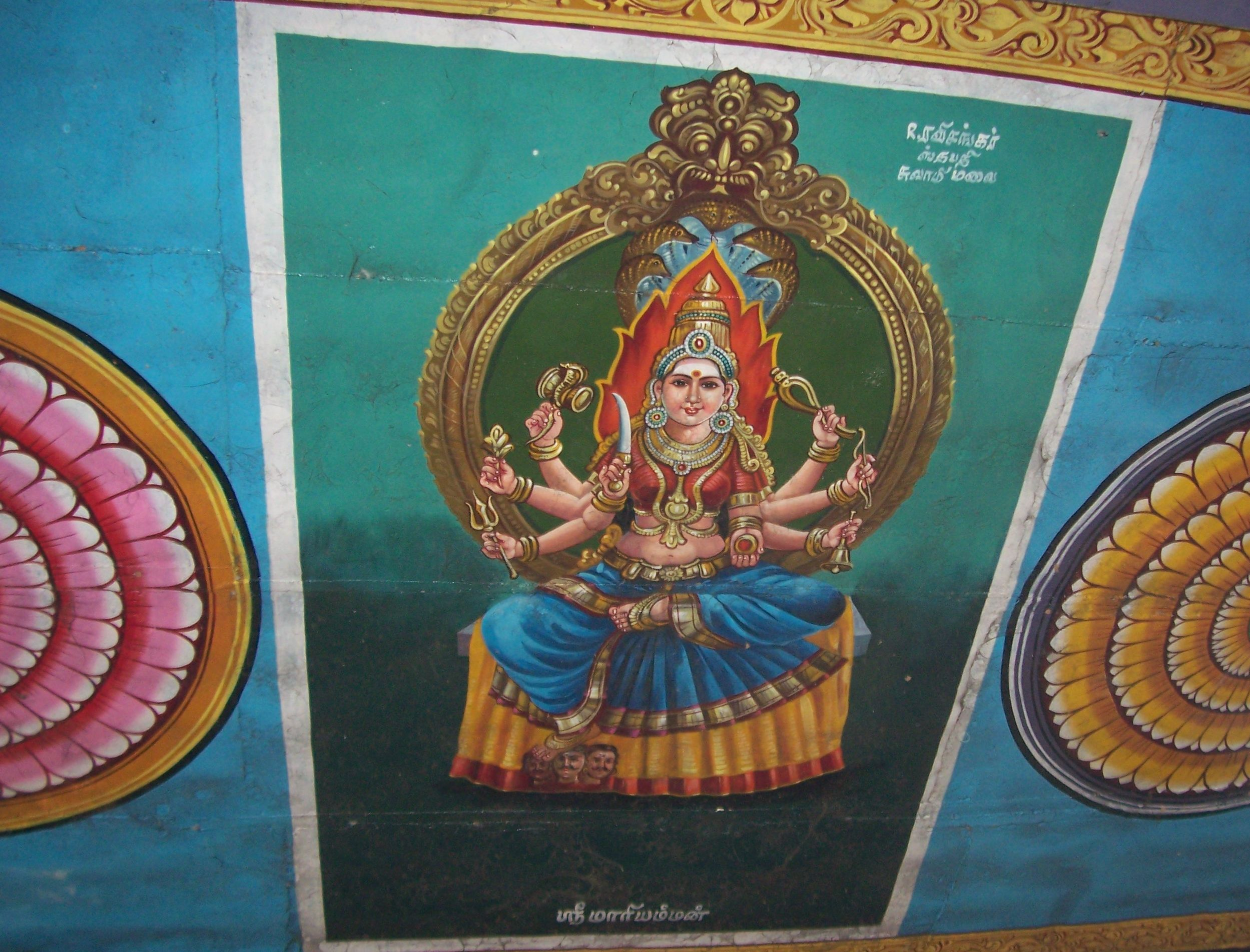
A painting of Mariamman on the ceiling of the entrance hall.

Arulmigu Sri Mariamman Temple, Samayapuram is an ancient Hindu temple in Tiruchirappalli district in Tamil Nadu, India. The main deity, Samayapuram Mariamman, a form of Adi Parashakti and Mariamman, is made of sand and clay with extractions of medicinal herbs unlike many of the traditional stone idols and is considered as most powerful Goddess, and hence unlike many other Hindu deities there are no abhishekams (sacred bathing) conducted to the main deity, but instead the "abishekam" is done to the small stone statue in front of it.

Devotees also offer mavilakku (Tamil - மாவிளக்கு), a sweet dish made of jaggery, rice flour and ghee. Offerings of raw salt and neem leaves are also made to the Goddess by the rural devotees.

The temple attracts thousands of devotees on Sundays, Tuesdays and Fridays, the holy days for Mariamman. Samayapuram is the second most wealthy (in terms of cash flows) temple in Tamil Nadu after Palani.

== History ==
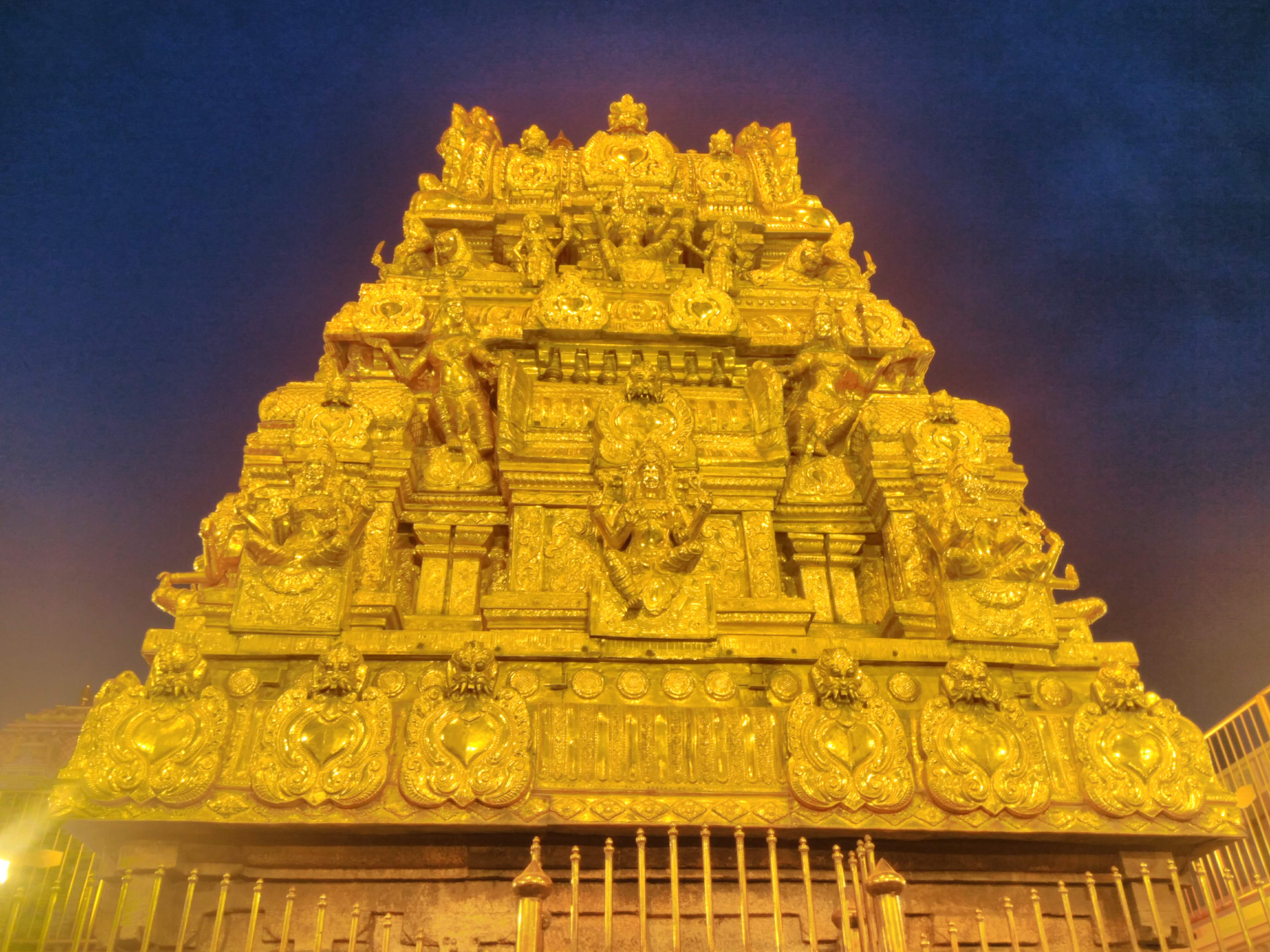
Gold-plated vimana over the sanctum.

The history of the temple is unclear. In the early 18th century, King Vijayaraya Chakravarti II built the present day form of the temple. There is scant history of the period before that though it is believed that the locals worshipped the Goddess for many centuries before building the current temple. One legend says that the present deity was at the Sri Ranganathaswamy Temple at Srirangam, and one of the chief priests of the temple believed that the idol caused illness to Ranganathar and hence asked it to be removed from the temple. It is a common belief in that part of the region that such local deities have immense powers and they must always be satisfied by proper offerings and sacrifices, otherwise, they cause epidemics. The idol was moved outside Srirangam and later found by some of the passersby who built a temple named, the Kannanur Mariamman Temple.

During that period (around the 17th century CE), Tiruchirapalli was ruled by the Vijayanagara Empire kings and the area was used as an army base. It is believed that they made a commitment to build the temple if they win the war and after attaining success, they built a shrine for the Goddess.The Mariamman Urchavar idol was donated in the year 1991 by G.Balamurugan & G.Muralikumar, grand children of M.Venkatachala Padayachi & V.Valliammal & children of V.Gunasekaran & G.Kokila of No.1, Old Post Office Street, Ulundurpet, South Arcot Dist

== Architecture ==
The new utsava murti idol, made out of panchaloha, was donated to the temple in the year 1991.

The temple is maintained and administered by the Hindu Religious and Charitable Endowments Department of the Government of Tamil Nadu.

== Festivals ==
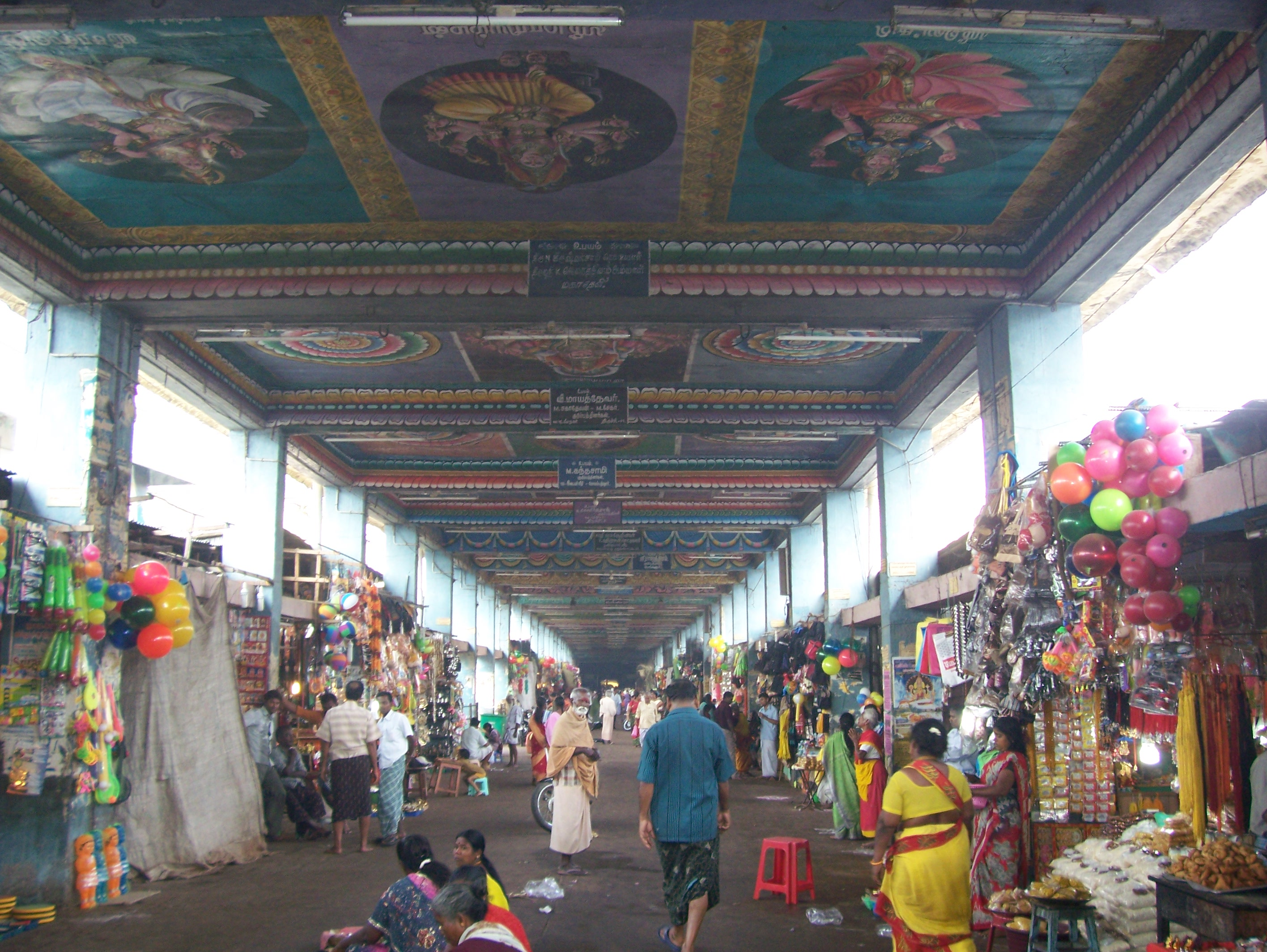
Entrance corridor, lined with shops

Thai Poosam usually occurs in the Tamil month of Thai. Like at most Tamil temples, the main festival happens before summer, generally in April, including the temple chariot and lake processions (teppams).

== Significance of the temple ==
Samayapuram is a significant symbol of the native culture in rural Tamil Nadu and there a number of unique practices concerning the Mariamman temples. Samayapuram has been used a model to describe rural folklore in a number of research works on sociology and religion.

During festivals, it is not unusual to find people doing extreme things to make their bodies suffer as an act of sacrifice including, walking over a red-hot bed of charcoal and holding hot mud-vessel in bare hands. Mariamman temples also typically involve Samiyattam wherein through a devotee (usually a female), Goddess Mariamman chooses to talk to help and bless the gathered devotees. The personality of the Goddess as well as the tremendous strain put on the body by the channelling (both physically and emotionally), may be interpreted by non-believers as hysteria or hyper-excitement.

== Heritage of Mariamman outside India ==
The legacy of Mariamman is well spread beyond Tamil Nadu and even after centuries of emigrating from India, many people in Sri Lanka, Malaysia, Singapore, South Africa and Fiji still maintain their loyalties to the temple and try to create similar shrines in their new country, raising both a cause of concern and an appreciation of diversity. There are many shrines to Mariamman in Malaysia and Singapore.
