= Isakki =

Hindu folk goddess

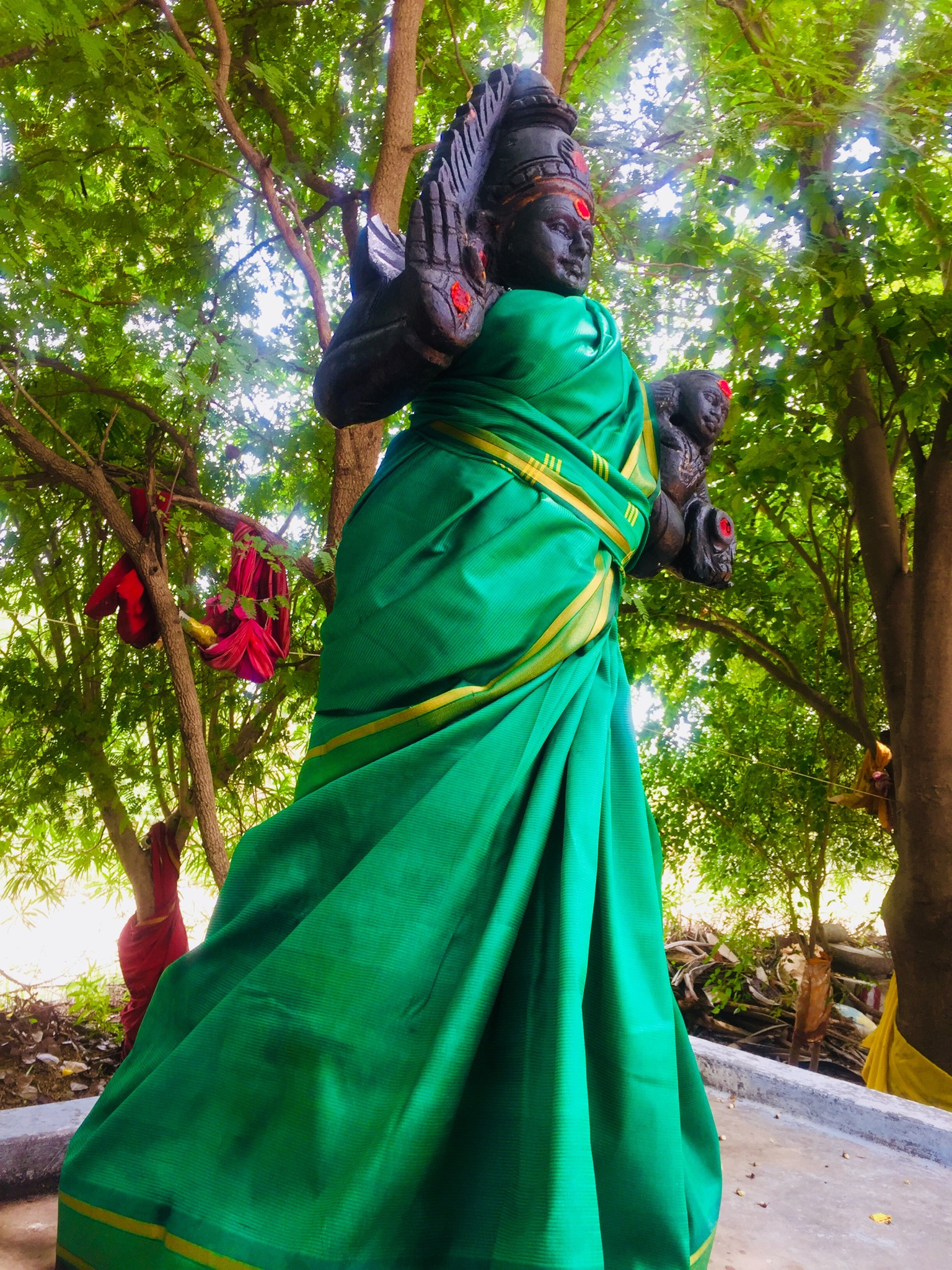
- Statue of Isakki
- Affiliation: Yakshi
- Region: Tamil Nadu

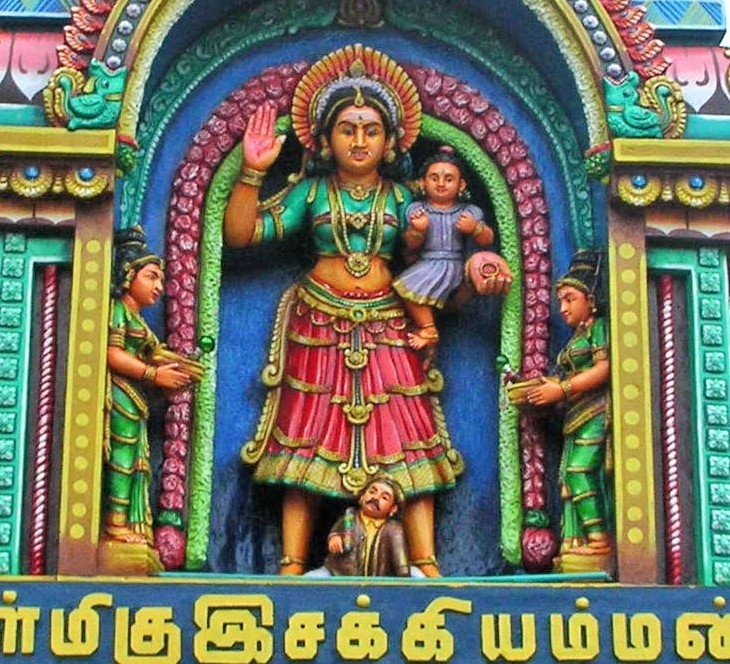
Goddess Isakki as portrayed on the gate of a small shrine near Shenkottai, Tamil Nadu

Isakki (Tamil: இசக்கி), also called Isakki Amman, Esakki, Esakki Amman is a folk Hindu goddess. The term Isakki derived from the Sanskrit yakshi, through the Prakrit yakki. Her veneration remains popular among certain Hindu communities in the southern Indian districts of Tamil Nadu, specifically the Arulmigu Isakki Amman Temple in Kulasekaranputhoor Kanyakumari, Tirunelveli, and Salem districts. She is generally considered to be one of the 'village deities' (kaval deivam). Village deities like her are believed to act as guardian spirits.

== Iconography ==
Isakki is usually portrayed as a young woman wearing a red dress. She is usually represented by holding a child in one hand and a trident in the other. She is also sometimes represented as standing above a man who lies on the ground. Isakki corresponds to the Jain Yakshini Ambika, who is always represented together with one or two children under a tree.

== Legend ==
The most common legend associated with Isakki is as follows: Ambika, a housewife, was leading a peaceful family life with her husband Somasharman and their two sons. One day, the tarpanam ritual had to be performed for the ancestors of their family, and all the items were duly prepared. However, while Somasharman was away to bathe in the river, Ambika offered food to a starving sage, who begged for it. Somasharman became enraged that the food for the ritual offering had been served to the sage before the necessary rites and pujas, and he chased Ambika and her children away from home. Ambika wandered until she found a calm place to rest. Realising his foolishness later, Somasharman went in to search his wife and children, but fearing him, Ambika gave up her life. After her unfortunate death, it is believed that she took the form of a yakshini, although she still wanted to take care of her growing children. Later, she was able to regain her life for the benefit of her offspring. In doing so, Ambika became the goddess Isakki.

== Shrines ==
Unlike the temples of the Vedic deities, temples dedicated to Isakki are usually humble shrines, decorated with a cactus-like plant known as paalkalli in Tamil. When it is damaged, these cacti ooze a milk-like sap which is considered to be a sign of the goddess Isakki.

Isakki temples usually have a Banyan or a bo tree located close to the shrine. Women who wish to have children often place small wooden cribs and/or tie pieces of their saris to the branches or the visible roots of the tree as an offering.

== Festivals ==
Isakki Amman is associated with popular festivals that involve cooking food at the shrine and the dedication of large terracotta figures of the goddess (3 to 4 ft in height) painted in bright colors. During the festival, the deities are anointed with water, coconut milk, rosewater, honey or oil twice a day. These figures are sometimes smeared with a liquid made from mixing lime, water, and turmeric (which ritually represents blood). The goddess is then offered rice, cake, fruit, milk while the presiding priest chants prayers. At the end of the ceremony and festival, the food is removed from the shrine.

== See also ==
- Karuppuswamy
- Wish Tree
