= Hinduism in Trinidad and Tobago =

Trinidadian and Tobagonian Hindus

Total population
- 240,100 (2011); 18.15% of the population (2011 census) ▲24.33% of the population (2025 est.)

Regions with significant populations
- Trinidad and Tobago · United States · Canada · United Kingdom

Religions
- Hinduism (Sanātana Dharma); Majority sect Sanātanī; Minority sects Arya Samaj · Kabir Panth · Caribbean Shaktism (Kali Mai Dharam/Madrasi Hinduism) · Sathya Sai Baba movement · Sieunarini (Shiv Narayani) Panth/Shiva Dharam · Hindu atheism · others

Scriptures
- Vedas · Puranas · Upanishads · Ramayana (incl. Ramcharitmanas retelling) · Mahabharata (incl. Bhagavad Gita) · other Hindu texts

Languages
- Sanskrit · Tamil (liturgical languages); Trinidadian and Tobagonian English · Trinidadian Hindustani · Hinglish · other Indian Languages

Related ethnic groups
- Guyanese Hindus · Surinamese Hindus · Jamaican Hindus · other Caribbean Hindus

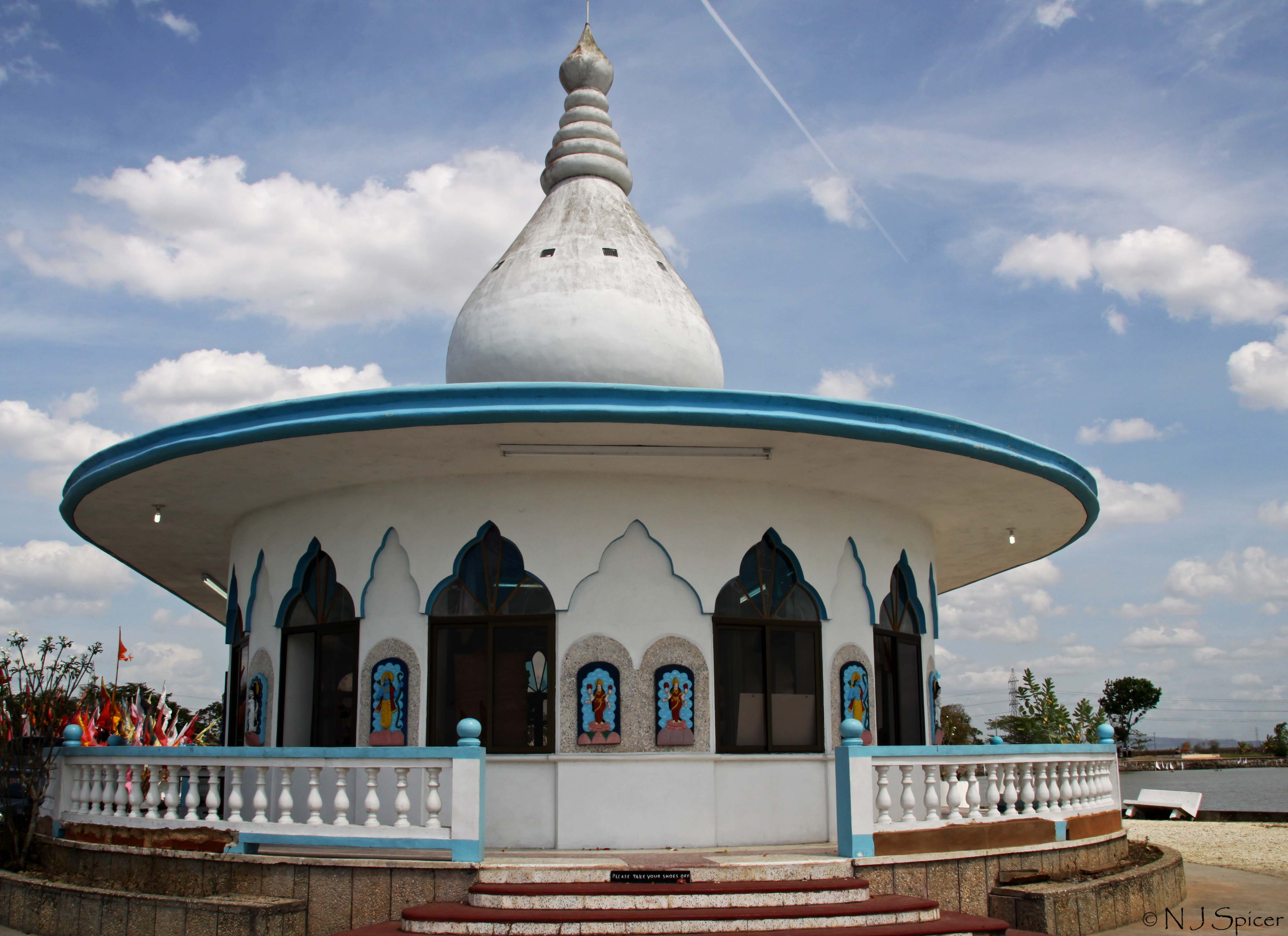
Temple in the Sea

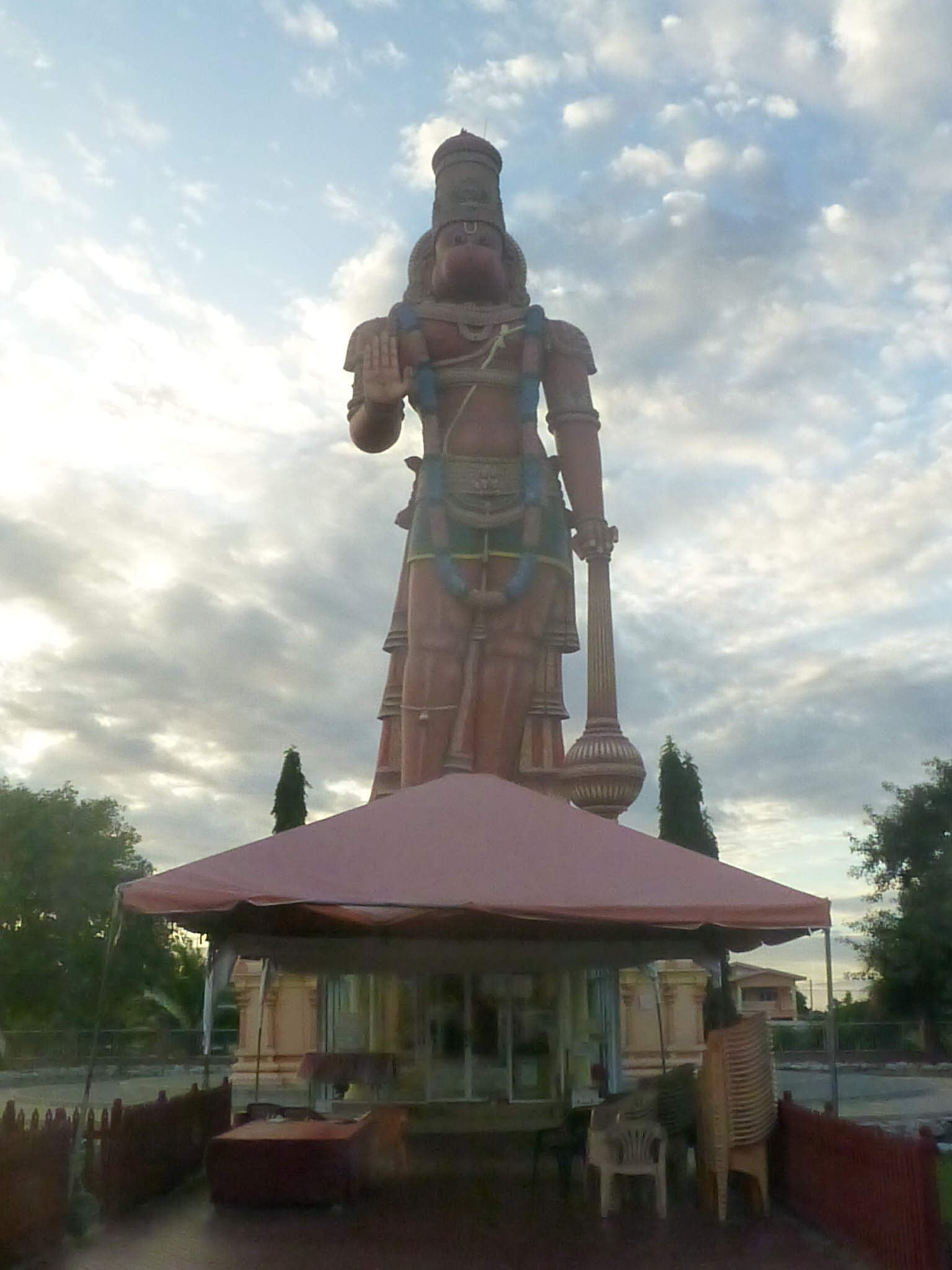
Karyasiddhi Hanuman statue at the Dattatreya Mandir in Orange Field Village, Carapichaima, Caroni County, Couva–Tabaquite–Talparo, Trinidad and Tobago

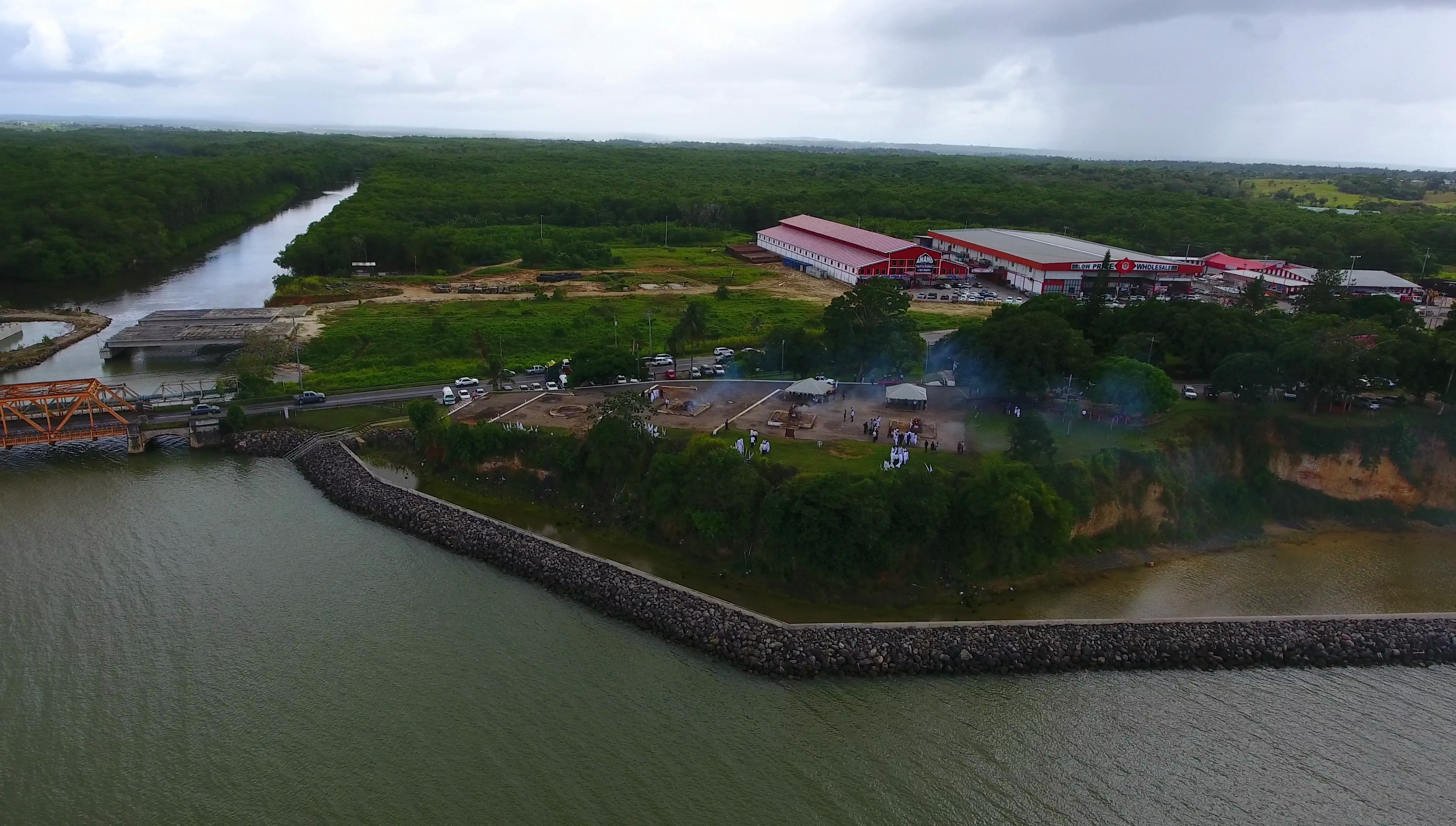
Mosquito Creek Cremation Ground (South Oropouche)

Hinduism in Trinidad and Tobago is the second largest religion. Hindu culture arrived to Trinidad and Tobago in 1845, with the arrival of the first Indian indentured laborers, the overwhelming majority of which were Hindu. According to the 2011 census there were 240,100 declared Hindus in Trinidad and Tobago.

== History ==
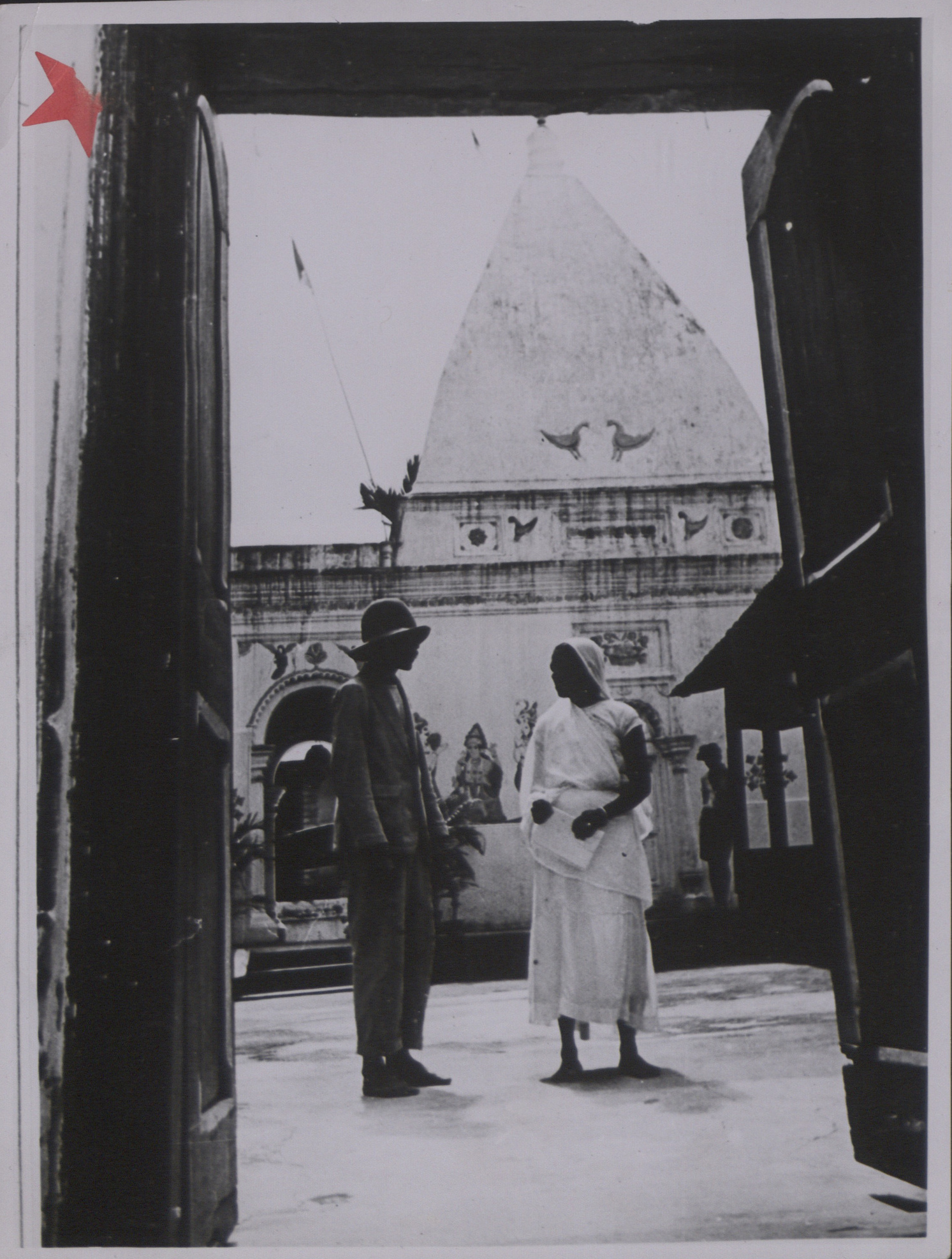
Mandir near Port of Spain, 1945

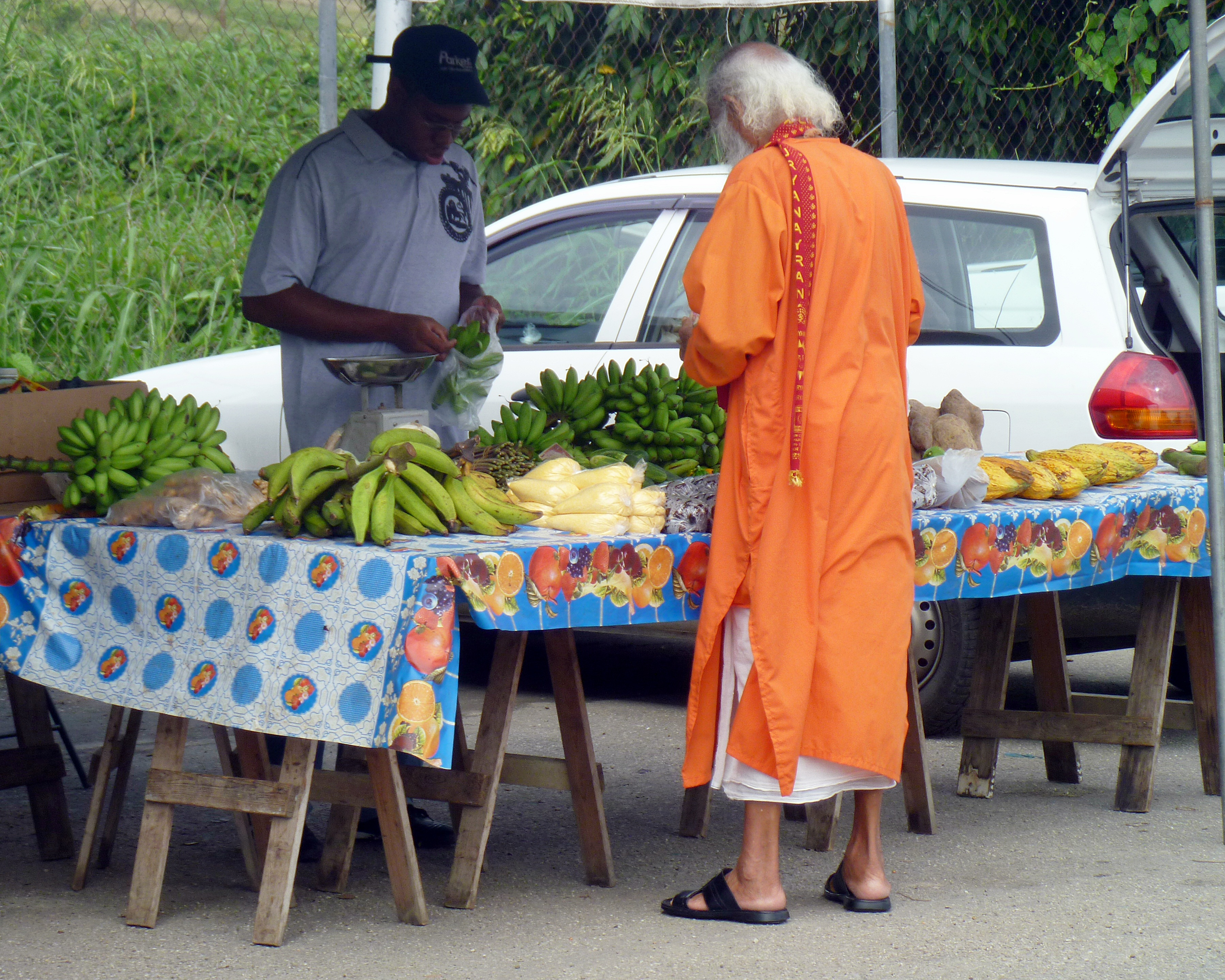
A sadhu at Debe Market

A decade after slavery was abolished in 1834, the British government gave permission for the colonists to import indentured labor from India to work on the estates. Throughout the remainder of the century, Trinidad's population growth came primarily from Indian laborers. By 1871, there were 27,425 Indians, approximately 22 percent of the population of Trinidad and Tobago; by 1911 that figure had grown to 110,911, or about 33 percent of all residents of the islands.

During the initial decades of Indian indenture, Indian cultural forms were met with either contempt or indifference by the non-Hindu majority. Hindus have made many contributions to Trinidad history and culture even though the state historically regarded Hindus as second class citizens. Hindus in Trinidad struggled over the granting of adult franchise, the Hindu marriage bill, the divorce bill, cremation ordinance, and others. Cremation was allowed in 1953.

There has been persistent discontent among the Hindus with their marginalization. Many groups portray Hindus as "clannish, backward and miserly". During the General Elections of 1986, the absence of the Bhagvad Gita and the Quran at polling stations for required oath-taking was interpreted as a gross insult to Hindus and Muslims. The absence of any Hindu religious texts at the official residence of the President of Trinidad and Tobago during the swearing in of the new Government in 1986 was perceived as another insult to the minority communities since they were represented in the government. The national education system and curriculum have been repeatedly accused of such majority-oriented symbolism. The use of discernibly oriented prayers at Government schools, the non-representation of Hinduism in approved school textbooks, and the lack of emphasis on Hindu religious observance evoked deep resentment from the Hindu community. Intensified protests over the course of the 1980s led to an improvement in the state's attitudes towards Hindus.

The divergence of some of the fundamental aspects of local Hindu culture, the segregation of the Hindu community from Trinidad, and the disinclination to risk erasing the more fundamental aspects of what had been constructed as "Trinidad Hinduism" in which the identity of the group had been rooted, would often generate dissension when certain dimensions of Hindu culture came into contact with the State. While the incongruousness continue to generate debate, and often conflict, it is now tempered with growing awareness and consideration on the part of the state to the Hindu minority. Hindus have also been subjected to conversions by Christian missionaries, specifically the evangelical and Pentecostal Christians. Such activities reflect racial tensions that at times arise between the Afro-Trinidadian and Indo-Trinidadian communities.

== Demographics ==
Historical population
Year	Pop.	±%
1990	292,786	—
2000	285,517	−2.5%
2011	240,100	−15.9%

Year	Percent	Decrease
1962	23.8%	-
2000	22.5%	-1.03%
2011	18.15%	-4.35%
2025 (est.)	24.33%	+6.20%

As per the 2011 Census, there were 240,100 Hindus in Trinidad and Tobago. Out of this, 232,104 were Indian, 2,738 were Dougla (mixed African/Indian), 2,466 were Mixed/Other, 1,887 Unknown ethnicity, 346 African, 175 Chinese, 27 European, 302 Indigenous Amerindian, 46 Other, and 8 Portuguese. Talking about the proportion within the ethnic groups, 49.54% of the East Indians and 21.66% of the Indigenous were Hindu. So were 4.37% of the Chinese, 2.70% of Douglas (mixed African/East Indian), 1.23% of the Mixed/Other and 0.08% of the Africans.

Hindu population according to the administrative division is as follows: Port of Spain- 1.45%, San Fernando- 10.70%, Arima- 4.39%, Chaguanas- 30.04%, Point Fortin- 3.87%, Couva- 31.26%, Diego Martin- 1.83%, Mayaro- 22.46%, Penal- 42.98%, Princes Town- 26.99%, San Juan- 8.35%, Sangre Grande- 15.41%, Siparia-23.37%, Tunapuna- 14.07%, and Tobago- 0.67%.

== Sects, denominations, and organizations ==
- Sanātanī, the orthodox sect being the largest and most dominant Hindu sect in Trinidad and Tobago, with notable influence from Ramanandi Vaishnavism, Shaivism (Daśanāmi Sampradaya (Gosines)/Natha Sampradaya/Aghoras), Smartism, Shaktism, Sauraism, Vedanta (incl. Vishishtadvaita), and other Hindu traditions
  - Sanatan Dharma Maha Sabha, the major Sanātanī group in Trinidad and Tobago
  - SWAHA International, a smaller Sanātanī group
- Arya Samaj
  - Arya Pratinidhi Sabha
  - Vedic Mission
- Kabir Panth
- Seunariani (Sieunarini/Siewnaraini/Shiv Narayani)
  - Shiva Dharam Sabha, formerly known as the Seunarine Dharam Sabha
- Aughar (Aghor/Owghur)
- Ravidas Panth
- Kali Mai (Madrasi)
- Murugan (Kaumaram)
- Chinmaya Mission
- Bharat Sevashram Sangha
- Sathya Sai Baba movement/Sathya Sai Organization
- Shirdi Sai Baba movement
- Jagadguru Kripalu Parishat (Radha Madhav)
- ISKCON
- Ganapathi Sachchidananda movement
- Divine Life Society
- Brahma Kumaris
- Blue Star

== Culture ==
The North Indian customs from Uttar Pradesh and Bihar remained influential where ceremonies like Tilak, Matkora, Hardi, Kangan Bandhan, Saptapadi, Sindurdan and Laja-homa adapting to caribbean conditions.

=== Hindu organisations and holidays ===
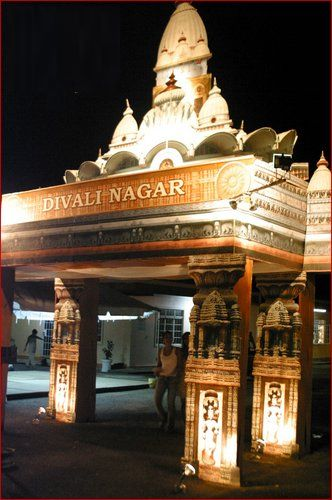
Divali Nagar in Chaguanas, Trinidad and Tobago.

The major Hindu organisation in Trinidad and Tobago is the Sanatan Dharma Maha Sabha founded by Bhadase Sagan Maraj, and formerly led by his son-in-law Secretary General Satnarayan Maharaj, is led by his grandson, Secretary General Vijay Maharaj. The Hindu festival of Diwali is a public holiday in Trinidad and Tobago, and along with Phagwah, it is widely celebrated in Trinidad and Tobago by people of all races, ethnicities, cultures, and religions. Other Hindu festivals such as: Ram Navami, Sita Navami, Vivaha Panchami, Maha Shivaratri, Navaratri, Chhath Puja, Krishna Janmaashtami, Radhastami, Dussehra, Kartik Purnima, Guru Purnima, Karagam Puja, Tulsi Vivah, Makar Sankranti, Ratha Saptami, Ahoi Ashtami, Pitru Paksha, Hanuman Jayanti, Ganesh Chaturthi, Raksha Bandhan, Gandhi Jayanti, Vasant Panchami, are also celebrated.

The Gangadhaara festival uses the Marianne river as a symbolic pilgrimage route to honor the sacred Ganga river and enact the experiences of indentured labourers who travelled the black waters (Kala pani) to reach Trinidad as sanctioned by God.

=== Caste ===
Many indentured labourers taken from British India came from marginalised and lower-caste backgrounds, including a significant number from the Chamar caste. Facing entrenched discrimination, poverty, and limited opportunities in India, they were often drawn by misleading promises of better livelihoods abroad. As a result, they formed an important yet frequently overlooked segment of the indentured workforce in Trinidad and Tobago.

As in other parts of the Caribbean, South Africa, Fiji, and Mauritius, caste distinctions are all but forgotten among Trinidadian Hindus. Caste restrictions in Trinidad weakened. Considerations of caste became less important in choosing a spouse largely because there were so few women among the Indian indentured workers.

=== Impact of Girmit System on Caste Dynamics ===
Although the Girmit system subjected all labourers, regardless of caste, to harsh and exploitative conditions, migration nonetheless offered many Chamars and other oppressed groups an opportunity to escape rigid caste hierarchies. Over time, they established new communities across the globe, reshaping social identities and forging resilience in diaspora.

=== Cremation ===
Cremation is permitted at five cremation sites in Mafeking (Mayaro-Rio Claro), South Oropouche (Siparia), Waterloo (Couva-Tabaquite-Talparo), Felicity (Chaguanas) and Caroni (Tunapuna-Piarco).

== See also ==
- Indo-Caribbean
- List of Hindu temples in Trinidad and Tobago
- Indo-Trinidadian and Tobagonian
- Hinduism in Suriname
- Hinduism in Guyana
- Hinduism in the West Indies
- Caribbean Shaktism
