= Hinduism in Guyana =

Guyanese Hindus

Total population
- 185,000 (2012) ▼24.8% of the population

Regions with significant populations
- Guyana; United States; Canada; United Kingdom; Netherlands; Suriname; Trinidad and Tobago; St. Martin

Religions
- Hinduism (Sanātana Dharma); Majority sect Sanātanī; Minority sects Arya Samaj · Caribbean Shaktism (Kali Mai Dharam/Madrasi Hinduism) · Sathya Sai Baba movement · Sieunarini (Sir Narain/Shiv Narayani) Panth · Hindu atheism · others

Scriptures
- Vedas · Puranas · Upanishads · Ramayana (incl. Ramcharitmanas retelling) · Mahabharata (incl. Bhagavad Gita) · other Hindu texts

Languages
- Sanskrit · Tamil (liturgical languages); English (Guyanese English Creole) · Guyanese Hindustani

Related ethnic groups
- Trinidadian and Tobagonian Hindus · Surinamese Hindus · Jamaican Hindus · other Caribbean Hindus

Hinduism in Guyana is the religion of about 31.0% of the population in 2021. This makes Guyana the country with the highest percentage of Hindu residents in the Western Hemisphere.

== History ==
After the 1833 Slavery Abolition Act in the British Empire, the need for labour led to the recruitment of Indians in Guyana and other British West Indian territories. Upon arrival, the new workers had to adapt to the extreme tropical conditions, along with their new contracts and working conditions. Between 1835 and 1918, 341,600 indentured labourers were imported into British Guyana from India.

From 1852, Christian missionaries attempted to convert East Indians during the indentured servitude period, but this was met with little success. In response to Christian proselytizing, Hindu priests, called pandits, began administering spiritual rites to all Hindus. During this time, there was a lack of a central place to practice Hinduism. Thus, many Hindus would carry on tradition through, singing bhajans, and the retelling of scriptures, such as the Ramcharitmanas.

As Indians came to Guyana from many parts of India, many languages came with them. However, over time, this morphed in to a common dialect, known as Guyanese Creole, with many words from the Indian languages that influenced the common dialect. However, now, during Hindu practices, such as in mandirs, Sanskrit is often spoken during prayer.

In the late 1940s, reform movements caught the attention of many Guyanese Hindus. In 1910, Arya Samaj arrived in Guyana. Other notable Hindu groups in Guyana include the South Indian-rooted Kali followers, the Bramha Kumaris, and the followers of the Śiva Nārāyaṇa movement. The most widely followed form of Hindu worship, based on North Indian practices, is Sanathana Dharma.

== Demographics ==
Hinduism had been slowly decreasing for many decades. In 1991, 35.0% of the Guyanese population adhered to Hinduism, decreasing to 28.4% in 2002, 24.8% in 2012.

Year	Percent	Decrease
1980	37.1%	-
1991	35.0%	-2.1%
2002	28.4%	-6.6%
2012	24.8%	-3.6%

=== Geographical distribution of Hindus ===
Region	Percent of Hindus (2002)	Percent of Hindus (2012)
Barima-Waini	8.1%	0.4%
Pomeroon-Supenaam	37.3%	33.2%
Essequibo Islands-West Demerara	46.5%	37.7%
Demerara-Mahaica	24.4%	20.8%
Mahaica-Berbice	39.0%	34.1%
East Berbice-Corentyne	46.4%	42.1%
Cuyuni-Mazaruni	5.6%	3.5%
Potaro-Siparuni	6.4%	1.0%
Upper Takutu-Upper Essequibo	0.5%	0.4%
Upper Demerara-Berbice	4.7%	0.8%
Guyana	28.4%	24.8%

Tamil (Madrasi) Hindus forms the majority in East Berbice-Corentyne region and practice Caribbean Shaktism.

According to the 2012 census, 39.8% of the Guyana's population is of East Indian origin and 24.8% are Hindus. The remainder is mostly Muslim (6.8%) or Christian (62.7%). according to new census The Hindu population in Guyana has been steadily increasing over the years. According to the 2012 Census, Hindus constitute approximately 24% of the total population, showing growth in both absolute numbers and as a percentage of the population. However, there are concerns regarding Christian proselytization among Hindus and the overall decline in the Hindu population.

== Public Holidays ==
Holi-Phagwah and Deepavali are National Holidays in Guyana. Other notable holidays include Maha Shivaratri, where all-night worship is common to the Lord Shiva, and Ramnavmi, the worship to Lord Rama.

== Practices ==
A common practice by Hindus in Guyana includes puja done at the home or at temples. At the home, a jhandi (Hindu prayer flag), is often placed outside the home. Jhandi is also often used as the name for the puja done at the home. At the temples, puja often consists of prayer or mantra reading, scripture reading, the singing of bhajans with a kirtan group consisting of many instruments and singers, the completion of the ritual of worship to the fire called havan, the completion of arti, the giving of prasad, which is often fruits or other sweets, and more.

== Temples ==
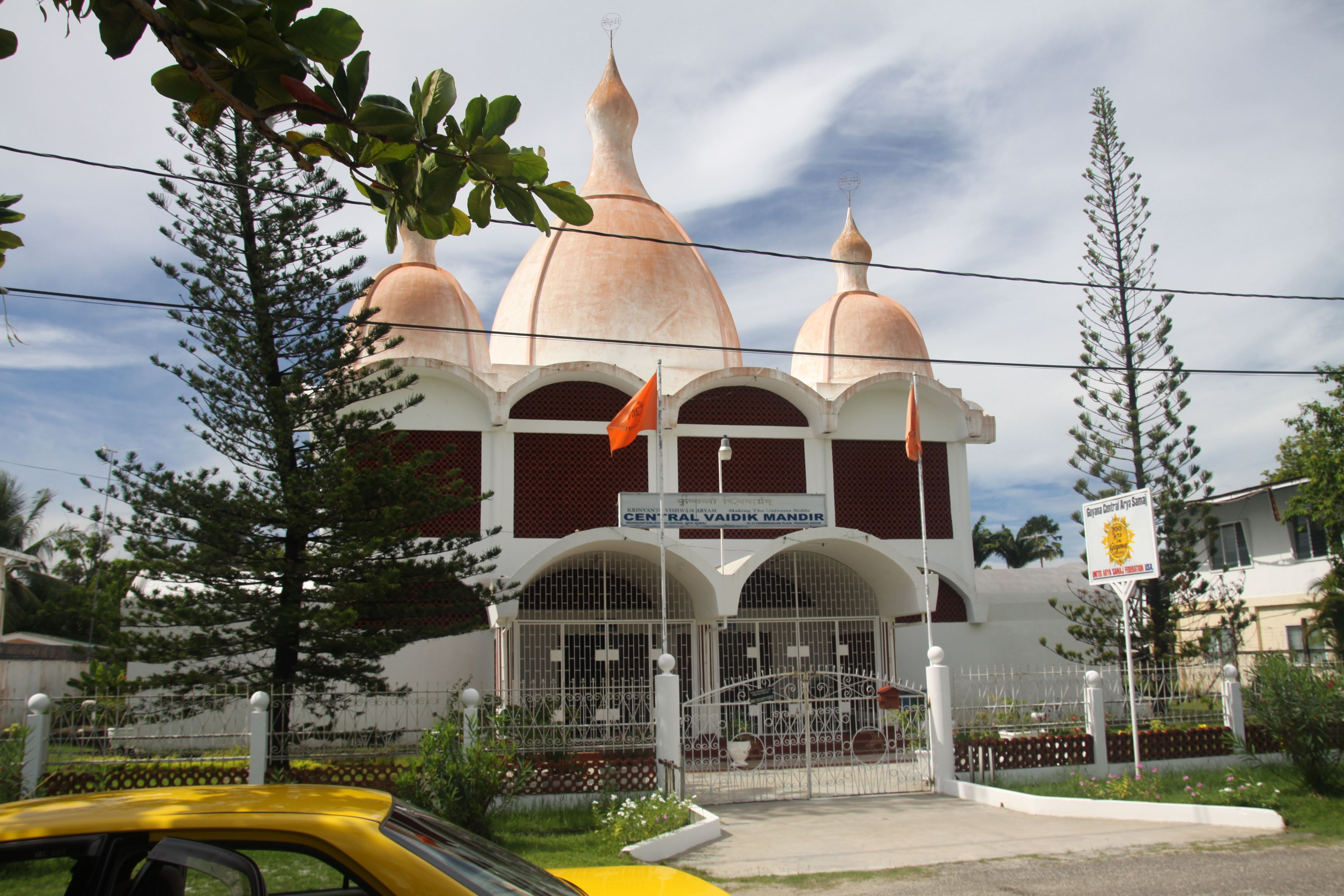

Temples or mandirs are the main place of worship for Hindus in Guyana. These were built around twenty to thirty years after Indian arrival.

- Tain Hindu Mandir
- Central Vaidik Mandir
- Sita Ram Toolsie Vade Ganesh Mandir
- Shree Maha Kali Devi Temple
- Edinburgh Shree Krishna Mandir
- Hampton Court Mandir
- D'Edward Vighneshwar Mandir
- Ogle Sanathan Dharma Sabha (pictured below)

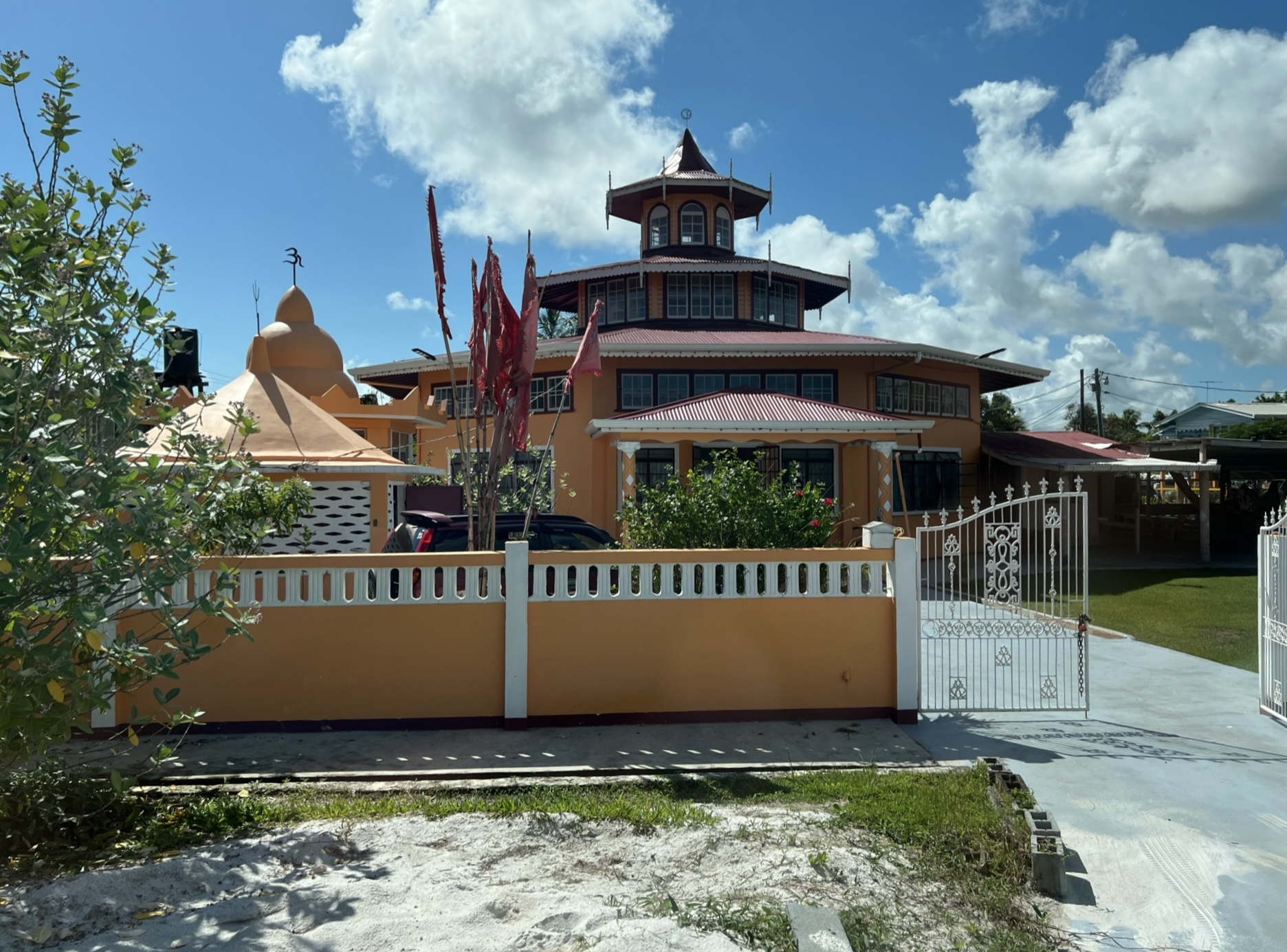

== See also ==
- Religion in Guyana
- Hinduism in Belize
- Hinduism in French Guiana
- Hinduism in South America
- Hinduism in Suriname
- Hinduism in Trinidad and Tobago
- Hindu eschatology
