= Caribbean Shaktism =

Syncretic religion

Caribbean Shaktism, also known as Kalimai Dharam, or Madrasi Hinduism, refers to the syncretic Shakta Hindu Kali/Mariamman worship that has evolved within the Indo-Caribbean Tamil community in countries such as Guyana, Trinidad and Tobago, Suriname, Guadeloupe, Martinique, and other Caribbean countries. It can be found across the Caribbean and any South American country with an Indo-Caribbean community. It is a syncretic blend of the Dravidian folk religion, the South Indian Kaula Srikula tradition that is of the Vamachara path, the Bengali, Maithili, and Bhojpuri folk Hindu Kalikula tradition, Shaivism, and Kaumaram, with communities in Martinique and Guadeloupe incorporating elements from the veneration of Mary in Catholicism.

Similar traditions to this (which also have its origins in Tamil Mariamman Worship) can be found in the Tamil populations of South Africa, Mauritius, Malaysia, Singapore, Fiji and Vietnam.

== History ==
Indo-Caribbean Shaktism has emerged within the Indo-Caribbean community residing in countries such as Trinidad and Tobago, Guyana, and others in the Caribbean region.

=== Origins in India ===
Indo-Caribbean Shaktism is a syncretic tradition that has its origins in the Mariamman following in Tamil Nadu. Mariamman was syncretized with Kali while also keeping the individual identity of Mariamman as a manifestation of Kali who is perceived to be the embodiment of Shakti in this tradition. Along this, deities from both Dravidian folk religion and Hinduism were worshipped, some perceived as a manifestation of another God while others were syncretized. Village deities of South India and the gramadevata, Dih Babas, of villages in the Bhojpur-Purvanchal and Awadh regions were also syncretized and Sangili Karuppannaswamy became known in the Caribbean simply as Dee Baba and Sangani Baba and was seen as an avatar of Bhairava and Shiva.

=== Arrival to the Caribbean and South America ===
Indo-Caribbean Shaktism emerged as a result of the migration of the Tamil Indians to the Caribbean during the 19th century. The British colonial policies led to the introduction of indentured servitude, bringing Indians from various regions to work on plantations in places like Guyana, Trinidad and Tobago, and Jamaica, Martinique, Suriname, French Guiana and with that, the indentured servants carried their religious traditions with them, including their beliefs in the Tamil Goddess Mariamman.

The migration of Indians as indentured servants introduced new religious and social dynamics to the British colonies in the Caribbean and South America. These migrants came from oppressed castes and lower socioeconomic backgrounds, creating a distinct class of people who were neither Black nor White.

=== Double diaspora in the United States ===
Indo-Caribbean communities have also established temples in countries like the United States. These communities experience a "double diaspora," connecting their traditions to both India and their respective Caribbean or South American countries.

== Beliefs and practices ==
Indo-Caribbean Shaktism is primarily Kalikula, meaning that the primary deity worshipped is Kali.

=== Beliefs ===
Indo-Caribbean Shaktism combines their Shakti beliefs of Tamil origin with cultural influences from the Caribbean context. Devotees engage in rituals and practices like puja, mantra recitation, and devotional singing to connect with Shakti. Other Hindu deities may appear in temples and iconography alongside Kali and Tamil Gods/Goddesses, including Durga, Ganesh, Hanuman, Krishna, Lakshmi, Radha, Murugan, Rama, Saraswati, Shiva, and Sita. These Gods of Vedic origin are worshipped alongside those of Tamil (Madras) origin. Murugan has a special following in some Caribbean Shakti communities, especially those in the French Caribbean, where he is seen as the embodiment of Ardhanarishvara in its fullest potent. His following stems from Tamil religion.

Indo-Caribbean Shaktism, like most Hindu sects and regional variations, is described differently by different individuals, with some considering it pantheistic, polytheistic, or even monotheistic. Shaktas view the goddess (Kali/Mariamma) as the supreme, ultimate, and eternal reality, embodying creation and its governing energy.

=== Practices and syncretism ===
Indo-Caribbean Shaktism encompasses various religious practices that have evolved among the Indo-Caribbean community, influenced by Hindu traditions, and Dravidian folk religion. Due to adaptations to the Caribbean region, some practices differ from those found in the Indian Subcontinent (most of all in Tamil Nadu). Common practices include animal sacrifice (now contentious and abandoned by some groups), physical manifestation of deities, libations, firewalking, rites, drumming, and singing devotional songs (bhajans) to invoke the presence of God. Hindu practices like deity meditation, pujas, and religious ceremonies are also observed, along with unique elements from Dravidian Folk Religion such as physical manifestations during rituals.

Ceremonies called Pujas often include the drumming of three to five tappu to invoke the deity to the space. Then, the head pujari receives the God or Goddess into their body, acting as a medium. A mixture of water, turmeric powder, and neem leaves are poured onto the medium, as it is believed that the God's energy heats up the body while the water and turmeric with the neem leaves cools the body down again. Puja services are often held once a week and the medium is known as a marlo pujari, who goes into a trance known as "Sami Aduthal". Practitioners use offerings of vegetarian (sadaa) and non-vegetarian (satwik) origin. Often, animals can be sacrificed to the "warrior" or "Madras" Gods, which are gods of Tamil origin, and often are black roosters, pigs, goats, and hens.

== Regional variations ==
Since Caribbean Shaktism encompasses a wide range of similar traditions from across the Caribbean and South America, there are some regional variations which may differ from one another. It may be due to more or less influence of Tamil culture, or other aspects. The regions where the largest amount of Shakti practices can be found is in East Berbice-Corentyne, Guyana and Couva–Tabaquite–Talparo, Trinidad and Tobago with smaller communities of Madras Hindus in bordering areas of Suriname with Guyana, parts of French Guiana, Jamaica, Saint Lucia, Cayman Islands, Guadeloupe, Martinique, and in some parts of Venezuela and Central America where Tamil Antillean settlers brought their religion. (Most notably in Colon, Maracaibo, El Callao, The northern Caribbean coast of Nicaragua, and some parts of Caribbean Costa Rica and some parts of the Leeward Antilles).

=== Maldevidan Spiritism ===
Maldevidan Spiritism is a syncretic practice originating in the French Caribbean that has its origins in Caribbean Shaktism and Roman Catholicism. Practitioners worship Hindu gods represented as Catholic saints. They refer to these gods as "les bons dieux coolies" in French, meaning "The holy Coolie Gods", "Coolie" is a slang word for East Indian.

The primary deity is "Maldevidan", a local regional name for Madurai Veeran, who is syncretized with Jesus. Another deity, Mari-Eman (a local name for Mariamman) is also important in the practice, being syncretized with the Virgin Mary. Deities like Kateri Amman (syncretized with St. Michael), among others are also found in the tradition.

This practice is common in the northern regions of the island, with many shrines and gathering places throughout the region. Rituals include playing drums, dancing on sharpened machetes, and sacrificing animals such as roosters and sheep.

There is a historic Hindu temple in Basse-Pointe, in Martinique built in the 19th century, which is still in use.

=== Caribbean Tamil Christianity ===
Some syncretists in the French, Dutch, and English Caribbean may even be as syncretic where they do Caribbean Shakti practices while outwardly practicing Evangelicalism or Roman Catholicism, two of the most common Christian practices in the Caribbean. The traditions of spirit possession (Sami Aduthal) may have been syncretized with those of the Baptism with the Holy Spirit of the Evangelical Church and the traditions of appealing to different saints in the Catholic Church may have syncretized those of appealing to the different Hindu and Dravidian gods. Other less orthodox traditions may have also been kept to some extent, whether going to the fullest extent of keeping most or all traditions as long as aligning with those of Christianity, or may have kept them to a lesser extent, doing traditions of worshipping by a river or doing a three-day Karagam Puja, creating a sort of Caribbean-Shakti Christianity, or Caribbean Tamil Church, and also resulting in forms of Caribbean Shaktism more syncretic or less syncretic than others.

== Relation to mainland Indian Shaktism ==
There are many differences in Indo-Caribbean Shaktism that are different from the form of Shaktism practiced in Mainland India and Nepal. One such feature is that of syncretism, in which Catholic or New Age spiritual figures may often be found in Shakti Mandirs. There are also practices, such as that of Maldevidan Spiritism in Martinique, or Caribbean Tamil Christianity in the English Caribbean and Dutch Caribbean that is syncretic.

Guayanese practitioners who emigrated to New York City describe sonic practices of Madrasi religion as having ancient Tamil origins.

Another practice that is different is that of the deities worshipped. While Vedic Hindu deities are worshipped, deities referred to as "Madrasi" gods (meaning Dravidian or Tamil gods) come from Dravidian folk religion. Such gods are Sangani Baba, Mariamman, Kateri Maa, Muniswaran, among others. Different names may also be used for Vedic deities and some practices may be of regional origin rather than general origin. Some deities may even be new deities created by the indentured servants for a specific purpose.

Indo-Caribbean Shakti bhajans and Kirtans (devotional music) are often done in Tamil and Caribbean Hindustani rather than in Sanskrit (although Sanskrit bhajans are used) and practices such as Karagam Puja are not found in Indian Shaktism. Most devotees of Indo-Caribbean Shaktism also practice Hinduism, going to both services of Vedic origin and services of Madrasi origin.

== Temples ==
=== Guyana ===
- Supply Jagadamba Devi Temple, Triumph, Guyana
- Maha Kali Kovil, Guyana
- Shree Bhadra Kali Amman Ashram, Guyana
- Maha Kali Shakti Temple, Timehri, Guyana
- Kali Temple, Guyana
- Mariamman Temple, Whim, Berbice, Guyana

=== Trinidad and Tobago ===
- Arjune Davi Niraj Shakti Temple, Marabella, Trinidad and Tobago
- Skanda Mata Shakti Kovil Barrackpore, Trinidad and Tobago
- Muneshwarran Mandir, Chaguanas, Trinidad and Tobago
- Sri Kaliamman Kovil, Arouca, Trinidad and Tobago
- Shri Adi Shakti Para Brahm Swaroopini Mandir, Siparia, Trinidad and Tobago
- Jai Kali Shakti Mandir, Saint Augustine, Trinidad and Tobago

=== Suriname ===
- Tri Shakti Kali Devi Mandir, Suriname

=== Martinique ===
- Temple Hindou, Basse-Pointe, Martinique

=== Guadeloupe ===
- Shingam's Kovil, Le Moule, Guadeloupe
- Temple Mariamman Lalsingue, Les Abymes, Guadeloupe

=== Venezuela ===
- Sri Caliamman Chakti Poderosas Covil, El Callao, Bolivar, Venezuela

=== North America ===
- Shri Maha Kali Ammaa Mandir, Brampton, Ontario, Canada
- Meenakshi Mariamman Devi Mandir, Deland, Florida, United States
- Jamaica Kali Mandir, New York City, New York, United States
- Shri Mariamman Temple, Opa-Locka, Florida, United States

== See also ==
- Hinduism in Trinidad and Tobago
- Hinduism in Guyana
- Hinduism in Martinique
- Hinduism in Suriname
- Hinduism in Jamaica
- Indo-Caribbean
- Shaktism
