= Hinduism in Suriname =

Surinamese Hindus

Total population
- 129,440 (2015) constituting 23.15% of the population.

Regions with significant populations
- Suriname; Netherlands · Guyana · Dutch Caribbean · French Guiana

Religions
- Hinduism (Sanātana Dharma); Majority sect Sanātanī (80.58%); Minority sects Arya Samaj (13.81%) · Sathya Sai Baba movement · Kabir Panth · Hindu atheism · Others

Scriptures
- Vedas · Puranas · Upanishads · Ramayana (incl. Ramcharitmanas retelling) · Mahabharata (incl. Bhagavad Gita) · other Hindu texts

Languages
- Sanskrit (liturgical language); Sarnami Hindustani · Surinamese Dutch ·

Related ethnic groups
- Dutch Hindus · Guyanese Hindus · Trinidadian and Tobagonian Hindus · Jamaican Hindus · other Caribbean Hindus

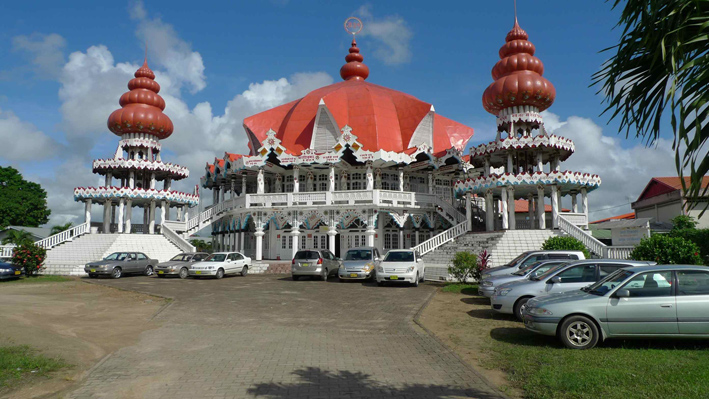
Arya Diwaker Hindu temple in Paramaribo

Hinduism in Suriname is the second-largest religion. According to ARDA, there are 129,440 Hindus in Suriname as of 2015, constituting 23.15% of the population. Suriname has the second largest percentage of Hindus in the Western Hemisphere, after Guyana (24.8%).

== History ==
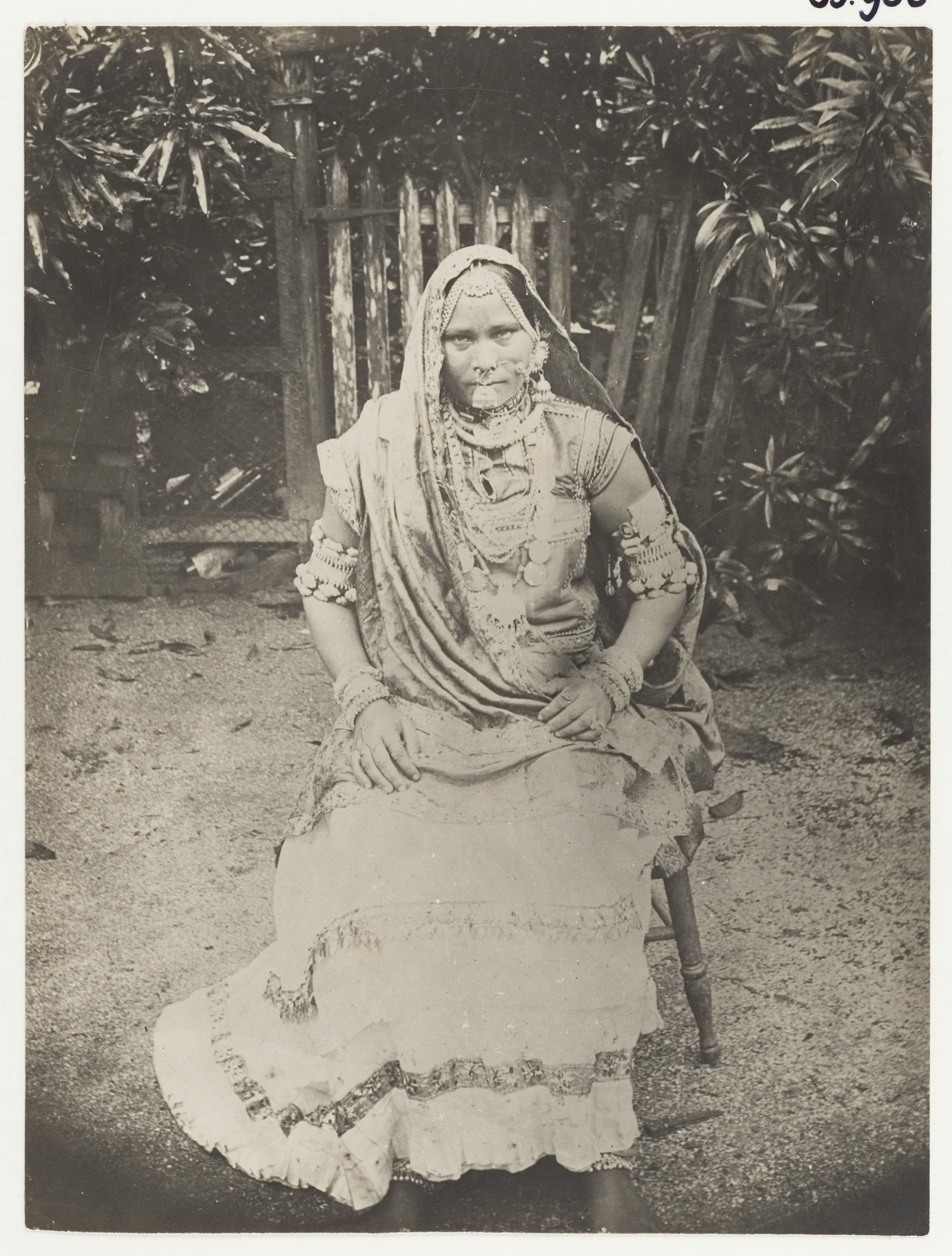
Hindu woman festively dressed in Suriname in 1900

The story of Hindus in Suriname is broadly parallel to that in Guyana and Trinidad and Tobago. Indian indentured labourers were sent to colonial Dutch Guiana by special arrangement between the Dutch and British. The difference is that the Netherlands' more liberal policy toward Hinduism allowed a stronger culture to develop. Example is the almost universal reading of the Bhagavad Gita, the Ramcharitmanas, and the Ramayana.

== Demographics ==
According to ARDA, there are 129,440 Hindus in Suriname as of 2015, constituting 23.15% of the population.

=== Population by year ===
| Year | Percent of Hindus | Change |
|---|---|---|
| 1900 | 16.4% | - |
| 1916 | 19.8% | +3.4% |
| 1936 | 21.8% | +2.0% |
| 1946 | 19.5% | -2.3% |
| 1964 | 27% | +7.5% |
| 1971 | 29.5% | +2.5% |
| 1980 | 27.4% | -2.1% |
| 2004 | 19.9% | -7.4% |
| 2012 | 22.3% | +2.4% |
| 2015 | 23.1% | +0.8% |

The percentage of Hindus increased initially (1900 – 1930s), fluctuated slightly between the 1930s and 1980s, and remained stable in the 20s (20%).The demographic changes in the religious population in the first half of the 20th century can be explained by migration. In the second half of the 20th century, in particular after 1970s the decline of Hindus might be explained by large migration to the Netherlands during the independence (1975) and the military regime in the 1980-1987.

=== Population by districts ===
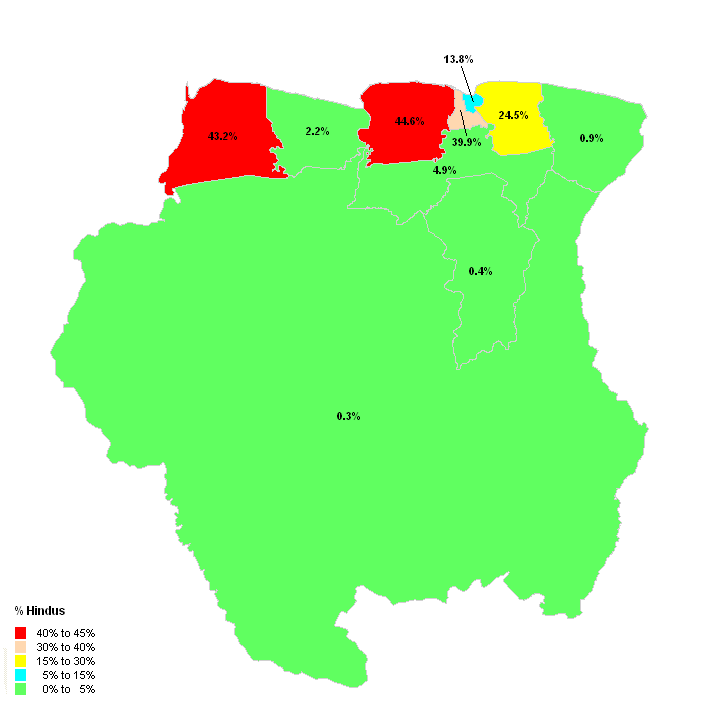
Distribution of Hindus by district

| District | Percent of Hindus |
|---|---|
| Saramacca | 44.6% |
| Nickerie | 43.2% |
| Wanica | 39.9% |
| Commewijne District | 24.5% |
| Paramaribo | 13.8% |
| Para | 4.9% |
| Coronie | 2.2% |
| Marowijne | 0.9% |
| Brokopondo | 0.4% |
| Sipaliwini | 0.3% |

== Hindu denominations ==
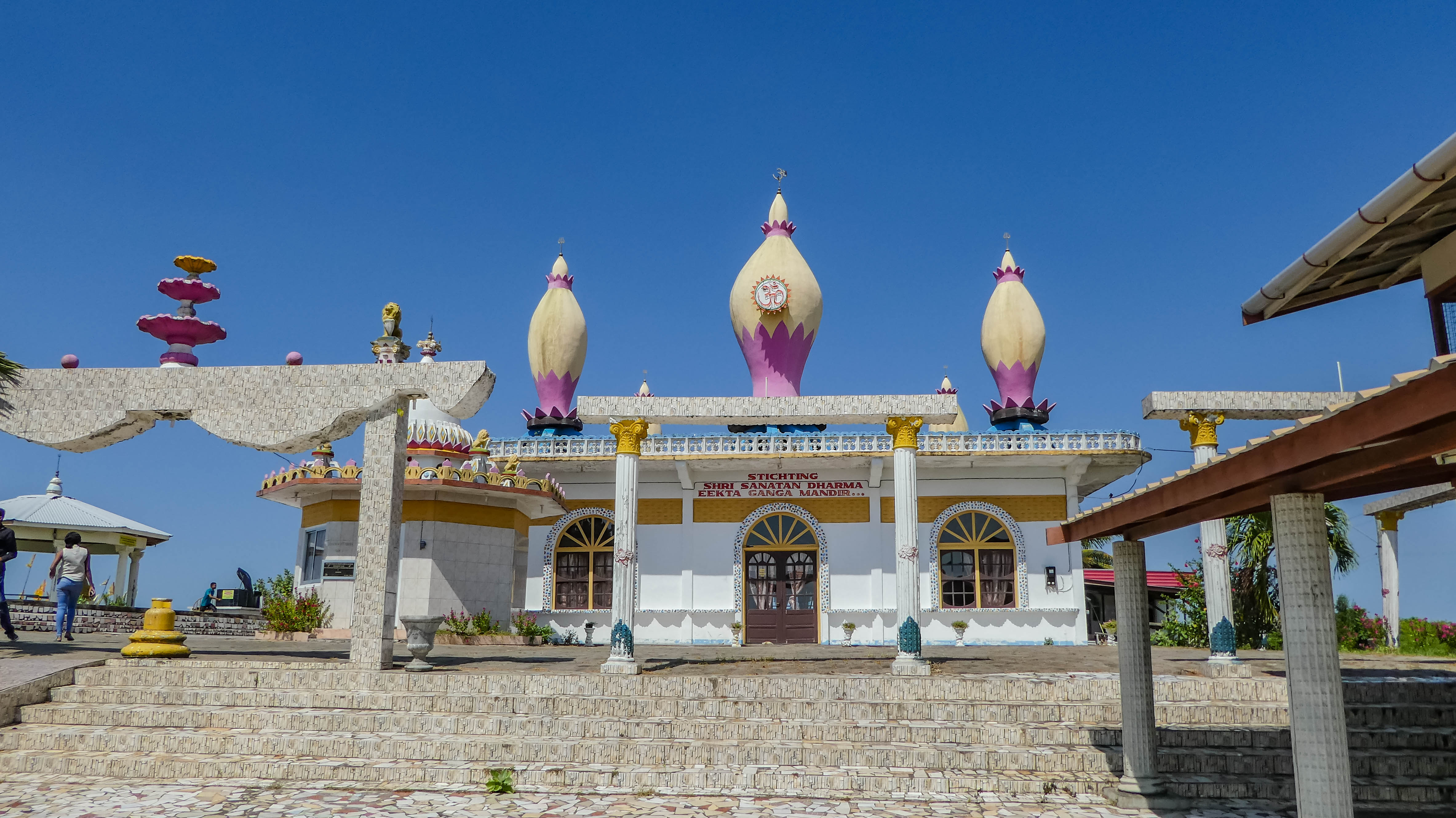
Hindu temple in Nickerie

According to the 2012 census, 18% of Surinamese are Sanatani Hindus, 3.1% are Arya Samaj, and the remaining 1.2% followed other forms of Hinduism.

ISKCON also have a presence in Suriname. The first Hare Krishna devotees to visit Suriname were devotees from Guyana way back in the early 1980s. The first Center was established about two decades ago, and now there is a vibrant preaching center in the country’s second city, New Nickerie.

== Ethnicity ==
Ethnicity
| Ethnicity | Percent |
| Indian | 95.7% |
| Mixed | 2.6% |
| Javanese | 0.75% |
| Creole | 0.14% |
| Chinese | 0.13% |
| Others | 0.2% |

Majority of the Hindus in Suriname are East Indians, both in absolute terms and in percentage. Hinduism has a considerable following among Mixed ethnic people (3,210 people) and Javanese Surinamese (915 people). Hinduism is also practised among Chinese Surinamese (157 people), Creole (142 people), Maroon (84 people), Indigenous people (83 people) and Afro-Surinamese (59 people).

| Ethnic group | Percent of Ethnic group practising Hinduism |
|---|---|
| Indo-Surinamese | 78% |
| Mixed | 2.4% |
| Chinese | 1% |
| Afro-Surinamese | 0.5% |
| Javanese | 1.2% |
| Indigenous people | 0.04% |
| Creole | 0.017% |
| Maroon | 0.007% |

== Contemporary Society ==
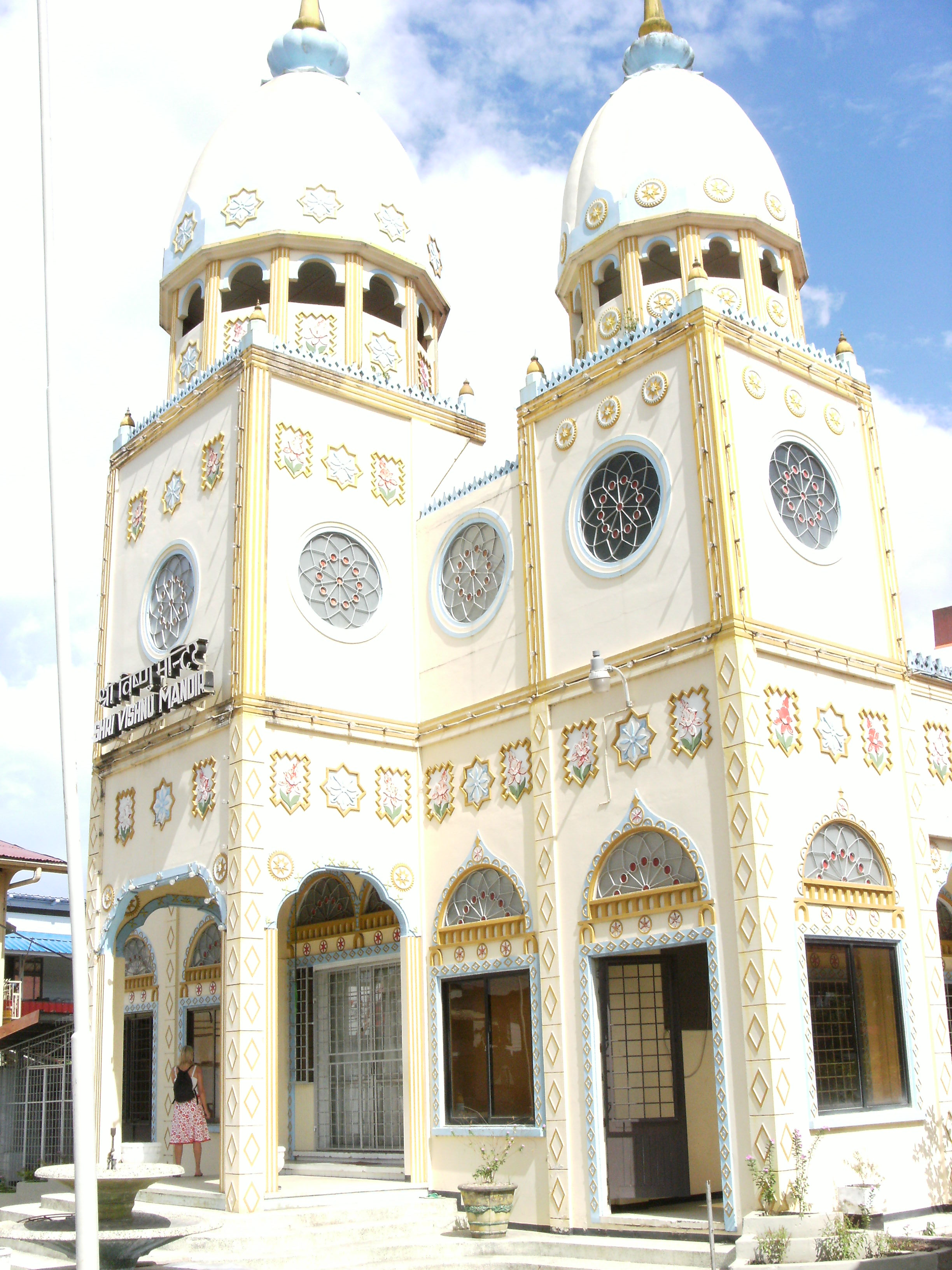
Shri Vishnu mandir, Paramaribo

=== Language ===
In contrast to the neighbouring Guyanese Hindus who speak English, most of the Surinamese Hindus speak Sarnami Hindustani. This is largely because the Dutch did not force the Indo-Caribbean population to abandon their native languages, unlike in British colonies like Trinidad and Guyana, where English was imposed as a means of attempting to erase cultural and religious traditions.

=== Festivals ===
Diwali and Holi are national holidays in Suriname.

== List of Hindu temples ==
The following is a list of Hindu temples in Suriname:

- The Arya Dewaker (वही आर्य देवकर)
- Radha Krishna Mandir, Commissaris Roblesweg 1299, Suriname
- Brahma Kumaris - Straat 9, Tourtonne III - Paramaribo
- Shri Satnarain Mandir
- Arsche Hindu Temple
- Radh Krishna Mandir Jai Tera Match see Zindza
- Shri Satnarain Mandir
- Shri Jagadambe Mandir Griend Diendo
- Hindu Community Centre, New TJ Lelystad
- Sri Sivasubramaniya Thevastanam

== See also ==
- Hinduism in Trinidad and Tobago
- Hinduism in Belize
- Hinduism in the Netherlands
- Hinduism in Guyana
- Hinduism in Guadeloupe
