= Hindus =

Adherents of Hinduism

- The name of Om, a common symbol of the Hindus

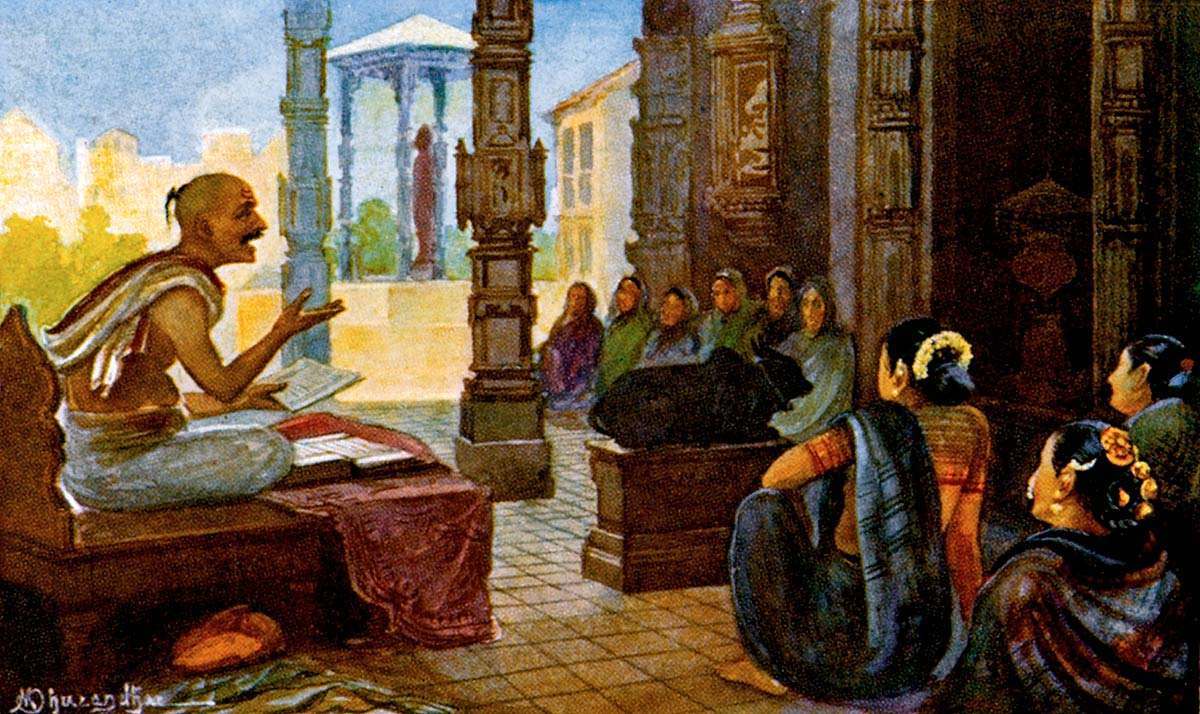
- A painting by M. V. Dhurandhar (1905) depicting Hindu devotees gathered in satsang, attentively listening to a pravachan on the Puranas

Total population
- c. 1.17 billion (14.9% of the global population)▲ (Worldwide, 2020 est.)

Regions with significant populations
- India: 1,113,200,000
- Nepal: 23,520,000
- Bangladesh: 13,140,000
- Pakistan: 5,030,000
- Indonesia: 4,350,000
- Sri Lanka: 3,280,000
- United States: 3,040,000
- Malaysia: 2,070,000
- United Kingdom: 1,140,000
- United Arab Emirates: 1,110,000

Religions
- Hinduism: 67.6% Vaishnavism 26.6% Shaivism 3.2% Shaktism; 2.6% other Hindu traditions, e.g. Neo-Hinduism, Reform Hinduism and Hindu atheism

Scriptures
- Śruti; Vedas, Samhitas, Brahmanas, Aranyakas, Upanishads; Smriti: Upavedas, Darśanas, Dharmashastras, Shastras, Agamas, Tantras, Puranas, Upapuranas, Ramayana (Ramcharitmanas & other Ramayana versions), Mahabharata (incl. Bhagavad Gita), Sutras, Stotras, Subhashitas, Bhashyas and others

Languages
- Sacred language: Vedic Sanskrit; Sanskrit; Old Tamil (Considered sacred by large South Indian sects); Predominant spoken languages: Ahirwati; Assamese; Awadhi; Bagheli; Bagri; Balochi; Bengali; Bhili; Bhojpuri; Bishnupriya Manipuri; Boro; Braj Bhasha; Bundeli; Burmese; Chhattisgarhi; Chitrali; Chittagonian; Dhatki; Dhundari; Dogri; Doteli; Dzongkha; Garhwali; Goaria; Gondi; Gujarati; Gujari; Gurung; Hadauti; Haryanvi; Hindi; Hindko; Kalasha-mun; Kannada; Kannauji; Kashmiri; Khandeshi; Khortha; Kokborok; Konkani; Kumaoni; Kurukh; Kutchi; Ladakhi; Lambadi; Limbu; Magadhi; Magar; Maithili; Malayalam; Malto; Malvi; Marathi; Marwari; Manipuri; Mewati; Mundari; Nagpuri; Nepali; Newar; Nimadi; Od; Odia; Pashto; Punjabi; Sanskrit; Santhali; Saraiki; Saurashtra; Shekhawati; Sikkimese; Sindhi; Sylheti; Tamang; Tamil; Telugu; Tharu; Tulu; Western Pahari; other South Asian languages; Balinese; Cham; Indonesian; Javanese; Khmer; Malay; Osing; Sundanese; Thai; Tenggerese; English; Dutch; French; Romani; Russian; Malay Chetty Creole; Caribbean Hindustani; Caribbean English; Fiji Hindi; Pidgin Fijian; Arabic; Afrikaans; Mauritian Creole; Réunion Creole; Seychellois Creole; and others

Hindus (/ˈhɪnduːz/ HIN-dooz; Hindustani: [ˈɦɪndu]) are people who religiously adhere to Hinduism. Historically, Hindu has been used as a geographical, cultural, and later religious identifier for people living in the Indian subcontinent.

It is assumed that the term "Hindu" traces back to Avestan scripture Vendidad which refers to the land of seven rivers as Hapta Hendu, which itself is cognate with the Sanskrit term Sapta Sindhuḥ. (The term Sapta Sindhuḥ is mentioned in Rig Veda and refers to a Northwestern Indian region of seven rivers and to India as a whole.) The Greek cognates of the same terms are "Indus" (for the river) and "India" (for the land of the river). Likewise, the Hebrew cognate hōd-dū refers to India mentioned in the Hebrew Bible (Book of Esther, Esther 1:1). The term "Hindu" also implied a geographic, ethnic, or cultural identifier for people living in the Indian subcontinent around or beyond the Sindhu (Indus) River. By the 16th century CE, the term began to refer to residents of the subcontinent who were not Turkic or Muslims. (Note: Flood (1996, p. 6) adds: "(...) 'Hindu', or 'Hindoo', was used towards the end of the eighteenth century by the British to refer to the people of 'Hindustan', the people of northwest India. Eventually 'Hindu' became virtually equivalent to an 'Indian' who was not a Muslim, Sikh, Jain or Christian, thereby encompassing a range of religious beliefs and practices. The '-ism' was added to Hindu in around 1830 to denote the culture and religion of the high-caste Brahmans in contrast to other religions, and the term was soon appropriated by Indians themselves in the context of building a national identity opposed to colonialism, though the term 'Hindu' was used in Sanskrit and Bengali hagiographic texts in contrast to 'Yavana' or Muslim as early as the sixteenth century".) (Note: von Stietencron (2005, p. 229): For more than 100 years the word Hindu (plural) continued to denote the Indians in general. But when, from AD 712 onwards, Muslims began to settle permanently in the Indus valley and to make converts among low-caste Hindus, Persian authors distinguished between Hindus and Muslims in India: Hindus were Indians other than Muslim. We know that Persian scholars were able to distinguish a number of religions among the Hindus. But when Europeans started to use the term Hindoo, they applied it to the non-Muslim masses of India without those scholarly differentiations.)

The historical development of Hindu self-identity within the local Indian population, in a religious or cultural sense, is unclear. Competing theories state that Hindu identity developed in the British colonial era, or that it may have developed post-8th century CE after the Muslim invasions and medieval Hindu–Muslim wars. A sense of Hindu identity and the term Hindu appears in some texts dated between the 13th and 18th centuries in Sanskrit and Bengali. The 14th- and 18th-century Indian poets such as Vidyapati, Kabir, Tulsidas and Eknath used the phrase Hindu dharma (Hinduism) and contrasted it with Turaka dharma (Islam). The Christian friar Sebastiao Manrique used the term 'Hindu' in a religious context in 1649. In the 18th century, European merchants and colonists began to refer to the followers of Indian religions collectively as Hindus, in contrast to Mohamedans for groups such as Turks, Mughals and Arabs, who were adherents of Islam. By the mid-19th century, colonial orientalist texts further distinguished Hindus from Buddhists, Sikhs, and Jains, but the colonial laws continued to consider all of them to be within the scope of the term Hindu until about the mid-20th century. Scholars state that the custom of distinguishing between Hindus, Buddhists, Jains, and Sikhs is a modern phenomenon. (Note: Despite the commonplace use of the term "Hindu" for the followers of the Hindu religion, the term also continues to designate a cultural identity, the ownership of India's millennia-old cultural heritage. Arvind Sharma notes that the exclusivist conception of religion was foreign to India, and Indians did not yield to it during the centuries of Muslim rule but only under the British colonial rule. Resistance to the exclusivist conception led to Savarkar's Hindutva, where Hinduism was seen both as a religion and a culture. Hindutva is a national Hindu-ness, by which a Hindu is one born in India and behaves like a Hindu. M. S. Golwalkar even spoke of "Hindu Muslims", meaning "Hindu by culture, Muslim by religion".)

At approximately 1.17 billion, Hindus are the world's third-largest religious group after Christians and Muslims, accounting for 14.9% of the global population. The only two Hindu-majority countries are India and Nepal, and both together account for more than 95% of the global Hindu population. After them, the countries with the largest Hindu populations are, in decreasing order: Bangladesh, Pakistan, Indonesia, Sri Lanka, the United States, Malaysia, the United Arab Emirates and the United Kingdom. These together accounted for 99% of the world's Hindu population, and the remaining nations of the world combined had about 6 million Hindus as of 2010. In the modern era, Hindus have faced religious persecution outside India in Pakistan, Bangladesh, Afghanistan, Sri Lanka, Bhutan and Myanmar.

== Etymology ==
The word Hindu is an exonym. This word Hindu is derived from the Indo-Aryan and Sanskrit word Sindhu, which means "a large body of water", covering "river, ocean". (Note: Flood (2008, p. 3): The Indo-Aryan word Sindhu means "river", "ocean".) It was used as the name of the Indus River and also referred to its tributaries. The actual term 'hindu' first occurs, states Gavin Flood, as "a Persian geographical term for the people who lived beyond the river Indus (Sanskrit: Sindhu)", more specifically in the 5th-century BCE DNa inscription of Darius I, an Achaemenid king. The Punjab region, called Sapta Sindhu in the Vedas, is called Hapta Hindu (seven rivers) in the Zend Avesta. The 6th-century BCE inscription of Darius I mentions the province of Hi[n]dush, referring to northwestern India. The people of India were referred to as Hinduvān and hindavī was used as the adjective for Indian language in the Chachnama, composed in the 8th or 13th century CE. According to D. N. Jha, the term 'Hindu' in these ancient records is an ethno-geographical term and did not refer to a religion.

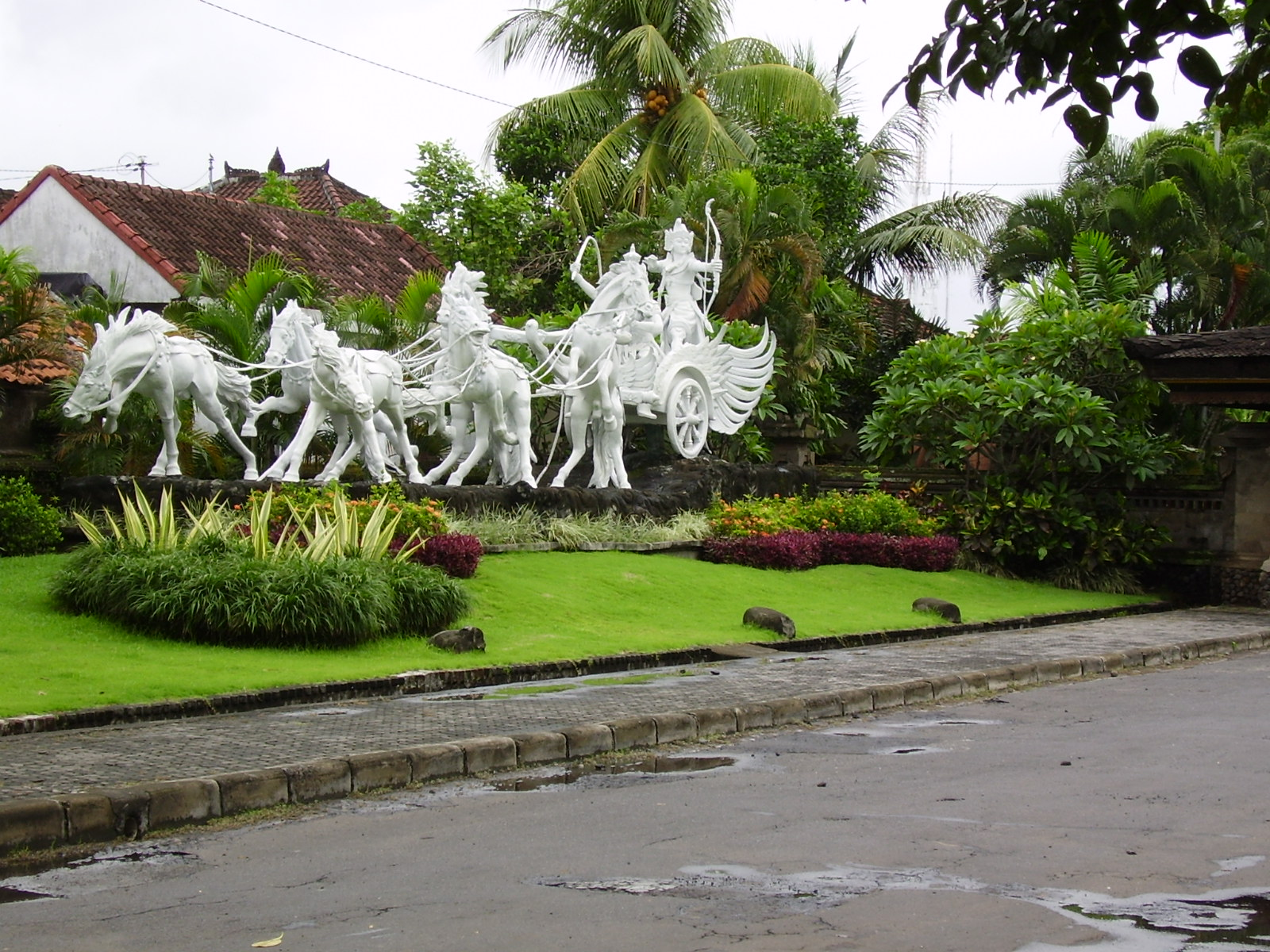
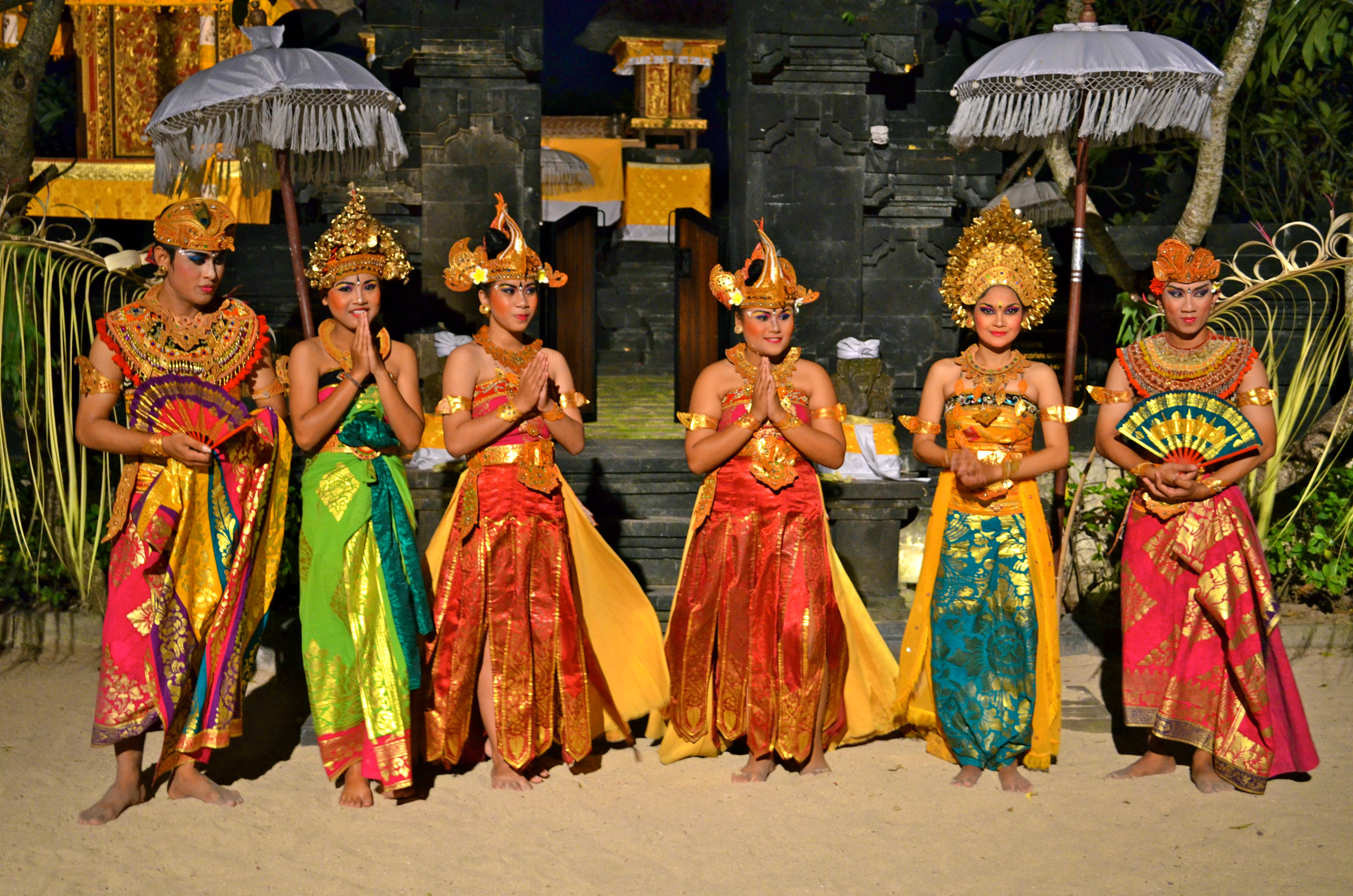
Hindu culture in Bali, Indonesia. The Krishna-Arjuna sculpture inspired by the Bhagavad Gita in Denpasar (top), and Hindu dancers in traditional dress.

The earliest known records of 'Hindu' with connotations of religion may be in the 7th-century CE Chinese text Records on the Western Regions by the Buddhist scholar Xuanzang. Xuanzang uses the transliterated term In-tu whose "connotation overflows in the religious" according to Arvind Sharma. While Xuanzang suggested that the term refers to the country named after the moon, another Buddhist scholar I-tsing contradicted the conclusion saying that In-tu was not a common name for the country.

Al-Biruni's 11th-century text Tarikh Al-Hind, and the texts of the Delhi Sultanate period described Hinduism in-depth and compared it to other traditions, noting "that the Buddhists are closer to the Hindus than the Muslims".. However, Al-Biruni uses the term "al-hind". The 'Hindu' community occurs as the amorphous 'Other' of the Muslim community in the court chronicles, according to the Indian historian Romila Thapar. The comparative religion scholar Wilfred Cantwell Smith notes that the term 'Hindu' retained its geographical reference initially: 'Indian', 'indigenous, local', virtually 'native'. Slowly, the Indian groups themselves started using the term, differentiating themselves and their "traditional ways" from those of the invaders.

The text Prithviraj Raso, by Chand Bardai, about the 1192 CE defeat of Prithviraj Chauhan at the hands of Muhammad Ghori, is full of references to "Hindus" and "Turks", and at one stage, says "both the religions have drawn their curved swords;" however, the date of this text is unclear and considered by most scholars to be more recent. In Islamic literature, 'Abd al-Malik Isami's Persian work, Futuhu's-salatin, composed in the Deccan under Bahmani rule in 1350, uses the word 'hindi' to mean Indian in the ethno-geographical sense and the word 'hindu' to mean 'Hindu' in the sense of a follower of the Hindu religion". The poet Vidyapati's Kirtilata (1380) uses the term Hindu in the sense of a religion, it contrasts the cultures of Hindus and Turks (Muslims) in a city and concludes "The Hindus and the Turks live close together; Each makes fun of the other's religion (dhamme)" albeit Naqshbandi Indian sufi inhabitations in Constantinople were often attributed as Hindular Tekkesi in Ottoman Turkish.

One of the earliest uses of the word 'Hindu' in a religious context, in a European language (Spanish), was in a publication in 1649 by Sebastio Manrique. In Indian historian D. N. Jha's essay "Looking for a Hindu identity", he writes: "No Indians described themselves as Hindus before the fourteenth century" and that "The British borrowed the word 'Hindu' from India, gave it a new meaning and significance, [and] reimported it into India as a reified phenomenon called Hinduism." In the 18th century, the European merchants and colonists began to refer to the followers of Indian religions collectively as Hindus even though in the 19th century, this term was used for Afghan-origin Muslim emperor Ibrahim Lodi as Hindoo emperor in Encyclopædia Americana (Lieber) of 1829.

Other prominent mentions of 'Hindu' include the epigraphical inscriptions from kingdoms (in present-day Andhra Pradesh) which battled military expansion of Muslim rulers in the 14th century, where the word 'Hindu' partly implies a religious identity in contrast to 'Turks' or Islamic religious identity. The term Hindu was later used occasionally in some Sanskrit texts such as the later Rajataranginis of Kashmir (Hinduka, c. 1450) and some 16th- to 18th-century Bengali Gaudiya Vaishnava texts, including Chaitanya Charitamrita and Chaitanya Bhagavata. The Bengali texts used the term to contrast Hindus from Yavanas (foreigners) or Mlecchas (barbarians), who are specified as Muslims in the later 18th-century texts. The 16th-century Chaitanya Charitamrita text and the 17th-century Bhakta Mala text used the phrases "Hindu dharma" and "Hindura dharma".

The term Sanatani has recently been used by some traditional Hindus as a modern endonym to the exonym Hindu.

== Terminology ==
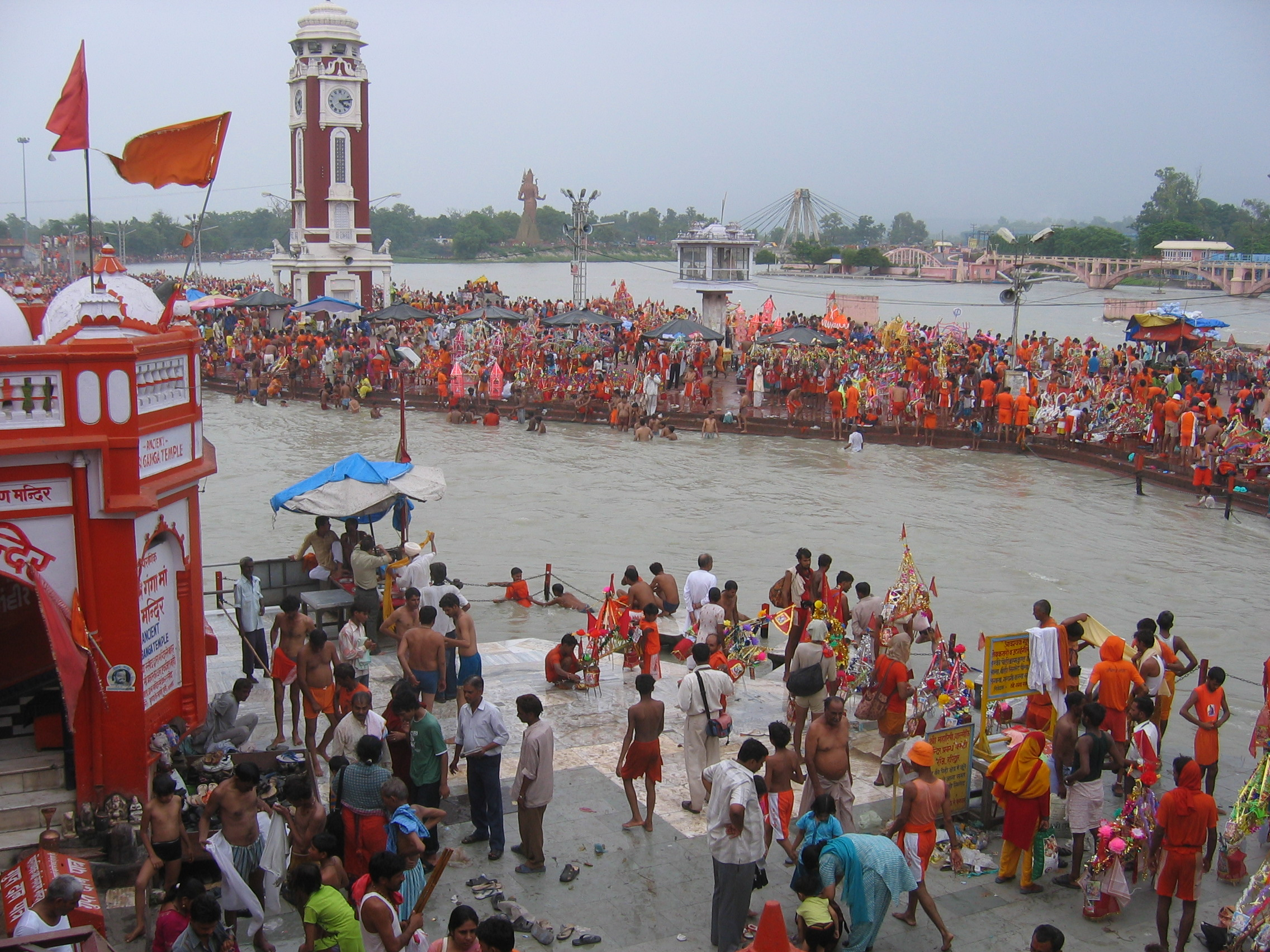
Hindus at Har Ki Pauri, Haridwar near river Ganges in Uttarakhand state of India.

=== Medieval-era usage (8th to 18th century) ===
Scholar Arvind Sharma notes that the term "Hindus" was used in the 'Brahmanabad settlement' which Muhammad ibn Qasim made with non-Muslims after the Arab invasion of northwestern Sindh region of India, in 712 CE. The term 'Hindu' meant people who were non-Muslims, and it included Buddhists of the region. In the 11th-century text of Al Biruni, Hindus are referred to as "religious antagonists" to Islam, as those who believe in rebirth, presents them as holding a diversity of beliefs, and seems to oscillate between Hindus holding a centralist and pluralist religious views. In the texts of Delhi Sultanate era, states Sharma, the term Hindu remains ambiguous on whether it means people of a region or religion, giving the example of Ibn Battuta's explanation of the name "Hindu Kush" for a mountain range in Afghanistan. It was so called, wrote Ibn Battuta, because many Indian slaves died there of freezing cold, as they were marched across the mountain range. The term Hindu there is ambivalent and could mean geographical region or religion.

The term Hindu also appears in the texts from the Mughal Empire era. Jahangir, for example, called the Sikh Guru Arjan a Hindu:

There was a Hindu named Arjan in Gobindwal on the banks of the Beas River. Pretending to be a spiritual guide, he had won over as devotees many simple-minded Indians and even some ignorant, stupid Muslims by broadcasting his claims to be a saint. [...] When Khusraw stopped at his residence, [Arjan] came out and had an interview with [Khusraw]. Giving him some elementary spiritual precepts picked up here and there, he made a mark with saffron on his forehead, which is called qashqa in the idiom of the Hindus and which they consider lucky. When this was reported to me, I realized how perfectly false he was and ordered him brought to me. I awarded his houses and dwellings and those of his children to Murtaza Khan, and I ordered his possessions and goods confiscated and him executed.

— Emperor Jahangir, Jahangirnama, 27b-28a (Translated by Wheeler Thackston) (Note: Prince Khusrau, Jahangir son, mounted a challenge to the emperor within the first year of his reign. The rebellion was put down and all the collaborators executed. (Pashaura Singh, 2005, pp. 31–34))

Sikh scholar Pashaura Singh states, "in Persian writings, Sikhs were regarded as Hindu in the sense of non-Muslim Indians". However, scholars like Robert Fraser and Mary Hammond opine that Sikhism began initially as a militant sect of Hinduism and it got formally separated from Hinduism only in the 20th century.

=== Colonial-era usage (18th to 20th century) ===
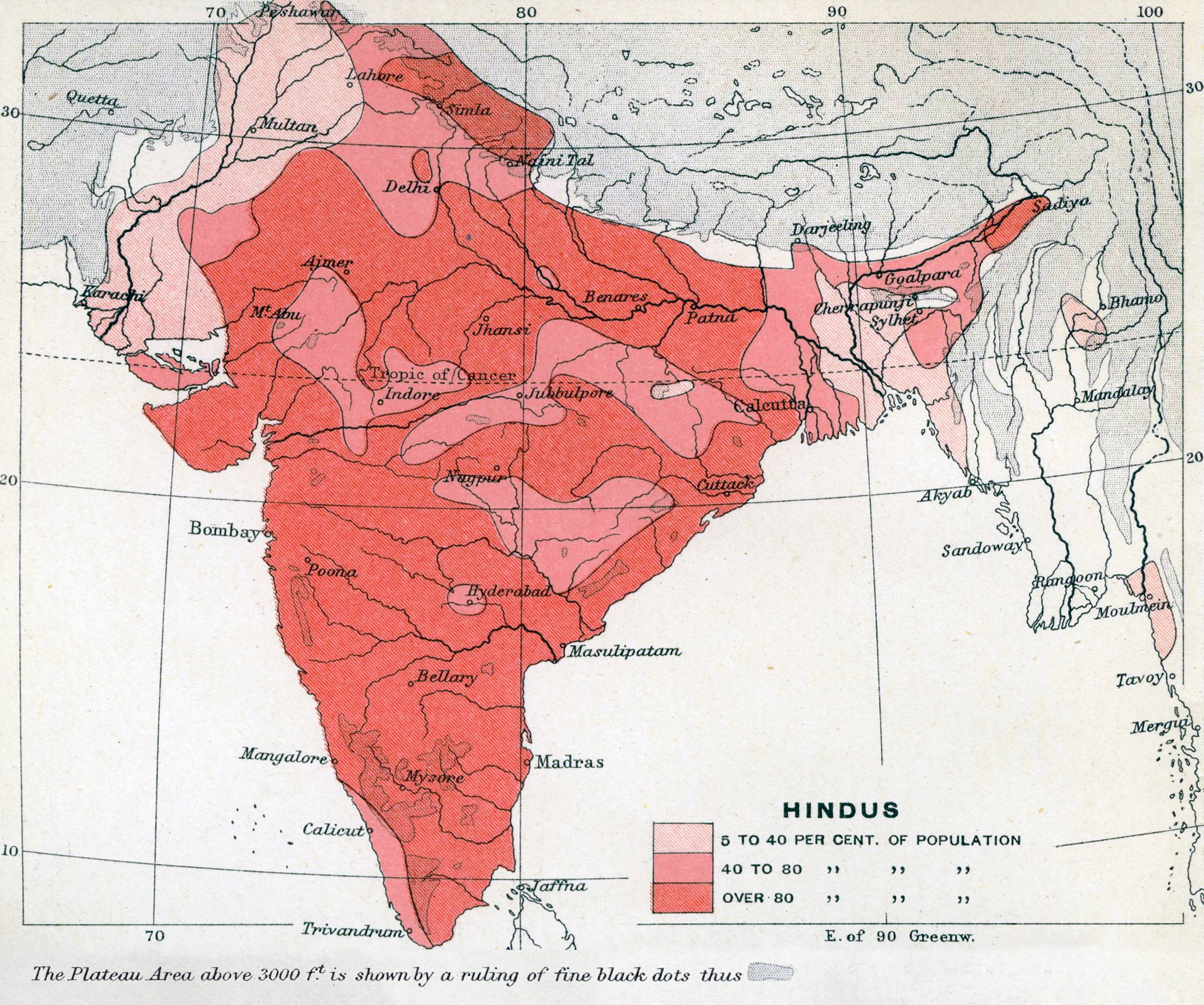
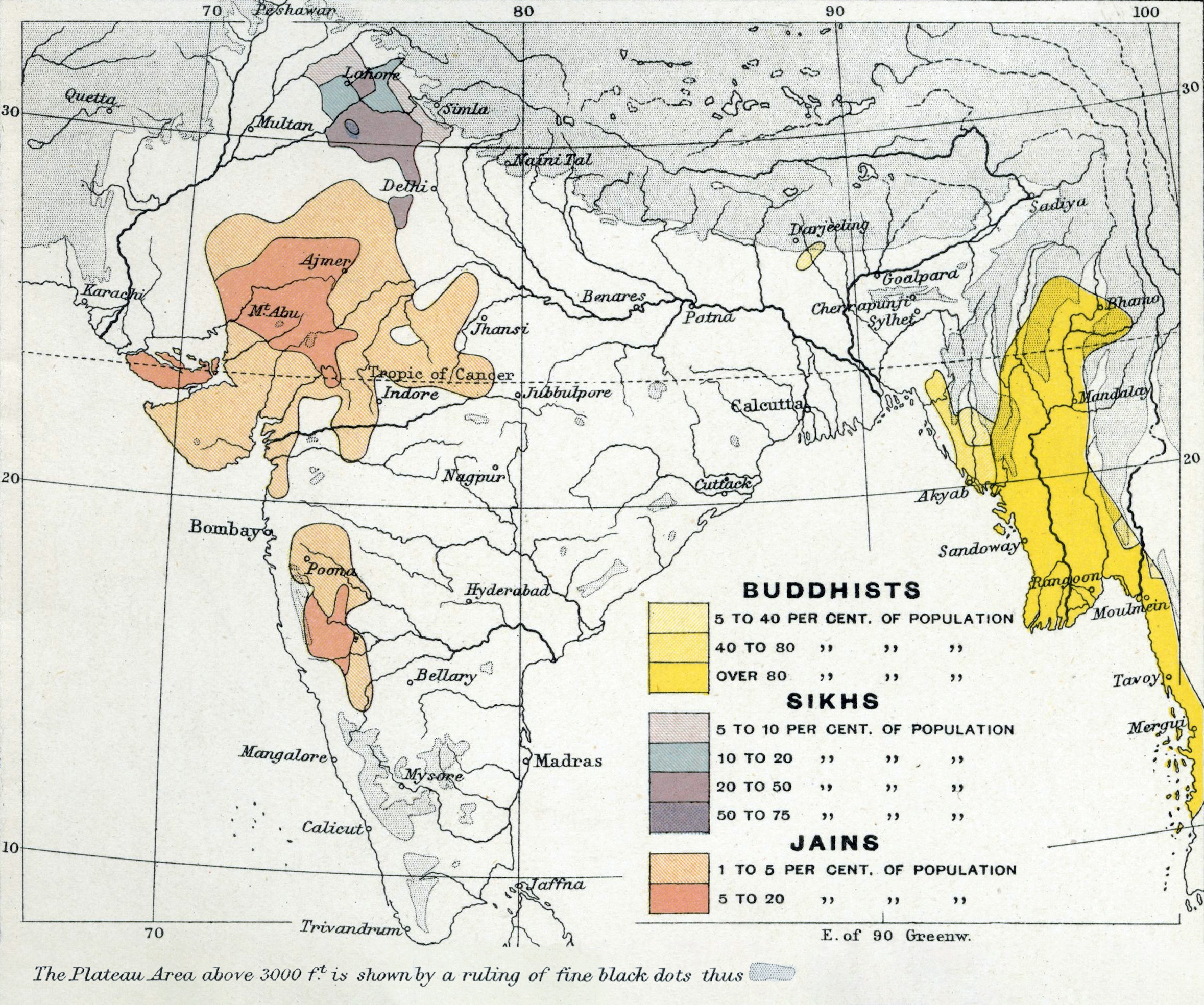
The distribution of Indian religions in India (1909). The upper map shows distribution of Hindus, the lower of Buddhists, Jains and Sikhs.

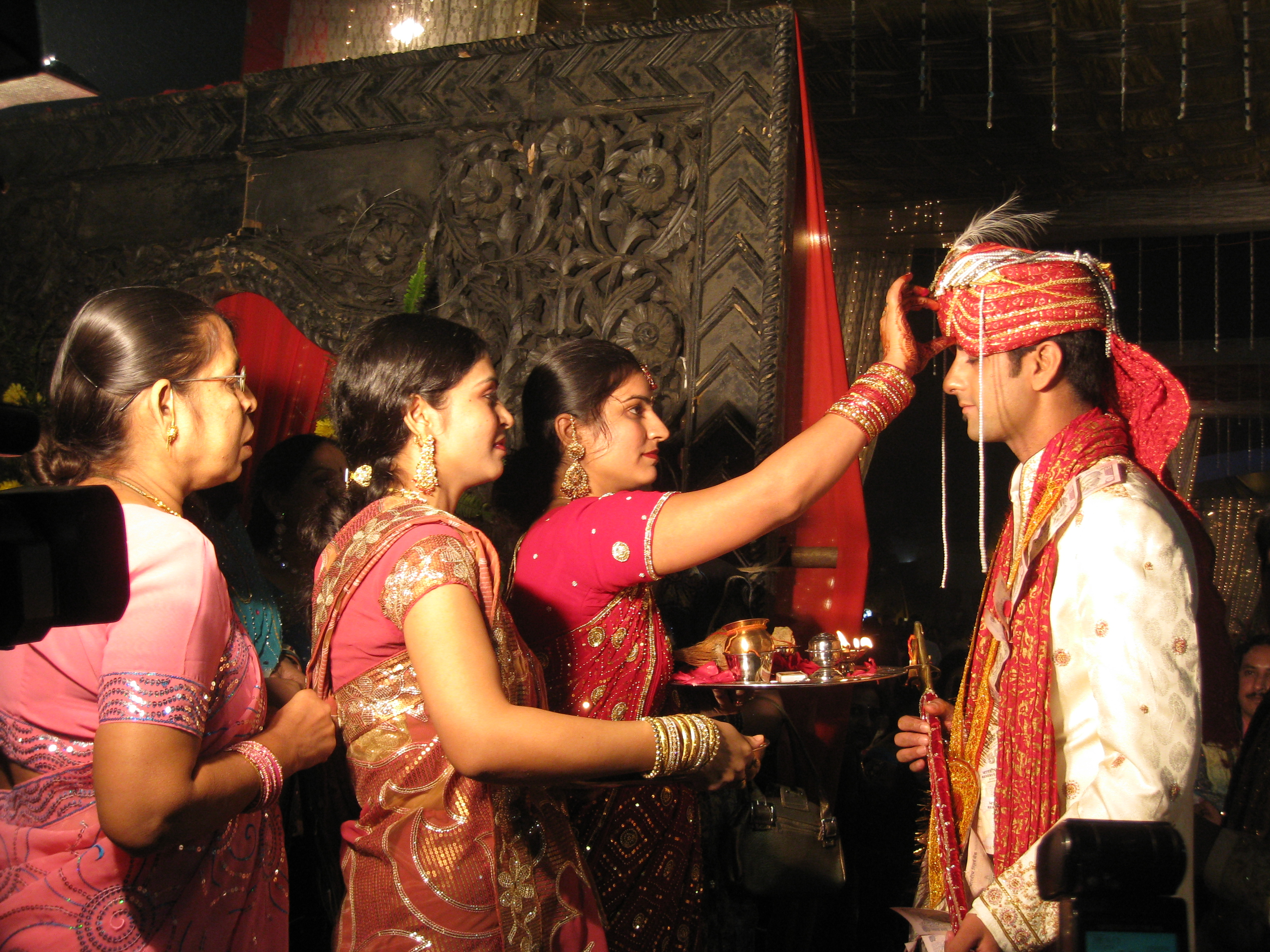
A Hindu wedding ritual in India

During the colonial era, the term Hindu had connotations of native religions of India, that is religions other than Christianity and Islam. In early colonial era Anglo-Hindu laws and British India court system, the term Hindu referred to people of all Indian religions as well as two non-Indian religions: Judaism and Zoroastrianism. In the 20th century, personal laws were formulated for Hindus, and the term 'Hindu' in these colonial 'Hindu laws' applied to Buddhists, Jains and Sikhs in addition to denominational Hindus. (Note: According to Ram Bhagat, the term was used by the Colonial British government in post-1871 census of colonial India that included a question on the individual's religion, especially in the aftermath of the 1857 revolution.)

Beyond the stipulations of British colonial law, European orientalists and particularly the influential Asiatick Researches founded in the 18th century, later called The Asiatic Society, initially identified just two religions in India – Islam, and Hinduism. These orientalists included all Indian religions such as Buddhism as a subgroup of Hinduism in the 18th century. These texts termed followers of Islam as Mohamedans, and all others as Hindus. The text, by the early 19th century, began dividing Hindus into separate groups, for chronology studies of the various beliefs. Among the earliest terms to emerge were Seeks and their College (later spelled Sikhs by Charles Wilkins), Boudhism (later spelled Buddhism), and in the 9th volume of Asiatick Researches report on religions in India, the term Jainism received notice.

According to Pennington, the terms Hindu and Hinduism were thus constructed for colonial studies of India. The various sub-divisions and separation of subgroup terms were assumed to be result of "communal conflict", and Hindu was constructed by these orientalists to imply people who adhered to "ancient default oppressive religious substratum of India", states Pennington. Followers of other Indian religions so identified were later referred Buddhists, Sikhs or Jains and distinguished from Hindus, in an antagonistic two-dimensional manner, with Hindus and Hinduism stereotyped as irrational traditional and others as rational reform religions. However, these mid-19th-century reports offered no indication of doctrinal or ritual differences between Hindu and Buddhist, or other newly constructed religious identities. These colonial studies, states Pennigton, "puzzled endlessly about the Hindus and intensely scrutinized them, but did not interrogate and avoided reporting the practices and religion of Mughal and Arabs in South Asia", and often relied on Muslim scholars to characterise Hindus.

=== Contemporary usage ===
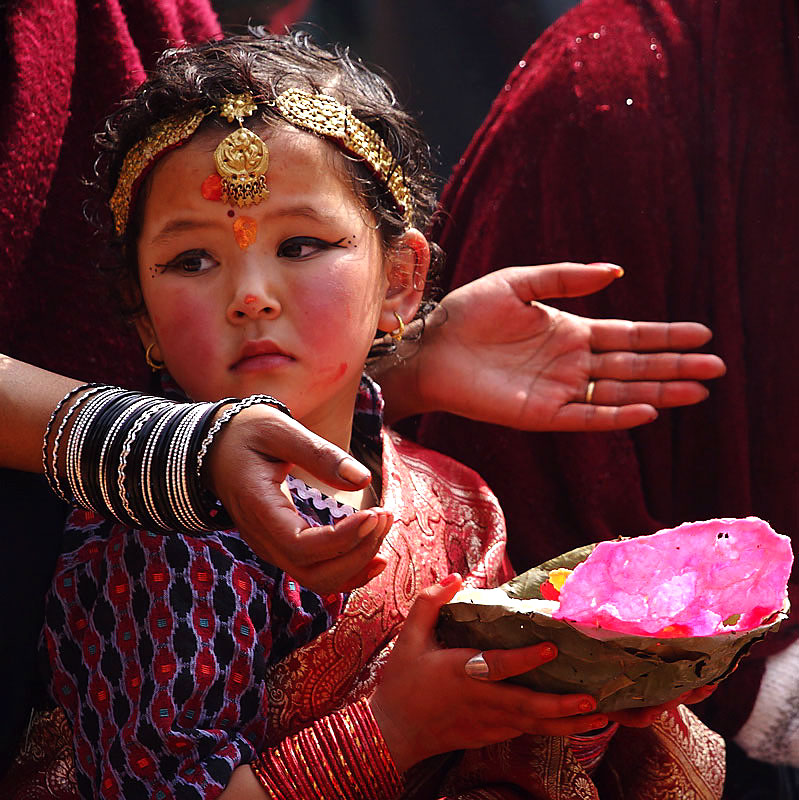
A young Nepali Hindu devotee during a traditional prayer ceremony at Kathmandu's Durbar Square.

In contemporary era, Hindus are individuals who identify with one or more aspects of Hinduism, whether they are practicing or non-practicing or laissez-faire. The term does not include those who identify with other Indian religions such as Buddhism, Jainism, Sikhism or various animist tribal religions found in India such as Sarnaism. The term Hindu, in contemporary parlance, includes people who accept themselves as culturally or ethnically Hindu rather than with a fixed set of religious beliefs within Hinduism. One need not be religious in the minimal sense, states Julius Lipner, to be accepted as Hindu by Hindus, or to describe oneself as Hindu.

Hindus subscribe to a diversity of ideas on spirituality and traditions, but have no ecclesiastical order, no unquestionable religious authorities, no governing body, nor a single founding prophet; Hindus can choose to be polytheistic, pantheistic, monotheistic, monistic, agnostic, atheistic or humanist. Because of the wide range of traditions and ideas covered by the term Hinduism, arriving at a comprehensive definition is difficult. The religion "defies our desire to define and categorize it". A Hindu may, by choice, draw upon ideas of other Indian or non-Indian religious thought as a resource, follow or evolve their personal beliefs, and still identify as a Hindu.

In 1995, Chief Justice P. B. Gajendragadkar was quoted in an Indian Supreme Court ruling:

When we think of the Hindu religion, unlike other religions in the world, the Hindu religion does not claim any one prophet; it does not worship any one god; it does not subscribe to any one dogma; it does not believe in any one philosophic concept; it does not follow any one set of religious rites or performances; in fact, it does not appear to satisfy the narrow traditional features of any religion or creed. It may broadly be described as a way of life and nothing more.

Although Hinduism contains a broad range of philosophies, Hindus share philosophical concepts, such as, but not limited to, dharma, karma, kama, artha, moksha and samsara, even if each subscribes to a diversity of views. Hindus also have shared texts such as the Vedas with embedded Upanishads, and common ritual grammar (Sanskara (rite of passage)) such as rituals during a wedding or when a baby is born or cremation rituals. Some Hindus go on pilgrimage to shared sites they consider spiritually significant, practice one or more forms of bhakti or puja, celebrate mythology and epics, major festivals, love and respect for guru and family, and other cultural traditions. A Hindu could:

- follow any of the Hindu schools of philosophy, such as Advaita (non-dualism), Vishishtadvaita (non-dualism of the qualified whole), Dvaita (dualism), Dvaitadvaita (dualism with non-dualism), etc.
- follow a tradition centred on any particular form of the Divine, such as Shaivism, Vaishnavism, Shaktism, etc.
- practice any one of the various forms of yoga systems in order to achieve moksha – that is freedom in current life (jivanmukti) or salvation in after-life (videhamukti);
- practice bhakti or puja for spiritual reasons, which may be directed to one's guru or to a divine image. A visible public form of this practice is the worship of a murti. Jeaneane Fowler states that non-Hindu observers often confuse this practice as "stone or idol-worship and nothing beyond it", while for many Hindus, it is an image which represents or is symbolic manifestation of a spiritual Absolute (Brahman). This practice may focus on a metal or stone statue, or a photographic image, or a linga, or any object or tree (pipal) or animal (cow) or tools of one's profession, or sunrise or expression of nature or to nothing at all, and the practice may involve meditation, japa, offerings or songs. Inden states that this practice means different things to different Hindus, and has been misunderstood, misrepresented as idolatry, and various rationalisations have been constructed by both Western and native Indologists.

=== Disputes ===
In the Constitution of India, the word "Hindu" has been used in some places to denote persons professing any of these religions: Hinduism, Jainism, Buddhism or Sikhism. This however has been challenged by the Sikhs and by neo-Buddhists who were formerly Hindus. According to Sheen and Boyle, Jains have not objected to being covered by personal laws termed under 'Hindu', but Indian courts have acknowledged that Jainism is a distinct religion.

The Republic of India is in the peculiar situation that the Supreme Court of India has repeatedly been called upon to define "Hinduism" because the Constitution of India, while it prohibits "discrimination of any citizen" on grounds of religion in article 15, article 30 foresees special rights for "All minorities, whether based on religion or language". As a consequence, religious groups have an interest in being recognised as distinct from the Hindu majority in order to qualify as a "religious minority". Thus, the Supreme Court was forced to consider the question whether Jainism is part of Hinduism in 2005 and 2006.

== History of Hindu identity ==
Sheldon Pollock suggests an emerging Hindu political identity that was grounded in the Hindu religious text of Ramayana, one that has continued into the modern times, and suggests that this historic process began with the arrival of Islam in India. Temples dedicated to deity Rama were built from north to south India, and textual records as well as hagiographic inscriptions began comparing the Hindu epic of Ramayana to regional kings and their response to Islamic attacks. The Yadava king of Devagiri named Ramacandra, for example states Pollock, is described in a 13th-century record as, "How is this Rama to be described, who freed Varanasi from the mleccha (barbarian, Turk Muslim) horde, and built there a golden temple of Sarngadhara". Pollock notes that the Yadava king Ramacandra is described as a devotee of deity Shiva (Shaivism), yet his political achievements and temple construction sponsorship in Varanasi, far from his kingdom's location in the Deccan region, is described in the historical records in Vaishnavism terms of Rama, a deity Vishnu avatar.

Brajadulal Chattopadhyaya has questioned the Pollock theory and presented textual and inscriptional evidence. According to Chattopadhyaya, the Hindu identity and religious response to Islamic invasion and wars developed in different kingdoms, such as wars between Islamic Sultanates and the Vijayanagara kingdom, and Islamic raids on the kingdoms in Tamil Nadu. These wars were described not just using the mythical story of Rama from Ramayana, states Chattopadhyaya, the medieval records used a wide range of religious symbolism and myths that are now considered as part of Hindu literature. This emergence of religious with political terminology began with the first Muslim invasion of Sindh in the 8th century CE, and intensified 13th century onwards. The 14th-century Sanskrit text, Madhuravijayam, a memoir written by Gangadevi, the wife of Vijayanagara prince, for example describes the consequences of war using religious terms,

I very much lament for what happened to the groves in Madhura,
The coconut trees have all been cut and in their place are to be seen,
rows of iron spikes with human skulls dangling at the points,
In the highways which were once charming with anklets sound of beautiful women,
are now heard ear-piercing noises of Brahmins being dragged, bound in iron-fetters,
The waters of Tambraparni, which were once white with sandal paste,
are now flowing red with the blood of cows slaughtered by miscreants,
Earth is no longer the producer of wealth, nor does Indra give timely rains,
The God of death takes his undue toll of what are left lives if undestroyed by the Yavanas [Muslims],
The Kali age now deserves deepest congratulations for being at the zenith of its power,
gone is the sacred learning, hidden is refinement, hushed is the voice of Dharma.

— Madhuravijayam, Translated by Brajadulal Chattopadhyaya

The historiographic writings in Telugu language from the 13th- and 14th-century Kakatiya dynasty period presents a similar "alien other (Turk)" and "self-identity (Hindu)" contrast. Chattopadhyaya, and other scholars, state that the military and political campaign during the medieval era wars in Deccan peninsula of India, and in the north India, were no longer a quest for sovereignty, they embodied a political and religious animosity against the "otherness of Islam", and this began the historical process of Hindu identity formation. (Note: Lorenzen (2010), p. 29: "When it comes to early sources written in Indian languages (and also Persian and Arabic), the word 'Hindu' is used in a clearly religious sense in a great number of texts at least as early as the sixteenth century. (...) Although al-Biruni's original Arabic text only uses a term equivalent to the religion of the people of India, his description of Hindu religion is in fact remarkably similar to those of nineteenth-century European orientalists. For his part Vidyapati, in his Apabhransha text Kirtilata, makes use of the phrase 'Hindu and Turk dharmas' in a clearly religious sense and highlights the local conflicts between the two communities. In the early sixteenth century texts attributed to Kabir, the references to 'Hindus' and to 'Turks' or 'Muslims' (musalamans) in a clearly religious context are numerous and unambiguous.")

Andrew Nicholson, in his review of scholarship on Hindu identity history, states that the vernacular literature of Bhakti movement sants from 15th to 17th century, such as Kabir, Anantadas, Eknath, Vidyapati, suggests that distinct religious identities, between Hindus and Turks (Muslims), had formed during these centuries. The poetry of this period contrasts Hindu and Islamic identities, states Nicholson, and the literature vilifies the Muslims coupled with a "distinct sense of a Hindu religious identity".

=== Hindu identity amidst other Indian religions ===
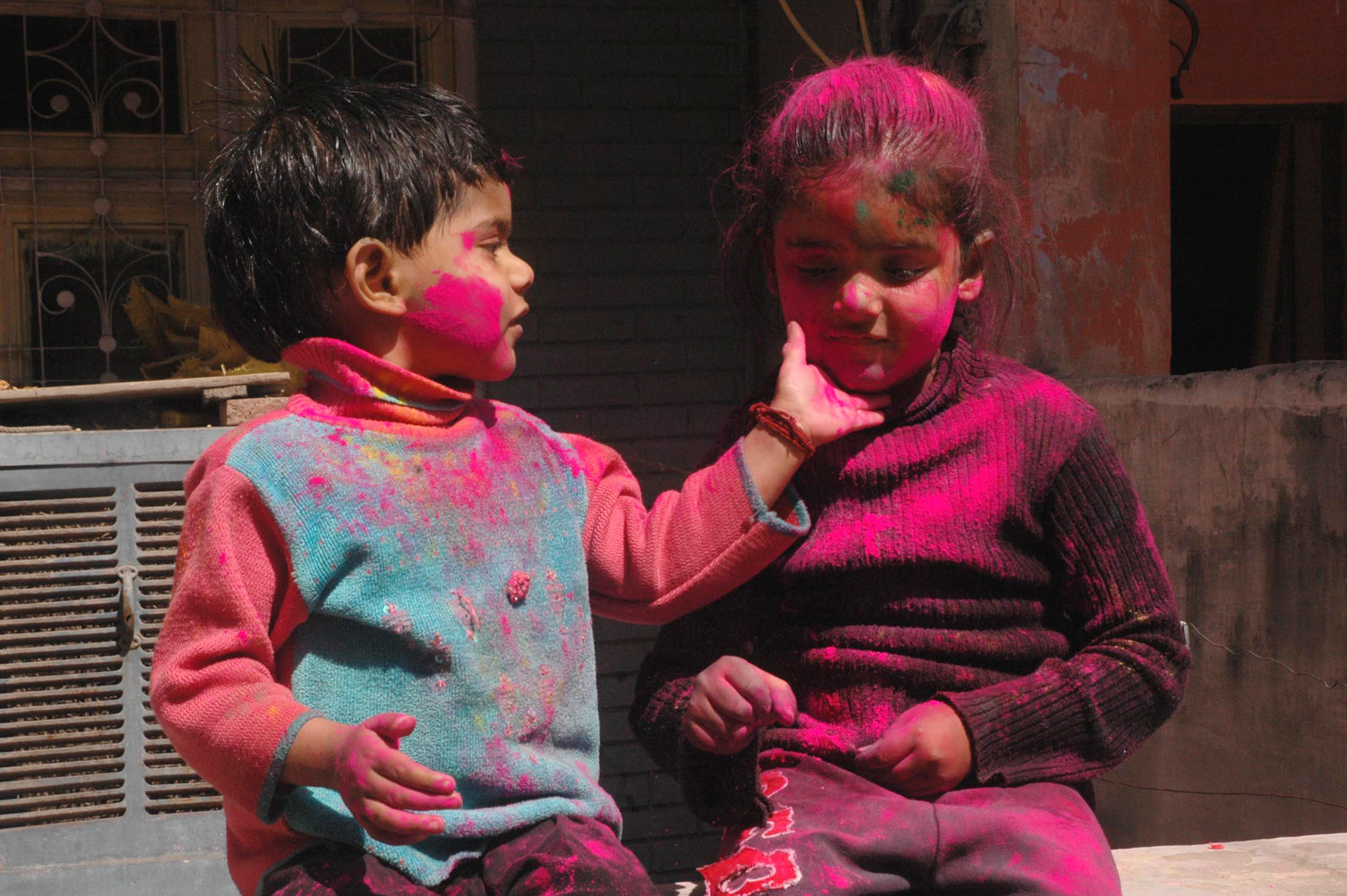
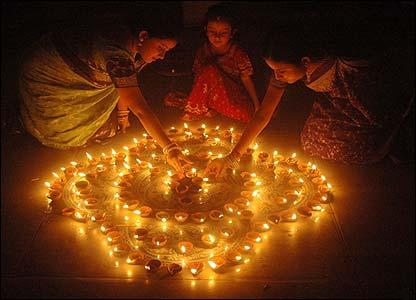
Hindus celebrating their major festivals, Holi (top) and Diwali.

Some scholars have questioned how important sectarian identities like Hindu, Muslim, Buddhist, Jain were in premodern India. Inscriptional evidence from the 8th century onwards, in regions such as South India, suggests that medieval era India, at both elite and folk religious practices level, likely had a "shared religious culture", and their collective identities were "multiple, layered and fuzzy". Even among Hinduism denominations such as Shaivism and Vaishnavism, the Hindu identities, states Leslie Orr, lacked "firm definitions and clear boundaries".

Overlaps in Jain-Hindu identities have included Jains worshipping Hindu deities, intermarriages between Jains and Hindus, and medieval era Jain temples featuring Hindu religious icons and sculpture. Beyond India, on Java island of Indonesia, historical records attest to marriages between Hindus and Buddhists, medieval era temple architecture and sculptures that simultaneously incorporate Hindu and Buddhist themes, where Hinduism and Buddhism merged and functioned as "two separate paths within one overall system", according to Ann Kenney and other scholars. Similarly, there is an organic relation of Sikhs to Hindus, states Zaehner, both in religious thought and their communities, and virtually all Sikhs' ancestors were Hindus. Marriages between Sikhs and Hindus, particularly among Khatris, were frequent. Some Hindu families brought up a son as a Sikh, and some Hindus view Sikhism as a tradition within Hinduism, even though the Sikh faith is a distinct religion.

Julius Lipner states that the custom of distinguishing between Hindus, Buddhists, Jains, and Sikhs is a modern phenomenon, but one that is a convenient abstraction. Distinguishing Indian traditions is a fairly recent practice, states Lipner, and is the result of "not only Western preconceptions about the nature of religion in general and of religion in India in particular, but also with the political awareness that has arisen in India" in its people and a result of Western influence during its colonial history.

=== Sacred geography ===
Scholars such as Fleming and Eck state that the post-Epic era literature from the 1st millennium CE amply demonstrate that there was a historic concept of the Indian subcontinent as a sacred geography, where the sacredness was a shared set of religious ideas. For example, the twelve Jyotirlingas of Shaivism and fifty-one Shaktipithas of Shaktism are described in the early medieval era Puranas as pilgrimage sites around a theme. This sacred geography and Shaiva temples with same iconography, shared themes, motifs and embedded legends are found across India, from the Himalayas to hills of South India, from Ellora Caves to Varanasi by about the middle of 1st millennium. Shakti temples, dated to a few centuries later, are verifiable across the subcontinent. Varanasi as a sacred pilgrimage site is documented in the Varanasimahatmya text embedded inside the Skanda Purana, and the oldest versions of this text are dated to 6th to 8th century CE.

The idea of twelve sacred sites in Shiva Hindu tradition spread across the Indian subcontinent appears not only in the medieval era temples but also in copper plate inscriptions and temple seals discovered in different sites. According to Bhardwaj, non-Hindu texts such as the memoirs of Chinese Buddhist and Persian Muslim travellers attest to the existence and significance of the pilgrimage to sacred geography among Hindus by later 1st millennium CE.

According to Fleming, those who question whether the term Hindu and Hinduism are a modern construction in a religious context present their arguments based on some texts that have survived into the modern era, either of Islamic courts or of literature published by Western missionaries or colonial-era Indologists aiming for a reasonable construction of history. However, the existence of non-textual evidence such as cave temples separated by thousands of kilometers, as well as lists of medieval era pilgrimage sites, is evidence of a shared sacred geography and existence of a community that was self-aware of shared religious premises and landscape. Further, it is a norm in evolving cultures that there is a gap between the "lived and historical realities" of a religious tradition and the emergence of related "textual authorities". The tradition and temples likely existed well before the medieval era Hindu manuscripts appeared that describe them and the sacred geography. This, states Fleming, is apparent given the sophistication of the architecture and the sacred sites along with the variance in the versions of the Puranic literature. According to Diana L. Eck and other Indologists such as André Wink, Muslim invaders were aware of Hindu sacred geography such as Mathura, Ujjain, and Varanasi by the 11th century. These sites became a target of their serial attacks in the centuries that followed.

=== Hindu persecution ===
The Hindus have been persecuted during the medieval and modern era. The medieval persecution included waves of plunder, killing, destruction of temples and enslavement by Turk-Mongol Muslim armies from central Asia. This is documented in Islamic literature such as those relating to 8th century Muhammad bin-Qasim, 11th century Mahmud of Ghazni, the Persian traveler Al Biruni, the 14th century Islamic army invasion led by Timur, and various Sunni Islamic rulers of the Delhi Sultanate and Mughal Empire. There were occasional exceptions such as Akbar who stopped the persecution of Hindus, and occasional severe persecution such as under Aurangzeb, (Note: See also "Aurangzeb, as he was according to Mughal Records"; more links at the bottom of that page. For Muslim historian's record on major Hindu temple destruction campaigns, from 1193 to 1729 AD, see Richard Eaton (2000), Temple Desecration and Indo-Muslim States, Journal of Islamic Studies, Vol. 11, Issue 3, pages 283–319) who destroyed temples, forcibly converted non-Muslims to Islam and banned the celebration of Hindu festivals such as Holi and Diwali.

Other recorded persecution of Hindus include those under the reign of 18th century Tipu Sultan in south India, and during the colonial era. In the modern era, religious persecution of Hindus have been reported outside India in Pakistan, Afghanistan, Bangladesh, Sri Lanka, and Myanmar.

=== Hindu nationalism ===
Christophe Jaffrelot states that modern Hindu nationalism was born in Maharashtra, in the 1920s, as a reaction to the Islamic Khilafat Movement wherein Indian Muslims championed and took the cause of the Turkish Ottoman sultan as the Caliph of all Muslims, at the end of the World War I. Hindus viewed this development as one of divided loyalties of Indian Muslim population, of pan-Islamic hegemony, and questioned whether Indian Muslims were a part of an inclusive anti-colonial Indian nationalism. The Hindu nationalism ideology that emerged, states Jeffrelot, was codified by Savarkar while he was a political prisoner of the British colonial authorities.

Chris Bayly traces the roots of Hindu nationalism to the Hindu identity and political independence achieved by the Maratha confederacy, that overthrew the Islamic Mughal empire in large parts of India, allowing Hindus the freedom to pursue any of their diverse religious beliefs and restored Hindu holy places such as Varanasi. A few scholars view Hindu mobilisation and consequent nationalism to have emerged in the 19th century as a response to British colonialism by Indian nationalists and neo-Hinduism gurus. Jaffrelot states that the efforts of Christian missionaries and Islamic proselytizers, during the British colonial era, each of whom tried to gain new converts to their own religion, by stereotyping and stigmatising Hindus to an identity of being inferior and superstitious, contributed to Hindus re-asserting their spiritual heritage and counter cross examining Islam and Christianity, forming organisations such as the Hindu Sabhas (Hindu associations), and ultimately a Hindu-identity driven nationalism in the 1920s.

The colonial era Hindu revivalism and mobilisation, along with Hindu nationalism, states Peter van der Veer, was primarily a reaction to and competition with Muslim separatism and Muslim nationalism. The successes of each side fed the fears of the other, leading to the growth of Hindu nationalism and Muslim nationalism in the Indian subcontinent. In the 20th century, the sense of religious nationalism grew in India, states van der Veer, but only Muslim nationalism succeeded with the formation of the West and East Pakistan (later split into Pakistan and Bangladesh), as "an Islamic state" upon independence. Religious riots and social trauma followed as millions of Hindus, Jains, Buddhists and Sikhs moved out of the newly created Islamic states and resettled into the Hindu-majority post-British India. After the separation of India and Pakistan in 1947, the Hindu nationalism movement developed the concept of Hindutva in second half of the 20th century.

The Hindu nationalism movement has sought to reform Indian laws, that critics say attempts to impose Hindu values on India's Islamic minority. Gerald Larson states, for example, that Hindu nationalists have sought a uniform civil code, where all citizens are subject to the same laws, everyone has equal civil rights, and individual rights do not depend on the individual's religion. In contrast, opponents of Hindu nationalists remark that eliminating religious law from India poses a threat to the cultural identity and religious rights of Muslims, and people of Islamic faith have a constitutional right to Islamic shariah-based personal laws.

Hindu nationalism in India, states Katharine Adeney, is a controversial political subject, with no consensus about what it means or implies in terms of the form of government and religious rights of the minorities.

== Demographics ==
Hinduism by country, worldmap (estimate 2010).

There are 1.17 billion Hindus worldwide (14.9% of world's population), with about 95% of them being concentrated in India alone. Along with Christians (31.5%), Muslims (23.2%) and Buddhists (7.1%), Hindus are one of the four major religious groups of the world.

Most Hindus live in Asian countries. The top twenty-five countries with the most Hindu residents and citizens (in decreasing order) are India, Nepal, Bangladesh, Indonesia, Pakistan, Sri Lanka, United States, Malaysia, Myanmar, United Kingdom, Mauritius, South Africa, the Netherlands, France, Russia, United Arab Emirates, Canada, Australia, New Zealand, Italy, Saudi Arabia, Trinidad and Tobago, Singapore, Fiji, Qatar, Kuwait, Guyana, Bhutan, Oman, Suriname and Yemen.

The top fifteen countries with the highest percentage of Hindus (in decreasing order) are Nepal, India, Mauritius, Fiji, Guyana, Bhutan, Suriname, Trinidad and Tobago, Qatar, Sri Lanka, Kuwait, Bangladesh, Réunion, Malaysia, and Singapore.

The fertility rate, that is children per woman, for Hindus is 2.4, which is less than the world average of 2.5. Pew Research projects that there will be 1.4 billion Hindus by 2050.

Hinduism by continents (2017–18)
Continents	Hindus population	% of the Hindu pop	% of the continent pop	Follower dynamics	World dynamics
Asia	1,074,728,901	99.3	26.0	▲ Growing	▲ Growing
Europe	2,030,904	0.2	0.3	▲ Growing	▲ Growing
The Americas	2,806,344	0.3	0.3	▲ Growing	▲ Growing
Africa	2,013,705	0.2	0.2	▲ Growing	▲ Growing
Oceania	791,615	0.1	2.1	▲ Growing	▲ Growing
Cumulative	1,082,371,469	100	15.0	▲ Growing	▲ Growing

Around the 1st and 2nd centuries, Hindu kingdoms arose and spread the religion and traditions across Southeast Asia, particularly Thailand, Nepal, Burma, Malaysia, Indonesia, Cambodia, Laos, Philippines, and what is now central Vietnam.

Over 3 million Hindus live in Bali Indonesia, a culture whose origins trace back to ideas brought by Hindu traders to Indonesian islands in the 1st millennium CE. Their sacred texts are also the Vedas and the Upanishads. The Puranas and the Itihasa (mainly Ramayana and the Mahabharata) are enduring traditions among Indonesian Hindus, expressed in community dances and shadow puppet (wayang) performances. As in India, Indonesian Hindus recognise four paths of spirituality, calling it Catur Marga. Similarly, like Hindus in India, Balinese Hindus believe that there are four proper goals of human life, calling it Catur Purusartha – dharma (pursuit of moral and ethical living), artha (pursuit of wealth and creative activity), kama (pursuit of joy and love) and moksha (pursuit of self-knowledge and liberation).

== Culture ==
Hindu culture is a term used to describe the culture and identity of Hindus and Hinduism, including the historic Vedic people. Hindu culture can be intensively seen in the form of art, architecture, history, diet, clothing, astrology and other forms. The culture of India and Hinduism is deeply influenced and assimilated with each other. With the Indianisation of southeast Asia and Greater India, the culture has also influenced a long region and other religions people of that area. All Indian religions, including Buddhism, Jainism and Sikhism are deeply influenced and soft-powered by Hinduism.

== See also ==
- History of Hinduism
- List of Hindu empires and dynasties
- Hinduism by country
- Hindu eschatology
- List of Hindu festivals
- Hindu calendar
- Suratrana
- Samskaram
- Diksha
- Sanātanī
