= Arya Samaj in Trinidad and Tobago =

AUM or OM is considered by the Arya Samaj to be the highest and most proper name of God.

The earliest efforts to establish the Arya Samaj in Trinidad and Tobago were made by visiting missionaries in the beginning of the 20th century. In the 1930s their activities led to the establishment of a new organisation, which first was called the Arya Samaj Association, but later was renamed Arya Pratinidhi Sabha of Trinidad. The main activity of the sabha was giving support to the construction of Aryan temples and schools. The organisation was frequently plagued by split-offs, which caused a decrease of its membership.

== Early history ==
One of the first Aryan missionaries arriving in Trinidad was Pandit (Note: Pandit means priest in Caribbean Hinduism.) Bhai Parmānand in 1910. Later various other pandits followed him. In 1929, Pandit Mehtā Jaimīnī arrived and encouraged the construction of a building in Marabella where Hindi classes were held. In 1934, Pandit Āyodhyā Prasād arrived, and the local Arya Samaj community was so impressed by him that he was asked to prolong his stay for three years. Prasad performed the shuddhi (conversion) ceremony on many people of other faiths. This is very important, because unlike in Guyana and Suriname many East-Indians in Trinidad had converted to Christianity. Now the people who regretted their decision or the decision of their parents were in the opportunity to return to Hinduism. Consequently, the Ārya Samāj in Trinidad had far more former Christians among its members than the Ārya Samāj in other Caribbean countries. The movement even included a small number of members who were not willing to undergo the shuddhi ceremony and, in fact, remained Christians.

Pandit Āyodhyā Prasād also laid the foundations of the first Aryan temple, the Montrose Mandir in Chaguanas, which was also often called the Vedic Church. The temple was also used as a primary school and since 11 November 1943 as the headquarters of the Arya Samaj Association.

It lasted, however, until December 1943 before the Arya Samaj Association received recognition from the colonial British authorities. Already in January 1937 it was decided to change the name of the organization into Arya Pratinidhi Sabha of Trinidad, which at the moment of governmental recognition in 1943 became the official name. In that year it had ten branches. The Sabha ran nine primary schools in Trinidad.

== Further Developments and Splits ==
A split occurred in the organization In the beginning of 1946. The former president of the Arya Pratinidhi Sabha of Trinidad, R.R. Ojah, and Pandit Bhogi Dass founded a new organization called Vaidika Dharam Pracharak Sabha. Later, when they asked for official recognition with the colonial authorities they changed this name into Vedic Dharam Arya Sabha of Trinidad. The new organization meant a big threat to the Arya Pratinidhi Sabha of Trinidad, but this threat was averted when the government decided to give the three pandits of the Arya Pratinidhi Sabha of Trinidad the right to become official marriage officers. In the 1950s the two leaders of the Vedic Dharam Arya Sabha of Trinidad returned to the Arya Pratinidhi Sabha of Trinidad and Pandit Bhogi Dass became a Marriage Officer as well.

In 1947 Solomon Moosai-Maharaj, who later in the 1950s was himself president of the Arya Pratinidhi Sabha of Trinidad, succeeded in forming a Caribbean Vedic Parishad, a new co-operation body of Aryan umbrella organizations of various countries in the Caribbean. The council convened for the first time in Curepe. During the next years it held a conference every year.

Another split occurred in 1968, when a group of twelve persons including the sabha's former president, Solomon Moosai-Maharaj, founded The Vedic Mission of Trinidad and Tobago with Narine Persad as their first president. The new organization counted many members from Madrasi background. One of its pandits, Moonsammy Gowandan, was also a Madrasi himself. However, after the demise of Solomon Moosai-Maharaj in 1975 the Mission started to wane and in 1985 some members had returned to the Arya Pratinidhi Sabha of Trinidad. The Vedic Mission of Trinidad and Tobago continued on with Pandit Moonsammy Gowandan and Pandit Moonilal Ganpat with weekly services.

During these years the Arya Pratinidhi Sabha was led by Pandit Lakshmidatt Shivaprasad. He organized a Pandit's Training Course and founded a Pandit's Council. Later he also founded a Ladies Council. In 1969 the first female pandit was ordained, almost twenty years later than in Suriname. In 1975, the Arya Virdal was established, an Aryan Youth Organization. Furthermore, Shivaprasad revived the Caribbean Vedic Council in these years. When Shivaprasad trained also some men of lower background to become pandits, there emerged some resistance. Shivaprasad persisted however. In these period the membership was even enriched by some Creoles. But they never visited the meetings and were, in fact, not really accepted.

In 1980 Shivaprasad was replaced by Pandit Harinath Seereeram Maharaj, who put more emphasis on the Brahmanic background of some members in the organization. All these troubles led to a further decrease of the membership.

Both the Arya Pratinidhi Sabha and the Vedic Mission are still existing today. Currently Mr.Roshan Parasramsingh and Ms Vidya Ramachala are the President and Secretary of the Arya Pratinidhi Sabha, while Pandit Hansraj Persad, Pandit Radhay Ramdass and Pandita Lilawatee Baldeo play important roles in the Vedic Mission. The two organizations also participate in the Inter Religious Organization (IRO) of Trinidad & Tobago. The Arya Pratinidhi Sabha of Trinidad is moreover affiliated to the United Hindu Organization and still works in close cooperation with the Ārya Samāj umbrella organizations in Suriname and Guyana.

== Some Observations ==
One reason of the splits was mostly that a former president did not accept his loss in the elections, which are regularly held in the Ārya Samāj, and started a new organization. Another reason was that the Arya Pratinidhi Sabha of Trinidad had the policy to expel pandits who had committed adultery. Often these pandits joined with the opponents of the board and were willing to continue their services in the new organization. The splits were, however, bad for the development of the Ārya Samāj in Trinidad and they are, according to Richard Huntington Forbes, one of the reasons that the number of Ārya Samājīs in Trinidad gradually has diminished.

== Sources ==
Richard Huntington Forbes, Arya Samaj in Trinidad: An Historical Study of Hindu Organizational Process in Acculturative Conditions, Ann Arbor: University Microfilms International 1985.

Vidyalankar, Nardev; Manohar Somera (1975). Arya Samaj and Indians abroad. New Delhi, India: Sarvadeshik Arsfnbaienya Pratinidhi Sabha. pp. 153–156.
