= Hinduism in French Guiana =

Hinduism is a minority religion in French Guiana, introduced and practiced mostly by the Indians in French Guiana, who are approximately 12,000 individuals. As of 2010, Hinduism is followed by 1.6% of the population of French Guiana.

== History ==
The abolition of slavery by France in 1848 created a labour crisis in its three colonies (now overseas departments) in the Caribbean. French Guiana received labourers from Java and India. French Guiana received 19,276 indentured labourers from India.
