= Hinduism in Jamaica =

Hinduism is a minority religion in Jamaica, followed mainly by the Indo-Jamaicans. According to the 2011 census, Hinduism is followed by 0.07% of the population of Jamaica. Sanatan Dharma Mandir in Kingston is the only government-recognised Hindu temple in the country.

== History ==
Hinduism was introduced in Jamaica in 1845 by Indian indentured labourers. In the mid-20th century, there were over 25,000 Hindus in the country. In the following years, some converted to Christianity and some returned to India, leading to a decline in Hindu population. In 1970, the Sanatan Dharma Mandir was constructed on Hagley Park Road in Kingston.

== Demographics ==
According to the 2001 census there are 1453 Hindus in Jamaica, which increased to 1836 in the 2011 census.

Year	Percent	Population
2001	0.06%	1453
2010	0.07%	1836

== Temple ==
The Sanatan Hindu Temple is the only Hindu temple recognised by the Jamaican Government. It was built in mid 1970s by Pandit Munaeshwar Maragh at 114B Hagley Park Road. Today it stands as a place of worship and all major Hinduism festivals are celebrated here.

== Contemporary Status ==
A major issue for Hinduism in Jamaica is the lack of priests. In 2017, Nathan Pandit — who was believed to be the only Hindu priest in Jamaica — was murdered under mysterious circumstances.

== See also ==
- Hinduism in Guyana
- Hinduism in Panama
- Hinduism in Reunion
