= Sanatan Dharma =

Modern endonymic designation for Hinduism

Sanatan Dharma (Note: Sanskrit: सनातन धर्म, romanized: Sanātana Dharma) (also Sanatanism) is a modern term used as a synonym for Hinduism. The term, meaning "eternal dharma," emerged as an endonymic designation for the religious traditions collectively identified by the exonym "Hinduism". It gained broader currency during the 19th century, particularly in the context of Hindu religious reform. A follower of the Sanatan Dharma is referred to as a Sanatani.

== Etymology ==
The term is found in Sanskrit and other Indian languages. In Sanskrit, Sanātana Dharma translates approximately to "eternal law" or, less literally, "eternal way." In Pali, the equivalent term is Dhammo Sanātano (धम्मो सनन्तनो).

Dharma is often translated as "duty" but has a deeper meaning. The word comes from the Sanskrit root "dhṛ" (धृ) which means "to sustain" or "that which is integral to something" (e.g., dharma of sugar is to be sweet, fire to be hot). Sanatan-dharma – duties performed according to one's spiritual (constitutional) identity as atman (Self) and are thus the same for everyone. General duties include virtues such as honesty, refraining from injuring living beings, purity, goodwill, mercy, patience, forbearance, self-restraint, generosity, and asceticism.

== History ==
The phrase dharma sanātana occurs in classical Sanskrit literature, for example, in the Manusmriti (4-138) (c. 1st – 3rd century CE) and in the Bhagavata Purana (c. 8th – 10th century CE). The phrase dharmāni sanatā is mentioned in the classical Sanskrit literature Rigveda (3.3.1) (c. 1500 – 1000 BCE), which means "eternal duties". In the Atharvaveda (10.8.22) (c. 1200 – 900 BCE), the Supreme Being is called Sanātanam (eternal), and that Sanātanam God is worshipped.

In the late 19th century, the term was revived during the Hindu revivalism movement as a name for Hinduism as a religion in order to avoid having to use the exonym "Hindu" which is of non-native Persian origin. The term denotes the "eternal" or absolute set of duties or religiously ordained practices incumbent upon all Hindus, regardless of class, caste, or sect. Many Hindus in the Indian subcontinent call themselves Sanatanis, that is, those who follow the 'eternal dharma', to evoke a certain homogeneity in Hinduism. Its use to signify Hinduism as a religion was popularised since the 19th century by champions of Hindu orthodoxy such as Pandit Shraddha Ram in reaction to missionaries and Hindu reformers such as Arya Samaj and Brahmo Samaj. Aside from its use in socio-religious contexts, it also sustains a political necessity for many Hindus.

Today, Sanatan Dharma is used as a synonym for Hinduism. In current-day usage, the term Sanatan Dharma is sometimes used to emphasize a "traditional” or sanatani ("eternalist") outlook in contrast to the socio-political Hinduism embraced by movements such as the Arya Samaj.

Reformists such as the Arya Samaj, the Radha Soamis and the Ramakrishna Mission have competed for adherents for more than a century, sometimes creating deep schisms in Hindu society, as in the case of South African Hindus who were split between the Arya Samaj and Sanatanis. While the reformist groups were better organized initially, by the 1860s, a process of internal counter-reform was underway in Sanatani groups as well, and societies to propagate orthodox beliefs along modern lines emerged, such as Sanatan Dharma Rakshini Sabha in 1873.

Historian Vasudha Dalmia examined the formation of modern Hinduism, comparing Dayanand Saraswati's Satyarth Prakash Annie Besant and Bhagavan Das 1903 publication Sanātana Dharma: An Elementary Textbook of Hindu Religion and Ethics, concluding that "the new mode was one of claiming overarching validity for a singular belief system by subsuming difference, without engaging with the other forms".

== Bibliography ==
- Knott, Kim (1998). Hinduism: A Very Short Introduction. Oxford University Press. ISBN 978-0-19-160645-8.
- Hatcher, Brian A. (2015), Hinduism in the Modern World, Routledge, ISBN 978-1-135-04631-6
- Harvey, Andrew (2001). Teachings of the Hindu Mystics. Shambhala. ISBN 978-1-57062-449-0.
- Bowker, John (2000). The Concise Oxford Dictionary of World Religions. Oxford University Press. ISBN 978-0-19-280094-7.
- Kurtz, Lester R. (2007), Gods in the global village: the world's religions in sociological perspective, Pine Forge Press, 2007, p. 49, ISBN 978-1-4129-2715-4
- Parpola, Asko (2015). The Roots of Hinduism. The Early Aryans and the Indus Civilization. Oxford University Press. ISBN 978-0-19-022693-0.
