= Karakattam =

Type of dance

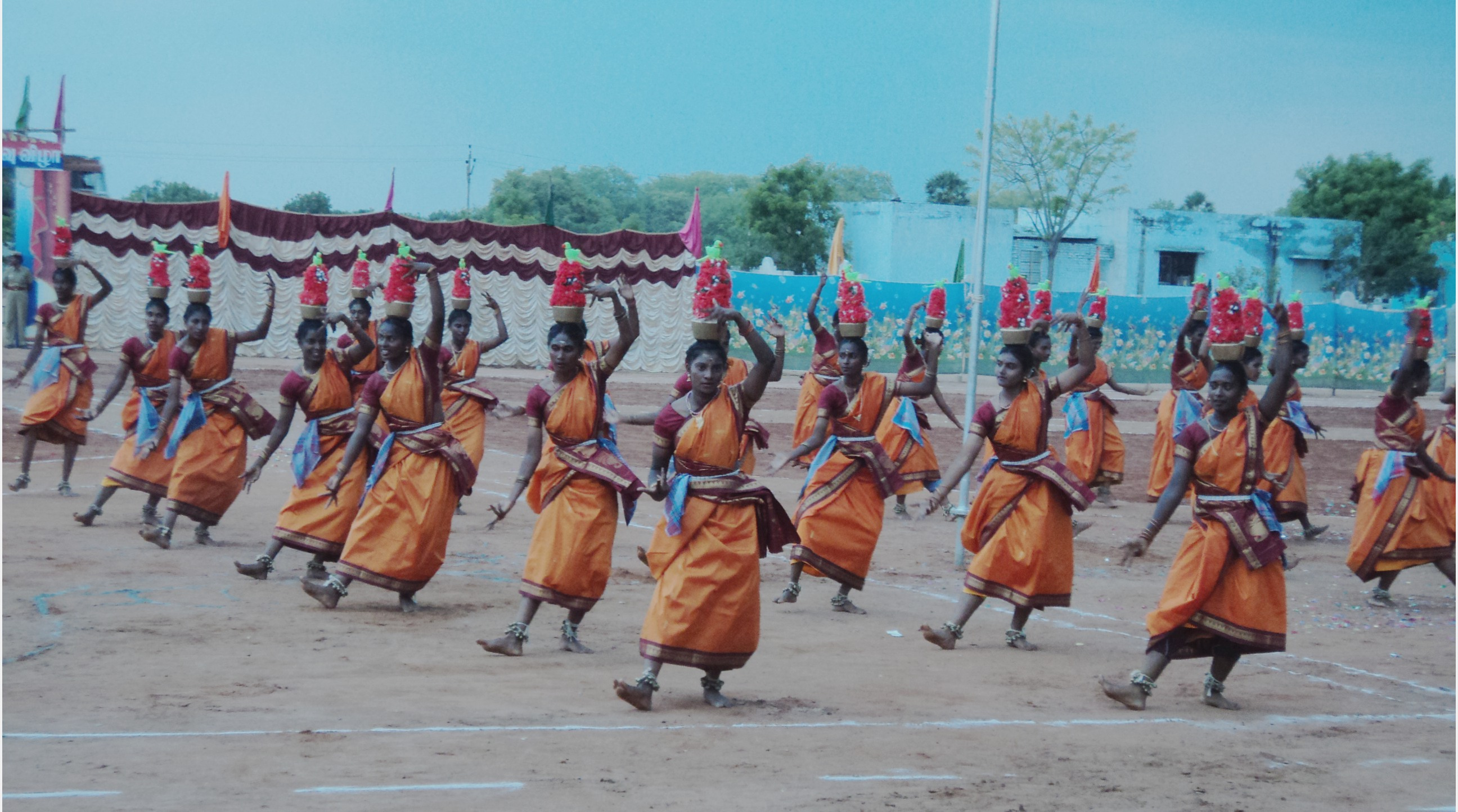
- Dancers performing karakattam
- Etymology: Combination of the Tamil words karakram (water pot), and attam (dance)
- Genre: Tamil folk dance
- Origin: Tamil Nadu, India

Karakattam is an ancient folk dance of Tamil Nadu usually dedicated to goddess Mariamman. As per Tamil literature, the dance form originated from a mix of Bharatham and other folk dance forms. It was often performed in festivals and fairs, and used as a means to pray for rain. Different variations of the dance form exists, including Karagam Puja, performed in the Caribbean.

== Description ==
Karakattam is an ancient folk dance of Tamil Nadu which involves balancing clay or metal pot(s) on the head while making movements with the body. It is derived from the combination of the Tamil words karakram (water pot), and attam (dance). This dance is usually associated with the worship of Mariamman and played in festivals and fairs, and to pray for rain. As per Tamil literature, the dance form originated from a mix of Bharatham and other folk dance forms.

== Performance ==
The dancers balance pots on the head while making various movements with the hands and body. The pots may be empty or sometimes filled with water and are decorated with colorful flowers and leaves mostly neem, which is of medicinal and religious importance to the Tamils. The performer may sometimes carry multiple pots layered on top of one another. The art form was traditionally practiced by women, who wore saris. Men wearing make-up may join them sometimes as a part of the story line. In the 21st century, the dance has been subjected to significant changes. It has sometimes obtained a reputation for vulgarity with women wearing short skirts, showing of their midriff and bright make-up.

== Variations ==
Different variations of the dance form exist. Sakthi Karakam is performed only in temples as a spiritual offering. Aatta Karakam symbolizes joy and happiness, and is mainly performed as entertainment.

In Caribbean Shaktism, a tradition found among the Indo-Caribbeans of Tamil origin, Karakattam is known as Karagam Puja or Kalasa Puja. The tradition was brought by the Girmityas, indentured servants from the Indian subcontinent. The practice takes place over three consecutive days and done as a dedication to the gods Kamakshi and Meenakshi. The festival also involves honouring other gods such as a puja for Mariamman before the procession, a river procession where offerings on a board are thrown into water as a tribute to Ganga Amman, and Kaateri Maa.

The pujaris (priests) enter a trance state and honour the village gods Sangili Karuppu and Madurai Veeran through processions with various stunts such as whipping, putting hot camphor inside the mouth, and walking on hot coals before running to a pool made of milk. Other stunts can include piercing of the tongues and cheeks, dancing on sharpened machetes, and animal sacrifices are also made. The lotas are kept in the temple and consecrated accordingly, before being built with a coconut, several layers of neem and oleander flowers. Three participants enter the Sami Aduthal stage and then two of them carry the Karagams (usually these two participants being boys before hitting puberty or women), and the other one receives the god Madurai Veeran and is dressed with a garland of oleander flowers and carries a staff topped with neem leaves.

== In popular culture ==
Various Tamil films such as Karakattakkaran (1989), which featured a song "Maanguyilae Poonguyile" based on the dance form, and Padai Veetu Amman (2001) and Sri Bannari Amman (2002) showcase karakattam.
