= Village deities of South India =

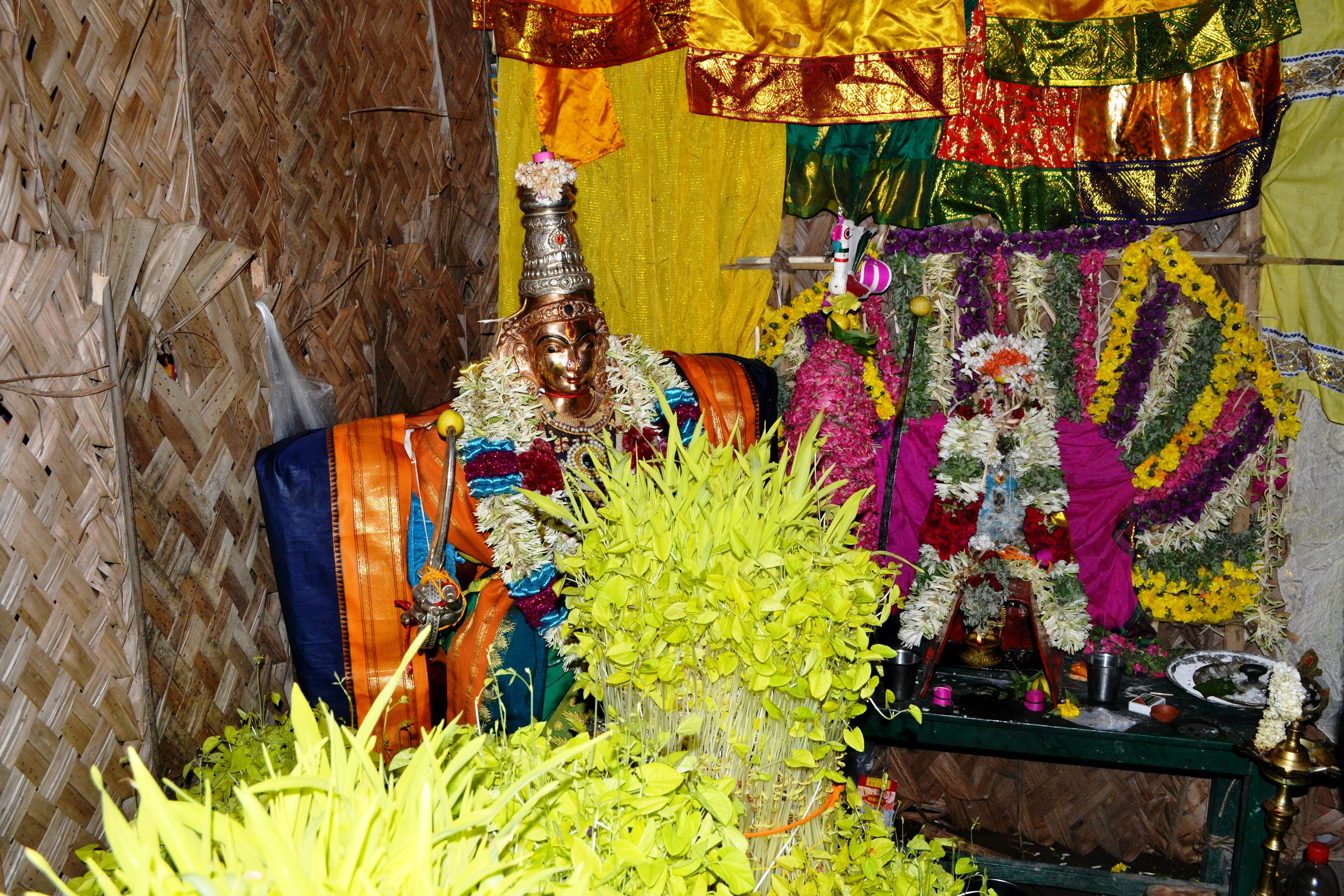
Mariamman during a festival near Madurai

The village deities of Southern India are the numerous spirits and other beings venerated as part of the Dravidian folk tradition in villages throughout South India. These deities, mainly goddesses, are intimately associated with the well-being of the village, and can have either benevolent or violent tendencies. These deities are presently in various stages of syncretism or assimilation with mainstream Hindu traditions.

These deities have been linked back to common Indus Valley civilisation imagery, and are hypothesised to represent the prevailing Dravidian folk religion at the time. The worship of these deities at many times do not conform to the common tenets of Vedic traditions, especially in customs of animal sacrifice, the inclusion of the priesthood class, and iconography; yet at the same time it is difficult to completely extricate Vedic traditions from the worship.

== Origins and history ==
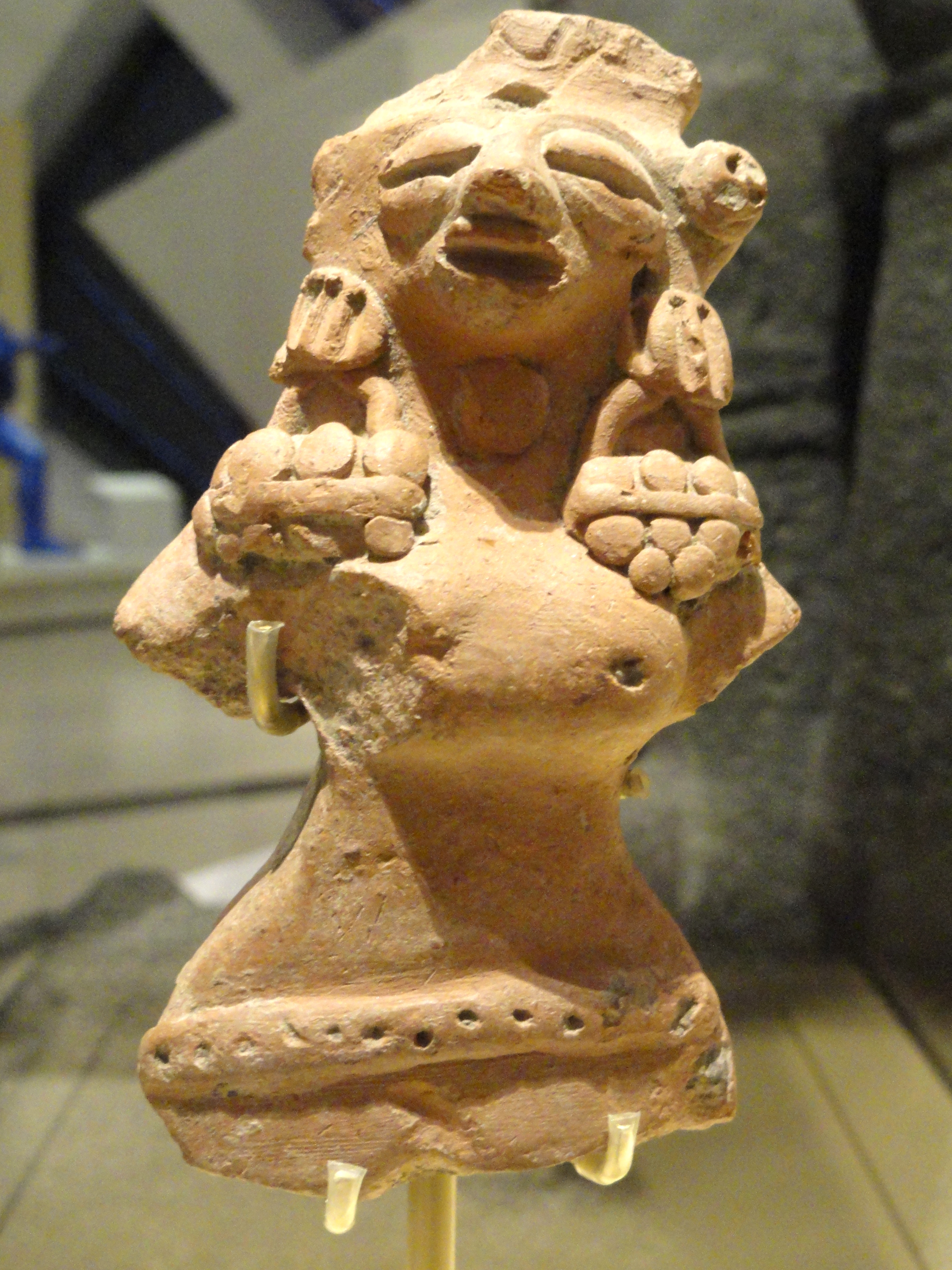
Female figure, possibly fertility goddess, from the Indus Valley civilization.

Generally the traditions of village deity tradition or Grama Devta tradition predate the arrival of Indo-Aryans. The earliest evidence found in the Indus Valley Civilization were Mother Goddesses associated with fertility and motherhood there the mother goddess tradition survived as Grama Devta. This tradition in South India existed much before the arrival of Buddhism, Jainism and Historical Vedic religion. Whereas the male deities such as Ayyanar, Karuppasamy, Muniswara, Pothuraju are the deceased warriors who are worshipped as guardians of villages before the arrival of Indo-Aryans, the mother goddesses were represented as small terracotta figures and the male deities were represented as stones and horse totems.

== Types ==
There are two main types of deity propitiated in a village. Any of these deities can be considered a kuladevata.

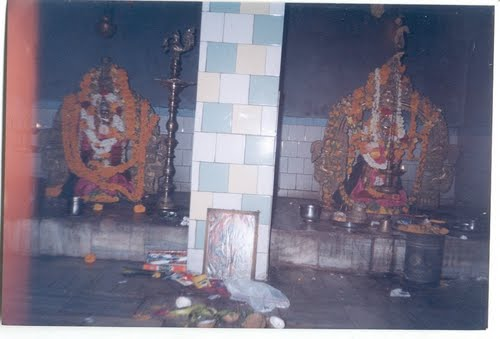
Example of a fertility goddess, Chikkamma Doddamma, common in South Karnataka

Most villages traditionally have a fertility goddess. This goddess is believed to arise from the natural world itself, and to be intrinsically linked to the ground of the village. She is a representation of the village itself, rather than simply a guardian figure. Sometimes her head is represented in a carving at the center of the village, while the rest of the village is considered her body. She often has the additional responsibility of overseeing rain, since, in the areas of South India east of the Western Ghats, the monsoon rains are the primary source of water for agriculture. She is the main protector of the village, especially against common diseases like smallpox or plague. Other goddesses preside over specific household objects, or act as guardians of cattle or children. Most of these deities are unique to their village and have their own origin stories, and many are worshipped only by members of a particular community. Mariamman is one of the most popular of this class of deity, worshipped throughout South India. She provides fertility and, in many places, protection against smallpox and other deadly diseases. Other popular goddesses include Pochamma in Telugu regions and Yellamma in northern Karnataka and western Telangana. Another common theme is the seven sisters, called saptamatrikas in Vedic traditions. This collection of goddesses does not have a specific function, but may be called upon if a disease is affecting the family. In the area around Tirumala, it is said that these deities can be seen as young girls wandering around at noon, dusk or night. Village goddesses can have different personalities. Some are kindly, and will shower blessings on those who worship them. Others are vengeful and angry, and will unleash terror on the village unless they are propitiated. Many of these deities are especially worshipped by one particular community, for example Yellamma is worshipped especially by two Dalit communities: Malas and Madigas. Some of these deities originated with tribal communities and became worshipped by wider society., such as Kondalamma in the hills of East Godavari district.

Villages, especially in Tamil and Telugu regions, also have a guardian deity: a male deity who protects the village from harm like war or famine or other evils. Unlike the fertility goddess, this deity is worshipped throughout a wide region and has less variety. In Tamil Nadu he is known as Shasta/Ayyanar. His name in Telugu is Poturaju and is the brother of the presiding goddess in those villages. A common origin myth for Poturaju is that he drank the blood of demons slain by amma. In Tamil Nadu, there are a host of other male deities, such as Karuppusami, who are either attendants to Ayyanar or guardians for the main goddess. Most of these gods are kuladevatas for families in the village, especially for dominant castes who are patrilineal. In this context guardianship has two meanings: either as guardian of devotees or the guardian of a greater village deity, subservient to them.

== Mythology ==
The mythology surrounding these deities varies considerably by region and deity. However several basic trends can be established. For instance, most village deities are rooted in the idea that some form of Shakti is the primordial force in the universe, sometimes called Adi Shakti or Adi Mahashakti. From her arose all other deities, including the Trimurti of Vedic traditions. The village goddesses are usually related as avatars of Adi Shakti. Each deity will have an origin story of some kind to explain why they do not appear in the Puranas. An example of this is Ayyanar, whose origin story in the Arcot region is related to the story of Padmasuran (also known as Bhasmasura), who was given a boon by Shiva to turn anyone whose head he touched into ash. But Padmasuran attacked Shiva himself, who became frightened turned into an aivelangai fruit. However, Shiva's brother-in-law (In Tamil tradition, Vishnu is often considered Parvati's brother), Vishnu, heard his plea for help and appeared as Mohini. Entrancing the Asura, Mohini said he had to take a bath in order to be hers. The Asura could only find a small amount of water and put it on his head, after which he burst into ashes. Vishnu then told Shiva all was clear and after being told the tale, Shiva wished to see Vishnu as Mohini. When he obliged, Shiva became aroused and his semen came out. To prevent it from touching the ground Vishnu caught it in his hand, and Ayyanar was born. This invention of tradition is a way to explain why these deities do not appear in the Puranic stories and to give them a sense of "legitimacy" in the greater tradition. Another myth from that same region about the origin of another popular deity, Muneeshwarar, claims he was created by Shiva.

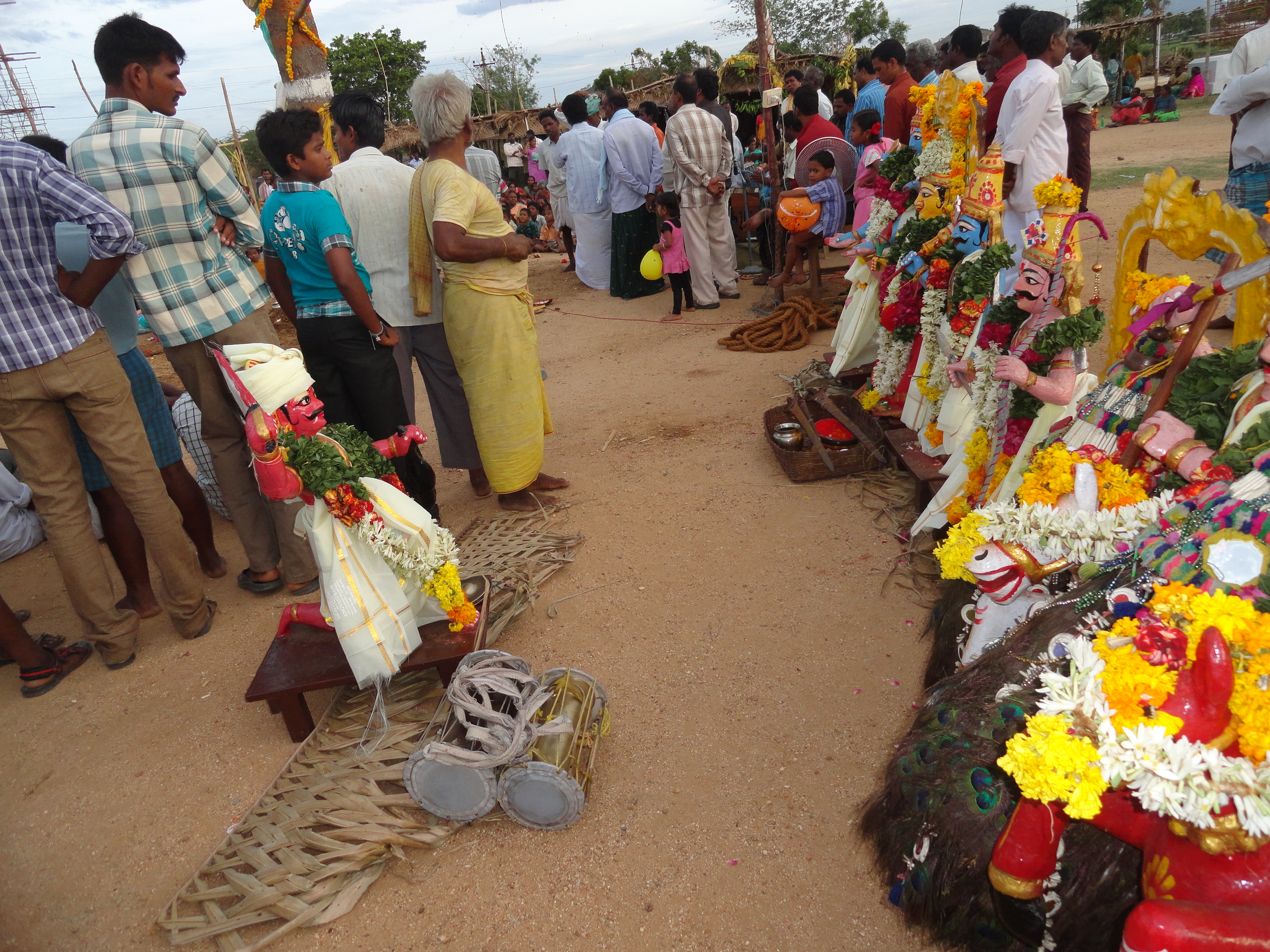
Poturaju standing in front of statues of the Pandavas in a village of Chittoor district, Andhra Pradesh

Occasionally, the fertility goddess or guardian deity can be the spirit of a historical figure. This practice has roots in ancient times: as early as the Sangam period, hero stones (natukal/viragal in Tamil, veeragalu in Kannada), stones erected to honour those men who laid down their lives for the village, were worshipped and propitiated. Similar to hero stones, sati stones honour women who sacrificed their life, especially for chastity and purity. The early Tamil poem Tolkappiyam gives a six-stage guide to the erection of such a stone, from selection of a suitable stone until the institution of formal worship. In time, many of these spirits have merged into or become the local guardian deity. Examples of deified heroes include Madurai Veeran/Karuppasamy/Sudalai Madan from Southern Tamilnadu (Lit: Madurai and Thirunelveli) and Kathavarayan (from Thanjavur). Oftentimes, these heroes are found as attendants to Ayyanar or a village goddess, especially in Tamil Nadu. The Paanchamman temples in north Tamil Nadu were built to worship widows who underwent Sati. Often, the deities are spirits who suffered injustice in their lives or deaths and must be propitiated to prevent their spirit from affecting the village. Several couples who have lost their lives due to caste animosity are worshipped as deities in several villages. Kannaki Amman is Kannagi from the Silappadikaram, whose husband was unjustly killed by the Pandyan king, is another widely-worshipped deity of this category. The Machani Amman temple at Pollachi was built to worship a young girl who was killed by a Kongu king for unknowingly eating a mango from his garden. Oftentimes female spirits are merged into the main fertility goddess, or are venerated as one of her attendants.

Some few deities are less-venerated characters in the epics of the Ramayana and Mahabharata. For example, there are many temples dedicated to Draupadiamman (Panchali) and Dharmaraja (Yudhishthira) in northern Tamil Nadu, a tradition especially prominent among the Vanniyar community. Temples dedicated to Gandhari (mother of the Kauravas), Kunti (mother of Pandavas) and Aravan (the son of Arjuna and the serpent princess Ulupi) are also found in Tamil Nadu. For these deities, legitimizing mythologies exist in the forms of the Ramayana and Mahabharata.

== Representation ==
=== Placement ===
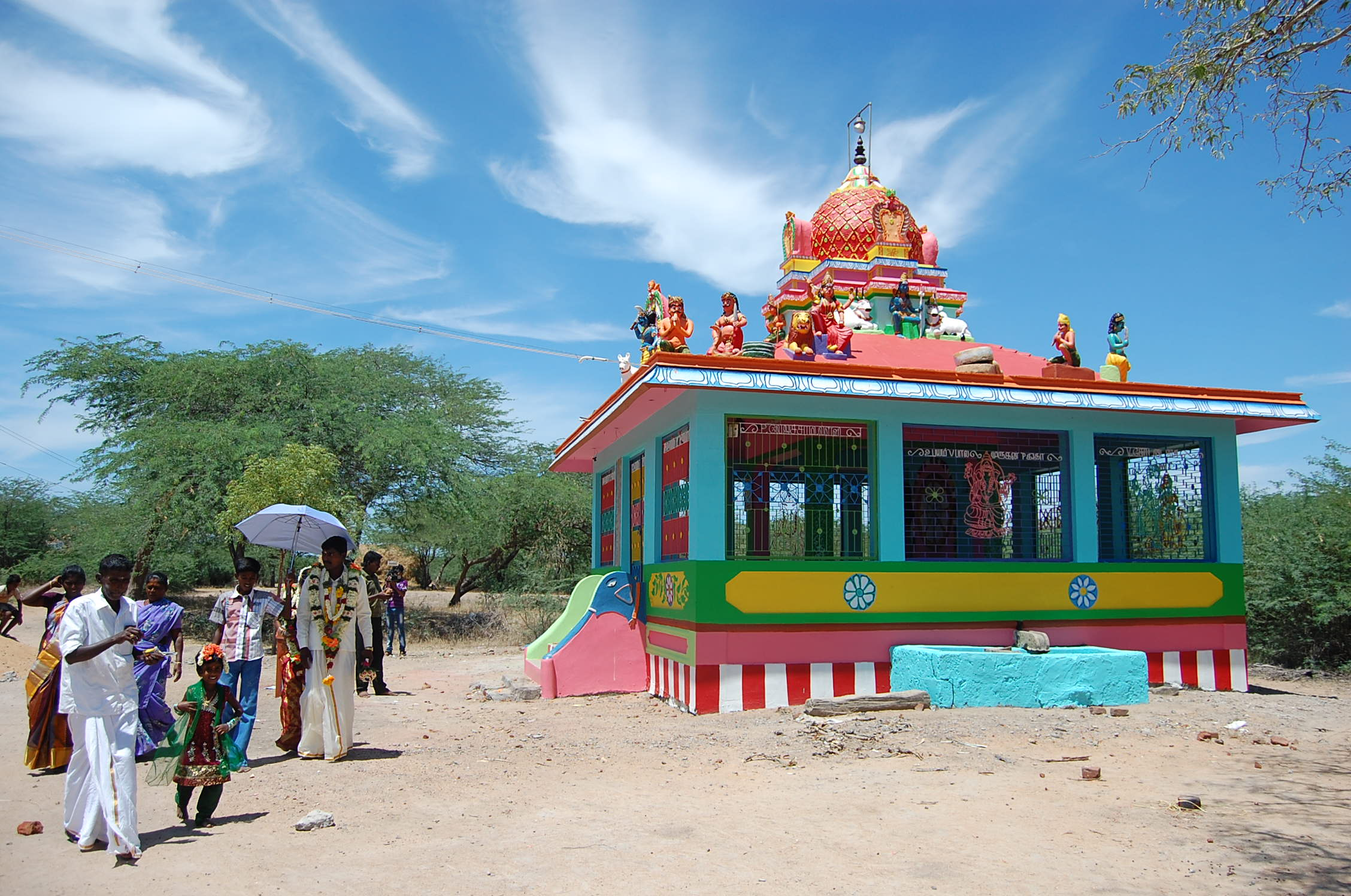
A typical Amman temple on the outskirts of the village, Tamil Nadu

The place and way in which a deity is represented is symbolic of their role in society. The placement of the deity is also a reflection of the influence it is believed to have on the people. The more beneficial village goddesses are to be found in the main village, called the ur in Tamil and Telugu, in various locations. The more malevolent deities are usually given more space on the village outskirts, nearer to settlements variously known as keri, palli or cheri in Kannada, Telugu and Tamil respectively. These locations are reserved for the lowest castes, mainly Dalits, but also communities like washermen and barbers. These fierce deities are avoided as much as possible, and their placement is characteristic of traditional views of who was most "orderly." However, there are some exceptions. In Tamil Nadu, the guardian god is given a space along the village boundaries to protect them from harm although he himself is not seen as harmful.

The shrines themselves vary by deity and region. For Tamils, Ayyanar is represented in an open space to better fulfill his duty. However there the goddess is given her own temple similar in form, and sometimes size, to a Vedic temple. In other regions, however, the goddess (since gods are less venerated in these areas) may be given a shrine at the edge of the village, although it is common to find the shrine next to a tree or a snake-hole. In Telugu regions, the deity sometimes has no permanent shrine, but a temporary pandal. Some goddesses wish to be in the open space to feel the same hardships as their devotees. Yet there is no distinction between the dwelling-place of the deity and the deity: the dwelling-place itself is a form of the deity.

=== Iconography ===
The deities themselves are often represented as aniconic, either as a shapeless stone or tree or snake-hole. In Tamil Nadu, the guardian god is often given form as a fierce warrior, holding an aruval or other weapon, with attendants surrounding him. However Poturaju in Telugu areas is typically represented only by a stick in the ground. In Telugu and Kannada regions, the goddess is often given anthropomorphic form as a terracotta statue only during a temple festival, and is then returned to her aniconic shape. In many villages in Tamil Nadu, a village god is represented by planting spears or trishulas in the ground to represent his martial prowess. In the village of Kogilu near Bengaluru, the goddesses were represented by items such as a lamp or a stone pillar. In many areas of South Karnataka, the village goddess is symbolized by an aarti, a lamp made of rice flour shaped like a cone and adorned with kumkuma in the shape of a face. All these icons are believed to be the deity itself, rather than simply a vessel to hold it.

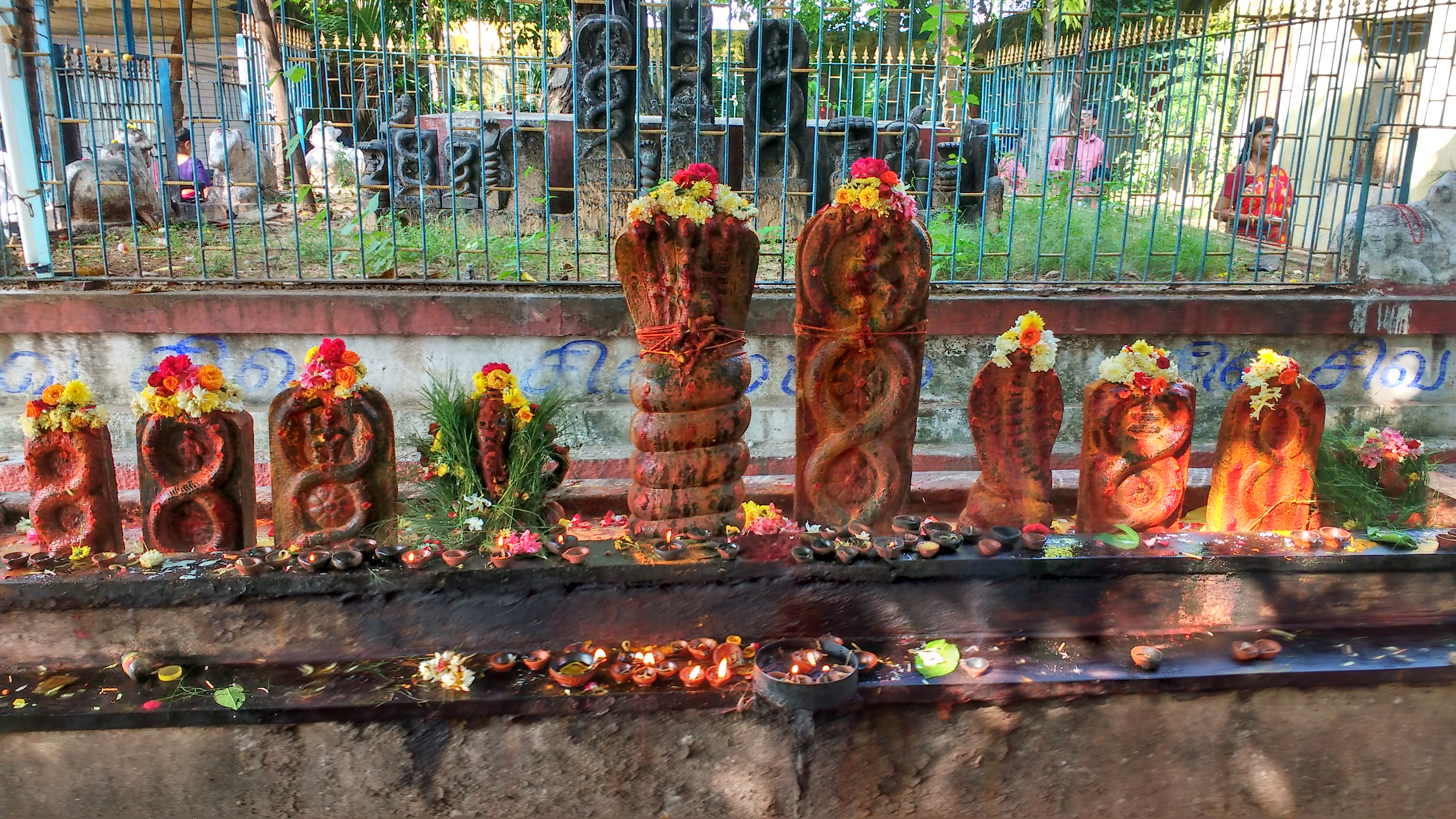
Examples of Naga statues in Tamil Nadu

Another common symbol is the snake, or naga. Usually they are carved onto stone pillars, either in the shape of a hooded cobra (like Adishesha) or as two snakes intertwined. The snake is symbolic of the earth's fertility, since they are only visible after the monsoon, and as a punisher of those who oppose the goddess. Worship of these specific qualities is done in Kerala, especially by non-Vedic castes such as the Nairs.

== Worship ==
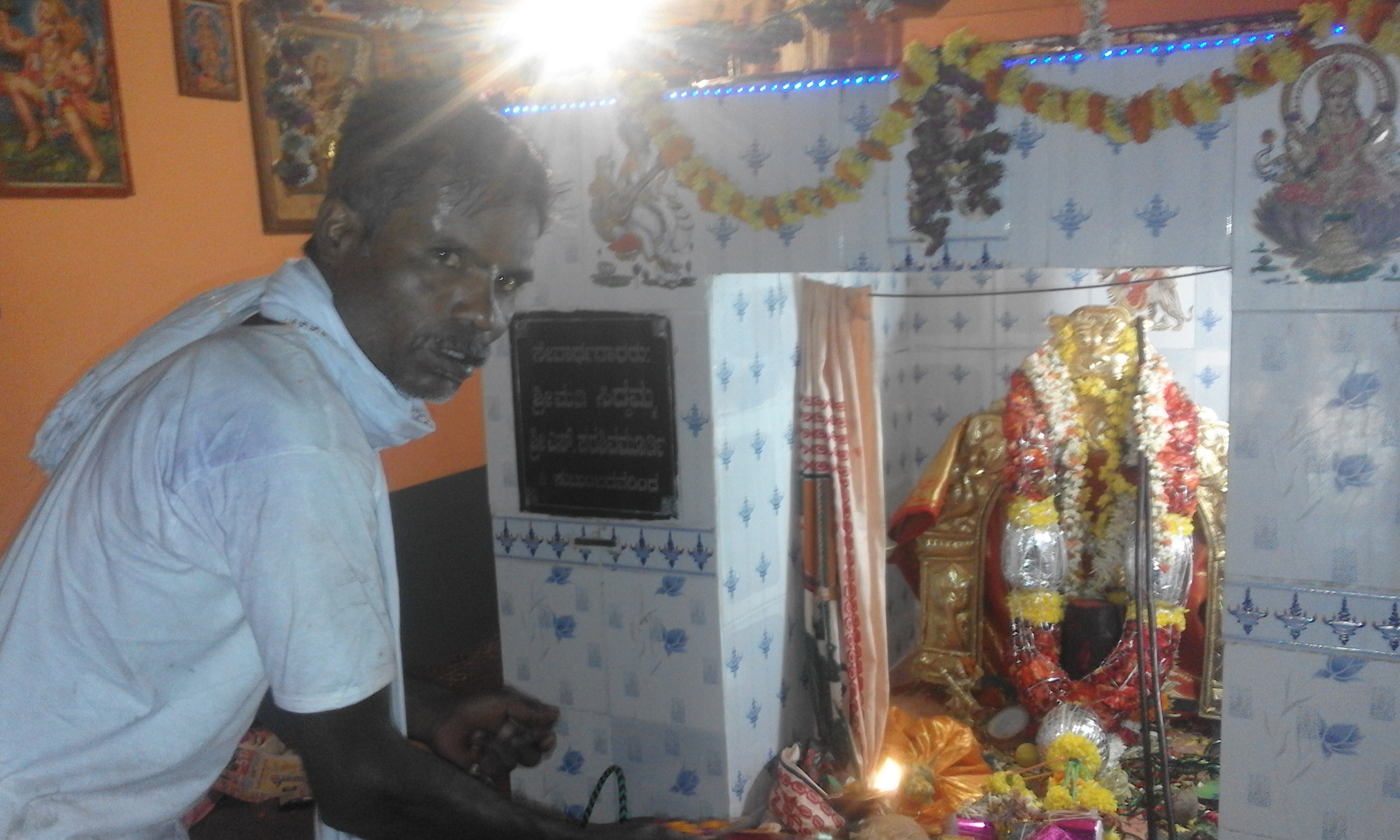
Man doing worship to Maaramma in Mandya district

There are a huge diversity of worship practices for these deities, oftentimes depending on the deity's nature and other local customs. However, some general characteristics of worship include local language and, most of the time, non-Brahmin priests.

The worship itself is not done in a language such as Sanskrit, but in the local language. This worship is usually done through oral tales, telling the origin of the goddess. In Tamil Nadu there are several genres of this form such as terukoothu, a form of street folk theatre, villu pattu (lit. "bow song"), extolling the deeds of great heroes who had been deified, and udukkai pattu, legends done to the sound of percussion. In northern Tamil Nadu these are all subsumed under the world of aideegam.

=== Sacrifice ===
Depending on the temper of the deity, they may be offered animal sacrifices or vegetarian offerings. In Tamil Nadu, it is a goat or chicken that is killed, and depends on the number of families that contribute. In Karnataka, Andhra Pradesh and Telangana, it was once a buffalo that was sacrificed. However, with more Vedic influence due to Hindutva and other factors, the sacrifice has been made a goat or sheep. The actual killing of the animal is done by any non-Brahmin community, but the buffalo was usually killed by one of the Dalit communities: especially the Madigas. This was because the Madigas, whose traditional occupation was leather craftsmanship, would not be "tainted" by the killing and would use the remains of the buffalo for their food and leather.

The sacrifice takes place near the end of the village festival. The animal is doused with water, and if it shivers, it is deemed to be possessed by the deity. Then, the animal is led to the shrine, and is restrained. One man takes an aruval or other sword and beheads the animal, which is then tossed aside to twitch and bleed out. For fowl, the head can be ripped off or the neck be broken without the use of a weapon. The head itself is placed in front of the deity with a foreleg in its mouth. It is believed that in this position the animal represents a demon, and by giving the demon to the deity it will be able to unite with her and become one again. Thus the villagers have done their duty. The meat is then taken and is used to make a prasada, which is then offered to the deity. Afterwards, it is eaten by the devotees. It was usually the Dalits who got the meat from the buffalo sacrifice since only they would eat buffalo meat. At other times, however, anyone can walk up to the deity and make a sacrifice to them, potentially to ease some personal trouble such as a sick child or obtaining bad luck. The Muthumariamman temple in the Nilgiris was once the place where people swore solemn vows. This was sometimes used by the judicial system in the region during British times, and it was common for witnesses to make a vow of truth and make a sacrifice to Muthumariamman in the presence of a court official, so that all would know they spoke the truth.

=== Festivals ===
Festivals for village deities vary widely and can be done at various times. In southern Tamil Nadu, for instance, most deity festivals take place throughout the dry summer months before the monsoon. For most deities, the festival is only celebrated by those with a close connection to the deity: e.g. those for whom the deity is their kuladevata, caste deity or deity of their locality. Financing of these festivals is generally done via a tax on all members of that deity's "celebratory group." However for village deities, such as the local amman goddess, the festival is celebrated by the entirety of the village in one way or another.

Oftentimes someone, usually from one of the Dalit communities, is possessed by the goddess, and devotees can ask her questions and sometimes criticize her.

Another characteristic is the timing of festivals. Village festivals are often celebrated for the first sowing or harvest, but often festivals will be called at unknown time. If there is a pestilent disease spreading in the area, the villagers, who see the deity as the controller of those diseases, will organize a festival to please or appease their deity.

In most villages the locally dominant castes would sponsor the village festival. For these festivals, each community performs a function similar to their traditional occupation: i.e. washermen provide cloths, acharis provide ladles for serving prasada, each with a specified remuneration such as cash, land or share of the offerings. Others who are not involved in the setting up of the festival are encouraged to bring various offerings including goats and fowls for sacrifice. However all receive some of the good of pleasing the goddess. These festivals usually last one to two weeks and are chiefly marked by processions through the village. However Mines notes that these processions also mark the boundary between the ur, or village and kadu, or wilderness. These boundaries are subject to change depending on socioeconomic circumstances of residents of various areas in the village.

In Telugu regions, the festival begins with a beating of drums announcing the festival. Then the village elders along with the pujari arrive at the snake-hole and offer milk and eggs. They then tie two sticks together in front of the hole, a symbolic invitation of the goddess to arrive for the festival. The next day priests and village elders return to the snake hole. Two of the elders carry ghata, pots decorated with various patterns and topped with an oil lamp. The one representing the goddess is covered with turmeric and kumkuma and draped with garlands of flowers. The priest carries a basket of cooked rice and lentils which represents the goddess. This food is offered to the snakes, and some soil from the hole, called putta bangaram ("golden soil"), is taken to symbolize the goddess' presence. The pots are then placed at the centre of the village next to a peepal tree or a specially-built pandal. There the pot is kept along with the putta bangaram and worshipped throughout the rest of the festival. Over the next few days other ghata are taken around the village and households give gifts of rice and food and then brought back to the village centre, and occasionally a ram or boar is sacrificed. The villagers then perform many entertainments such as dances, dramas and others for the enjoyment of the goddess. On the seventh night is the pathana, where farmers bring agricultural produce to be blessed by the goddess. The final day is the next day and is called toliyeru, the tilling of the soil. Farmers, including the village headman, take their plows and plow the ground in front of the goddess to gain her blessing. The next morning is the anupu or anupukam (send-off), where a special anthropomorphic image made of either wood or stone is offered. In the evening the pot and putta bangaram are taken around the village accompanied by a man playing Poturaju. Poturaju holds a rope and it is believed that those who are thrashed by him will have good luck. Then a female ganachari, one possessed by the goddess, joins the procession generally in a state of unkemptness. Village elders then ask her whether there will be a good year ahead and the harvest will be bountiful. Finally the procession reaches the shrine of the goddess, where the animals are sacrificed. Their blood is then mixed with rice in a toddy pot to scare away evil spirits. Finally the wooden or clay image is led out of the village, sometimes to be placed in a tank where it will disintegrate.

Similar procedures are followed in Karnataka, where the possession is an important aspect. The goddess will advise her devotees just like a mother or close friend.

== Relationship with Vedic Hinduism ==
The Vedic and non-Vedic people assimilated from each other. Even though there are diversified characteristics between the Vedic and the folk traditions, various communities inducted these deities in their spectrum and created various sthalapuranas which emphasized the relation between these gods and goddesses from differing traditions. Often the Vedic deities were invoked to "legitimize" the lineage of the deity. In northern Tamil Nadu for instance, For example, a male deity called Kuttandavar is worshipped in many parts of Tamil Nadu, especially in the former South Arcot district. The image consists of a head like a big mask with a fierce face and lion's teeth projecting downwards outside the mouth. According to legend the creation of Kuttandavar, the god Indra, is for the crime of murdering a Brahmin, became incarnated in the form of Kuttandavar, and a curse was laid upon him that his body leaving only the head. Another story, from Chittoor district in Andhra Pradesh, is about Gangamma, the daughter of a Brahmin who unknowingly married a Dalit. This Dalit had claimed Brahmin status in order to learn the Vedas from Gangamma's father but was unknowingly exposed by his mother who had visited. Ganga, distraught at being "polluted", burned herself to death, and her angry spirit cursed her husband and his mother to be reborn as a goat and sheep respectively, and to be sacrificed to her for all eternity. A similar myth was recorded in Kurnool district in the early 20th century for a goddess there. This myth, by vilifying the Dalits as nothing more than animals and portraying the Brahmins as innocent victims, is meant to show the "disastrous consequences" of transgressing one's caste and upholding caste boundaries.

Vedic deities and local village deities exist on multiple spectra, one of which is the Vedic idea of purity and pollution. However, the most important contrast is the spectrum ranging from "soft" to "fierce." The "softest" deities are the Vedic deities: Vishnu, Shiva, and others, who are worshipped via vegetarian offerings solely. The fiercest deities are worshipped only through offerings of meat and alcohol, both considered "polluting" in Vedic scriptures. These are also the deities most commonly worshipped by Dalit communities, who often offer buffalos in Telugu and Kannada regions. Typically, the Vedic deities, although revered are seen as "big deities", concerned with the wider universe and not with the common man. The village deities, on the other hand, are accessible and are more concerned with the day-to-day woes of the villagers. Therefore, in times of need, it is the village deities that are turned to rather than the major Vedic deities. Therefore, their temples are usually maintained by donations from the people of the village and are in good condition, while Vedic temples are either administered by the government or often neglected due to lack of worship.

Many deities have made the transition from being independent folk deities worshipped with traditional rites to being assimilated as an avatara of one of the Vedic deities: it is believed that many of the most popular, such as Shiva, had non-Vedic origins. This often happens when a Vedic goddess (some form of Kali, Durga or Parvati usually) gains significant popularity and then all the gramadevatas are conflated with her. This process has resulted in many gramadevatas in the region around Hyderabad to be seen as avatars of Kali. Another way for the deities to make a transition is for a deity to gain significant popularity, thus ensuring they must be "legitimized." For instance, an army mason from Secunderabad became a devotee of Ujjain Mahankali and built a temporary temple for her. As the deity became more popular, she eventually got a permanent temple administered by his son and later a temple committee. During excavation they found an image of Manikyamba and installed it. They hired a Brahmin priest, and the Vedic chandi homam was done occasionally to ensure she became a Vedic deity who is largely peaceful. However she is also worshipped as a Neem tree in the temple courtyard and animal sacrifice is occasionally performed to her, showing her origin as a village deity. In addition, Yellamma is also worshipped here as a dasi (servant) of Mahankali, mirroring the relationship between Matangi and Yellamma. Yellamma, being a very popular goddess around Hyderabad, attracts many to the temple.

== Assimilation ==
These transitions are primarily driven by a desire to assimilate into the dominant culture due to increased affluence. Because the Vedic religion is the "high" culture, when many from non-Vedic castes gain in affluence and status, they start to distance themselves from the "fierce" origins of their deities and assimilate them into the "superior" culture. Furthermore, when villages become absorbed by a city, their deities lose their agricultural significance, and so Vedic forms of worship are adopted. The form of the deity is also dependent on the primary adherents: for instance Sri Durgalamma in Visakhapatnam has been Sanskritised: Brahmin priests preside, animal sacrifices are not done inside the temple, and she is depicted with Vedic iconography, and is regarded as a peaceful avatara of Lakshmi. This is partly because the majority of devotees are middle-class housewives, to whom the beautiful consort of Vishnu is more palatable to worship than fearsome-looking Durga. The syncretism of the practices of mainstream Hinduism with the deities of the folk religions have the effect of lending them legitimacy in the eyes of most adherents of the faith, offering them greater influence, attracting more popularity, and also replacing them outright by a foreign deity. For instance, with the syncretism of Ayyappan with mainstream Vaishnavism and Shaivism elevated him as an extremely popular deity beyond his native Kerala.

The popular deities have evolved significantly over time. For example, Mariamman, another traditional folk deity, is highly influenced by the Vedic rituals. She is usually garlanded with skulls. But due to Vedic influence, the skull garland has been replaced by the lemon garland, and her malevolent appearance has been altered into a benevolent one. Sometimes, these processes of assimilation lead to the alteration of the deities. When the Brahmins stressed the holiness of the Vedic deities, they also denied the holiness of the deities of the folk tradition. They described the gods and goddesses of folk tradition either as subservient to Vedic deities or venerated these deities as capable of curing the most potent contagious diseases.

However, the process of inclusivism can also be seen in popular temples dedicated to the deities of folk religion. For example, the Mariamman temples of Samayapuram, Punnainallur, and Vazhangaiman in Trichy and Tanjore regions, attract a large number of devotees. These larger temples for traditionally non-Vedic deities have Brahmin priests, who perform rituals as per Vedic customs: including turning Mariamman into a suddhadevata (vegetarian deity) and performing kumbhabhishekam. With regard to the temples of folk tradition, Vinayakar, Murugan, Ayyappan and others, Vedic deities influence the deities of folk tradition such as Madurai Veeran and Karuppannasamy. The devotees of the folk tradition have begun to follow some customs and habits of higher castes in order to raise their social status, integrating them with the mainstream faith.

== See also ==
- Murugan
- Karuppuswamy
- Urumi - a Folk musical instrument used in festivals and as an instrument of getting into trance.
- Veeramanidasan - popular Tamil devotional singer.
- Village deities of Sri Lankan Tamils
