= Ekavuri Amman Temple =

Ekavuri Amman Temple is a Hindu temple located at Vallam near Thanjavur. The temple is dedicated to the goddess Ambika.

== History ==
The earliest temple at the site is believed to have been constructed by Karikala Chola. According to tradition, Chola kings prayed to Ambika at the temple before embarking on their military campaigns.

== Shrines ==
There are shrines for Pratyangira, Murugan, Karuppu Sami, Madurai Veeran and a shivalinga.
