= Bodyguard Muniswaran Temple =

Religion
- Affiliation: Hinduism
- District: Chennai
- Deity: Lord Muneeswarar

Location
- Location: Chennai
- State: Tamil Nadu
- Country: India
- Interactive map of Bodyguard Muniswaran Temple
- Coordinates: 13.0769°N 80.2758°E

Bodyguard Muniswaran Temple is a temple dedicated to Lord Muneeswarar. This is a small temple situated in the main area of Chennai Metropolitan Area. This temple is located just about one and half kilometres away from the Central Railway Station.

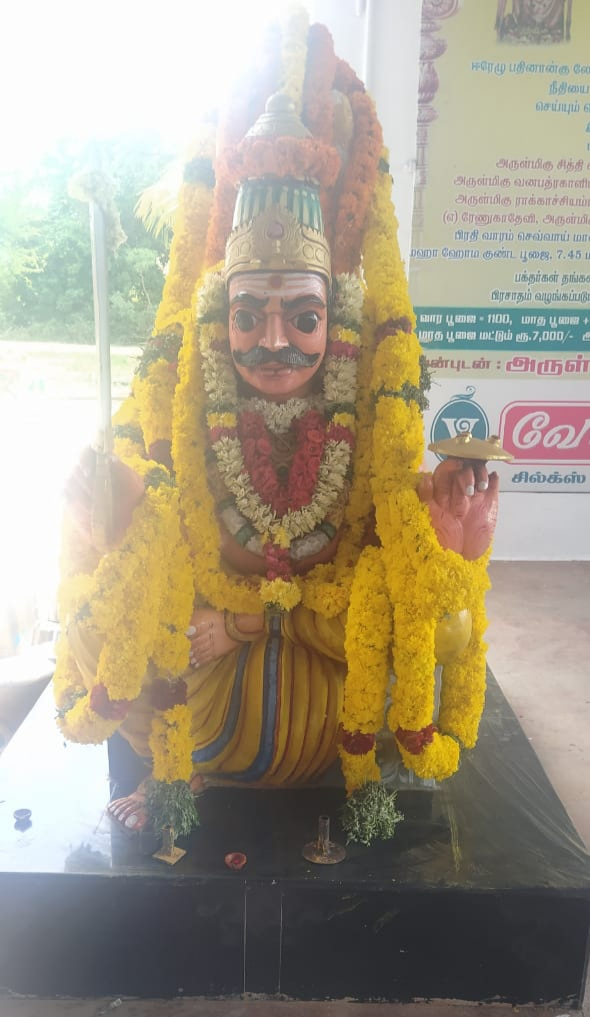
Muneeswarar, Munīshwaran, Munīshwaran முனீஸ்வரன்

== History ==
In 1919 CE, labourers from North Arcot district brought the idol of Lord Muneeswarar to Madras city (present Chennai). They placed it under a neem tree adjoining the military barracks of the Britishers. One of the British Commanders showed his objection. The same day he met with an accident. He started believing that the idol has some powers so he let it be there. From the day many devotees around Chennai worship this Lord and constructed a temple around the idol. They believe that the main deity of the temple Lord Muneeswarar will save them from accidents. So the deity got the name of Bodyguard Muneeswarar. This temple is now visited by thousands of devotees each day.
