= Kateri =

Kateri is a feminine given name. Notable people with the name include:

- Kateri Amman, Hindi goddess
- Kateri Akiwenzie-Damm (born 1965), Canadian writer
- Kateri Champagne Jourdain (born 1981), Canadian politician
- Kateri Tekakwitha (1656–1680), Native American saint
