= Sudalai Madan =

Tamil village deity

Sudalai Madan (IAST: Sudalai Madan) lit. 'cremation ground chief' is a rural Tamil folk religion deity worshipped predominantly in South India, particularly in the districts of Thoothukudi, Virudhunagar, Tirunelveli, Tenkasi, Kanyakumari, and Thiruvananthapuram. He is considered by adherents to be a son of the Hindu deities Shiva and Parvati. He seems to have originated in some ancestral guardian spirit of the villages or communities in Tamil Nadu, in a similar manner as Ayyanar. He is regarded as a kaval deivam (guardian deity) who protects people against evil forces. In Kerala, Sudalai Madan is also called Madan thampuran, Chudala madan, or simply as Madan.

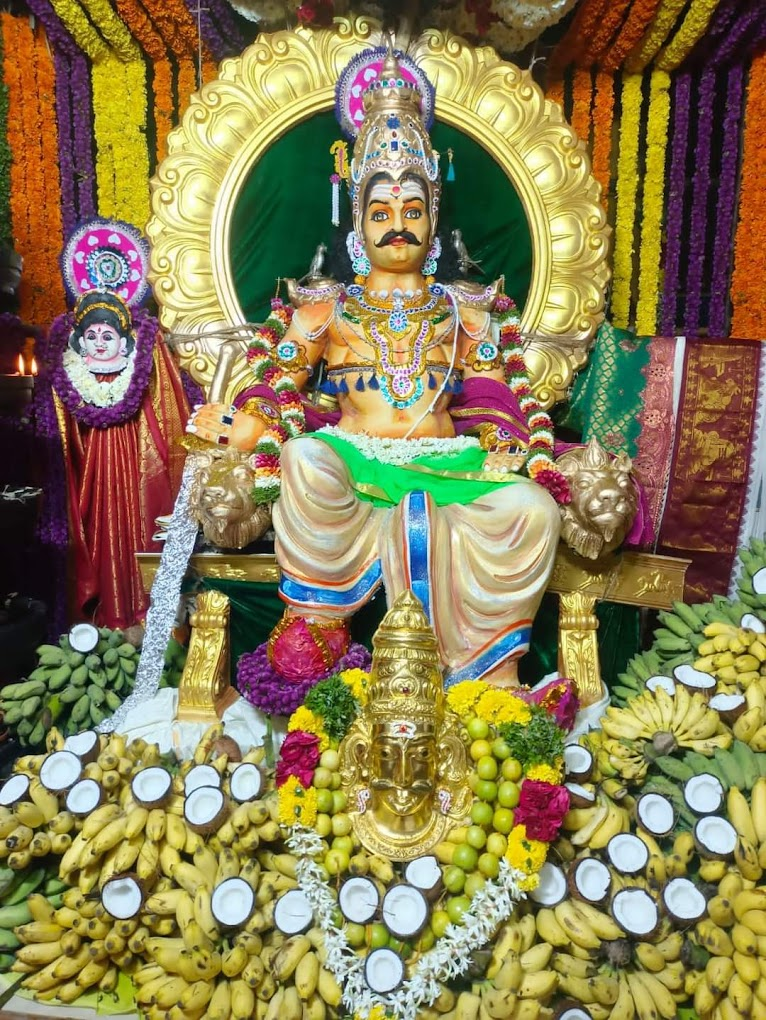
Maramangalam Arulmigu Sri Sudalai eswarar

Shiva is said to have created him and given him the name Sudalai Madan as the protector against evil forces, emanating from cemeteries and cremation grounds (sudalai). He is usually found with mother goddess Pechiamman, Mutharamman, Esakkiamman, Brahmashakti Amman, and Sudalai Mundan. Madathi is his consort.

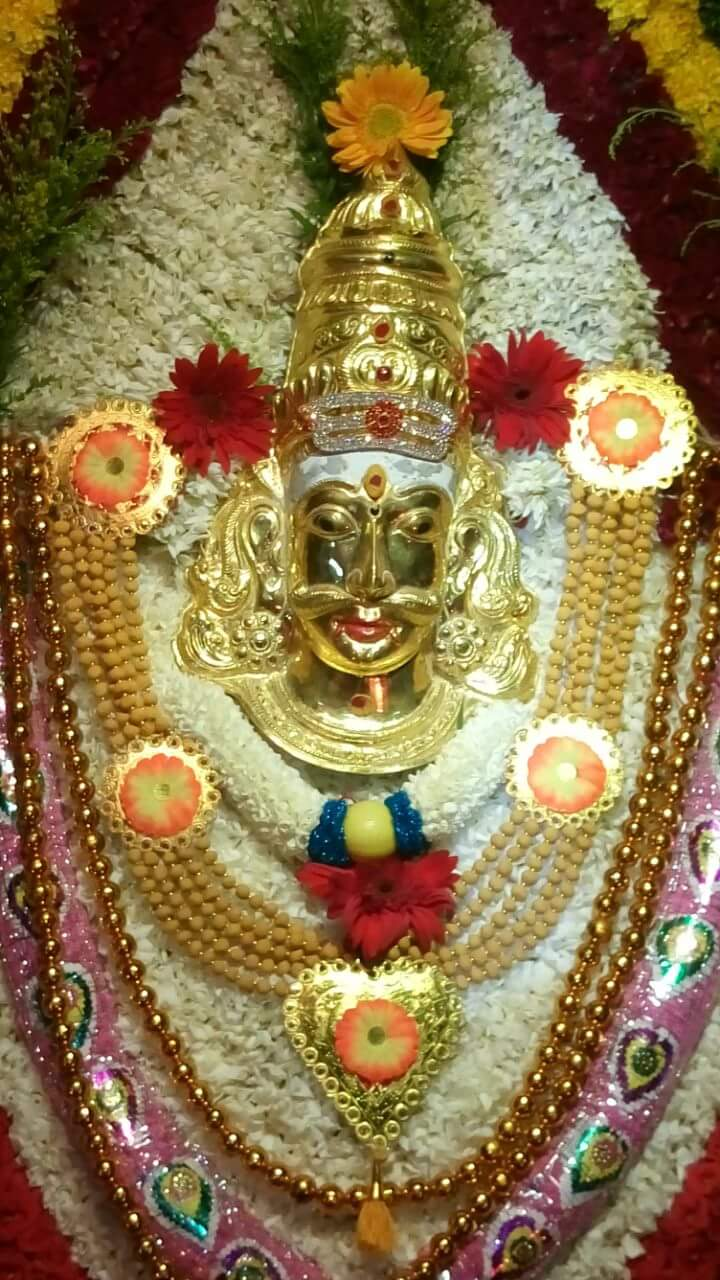
Maramangalam Arulmigu Sri sudalai eswarar

Sudalai is the guardian of the kodimaram (flagstaff) in several temples and also a kuladeivam(god) of folk lore peoples.

== Legend ==
The tale of Sudalai Madan originates from the Tamilfolk tradition of South India. The goddess Parvati wishes to have a child; her husband Shiva suggests that she perform austerities to gain the same. Accordingly, Parvati pleases Shiva by her penance at the Ayiramkal Mandapam at Kailasha, the celestial abode of Shiva. He plucks a lock of hair, which started to burn as soon as he throws it. The fire spreads to her mundanai (a part of the sari). From the fire, Sudalai Madan is born.

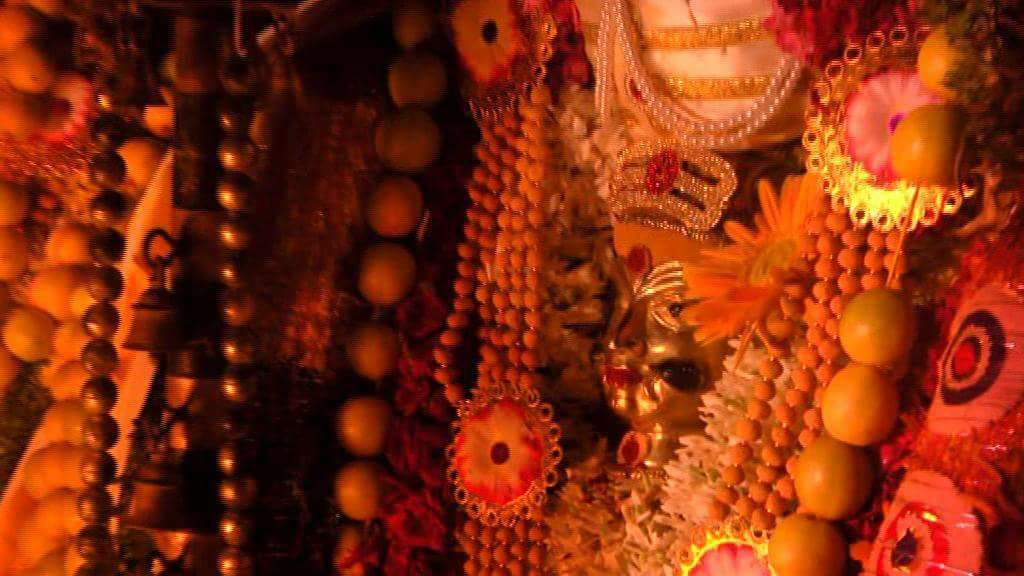
Sudalai Mundan

Parvati initially feeds the child with amrita (the nectar of immortality) instead of breast milk, making him immortal. The child desires solid food. He goes to the cremation grounds (sudalai) on Kailasha, and begins to eat the burning corpses. Since he had such a fondness for meat, Shiva instructs him to go to earth and protect humans. Offerings of cooked food and drink are expected be offered to him, seeking his favour.

== Worship ==
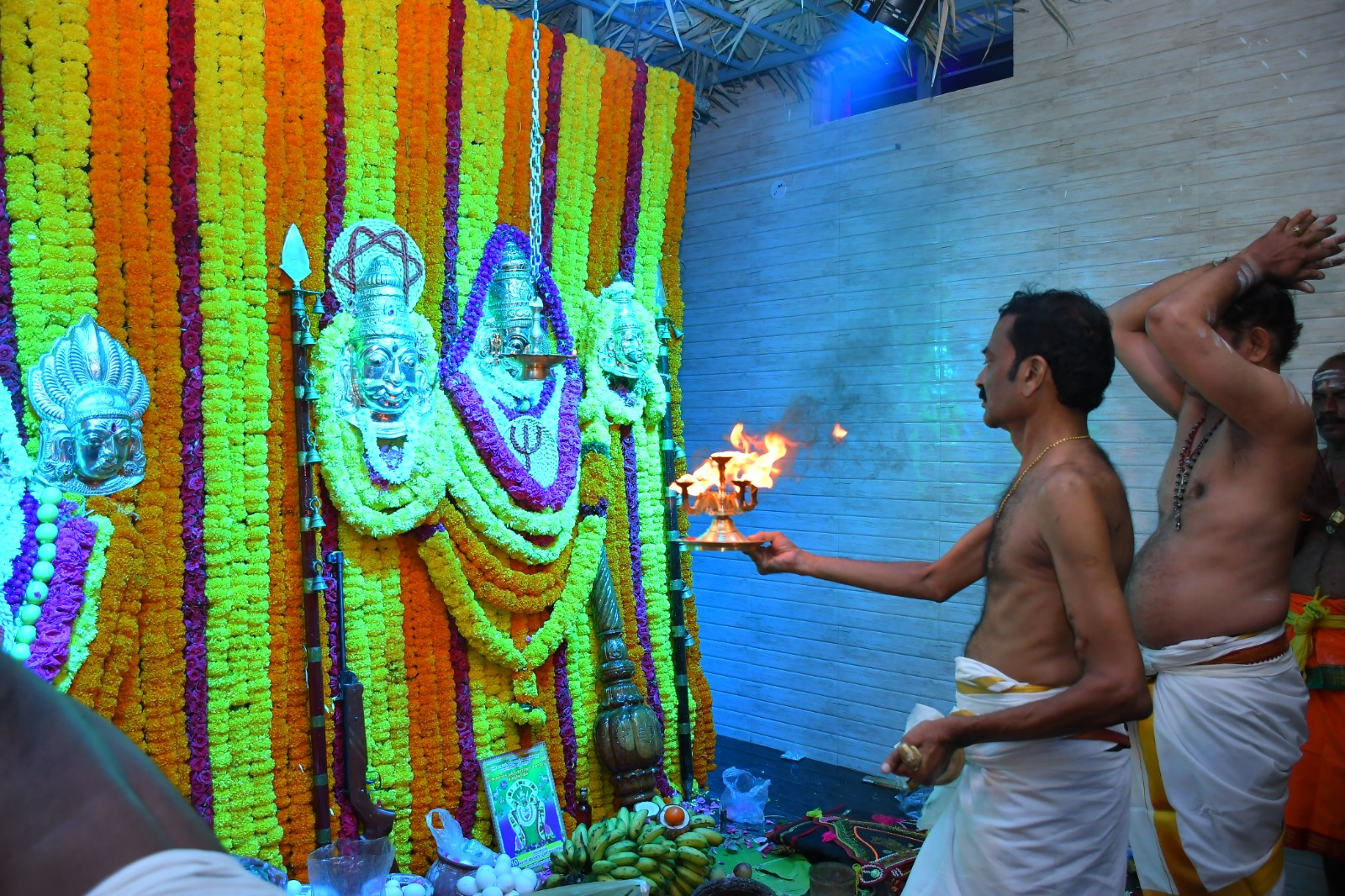
Sudalai

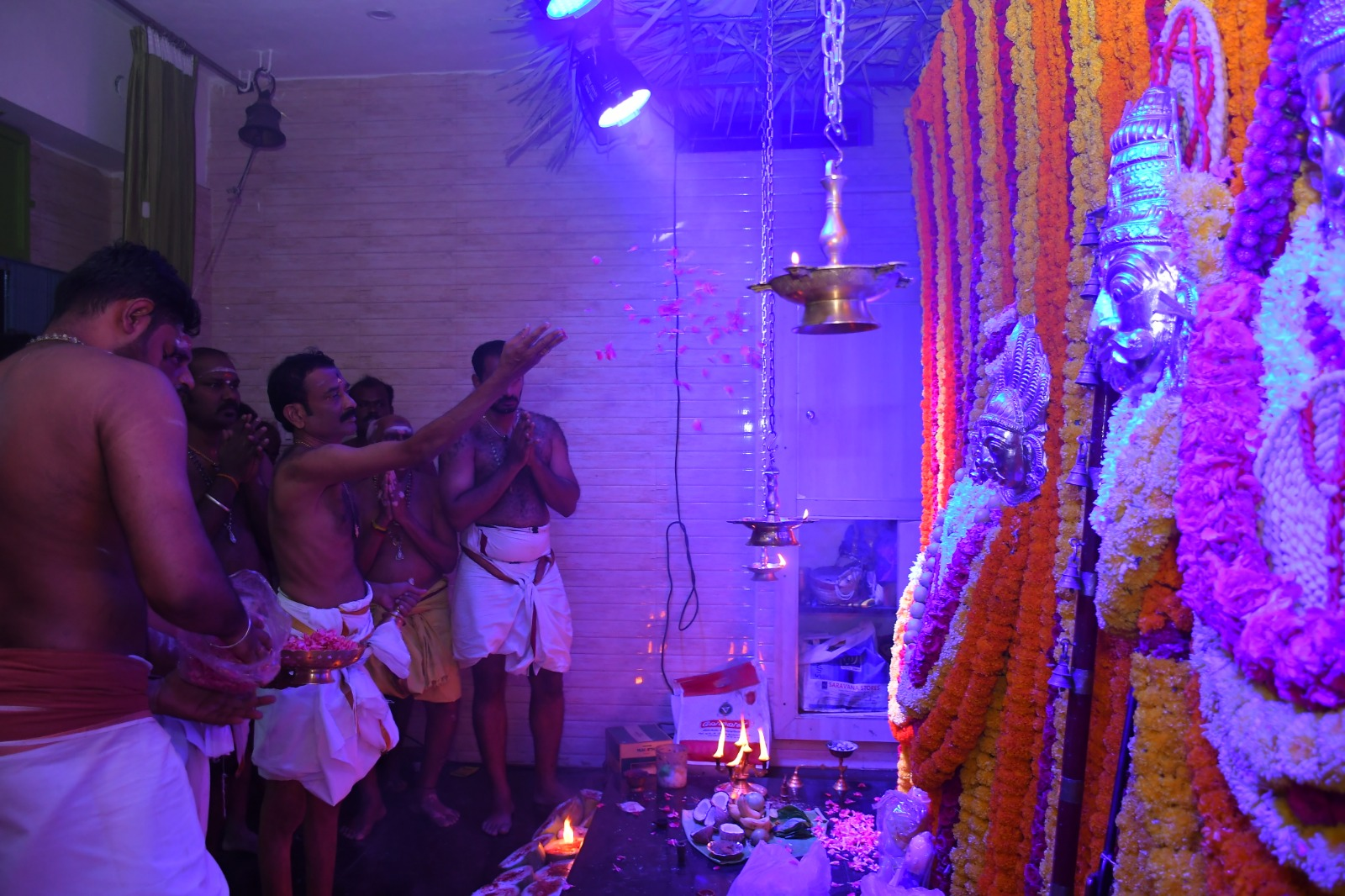
Sudalai

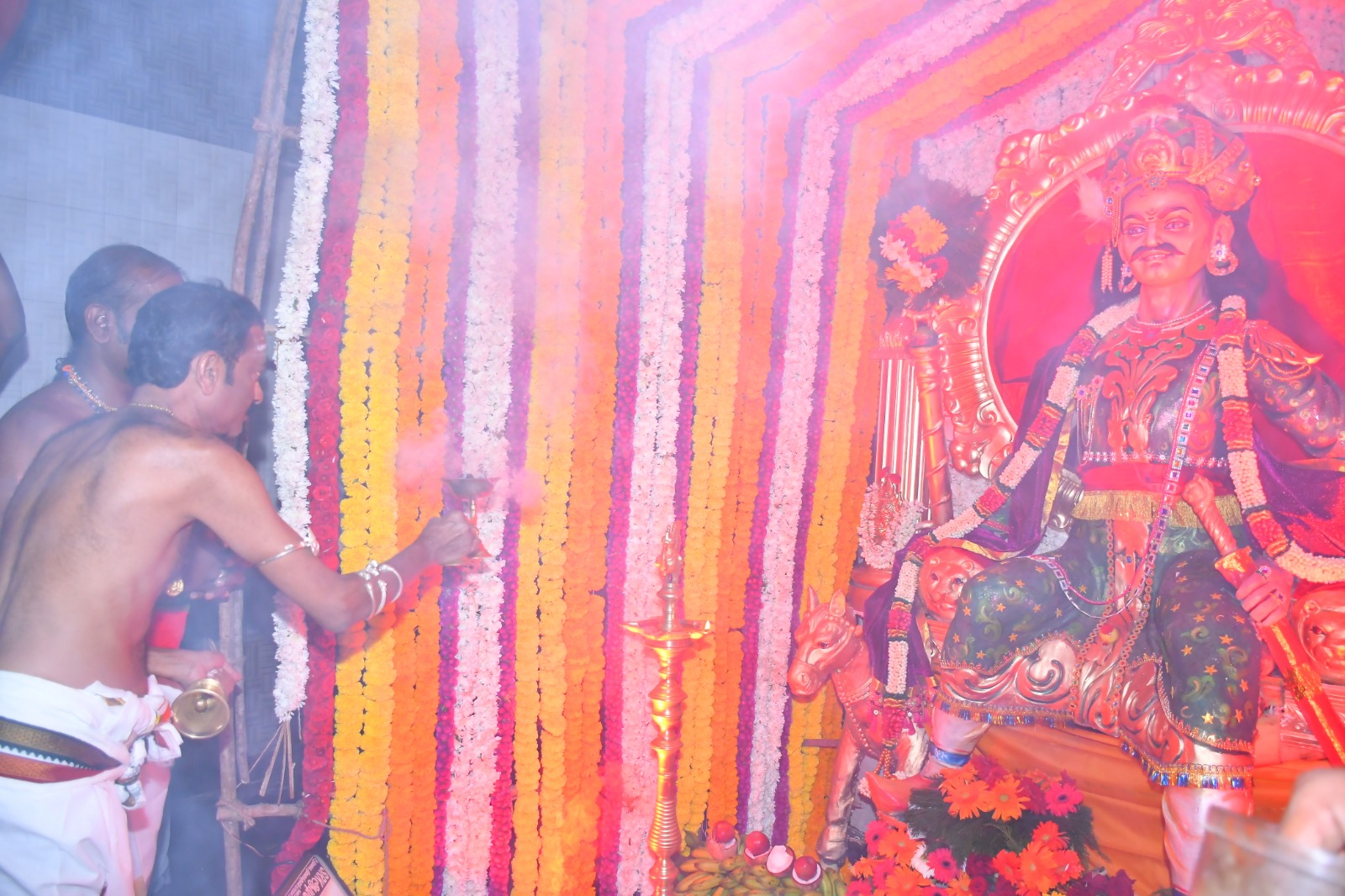
Sudalai

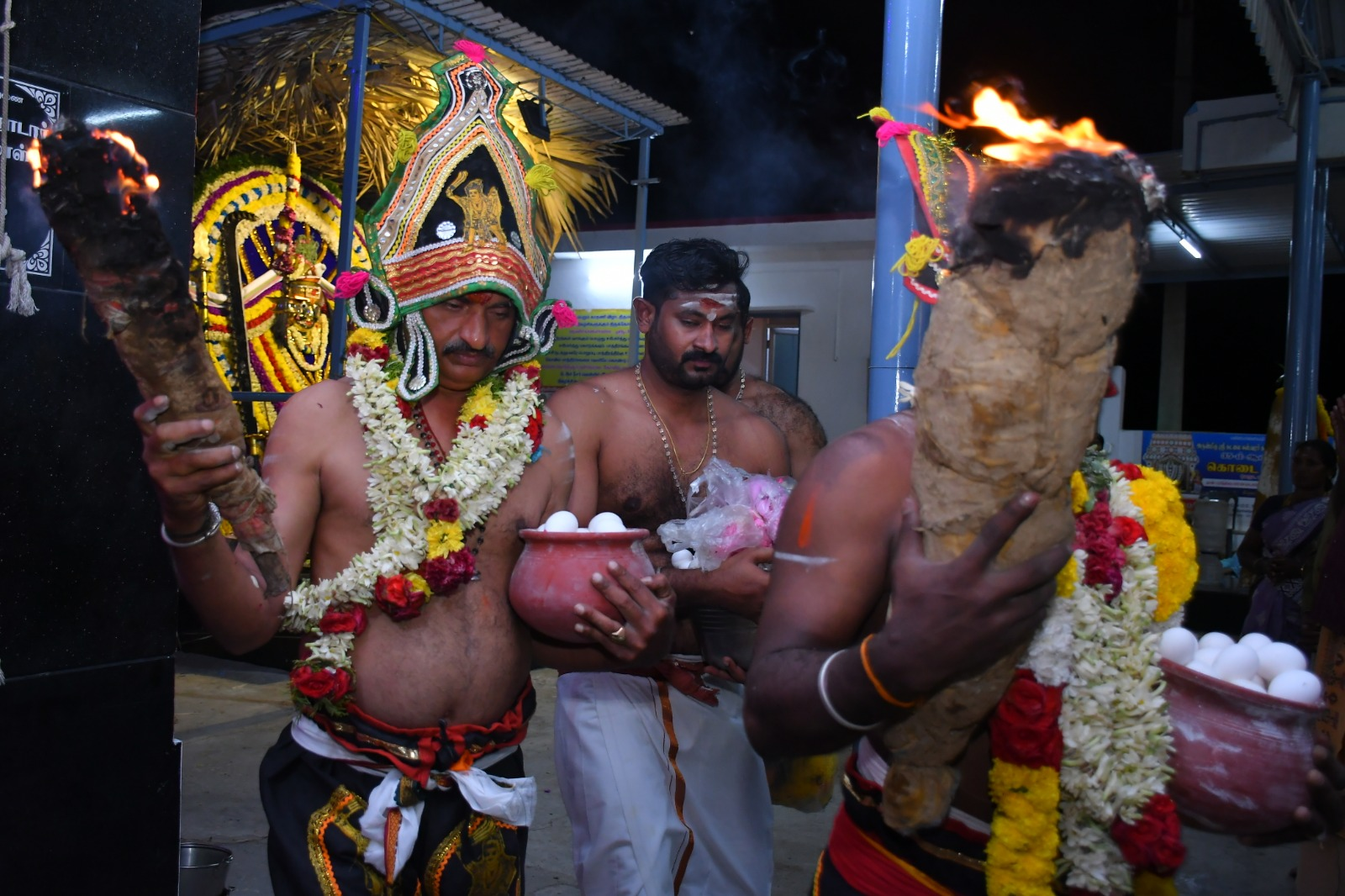
Sudalai

Often, Sudalai Madan statues are triangular pillar-like structures. Figured statues are stone carved. He is situated either in the open or under a simple roof.

Sudalai is still venerated with customs that predate the Vedic religion or his syncretism with Shaivism, regarded as the rituals of the Tamil folk religion. The devotees serve him non-vegetarian foods, which is against mainstream Hindu tradition. Goats, chickens, and pigs are sacrificed and served to him. Fridays are prescribed for his worship. His main festivals are conducted annually. These festivals are called "Kodai". Kodai is celebrated for one day to many days according to the devotees's needs. Some famous temples celebrate it for 10 days.

On these occasions, the deities are decorated with flowers. Some people are believed to become possessed and devotees talk to the deity through them. This deity is believed hunting in the cemetery through this spiritually possessed person. Thappattai beats, Kaniyan Koothu (Maguda Kacheri) and Villupattu are the main performances of Sudalai Madan Kodai festival.

== Temples ==
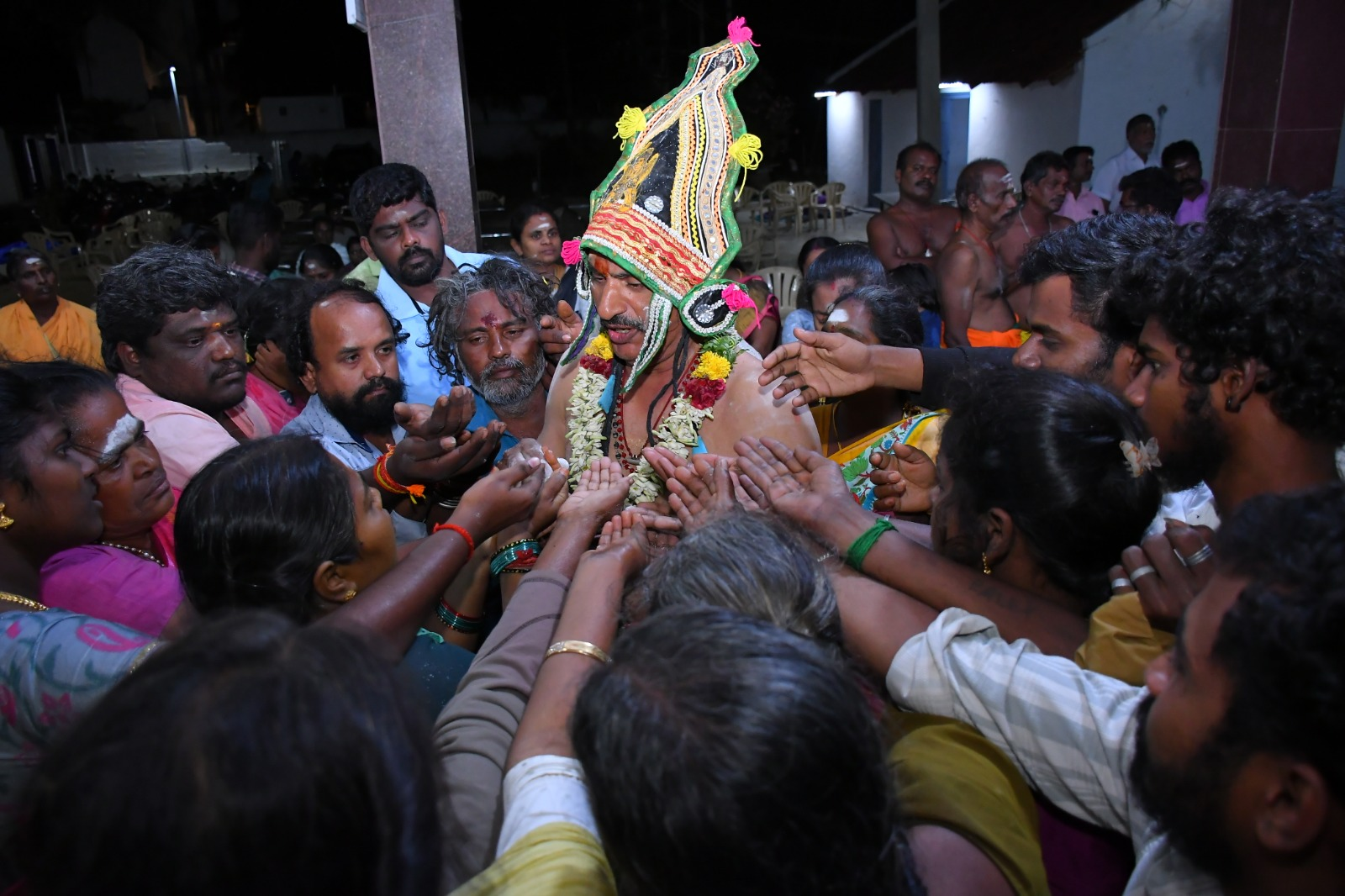
Sudalai Madan

Temples of Sudalai Madan include:

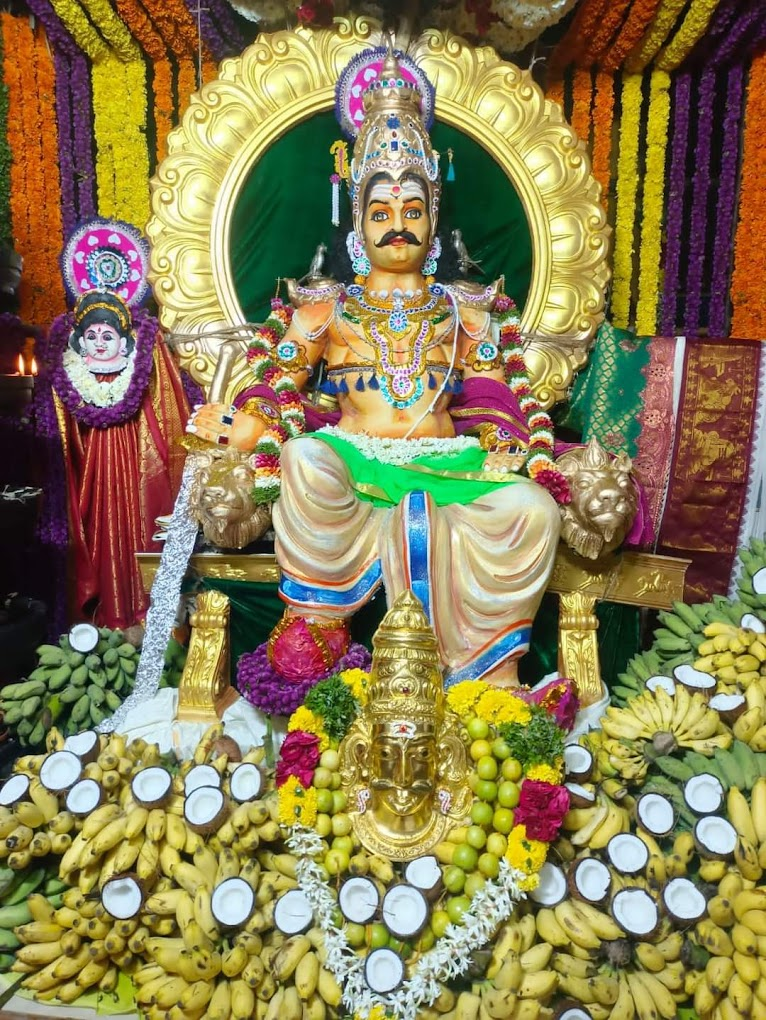
Maramangalam Arulmigu Sri sudalai eswarar

- Arulmigu Shri Sudalai Eswarar Thirukovil, Maramangalam, Thoothukudi.

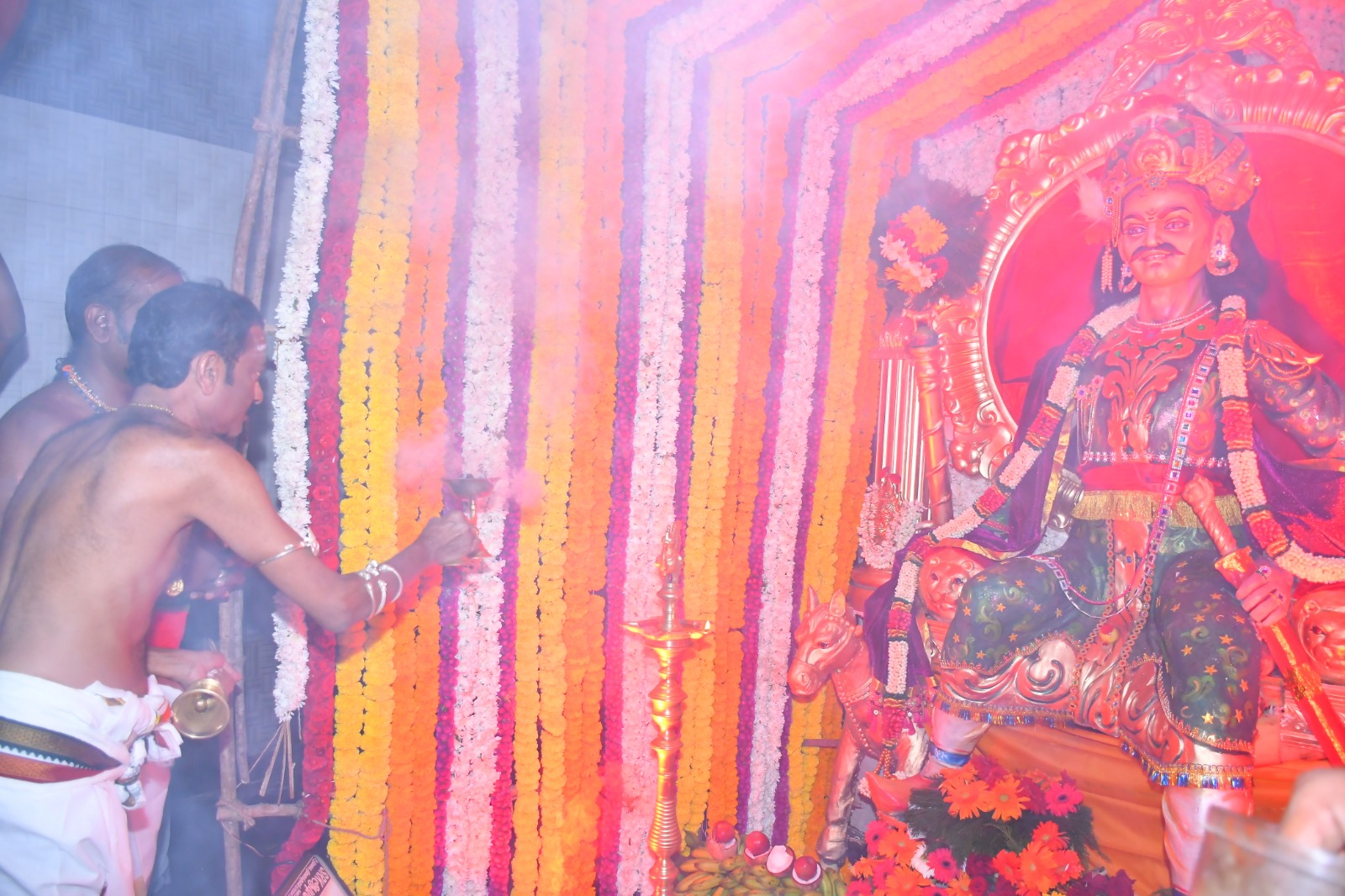
Arulmigu Sri sudalai Eswarar

- Arulmigu Sri Sudalai Eswarar Temple, pallapalayam, udumalpet
- Arulmigu Sri moonkiladi Sudalaimadaswami Thirukovil, Keeraikaranthattu, Tirunelveli(dt)(அருள்மிகு ஸ்ரீ மூங்கிலடி சுடலைமாடசுவாமி திருக்கோவில், கீரைக்காரன்தட்டு, திருநெல்வேலி)
- Arulmigu Sri Parvathi Amman Sudalaimadaswami Thirukoovil, Vadhuvarpatti, Virudhunagar (dt)
- Arulmigu Mottagalunga Swamy tirukovil, Avudaiyannor, Tenkasi(dt)
- Arulmigu Sudalai madan Swamy tirukovil, Angarayankulam, Tenkasi(dt)
- Aatrangarai Sudalai madan, Ilanji, Tenkasi
- Seevalaperi sudalai madan
- Sri Sudalai Madan Temple, Mukkani, Thoothukudi.
- Kayathar sudalai madasamy kovil
- Sri Karayadi Sudalai Madaswamy, Pechiamman Temple, Sathankulam
- Otha Panai Sudalai Madan Swami Temple, Sirumalanchi
- High Court Maharaja Temple, Arumuga Mangalam, Thoothukudi
- Vijayanarayanapuram
- Oosikattu/Ooikattu Sudalai Madan Temple
- Palavur, Arulmigu Sudalai Kovil
- Ozhuginaseri Masana Sudalai Temple
- Kurichi Sudalai Madan Temple, Suchindrum
- Maha SivaSudalai Temple, Colachel and the entire region of Tirunelveli, Tuticorin and Kanniyakumari district
- Vaigai Sri Sudalaimadasami Temple, Kilakkarai (Ramnanathapuram District)
- PUDUPATI ARULMIGU PERIYA OORANI SUDALAI (Alangulam Tirunelveli District)
- Sudalai Madan Temple in Gopalasumdram
- SullaKarai Sudalai Madaswamy Andipatti, Alangulam, Tirunelveli District
- Arulmigu Sri Sudalai Mada Swami Temple, Irulappapuram, Kanyakumari District
- Adukkupeeda Sudalai Madaswamy, Sinthamani, Tirunelveli District
- Arulmigu Valli Vaikkal Sudali Madan Swamy Temple, Arumuganeri, Thoothukudi District
- Arulmigu Poonankundru Siva Sudalai Madaswamy kovil, Therkusalai, Agastheeswaram, Kanyakumari, Tamil Nadu.
- Sri Sudalai Madanthambiran Swamy Temple, Navalady, Tirunelveli district.
- Arulmigu kalathu kovil Sudalai madan swamy kovil, Vellamadam, Kanyakumari.
- Arulmigu Athiadi Sudalaimadan kovil, athiputhur, Tirunelveli Dt.
- Sudalai Kovil, Palazvur, Tirunelveli
- Madan Kovil,
- Viswakula Arulmigu Sudalaimadaswamy Temple [VAST], Udayathoor Village, Radhapuram Taluk, Tirunelveli District, Tamil Nadu, India
- Sri Sudalai Madasamy temple, Kothaiseri Tirunelveli.
- Sri Mayiladumparai Sudalai, Esakki Amman Temple, Shenbagaramanallur
- Sri Sudalai Madasamy Kovil, Kalakadu, Tirunelveli.
- Sri Sudalai Madasamy, Pechiamman Temple, Koviloothu, Tirunelveli.
- Sudalai Madansamy temple, Rettai Thirupathi, Thoothukudi.

== Outside India ==
Madan is popular amongst the Tamil diaspora in Sri Lanka, Singapore, Malaysia, Réunion and French overseas territories in the Caribbean sea.

In Sri Lanka, The Sri Madaswamy Kovil located at Hatton Road, Pavalamalai, Ginigathena is an example of the popularity of Madasamy in Sri Lanka

== See also ==
- Bhairava
- Karuppuswamy
