= Pothuraju =

Hindu folk deity

Potu Raju
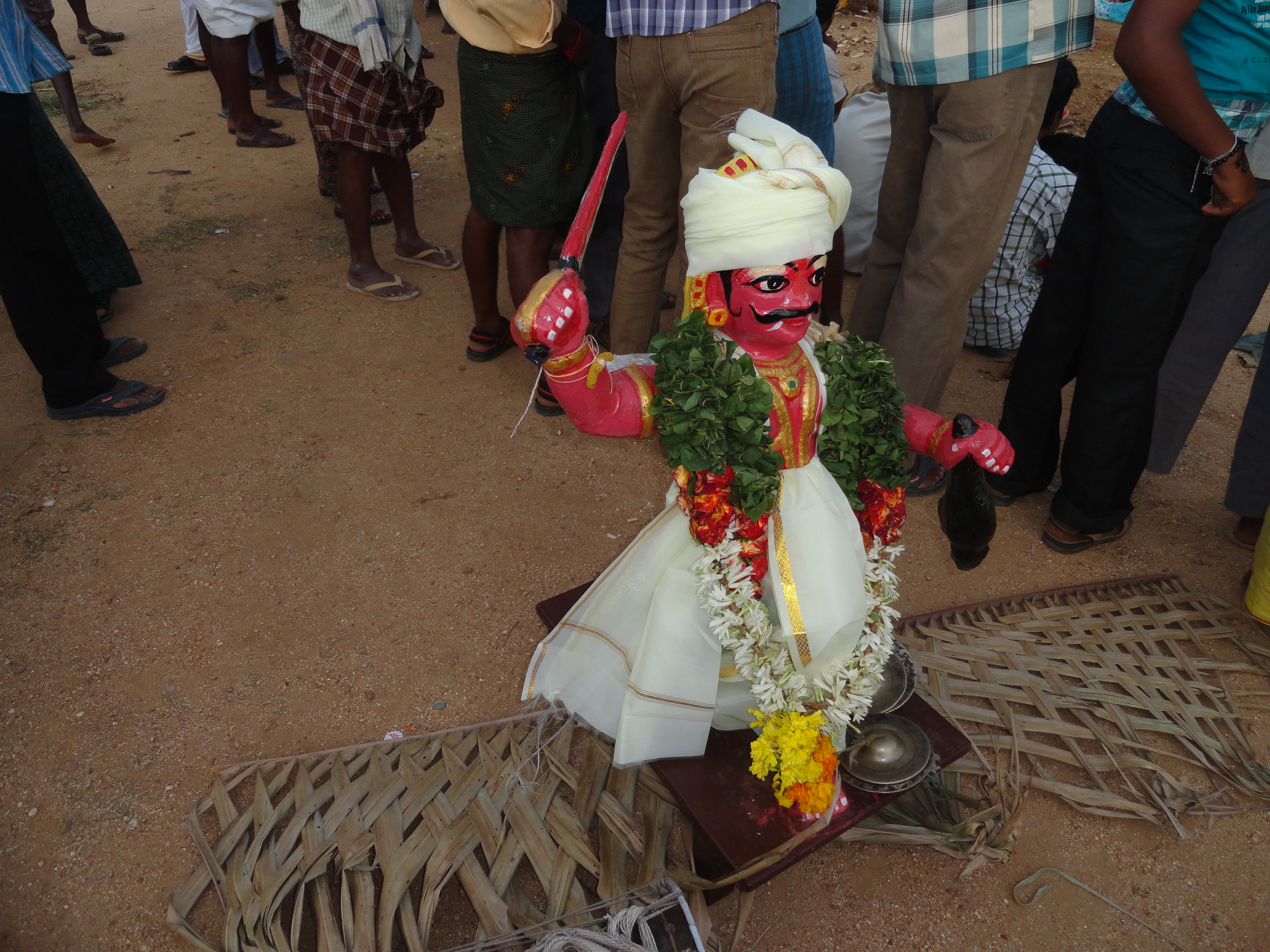
- Figurine of Potu Raju
- Affiliation: Vaishnavism
- Region: South India

Genealogy
- Siblings: Yellamma
- Consort: Kamavalli

Potu Raju (Telugu: పోతరాజు, romanized: Pōtu Rāju) is a Hindu folk deity, regarded as a form of Vishnu by his adherents. He is considered to be a gramadevata in regions of South India, and considered to be the brother of a female deities, such as Gangamma or Yellamma.

== Legend ==
There are a number of varying legends and stories about the origin and the purpose of the deity, but he is generally regarded as the protector of the shakti of goddesses in their temples and processions, and is celebrated in the Bonalu festival.

In Andhra Pradesh and Telangana, women from agrarian communities revere a pantheon of Sapta Kanyakas, the seven virgin goddesses: Poleramma, Ankamma, Mutyalamma, Pochamma, Bangaramma, Maramma, and Yellamma, whose only brother is regarded to be Potu Raju. He is considered as the embodiment of the eldest sister, Pochamma.

It is traditionally believed that once, Lakshmi, as Sita, was bewitched by the sight of Rama, and wished to sport with him in the forest. When Rama refused, she cursed him that in his next life, he would spend his next life surrounded by wicked men, and he, in turn, genially told her that she would be born as a mortal in her next life as Kameshvari (Kamavalli), and always smile at the sound of his name. Upon her request, Shiva placed the shakti of Lakshmi in a pool, from which Parvati inadvertently took seven gulps, creating the seven sister-goddesses. Since the divine couple could not decide upon adopting them, Potu Raju was born to protect the sisters. When Brahma creates a pair of three sisters from the pool to also guard the goddesses, Potu Raju takes one of them, Kamavalli, as his wife.

In Tamil Nadu, he is considered by some rural communities to be the younger brother of Muniandi.
