= Aruval =

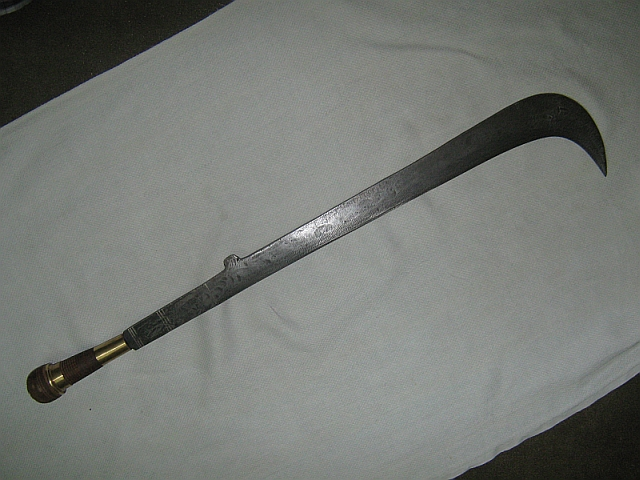
- A typical aruval from Tamil Nadu.
- Type: Billhook machete
- Place of origin: Tamil Nadu, India

Specifications
- Length: 3 to 6 feet (0.91 to 1.83 m)

The aruval (ISO: arivāḷ) is a type of billhook machete from southern India, particularly common in the Tamil Nadu and Kerala. It is also known as the koḍuvāḷ, the kodavali, the machchu longu or the koita. It is a type of long sickle with a knife-like scythe-handle, and is used both as a tool and a weapon. Tamils revere the weapon as a symbol of Karupannar. In popular culture, it is sometimes associated with gangsters, especially in the Rayalaseema region. In Kerala, its primary use is for agriculture, mainly in coconut cutting, clearing pathways, cutting wood and other uses.

== Introduction ==
An aruval usually measures 3–6 ft (0.91–1.83 m) in length (hand sickle measures 1.5 ft (0.46 m)). The blade of this weapon originates at the grip and extends to the main part of the blade. It can be described as a sickle with an extension. It can also be thought of as a sword with a reverse curve. The shorter versions were handy for breaking apart coconuts, and the longer versions were more like battle weapons. The shorter version is usually seen in small villages. Blades are mostly straight with a curve towards the end, allowing it to function as a grabbing tool. The straight portion of the blade is also used for cutting, like a standard knife.

== Variants and usage ==
While farmers typically employ the standard billhook machete kathir aruvāl koyttharivaal for harvesting crops, a longer variation called the veecharuvāl is used for clearing through wooded areas. In Kerala, Malayalam language references the semi-circular knife for paddy, called "koduval" and the regular sized billhook machete is known as "vaakathi" (coconut cutting); while the veecharuval is known simply as aruval. The veecharuval was also used as a weapon and is still used as such for self-defence in rural areas or gang warfare in cities. When not in use, the weaponised aruval was worn on the back, with the blade pointing downwards and the handle just behind the user's head. Some aruvals, such as those used for Khaval Dheivam, are 3.5 ft (1.1 m) in length.

The aruval is often used for worshipping Hindu deities, such as Karuppu Sami and Aiyanar. Craftsmen have made large, decorative aruval which are kept in temples, such as those in Sivagangai and Thiruppachethi. In 2017, an aruval measuring 27 feet (8.2 m) was forged in Thirupuvanam.

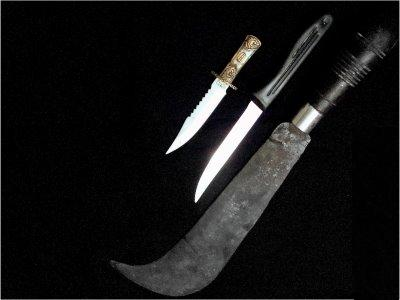
Veecharuval

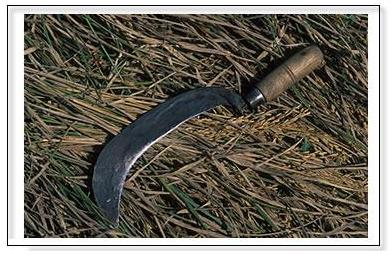
Kathir aruval

== In culture ==
The aruval is a common fixture in many South Indian films, in which it is often used as a weapon. The hero or villain often has the aruval in a sleeve sewn into the inside back of his shirt, and will pull it out by reaching behind his neck. The film historian S. Theodore Baskaran has stated that using aruval as a weapon is largely a narrative cliche, and non-fictional murders using it occur relatively rarely. Nevertheless, the government prohibits aruvals over 2 feet (0.61 m) for general purchase, as well as the veecharuvāl.

In Maharashtra, particularly Pune, Koita gangs are famous.

A veecharuval was among the weapons used by the title character of Kraven the Hunter.

In Mercy for None, a Korean drama, one of the foreign assassin use this as a weapon.

== See also ==
- Aiyanar
- Billhook
- Karuppu Sami
- Machete
- Madurai Veeran
- Village deities of South India
- Kraven the Hunter
