= Madurai Veeran =

Tamil folk hero

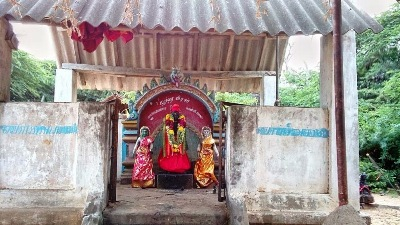
- A statue of Madurai Veeran in Salem, Tamil Nadu.
- Weapon: Sword or Aruval
- Mount: White horse
- Region: Madurai

Genealogy
- Died: Madurai
- Consorts: Bommi and Vellaiyammal

Madurai Veeran, also known as Veeran, is a Tamil Hindu folk deity popular in southern Tamil Nadu, India. His name literally means, "warrior of Madurai".

== Legend ==
According to the Maduraiveeraswamikathai text, Veeran was born to aristocratic parents and was abandoned, and later adopted by a couple from the Dalit community. He grew up among them and became a guard in the court of King Bommanna Nayakan. When on duty as a guard of the chieftain's daughter Bommi, he fell in love with her. At night, he sneaked up to her room, and the two eloped. During their escape, Bommanna Nayakan led an army after Veeran, and the latter defeated the army and killed Bommanna. The two then fled to Tiruchirappalli, where Veeran was requested by the local king to defeat bandits terrorising his people, which he did so successfully and famously.

The irony lies in the fact that he actually belonged to the Arunthathiyar caste. Among the upper caste communities, there is an unwillingness to accept that such a great warrior could emerge from a lower caste. As a result, it was falsely claimed that he was adopted by the Arunthathiyar community rather than being born among them, reflecting deeply ingrained societal prejudices.

His fame brought him to Madurai, which was also troubled by bandits. Thirumala Nayakar requested Veeran to help him. Veeran then met Vellaiyammal, a royal dancer, who was attracted to him because of his looks and skill in various arts. She asked him to teach her the Natya Shastra (tenets of dancing). The king, who was himself attracted to Vellaiyammal, did not appreciate this development and viewed this as an affair. Some of his generals, who hated the closeness of Veeran to the king, used the opportunity to inform the king that the delay in suppressing the robbers was deliberate, as Veeran was conniving with the robbers themselves. Furious, the king ordered a traitor's death for Veeran, who was taken to the gallows and had his alternate hands and legs chopped off (marukkal marukkai). Hearing of this, Bommi and Vellaiyammal went to the gallows to see the severed limbs and chastise the king for his injustice.

The legend says that Veeran is brought back to life, by his limbs joined back miraculously, by the virtues of both these women and is vindicated by the presence of gods. Veeran thereafter retires to a cave beneath what is now the Meenakshi Amman Temple.

Other versions of the tale say that Veeran and Velaiyammal attempted to elope but were caught by the guards. Mistaken for a bandit, he faced the punishment of dismemberment. Both Bommi and Velaiyammal prayed to the goddess Meenakshi that he regain his limbs, which he did. But he believed he must die by the will of the goddess, and he cut his own head off with his sword, dying thereafter. Both Bommi and Vellaiyammal threw themselves into his funeral pyre, and the king was sorrowful once he learnt his true identity. Veeran then prayed to Goddess Meenakshi to ritualize his death properly. Veeran is then reborn as a member of the lower class, disrupting normal life in a dream of the king, and troubles ensue in real life. When the king asks Shiva and Meenakshi regarding this, they tell him it is because Madurai Veeran's death was not honoured correctly.

A shrine for Madurai Veeran was later erected at the east gate of the Meenakshi Amman Temple by the king. The story persists through the singing of songs and street theatre. Another shrine of him exists in the Mariamman Temple in Samayapuram.

== See also ==
- Madurai Veeran (1956 film)
- Village deities of South India
- Ayyanar
- Karuppu Sami
- Muneeswarar
- Sudalai Madan
- Urumee
