= Kateri Amman =

Hindu folk deity

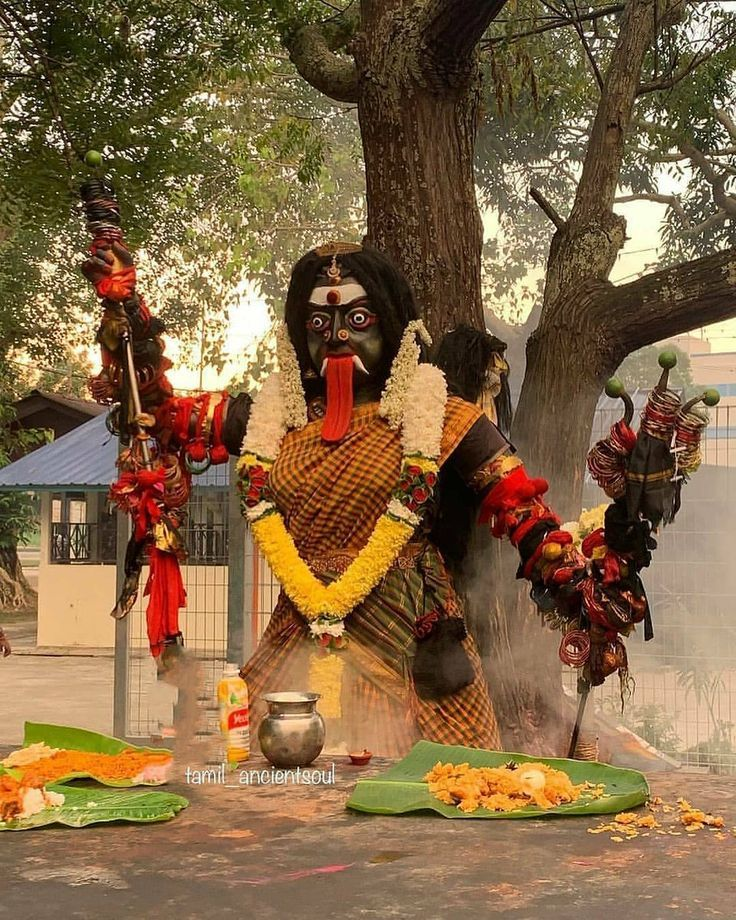
- Venerated in: Dravidian folk religion
- Affiliation: Parvati
- Mantra: Ōm āim hrīm śrīm klīm
- Weapon: Sword, Trishula
- Mount: Horse
- Gender: Female
- Consort: Munishvaran

Kateri Amman (Tamil: காட்டேரி அம்மன்), also abbreviated to Kateri, is a Tamil guardian deity associated with protecting specific towns and villages. Her worship originates in the Dravidian folk religion and Tamil folklore and later assimilated into mainstream Hinduism as a form of Parvati. Some of her adherents also regard her to be a form of Mahadevi, tasked with the responsibility of destroying sicknesses during the Kali Yuga. The goddess is often depicted with her consort, Munishvaran.

== Legend ==
According to Tamil folklore, Shiva once spotted his consort, Parvati, leave their bed in the middle of the night, and return only before sunrise. When he questioned her regarding this, his wife was puzzled, and informed him that she had not left his side all night. When Shiva observed this happening once more, he proceeded to follow her from Kailasa to a forest, and witnessed that she had assumed the terrible form of Kali, digging up corpses, with the intention of consuming them. Determined to stop her, he dug a hole in the forest path. When Kali fell within the hole and saw Shiva, she was filled with remorse for her actions, and promised Shiva that she would end this morbid pursuit. She also told Shiva that she would leave behind her terrible form within the hole, and return to him as a dutiful wife. The shakti that was left behind would become her form of Kateri Amman, a benevolent goddess who destroys sicknesses, and shields her adherents.

However, the goddess is sometimes also identified with malevolent aspects, according to the folklore of certain communities. According to Dalit folklore, for instance, Kateri Amman's origin is traced back to a curse laid upon her by Shiva, which causes her to roam amid the forests, preying on pregnant women if she is not worshipped. Kateri is also portrayed to be violent and witch-like for this reason, associated with rituals that involve blood and spiritual possession. She is portrayed to be an entity who protects children if she is pleased, and strangles them if she is displeased.

== Iconography ==
Kateri is often depicted in many forms. Her skin tone is represented to be either dark blue or black. She is seen either holding a aruval, bowl, trishula, lotus, or all of these attributes in her four-armed form.

== Worship ==
Kateri Amman is worshipped in the villages of South India and Sri Lanka by the Dalit community. She is also venerated by the Tamil diaspora in other places including Trinidad, Guyana, Jamaica, Mauritius and South Africa. Her offerings include neem leaves, limes, and red flowers. Animal sacrifices using chickens and pigs are also common amongst her worshippers. She is considered as a kuladaivaṃ.
