= Karuppannaswamy =

Tamil Hindu deity

- Patroller of Boundaries
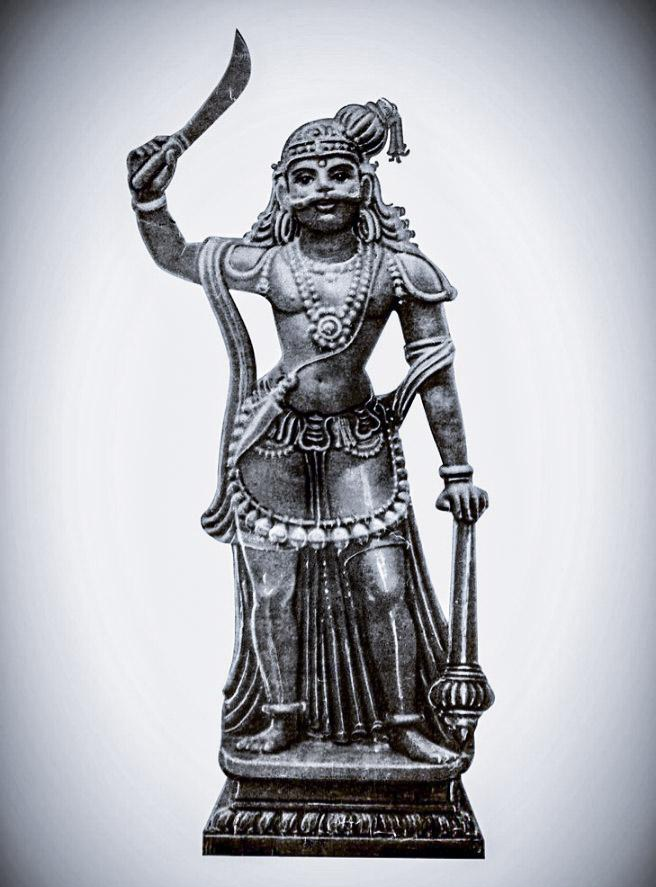
- Idol of Karuppannaswamy
- Other names: Aandavar; Karupparayan; Karuppannaswamy; Maayandi Karuppa; Ayyan
- Tamil Malayalam: கருப்பண்ணசாமி കറുപ്പണ്ണസാമി
- Affiliation: Dravidian folk religion
- Abode: Not accurate
- Weapon: Aruval, Spear, Gada, Sword, Silver stick
- Day: Tuesday, Wednesday, Friday, Saturday
- Mount: Horse, Elephant

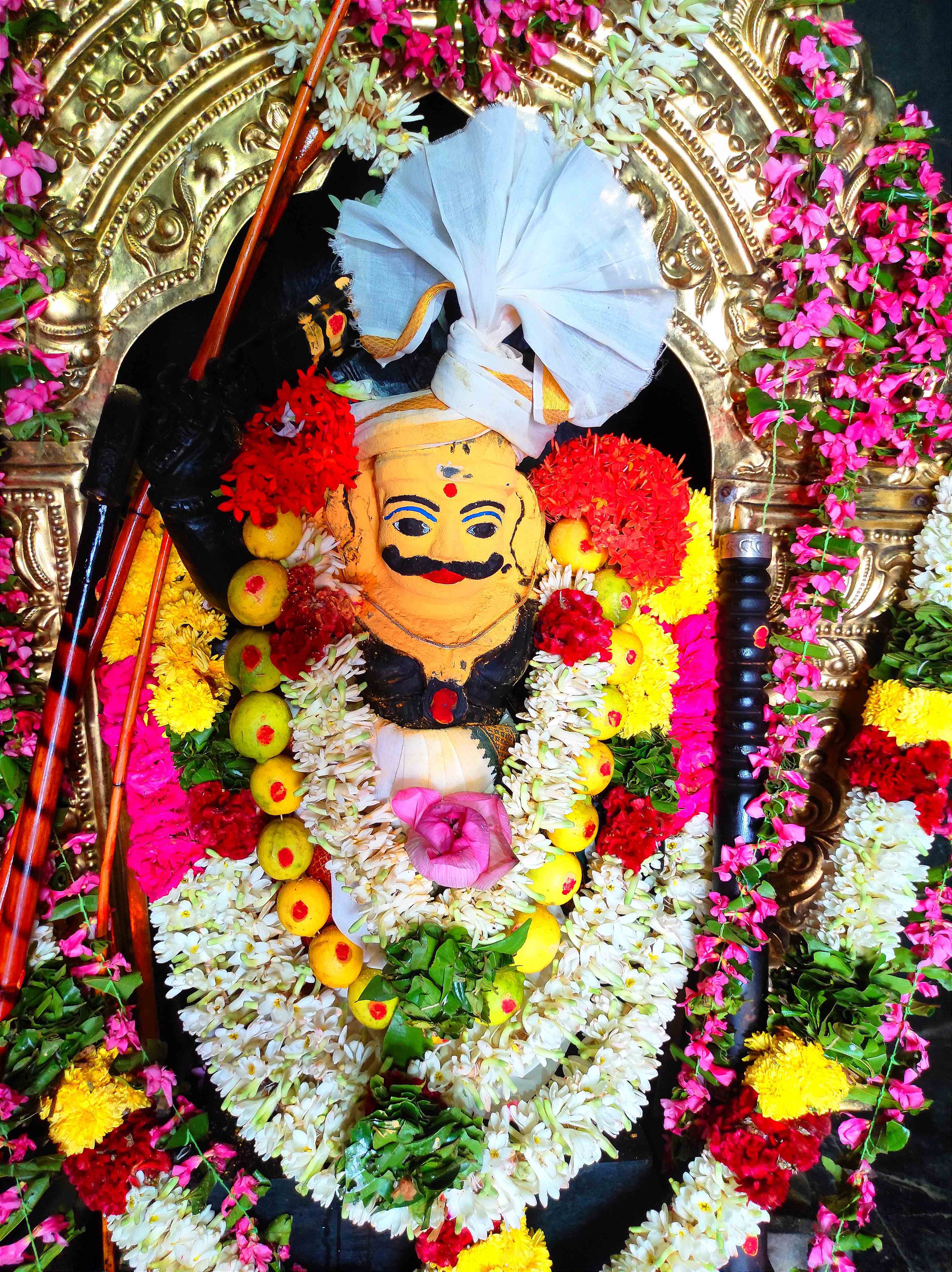
Vathiyaar Thottathu Karuppu Sami

Karuppuswamy or Karupparayan (Tamil: கருப்பசாமி, Malayalam: കറുപ്പണ്ണസാമി; romanization: Karuppusāmi; Bhojpuri and Awadhi: संगानी बाबा, lit. 'Black God' or 'Black') is a guardian deity (kaval daivam) in the Dravidian folk religion, especially among rural and agrarian communities in Tamil Nadu, Kerala, and Sri Lanka. He is revered as a fierce protector, upholder of justice, and divine enforcer of dharma (righteousness).

Among Indians, Karuppuswamy is represented as a village deity (gramadevata) as well as an ancestral deity (kuladevata). Adherents, especially in Tamil Nadu and the border regions of Kerala, believe that the deity was once a historical figure who fought to protect his community and, over time, became deified.

Among Indo-Caribbean communities, Karuppasamy is called Sanganie Baba. In the Indo-Caribbean communities of Trinidad and Tobago, Guyana, Suriname, Guadeloupe, and Martinique, Sanganie Baba is worshipped as a powerful deity.

== Temples ==
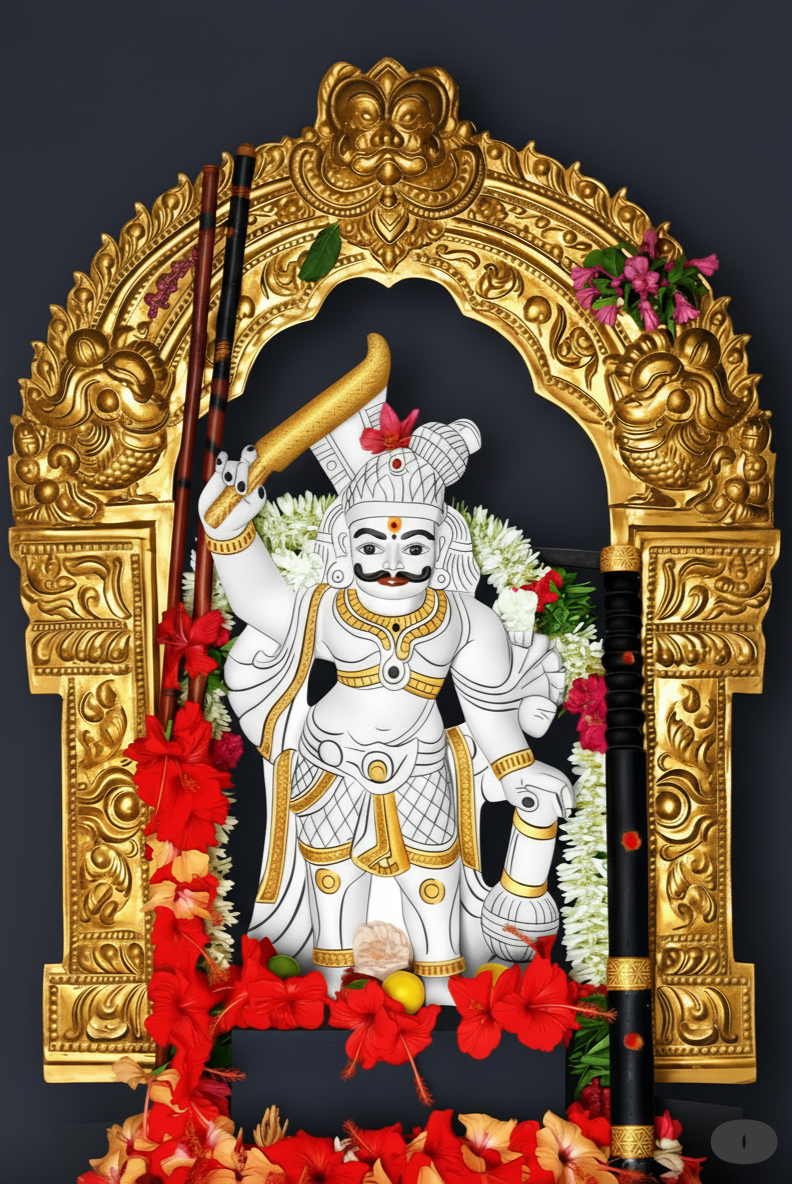
Karuppasamy wielding an aruval

Karuppuswamy temples are found outside of settlements, with entire villages contributing to the maintenance of them. These temples do not have gopurams but do house large statues of deities with large eyes, holding weapons like bows and arrows, swords, and sickles.

== Worship ==
Karuppuswamy worship is based on an ancient, ancestral, clan-based worship system in Hinduism. Here, most officiating priests are non-Brahmanas and derive from local lineages that had initiated the religious tradition generations ago. The worship pattern is non-Vedic, or non-Agamic, and is expressed through folk tales, songs, art, and dance, including Villu Paattu, Karakattam, and Koothu.

The local priests offer flowers and vibhuti (holy ash) to worshippers and play the role of oracles. Various people within the clan system are nominated to play the role of oracle on an annual rotation. They undertake a vrata and maintain chastity and purity during the period in which they serve as the oracle. During festivals, oracles enter the trance state of Swami Adudhal and deliver counselling messages to the group assembled there without bias.

The trance is an important phenomenon that occurs in Karuppuswamy worship. This phenomenon enables the god to possess the body of a human, who then goes on to display physical traits of the god. This occurs at major festivals or prayers, and is considered a clear sign of the physical presence or blessing of the god. Some practitioners willingly invoke the god into their bodies, while for others it occurs without their control. Trance is also used as a platform for devotees to communicate with the god and vice versa, to provide solutions and advice on a multitude of topics.

In some temples, before the oracles deliver counselling messages, they stand on top of an aruval (specifically in forms of Karuppuswamy such as Periyakaruppu, Muthukaruppu, or Muppiliyaan). The issues addressed can include family problems, financial troubles, and local community and social issues, resolved within the community group through the agreement of a local ancestral god conveyed through the oracle. Whenever the wishes of the people are granted, they give offerings to him according to their vows. He is worshipped through several traditional ceremonies such as Kodei Vila, Mayaana Vettei, Kalari Thiruvila, and Theemithi, as well as through methods like Nadu Kazh Valipadu and Aruval Vazhipadu.

Karuppuswamy is also worshipped in Trinidad and Tobago, Guyana, Fiji, Mauritius, Réunion, Seychelles, Guadeloupe, Singapore, Malaysia, Martinique as Sangili Karuppan, Sangani Baba.

== In Indo-Caribbean Dravidian folk religion ==
In Caribbean Shaktism in Guyana, Karuppuswamy is called Sangani Baba. In the Indo-Caribbean communities of Trinidad and Tobago, Guyana, Suriname, Guadeloupe, and Martinique, Sangani Baba is worshipped as a powerful god.

In Indo-Caribbean Shaktism, Sangani Baba is revered as a god who provides counsel and guidance. During festivals and special occasions, individuals chosen as oracles enter a trance-like state, known as Swami Adudhal. In this state, they channel the messages and advice of Sangani Baba to the assembled devotees, addressing their personal and community concerns.

Sangani Baba is often associated with the colour black, which symbolises his fierce and protective nature. He is considered a guardian god who offers his devotees protection, prosperity, and guidance. His worship in Indo-Caribbean Shaktism includes elements of Hinduism that have been passed down through generations.

Devotees offer various items to Sangani Baba as part of their worship, including Vedic items such as camphor, butter, cloves, and ghee. Non-Vedic offerings, such as cigarettes and alcohol, are also made to him in these regions.

Sacrifices of black chickens and black goats are made as part of rituals dedicated to Sangani Baba, symbolising the offering of life and the seeking of his blessings and favour.

== Annual festivals ==
The village committee decides when the annual festival is conducted. The time of year this occurs varies across villages and local customs. Generally, a mass convention assembly of a large number of related family members is organised in the spring for two days. The festival begins with the hoisting of a flag and the tying of a Kaappu. After this point, villagers cannot leave the village but other villages can still enter from should they wish. Once the festival ends, people may leave the village and go to another one.

== Forms ==
The 21 forms of Karuppannaswamy represent different roles, energies, and duties carried out by the same divine guardian. These forms are not "different gods", but rather different faces or modes of Karuppar, each suited for specific purposes such as protection, justice, healing, guarding, punishing, or guiding.

They derive from oral tradition, village worship, trance rituals (sami adudhal), and kuladeivam customs, rather than from Vedic or temple-based Agamic texts. Therefore, these forms may differ slightly between regions.

- Sappani Karuppannaswamy
- Muthu Karuppannaswamy
- Madhayanai Karuppasamy
- Sangili Karuppannaswamy
- Sonei Karuppannaswamy
- Vettai Karuppannaswamy
- Punugu Karuppannaswamy
- Mada Karuppannaswamy
- Aandi Karuppannaswamy
- Veera Karuppannaswamy
- Periya Karuppannaswamy
- Sameiya Karuppannaswamy
- Chinna Karuppannaswamy
- Khottai Karuppannaswamy
- Maaradi Karuppannaswamy
- Malaiyala Karuppannaswamy
- Aagaya Karuppannaswamy
- Maaya Karuppannaswamy
- Mandu Karuppannaswamy
- Maasaana Karuppannaswamy
- Santhana Karuppannaswamy
- Aathimarathu Karuppannaswamy

== See also ==
- Aiyanar
- Ayyappan
- Isakki
- Kali
- Karumariamman
- Mariamman
- Madurai Veeran
- Muneeswarar
- Sudalai Madan
