= Muneeswarar =

Hindu deity

Muniyandiswamy
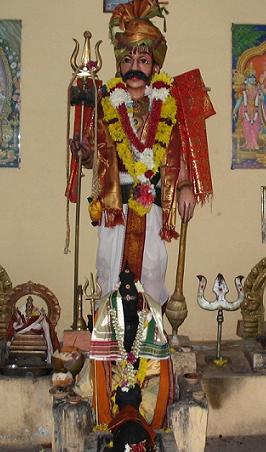
- murthi of Muniyandiswamy
- Other names: Muneeswaran; Muniyappan; Ayya; Appa; Muni
- Tamil: முனியாண்டிசாமி
- Affiliation: Dravidian folk religion; Avatar of Lord Shiva(folklore)
- Abode: Tamil Nadu, Deccan regions
- Weapon: Aruval,Trishula
- Symbol: Trishula
- Sacred flower: Jasmine
- Day: Tuesday, Wednesday
- Mount: Horse, Nandi
- Temples: Arulmigu Pandi Muneeswaran Temple, Maranadu.; Arulmigu Pathinettampadi Karuppannaswamy Temple, Alagar Kovil.
- Consort: Kateri Amman

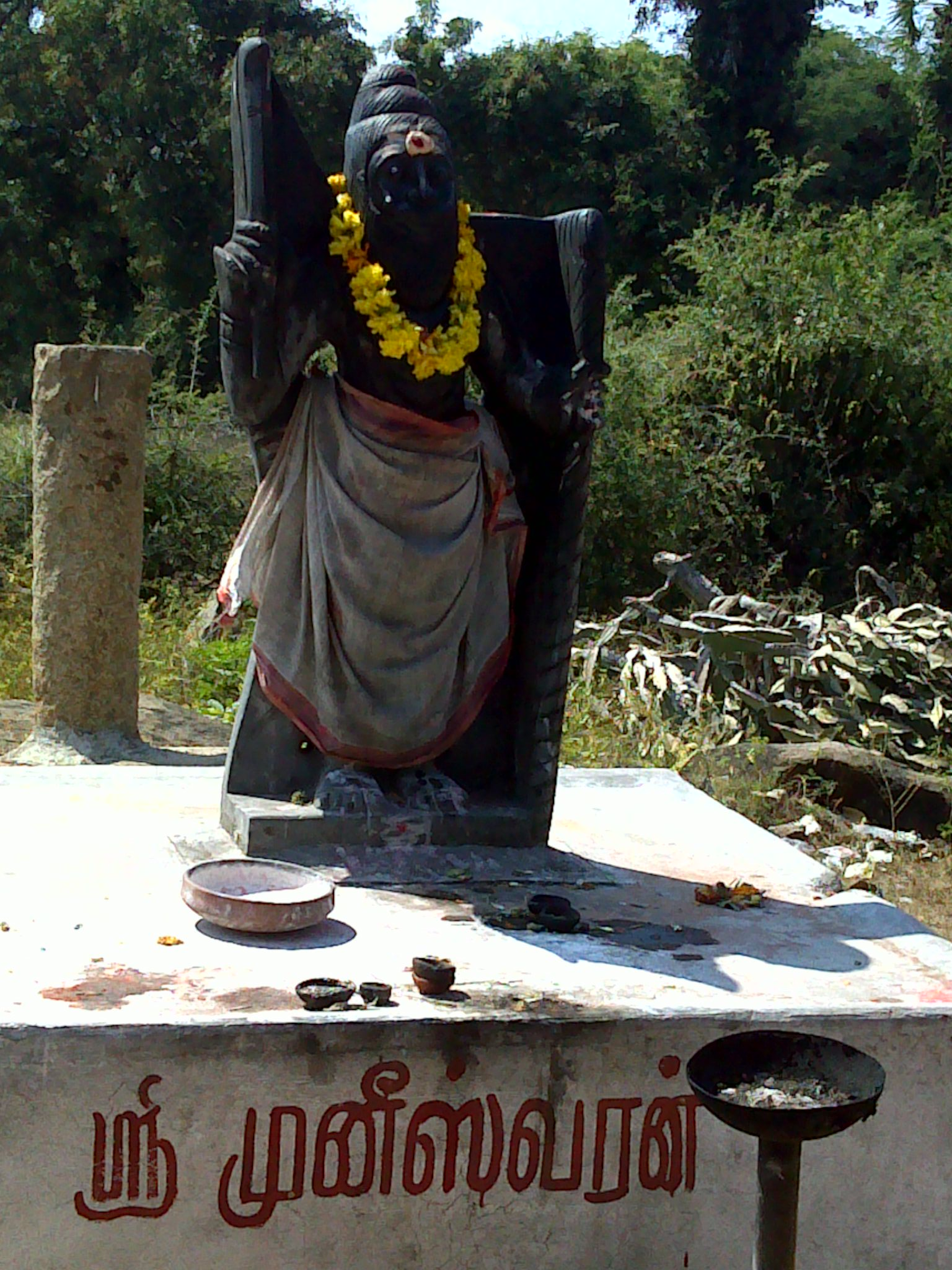
Muneeswarar murthi

Muneeswarar (also Muneeswaran, Munisvaran and Muniandi, Muniyandi, Muniyappan, Muni Ayya, Ayya amongst others) (Note: The word Muni[y]andi is a combination of two words, "muni" and "andi". The word andi can be defined in two ways. One referring to slave of God and the other ruling (as in ruler). The second explanation could be derived from the word Andavar, which literally means he who rules. The reason for this explanation is the word andi being used for other deities in the Hindu pantheon.) is a folk Hindu deity in South India, particularly Tamil Nadu. His name is a combination of "muni", sage or saint, and "ishvara", an epithet or title of Shiva. He is a rural guardian deity of plantations and estates. He is also recognised as a divine attendant to the major South Indian folk goddess Mariamman.

He is also worshipped by many in the Indian diaspora, in countries such as Malaysia, Singapore, Indonesia, Fiji.

== Depiction ==
Muneeswarar is often believed to be an old/middle aged male deity. He is often portrayed wearing a large moustache and wielding weapons such as a trident, Indian machete, whip and spear. His forehead and body is believed to be smeared with holy ash, an indication of his association with Shiva.

Muneeswaran is mostly worshipped in the form of statues (granite, metals, clay etc.) depicting his physical appearance, or merely in the form of the weapons he is associated with. In some cases, he is also worshiped in the form of a rock, brick, lamp or nothing at all. He is sometimes accompanied by other minor deities and animals (bulls, horses or dogs), which are believed to be his vehicles.

Muniandi is believed to be a member of Shiva's retinue. He is believed to be one of 7 emanations created from Shiva's face, and promised to guard Mariamman and other Hindu goddesses.

== History and legend ==
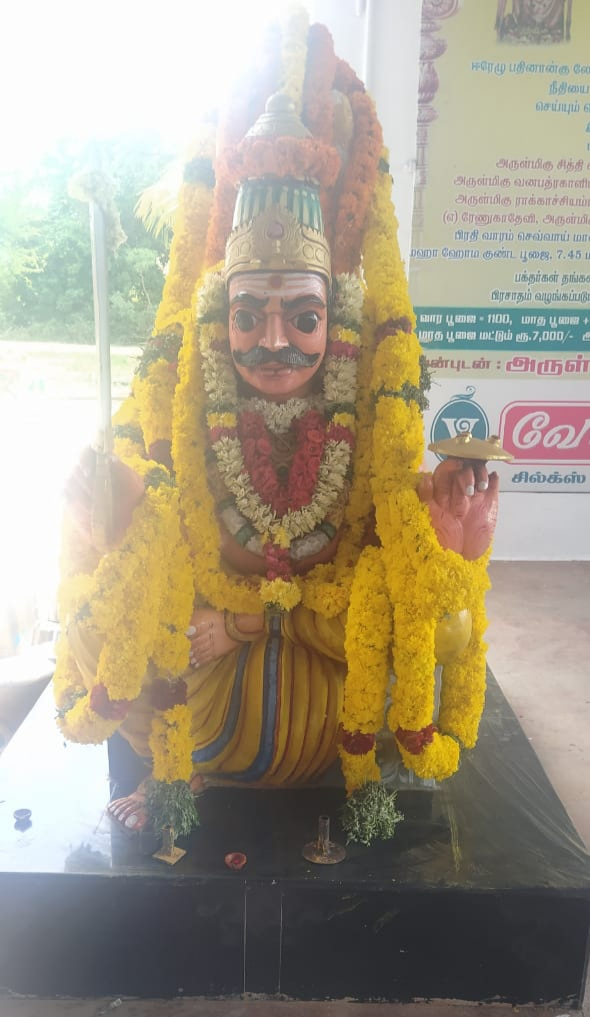
Muneeswarar

The history of Muneeshwaran and his worship remains ambiguous and unclear.

Muneeswarar is mostly considered a guardian or minor deity, but is in some cases is hierarchically considered to be on par with Shiva, one of the main deities in the Hindu trinity. Although not much is known about the exact origins and history of Muneeswarar, he is often related to Shiva. Some devotees and organisations closely related to the deity also acknowledge that Muneeswarar does not have a history. Their worship and faith stems from the deities miracles and current phenomena rather than from historical sources. Despite all these differing claims, almost all accept the strong relation between Muneeswarar and Shiva.

In some cases, Muneeswarar is believed to be created by Shiva. In others he is believed to be a form of Shiva. In some cases, he is seen to be Shiva himself. This can be seen in temples where Muneeswarar is depicted and worshipped in the exact same way as Shiva. Examples of this include the Sri Munishwaran temple in Singapore, where Muneesharan wears a snake around his neck and has the Nandhi (vehicle of Shiva) in front of him, just like Shiva.

In Hindu sacred texts such as the Vedas and Puranas, there is no explicit mention of the deity. However, it is sometimes suggested that Muneeswarar was present in most of these texts, but represented with a different name. Apart from this claim, most of the widely accepted histories of the deity stems from oral traditions, that have been passed down from one generation to another. Due to the lack of textual references, there is no way of verifying these claims and tracing their origins. Most of these oral histories, although not entirely the same, seem to share commonalities with many stories from Hindu texts. One such legend of the origins of Muneeswarar is that of the omission of Shiva from the Daksha Yajna, an elaborate ritual conducted by Dakshan, Shiva's father in law. Lord Shiva was enraged by this, causing multiple deities to be formed in the process. Muneeswarar was believed to be one of the deities that was formed. There are contrasting claims as to whether the deity was born from Shiva's face, his sweat or simply created by him. In another legend, Muneeswarar is considered to be a great devotee of Shiva who lived a long time ago, although the time is not specified. Muneeswarar pleased Shiva through his devotion, and thus the latter awarded him the title of "ishvara" and blessed him as a guardian deity.

== Different forms ==
In some cases, there seem to be more than one form of Muneeswarar, with each having his own respective characteristics and traits. The number of forms of Muneeswarar vary from 3, 7, 9, 18, 108 and even 1008 in some cases. The most common forms are Shiva Muni, Maha Muni, Gnana Muni, Paandi Muni, Dharma Muni, Naadha Muni, Jada Muni, Vaal Muni, Thava Muni. Most other forms of Muneeswarar are inspired from the above mentioned. In special cases, new forms of Muneeswarar are introduced based on the devotees perception, vision or dream of the deity. An example of this slightly altered form of the deity would be Sri Veera Muthu Muneeshwaran in Singapore, in which the deity is portrayed as a strong warrior.

In most cases, Muneeswarar is portrayed to be a fierce man, which supposedly is dedicated towards to the destruction of evil and other negative traits of humans alike. In other cases, Muneeswarar is portrayed in a peaceful manner, which supposedly denotes his spiritual and boon giving tendencies. Despite the difference in intensity, Muneeswarar is almost always seen wearing a long and thick moustache and holding weapons, like a trident, machete or whip.

== Worship ==
Muneeswarar is worshipped in both the orthodox Vedic ways as well as the Non-Vedic ways. The former is based heavily on the Vedas, Agamas and other sacred Hindu texts. Muneeswarar worship in this regard is usually done in an elaborate and systematic way, with many strict rules to be followed. For example, prayers and rituals are usually conducted in the Sanskrit language by Brahmins, and only vegetarian food products are offered to the deity for prayers and rituals. This method is mostly common in Agamic temples that are very common in India, Singapore and Malaysia. In such temples, Muneeswaran is venerated as a "higher" deity, and treated as Shiva himself.

The non-Vedic way on the other hand is less rigid and not heavily bounded to sacred texts like the Vedas and Agamas. Its worship methods sometimes involve the usage of many items and methods that are otherwise considered taboo in Vedic Hinduism. Theses include things such as animal sacrifices, the offerings of non-vegetarian food items, alcohol and tobacco. This form of worship sometimes also sees the innovation of deity through phenomenons like Alaipu or trance. This style of worships can be found in non-Agamic temples, shrines and homes. Due to the differences in worship methods, Muneeshwaran has a variety of disciples from many different demographics.

=== Tree worship (maram vazhipadu) ===
- The trees as such as banyan (ala maram), sacred fig (arasa maram) and palmyra (pana maram) are believed to be the gateways used by Muneeswarar to travel between different dimensions. Muneeswarar is also believed to reside in such trees. Tree worship is the oldest form of Muni worship.

=== Stone worship (nadukkal vazhipadu) ===
- Stone worship was mentioned even during Tamil Sangam ages more than 2,500 years ago. Nadukkal or veerarkal (for warriors) were planted to commemorate the death of someone important. In the Muni worship, it can be divided to either a single stone or three stones (or bricks), decorated with Shaivite sacred ash (vibuthi) marks, sandal paste (santhanam) and saffron paste (kungkumam). A trident (soolam) is planted as a mark of Shiva and Shakti.

=== Statue worship (Uruvam Vazhipadu) ===
- This is the most contemporary form of worship. Statues are erected and decorated to help the devotee visualise on the Muni. Other insignias such as sickle (aruval), sword and mace will be used depending on the type of Muni.

=== Worship outside India ===
Besides India, Muneeswarar worship is extremely popular in Singapore and Malaysia, with many shrines and temples dedicated to the deity. Most of these temples were initially set up by immigrants that came to Malaya from Tamil Nadu, particularly Thanjavur, Thiruvarur, Nagapattinam, Madurai and Salem, where the worship of the deity was prevalent. Newer temples of Muneeswarar were set up by descendants of these early Tamil migrants.

The deity is popular amongst this Tamil diaspora. In Malaysia, Muneeswarar worship was started by Tamil migrants who had the Muneeswarar as their Kula Deivam. The family temples which were built in the estates and villages later turned into public temples. Eventually, more people started worshipping these Muneeswarar and it became popularised.

Most shrines and temples started with the worship of simple religious objects that represented the deity, such as hero stones, tridents, small bricks or stones. As the temples developed over the years, they built more intricate and complex statues of the deity, which portrayed his physical features. Some of these statues are colourfully painted and taller than average human beings. Other temple structures, such as gopurams, were also developed and upgraded. Some of these small temples were converted into Vedic temples in the proceeding years. While this was the case for most temples, some temples continue in their original state.

Muneeswarar is sometimes worshipped along with deities from other religions such as Taoism and Buddhism. Countries like Singapore and Malaysia are home to people of many different cultures and faiths, which allows for the above mentioned phenomenon. In these instances, Muneeshwaran is seen as a contemporary to the deities of the various faiths. He is sometimes also venerated in different ways, including the offering Chinese joss sticks and food items.

== Trance ==
Trance is an important phenomenon that occurs in some forms of Muneeswarar worship, particularly the non-Vedic ones. This phenomenon essentially enables the deity to possess the body of a human, who then goes on to display physical traits of the deity. This is usually done at major festivals or prayers, and is considered to be a clear sign of the physical presence or blessing of the deity. Some practitioners willingly invoke the deity into their bodies, while for others it happens without their control. Trance is also used as a platform for devotees to communicate with the deity and vice versa, to provide solutions and advises for a multitude of topics.

This topic is highly controversial and does not have unanimous support. Some claim that Muneeswarar is god, who is above all human attributes and perceptions. Thus, it is impossible and not practical for him to possess people. Others on the other hand believe that his spirit is within the earthly realms, and thus it is possible for one to be possessed by him.

== See also ==
- Karuppuswamy
