= Ariyalur Block =

Revenue block of Tamil Nadu, India

Coordinates: 11°8′14″N 79°4′40″E

Ariyalur block is a revenue block of Ariyalur district of the Indian state of Tamil Nadu. This revenue block consist of 37 panchayat villages.

They are,

SI.No	Panchayat Village
1	Alanduraiyarkattalai
2	Andipattakkadu
3	Arungal
4	Edayathankudi
5	Erthukaranpatti
6	Govindapuram
7	Hasthinapuram
8	Illuppaiyur
9	Kadugur
10	Kallankurichi
11	Karuppilakattalai
12	Kavanur
13	Kayarlabath
14	Manakkal
15	Manakkudi
16	Melakkaruppur
17	Nagamangalam
18	Ottakoil
19	Periyathirukonam
20	Periyanagalur
21	Pottaveli
22	Pudupalayam
23	Pungankuzhi
24	Rayampuram
25	Reddipalayam
26	Sennivanam
27	Siruvalur
28	Srinivasapuram
29	Subburayapuram
30	Sundakudi
31	Thamaraikulam
32	Thavuthaikulam
33	Thelur
34	Usenabath
35	V.Krishnapuram
36	Valajanagaram
37	Villangudi
