= Nedumpura Kulasekharanellur Shiva Temple =

Shiva temple in Thrissur district, Kerala, India

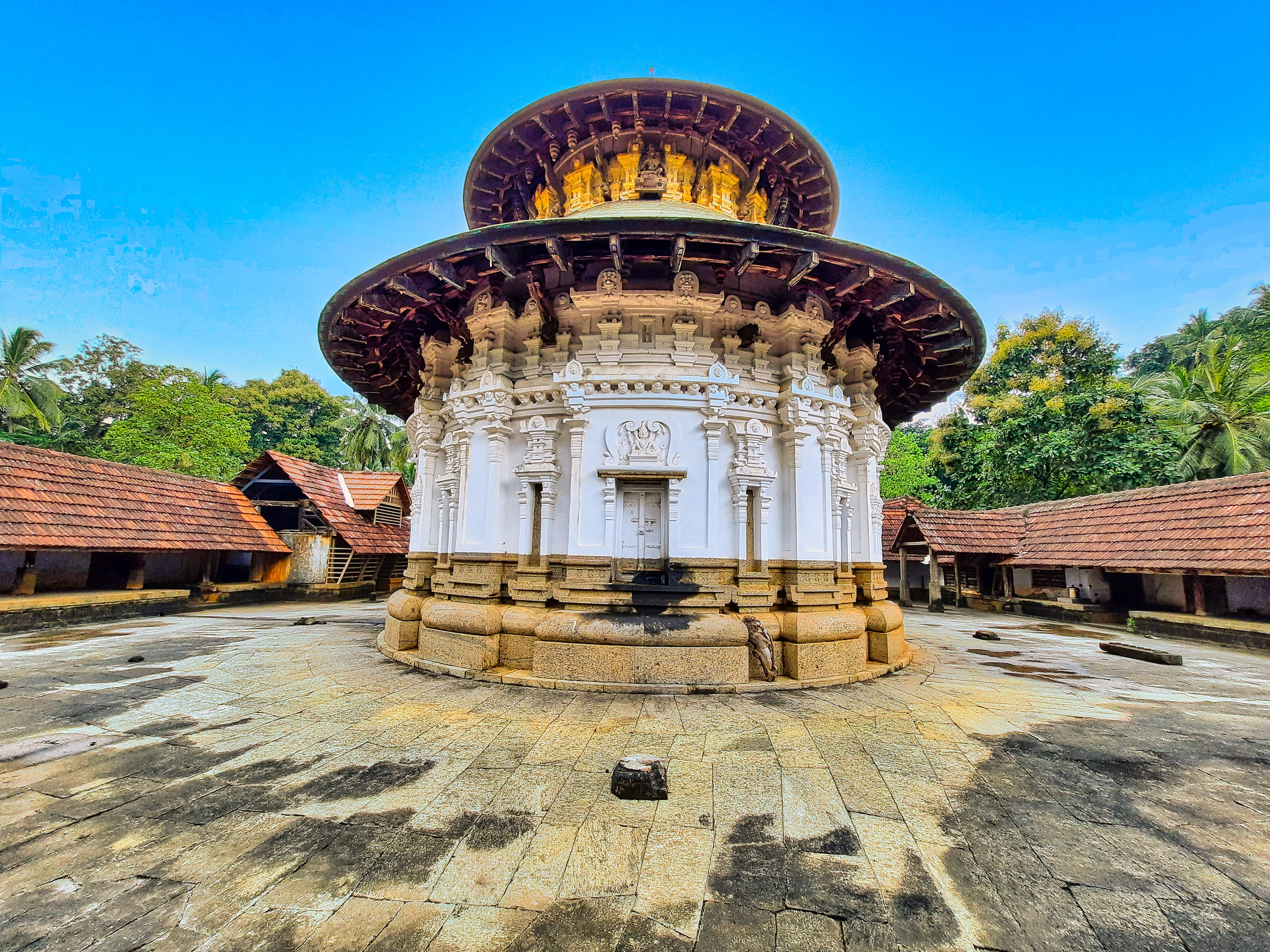
- Kulasekharanellur Shiva Temple, Nedumpura, Thrissur

- Kulasekharanellur Shiva Temple, Nedumpura, Thrissur, Kerala

Religion
- Affiliation: Hinduism
- District: Thrissur
- Deity: Shiva
- Festival: Maha Shivaratri

Location
- Location: Nedumpura, Thrissur
- State: Kerala
- Country: India
- Interactive map of Nedumpura Kulasekharanellur Shiva Temple
- Coordinates: 10.734655°N 76.261385°E

Architecture
- Type: Architecture of Kerala

Specifications
- Temple: One
- Elevation: 46.76 m (153 ft)

Kulasekharanellur Shiva Temple is a Shiva temple situated at Nedumpura neighbourhood in Thrissur in the state of Kerala, India. It is one among the 108 Shiva Temples in Kerala. The sanctum sanctorum of this temple is uniquely shaped as the back of an elephant (Gajaprishtam).

== Location ==
This temple is located with the coordinates of 10.734655°N 76.261385°E at Nedumpura in Thrissur district.

Nedumpura Kulasekharanellur Shiva Temple (Kerala)

== Sub deities ==
Krishna, Ganesha and Sastha are the sub deities in this temple.
