= Udayarpalayam =

- Town Panchayat
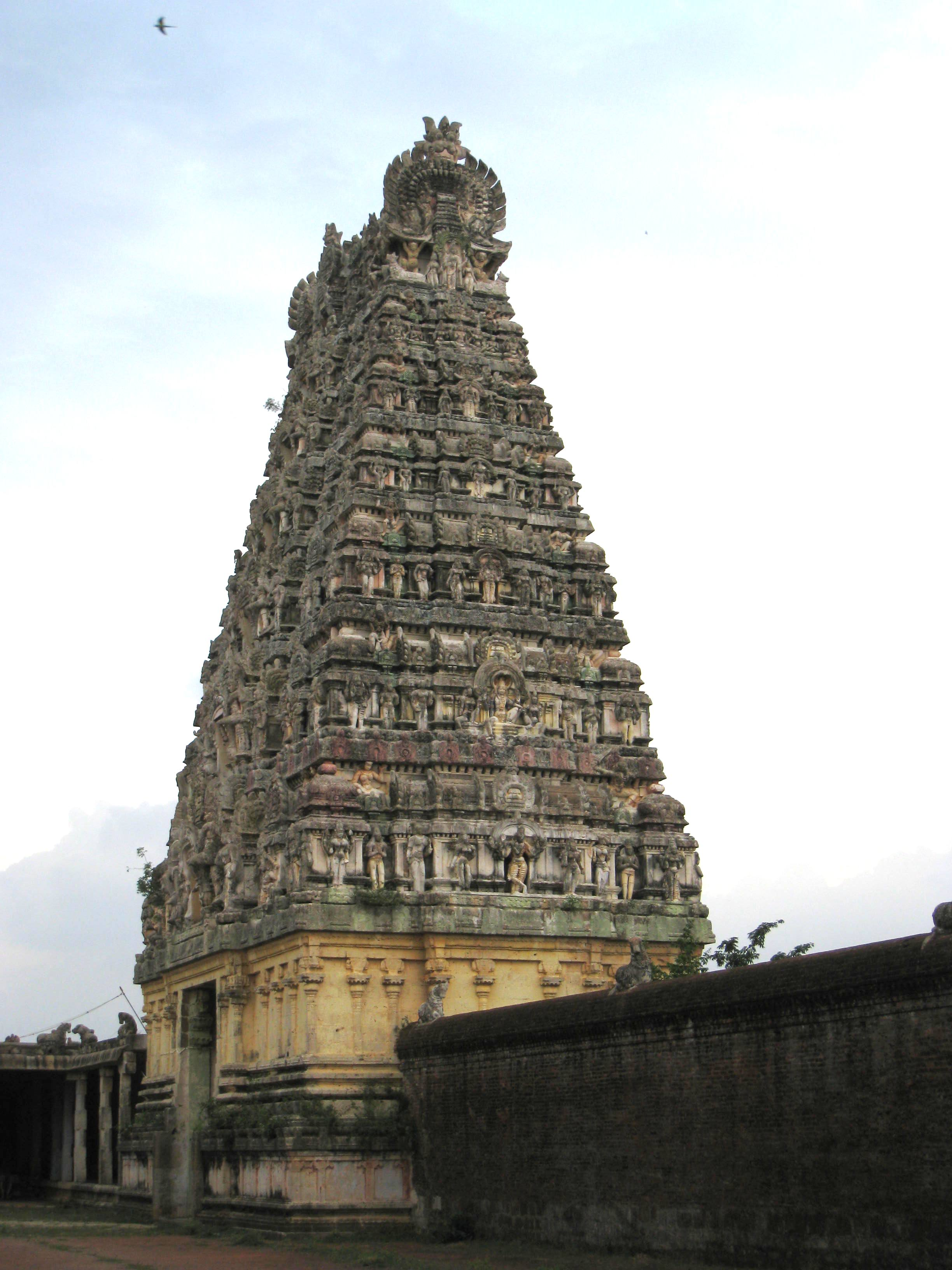
- Payarneeswarar temple

- Location in Tamil Nadu, India
- Coordinates: 11.1873°N 79.2931°E
- Country: India
- State: Tamil Nadu
- District: Ariyalur

Population (2001)
  - Total: 11,325

Languages
  - Official: Tamil
- Time zone: UTC+5:30 (IST)

Udayarpalayam is a panchayat town in the Ariyalur district of the Indian state of Tamil Nadu, near Jayankondam.

== Demographics ==
According to the 2001 Census of India, Udayarpalayam had a population of 11,325 people, with males making up 51% and females 49%. The town recorded an average literacy rate of 62%, which was above the national average of 59.5%. Literacy among men stood at 73%, while for women it was 52%. Additionally, children below the age of six accounted for 13% of the population.

Udayarpalayam was established as a village panchayat in 1886. Later, through a government order issued on 7 July 2006, it was elevated to a Grade I Town Panchayat. The town panchayat is organized into 15 wards, each represented in the council. Administrative functions are overseen by an Executive Officer of the Town Panchayat, while Jayankondam serves as the headquarters of the Udayarpalayam Taluk.

== More information ==
Udayarpalayam was ruled by many kings in the history such as Early Cholas, Kalabhras, Pallavas, Medieval Cholas, Later Cholas, Later Pandyas, Delhi Sultanate, Madurai Sultanate, Vijayanagar Empire, Gingee Nayaks , Kalatka Thola Udayars, Arcot Nawabs and British Raj.

It has many government and private schools and education institutes also.

The main occupations of this town is agricultural, fishing, and hand looms

The soil type found here is predominantly while red loam, clay loam & black cotton varieties are widely common in the outer edge of the city.

The major crop is paddy rice; other crops include millet, legumes, oil seed, sugarcane and cotton.

Its temperatures in summer reaches, 40 C max. & 26.3 C min., although temperatures more than 42 C are very common. Winter temperatures lie from 29.6 C to 18 C.

== History ==
.Udayarpalayam was initially a small principality under the suzerainty of the Vijayanagara empire and Gingee Nayaks.The zamindari system existed still 1956, Chinnanalla Udayar, was the last Zamindar, who ruled till 1956. Even now their successors are found in the town. The town has a large palace and a temple and temple tank within its premises.

== Location ==
Udayarpalayam is 255 km from Chennai.

On the south around 29 km from kumbakonam via Neelathanallur-Mathanathur bridge.

On the east and 30 km from Ariyalur.

On the North 33 km from Srimueshnam. On the North and 44 km from Viruthachalam.

On the east and 58 km from away Chidambaram.

Udayarpalayam Town limit extends over an area of 12 km^{2}.

== Locational Advantage ==
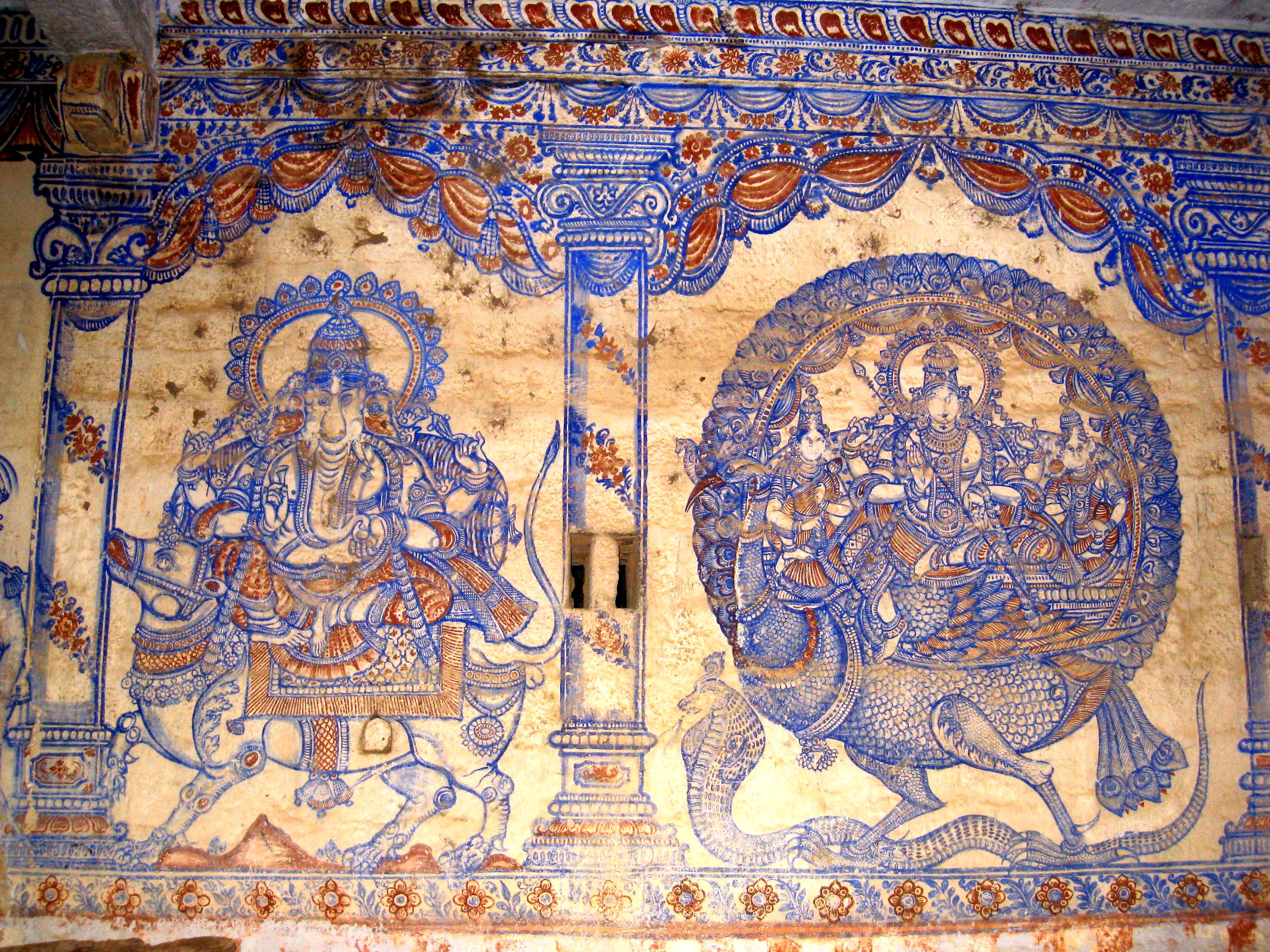
Murals in Payarneeswarar Temple, Udayarpalayam, Tamil Nadu

Udayarpalayam town is located at a distance of 45 km from the district headquarters on the State Highway (SH 4), which runs form Tiruchirappalli to Chidambaram.

The town is located at a distance of 85 km on the north eastern side of Tiruchirappalli.

The other towns of the region namely, Ariyalur, Virudhachalam, Kumbakonam, Tanjore and Perambalur are located within a distance of 50 km from the town and are well connected by state and private run buses.

The town is also connected to all the parts of the state. Ariyalur is the nearest railway station and is 28 km from the town.

== Tourism Importance ==
As far as tourism potential of the town is concerned, the historic monuments and the heritage elements which are to be utilized to optimum levels and included in the tourist circuit of the region.

The palace and the Payarneeshwarar temple are the major attractions of the town. Payarneeshwarar temple is one of the oldest Shiva temples in the state, dating back to 1400 years, quite older than Thanjavur Prahadeeshwarar temple.

There are large numbers of tourist places, namely Gangaikonda Chozhapuram, Chidambaram; Thanjavur etc., located within a radius of 100 km of the town.

== Nearby cities and towns ==
- Gangaikonda cholapuram
- Jayamkondam
- Kallankurichi
