= Pavadairayan =

Dravidian folk deity

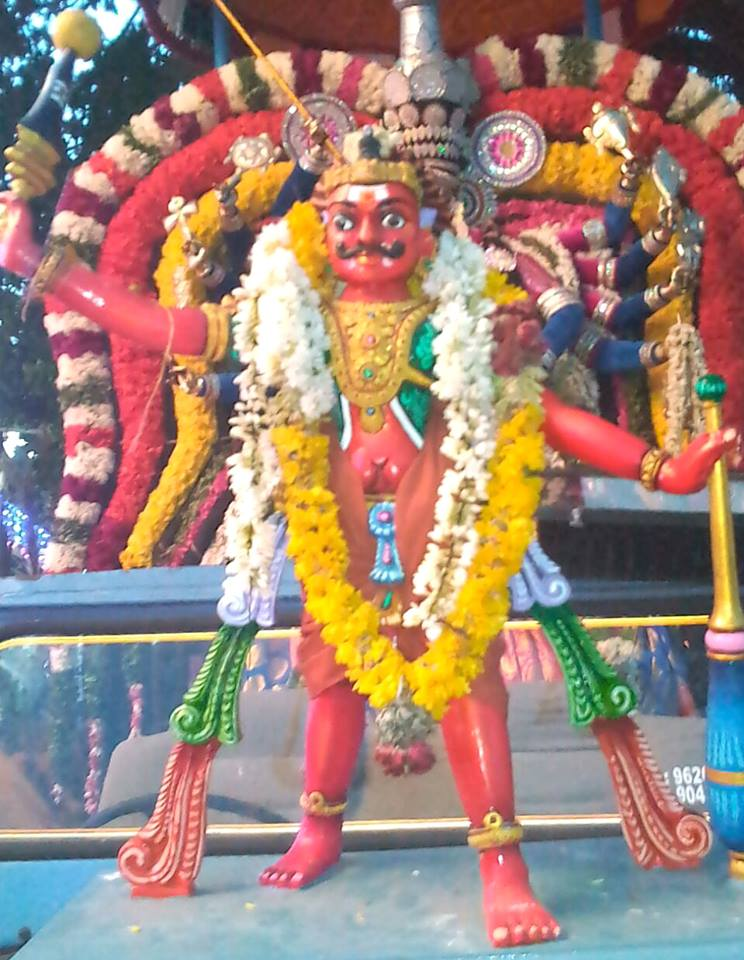
- The deity at a festivity for Angalamman
- Venerated in: Dravidian folk religion
- Region: Tamil Nadu

Pavadairayan is a Tamil folk and Hindu deity worshipped in rural Tamil Nadu. He is considered to be a kaval deivam, and best recognised for serving as a general for the deity Aiyanar.

== Legend ==
The deity is associated with the myth of the Mayana Kollai, where he accompanies Angala Parameshvari, an aspect of Parvati, to slay a demon that lurked in a cremation ground.

Pavadairayan is also often described to be a sea god who is venerated by adherents along with their adherence to mainstream Shaivism.

== Iconography ==
As a kaval deivam deity, the deity is usually placed outside the sannadhi of the central deity. Pavadairayan is unique in the fact that he is the only entity who has been portrayed sitting on the lap of Angala Parameshvari.

== Worship ==
As a village deity, Pavadairayan is worshipped mostly through stones and trees. In several Angala Parameswari's temples, Pavadairayan has a separate sannidhi. There are only a few temples dedicated to Pavadairayan.

According to local tradition, the place where Pavadairayan lived was called Rayampuram before being renamed Royapuram. The place where Pavadairayan served as a protector for Kali is Royapuram, at the Kalmandapam Angalaparameswari Amman Temple.

== See also ==
- Village deities of Tamil Nadu
- Angala Parameshvari
- Aiyanar
