= Siruvalur (Ariyalur) =

Coordinates: 11°8′24″N 79°4′43″E

Siruvalur Ariyalur
- village
- Interactive map of Siruvalur Ariyalur
- Country: India
- State: Tamil Nadu
- District: Ariyalur

Population (2011)
  - Total: 2,479

Languages
  - Official: Tamil
- Time zone: UTC+5:30 (IST)
- PIN: 621704
- Vehicle registration: TN-61
- Coastline: 0 kilometres (0 mi)
- Sex ratio: 1125 ♂/♀
- Literacy: 77.13%
- Lok Sabha constituency: Chidambaram (Lok Sabha constituency)
- Climate: Normal (Köppen)
- Avg. summer temperature: 36 °C (97 °F)
- Avg. winter temperature: 22 °C (72 °F)

Siruvalur is a village in Ariyalur district, Tamil Nadu, India. The village has its own government high school which it is planning to upgrade to a higher secondary school. Siruvalur is located at 1.5 km from National Highway 81 (India) Trichy to [Chidambaram]. Siruvalur is located 10 km away from district headquarters Ariyalur.

== Demographics ==
As per the 2011 census, Siruvalur had a population of 2,479 with 1,177 males and 1,302 females.

== Temples ==
This village is surrounded by many temples. Lord Shiva, Vinayagar, Mariamman, and Ellaiamman temples are located in a single complex near the entrance. The other side of the village has another temple complex. Within it are the Dhraupadiamman, Karupusami, Aiyanar, and Vallalar adigal temples. A separate temple for Karupusami is located in the north of the village.

== Community ==
The village consists of Udyar, Reddiyar, and Vaniyar communities.

== Economy ==
The economy of Siruvalur is mainly based on agriculture. Most of the population in the village depends on agriculture. Some of them are employed in the cement factories around the village on daily wage. The main cultivation is paddy, cotton, maze, sugar cane, and the Casuarina Tree. Siruvalur has two rivers flowing parallel to it. One is originating in Mathura Kaliamman Temple, Siruvachur and another is from Kallankurichi Kaliyuga Varatharaja Perumal temple. These two rivers join together in Siruvalur to flow as a single river that joins with Kollidam river. Many educated young people work in cities like Chennai and Bangalore. Also some people work in Singapore and the Middle East.
