= Reddipalayam =

Coordinates: 17°10′N 78°19′E

- village
- Interactive map of Reddipalayam
- Country: India
- State: Tamil Nadu
- District: Ariyalur

Population (2001)
  - Total: 3,571

Languages
  - Official: Tamil
- Time zone: UTC+5:30 (IST)
- Vehicle registration: TN-
- Coastline: 0 kilometres (0 mi)
- Sex ratio: 949 ♂/♀
- Literacy: 51.27%

Reddipalayam is a village in the Ariyalur taluk of Ariyalur district, Tamil Nadu, India.

== Demographics ==
As of 2001 census, Reddipalayam had a total population of 3571 with 1832 males and 1739 females.

This place is famous for its rich limestone deposits and therefore India's one of the largest cement producer, UltraTech Cement Ltd, (Aditya Birla Group) has a plant (RdCW) here with production capacity of about 4000 tonnes of cement per day. Most people of this village depend solely on the company for their livelihood either by working in the factory or by running petty businesses like tea shop, hotel etc. A large number of trucks are seen here and as a result, there are automobile garages also.

It is 12 km away from its district headquarters, Ariyalur. 70 km away from Trichy and 47 km away from Tanjore.

Places nearby: Jayankondam - 25 Km, Gangaikonda Cholapuram - 36 km, Chidambaram - 75 km

It is a part of the latest formed district in the state. Moderate climate. Easily accessible by road and rail. State run buses are available round the clock. The bus stop is near V.Kaikaati (vilaangudi kaikaati) where one can get buses 24 hours towards Chennai, Trichy and Tanjavore. V.kaikaati is a place of intersection of state's busiest roads Trichy- Chidambaram and Ariyalur- Muttuvaancherry (SH139) roads. V.Kaikatti is a largest Revenue place in Reddipalayam.
