= Ayyanayake =

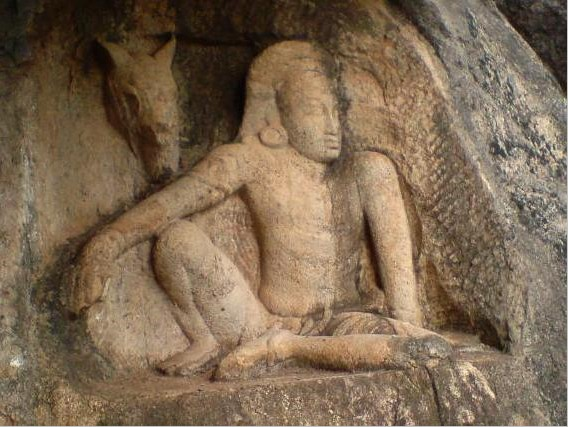
Ayyanayake in Isurumuniya with horse

In Sinhala Buddhist beliefs, Ayyanayake is a village guardian deity and is another name of Aiyyanar, a deity worshipped by the Tamil people. He is usually depicted with a huge horse statue. He is depicted of having eight avatars (Ashta Shastha) and the most prominent one being Ayyappan or also known as Dharma Shasta. This statue is possibly made by the King Buwanekabahu IV (1341–1351 AD), the first king of Gampola. This form of Shasta is known as "Maha Shasta" Or just Shasta. This deity is prominently worshiped in South India. This was made Pre-Buddhist period.
