= Siruvachur =

Coordinates: 11°11′N 78°52′E

- village
- Location in Tamil Nadu, India
- Country: India
- State: Tamil Nadu
- District: Perambalur

Languages
  - Official: Tamil
- Time zone: UTC+5:30 (IST)
- PIN: 621113
- Vehicle registration: TN-46
- Nearest city: Perambalur

Siruvachur is a small village located in the Perambalur district of Tamil Nadu, India.

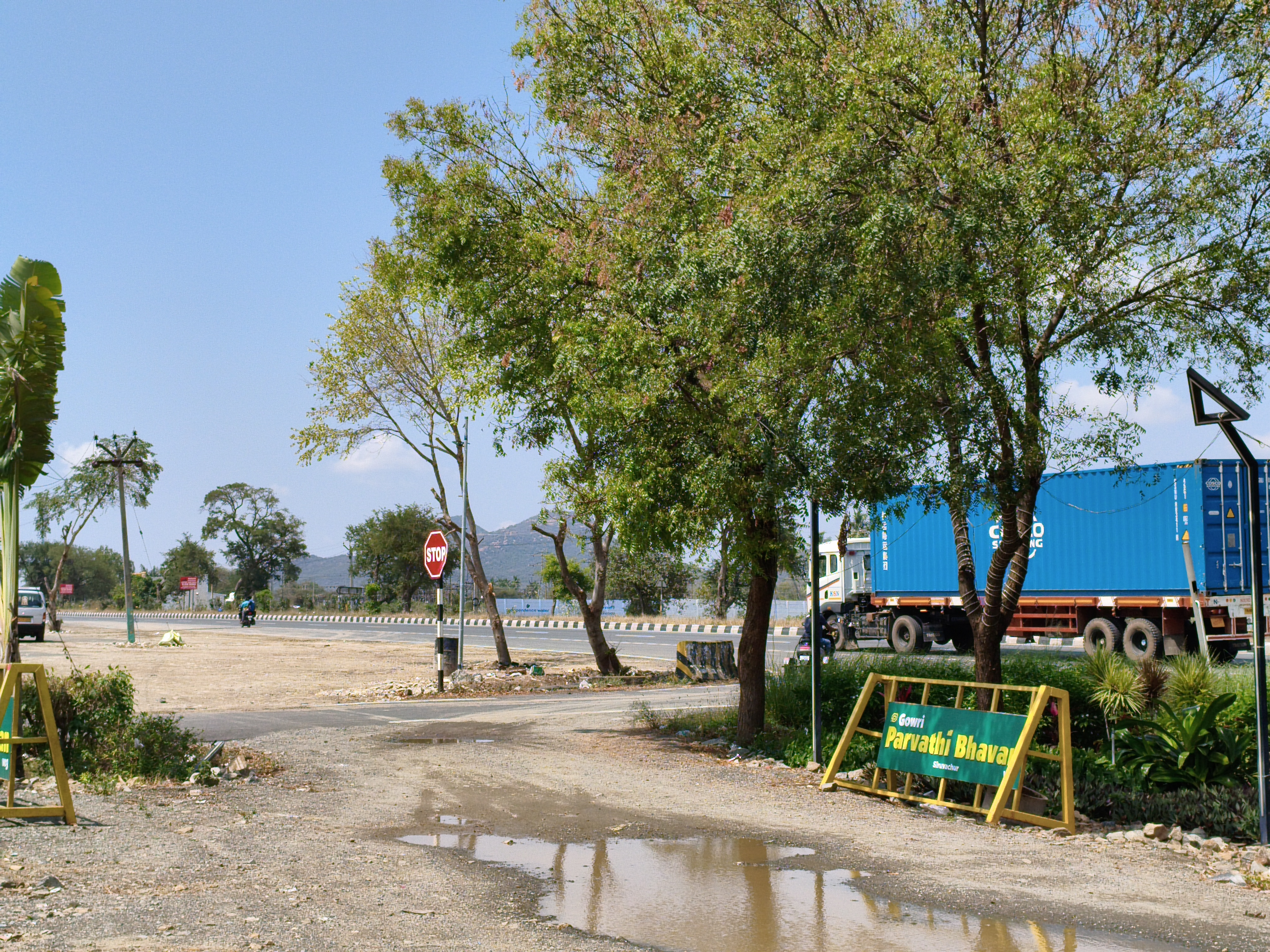
National Highway in Siruvachchur

== Location ==
Siruvachur is 7 km away from district headquarters, Perambalur district, and 280 km away from state capital Chennai.

== Demographics ==
As of 2011 Siruvachur had a population of 5,616 with a literacy rate of 78%.

== Economy ==
Agriculture was the key development that led to the rise of human civilization in Siruvachur. Agricultural progress has been a crucial factor in socio-economic change of people in Siruvachur and nearby villages. The cultivation of cotton, sugarcane, groundnuts, corn and sweet potatoes are commonly seen; these are considered as lucrative cash crops. Food crops like rice and vegetables are grown in abundance.

There is a weekly wholesale auction of vegetables, fruits, food crops and cash crops, textiles, agricultural instruments, at the market on every Friday from 2PM to 10PM and special market days are organised during festival season. Dairy farming has long been present in the area and there are several cooperative dairies both government and private funded functioning to collect milk.

Harvester machines are used to cultivate paddy fields and corn.

== Education ==
Three higher secondary schools are available: Bharathi vidyalaya matriculation higher secondary school, Classic matriculation higher secondary school and Government higher secondary school.

== Religion ==
The village is home to the Mathura Kaliamman Temple and the Maariyaman Temple.
