= Aiyanar =

Hindu folk deity

- Guardian deity
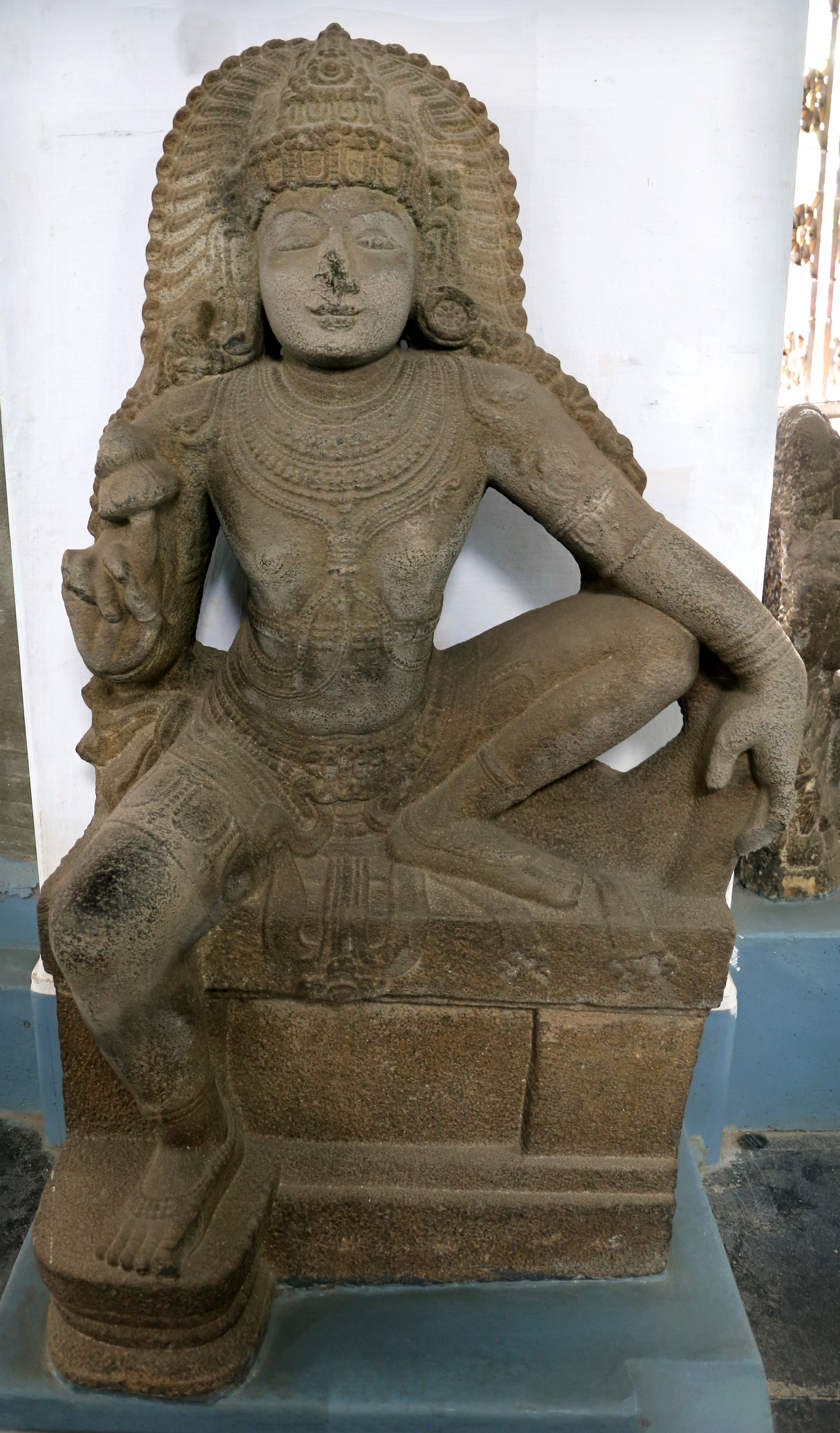
- Chola statue of Ayyanar
- Affiliation: Ayyappan
- Weapon: Chentu (whip), sceptre, sword
- Mount: White elephant, horse, bull
- Consort: Puranai, Puskalai

Aiyanar (IAST: Aiyaṉār, Tamil: ஐயனார்) is a Tamil Hindu folk deity venerated in South India and Sri Lanka. His worship is prevalent amongst rural Tamil people. Some studies suggest that Ayyanar may have also been worshipped in Southeast Asian countries in the past. He is primarily worshipped as one of the village deities of Tamil Nadu. Temples to Aiyanar in the countryside are usually flanked by gigantic colourful statues of him and his companions riding horses or elephants.

== Etymology ==
The Tamil word Ayyanār is derived from the root word Ayya, a honorific used in a Tamil language to designate respected one. Some people propose that Aryan could be the Sanskrit version of Tamil word Aiyyan which means the same. There is a well known temple dedicated to Sastha situated in a village of Kerala, called "Aryankavu". Another name of Ayyanar, Sastha, meets the same dispute. Although he appears as Sastha in Sanskrit scriptures, ancient Tamil records mention him as Chattan (சாத்தன், Cāttaṉ).

== Development ==
There are very few pieces of evidence to reconstruct the origin and development of Ayyanar. Some researchers assume Chattan could have entered the Tamil country with Buddhism. The earliest references to Ayyanar were discovered in the hero stones of hunting chieftains from Arcot, Tamil Nadu dated back to the 3rd century C.E. The phrase in the inscriptions which could be translated into "Ayyanappan; a shrine to Cattan" confirms that Ayyan and Chattan were the names of a single deity. A rock carving of a man and horse in the Isurumuniya Buddhist temple of Sri Lanka, is identified with Ayyanar. Sinhala Buddhists of Sri Lanka praise him in the form of a folk deity called Ayyanayake to the date.

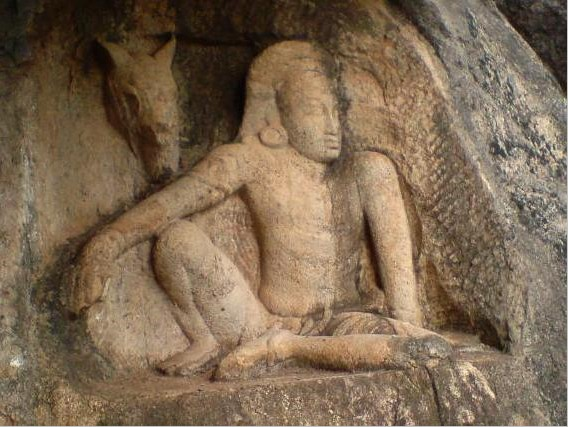
5th century CE Isurumuniya sculpture often identified with Ayyanayake, Sri Lankan Ayyanar.

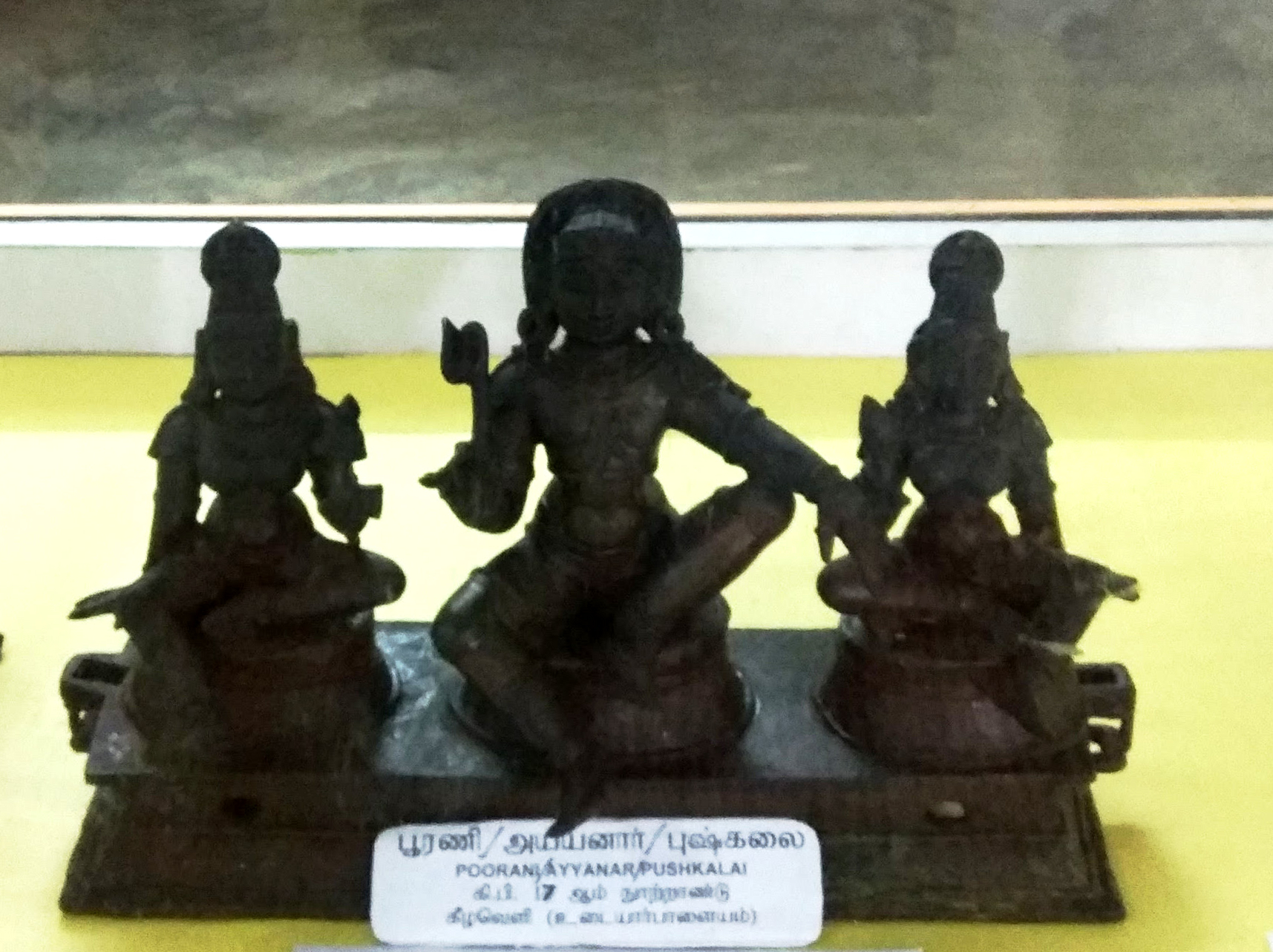

=== Sanskrit Sources ===
Sastha started to appear in Sanskrit sources from the 7th century CE after Brahmanda Purana. It narrates the history of Hariharasuta, son of Hari and Hara, who was born to Shiva during his copulation with Mohini, the feminised form of Vishnu, after the churning of the milk sea. Sivagama corpus of southern Shaiva Siddhanta including Pūrva Kāraṇa, Amṣūmatbhēda, Suprabhēda, also have many references to the iconography of Sastha. Other Hindu Saivite texts viz. Ishana Siva Guru Paddhati, Kulala Sastragama and Shilparatna explain his worship and iconography briefly.

=== Tamil Sources ===
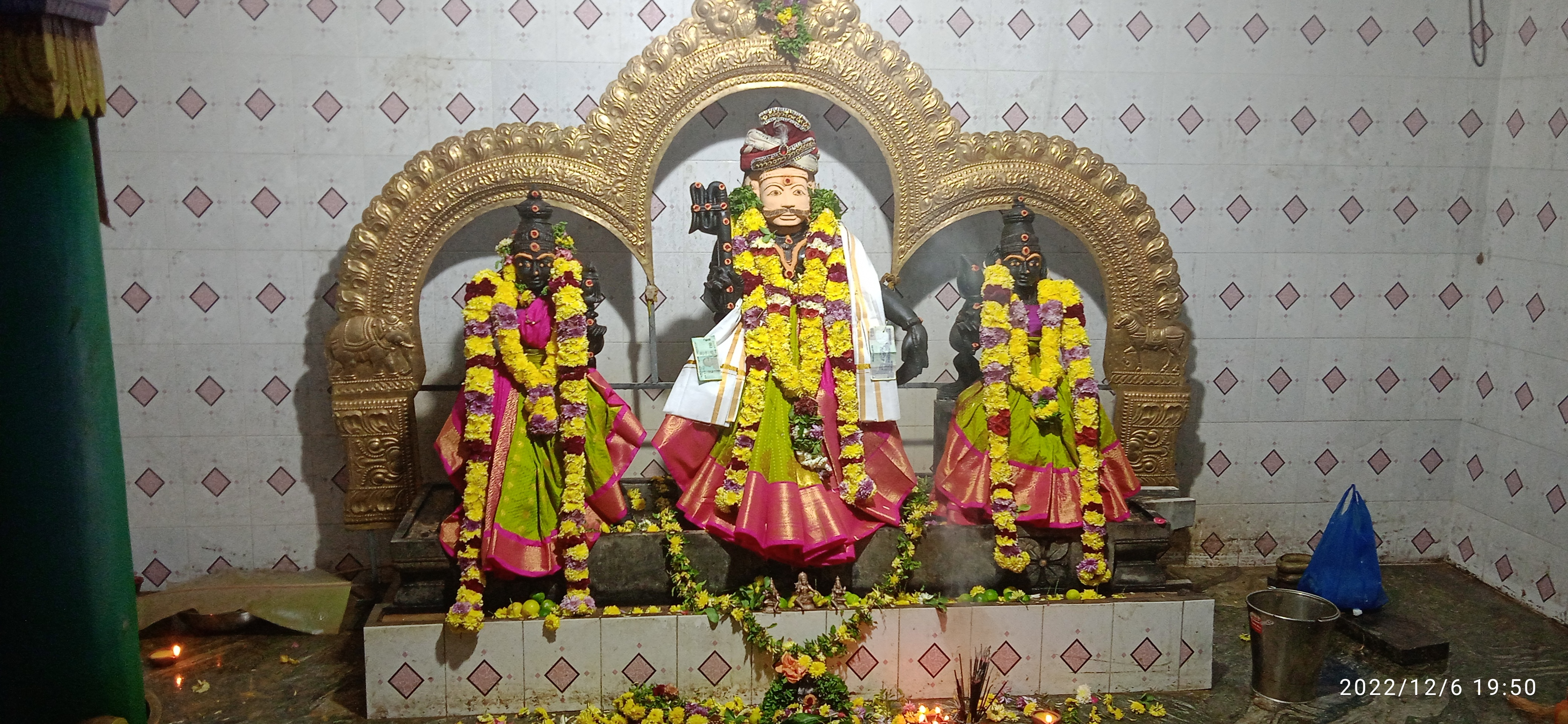

According to Fred Clothey, Aiyanar is a Tamil adaptation of Aiyan, the chief deity of Ay chieftains who ruled parts of Kerala and Tamil Nadu, the then Tamilakam. He also states that the term aayar meaning a cow herder and a protector is an appropriate appellation for both the Ay chieftains and their clan deity. Tamil Sangam literature often mention poets and traders with the name Chattan, who might have revered Sastha as their clan deity.

Tamil epic Silappatikaram, probably dated to the 4th century CE, records the temples and devotees of Cattan. Appar (7th century CE), Saivite Nayanar and one of the initiators of the Tamil Bhakti movement, praises Shiva as the father of Chattan in his Tevaram (Tirumurai, 4:32:4). Periya Puranam, a Tamil Saivite epic of the 12th century CE tells that Aiyanar at Tiruppidavur revealed the Tamil song of Cheraman Perumal, a Nayanar-cum -Chera king (800—844 CE) which was composed at Madhya Kailash. From the Chola period (9th century) onwards the popularity of Aiyanar became even more pronounced and so many bronze images of him are available from this period. Tamil Nighantus (proto-glossaries) such as Piṅkalantai (11th century CE) and Cūṭāmaṇi Nighaṇṭu (1520 CE) have explicitly recorded the characteristics of Sastha.

Kanda purānam, 14th century Tamil version of Skanda Purana narrates the history of Aiyanar in Maha chattan patalam which seconds the story told in Brahmanda purana. Here Ayyan, Kanda puranam tells, sends his chief commander Mahakala to protect Indrani from the demon Surapadman. Mahakala chops down the hands of Ajamukhi, sister of Surapadman, who tried to abduct Indrani for her brother.

== Iconography ==
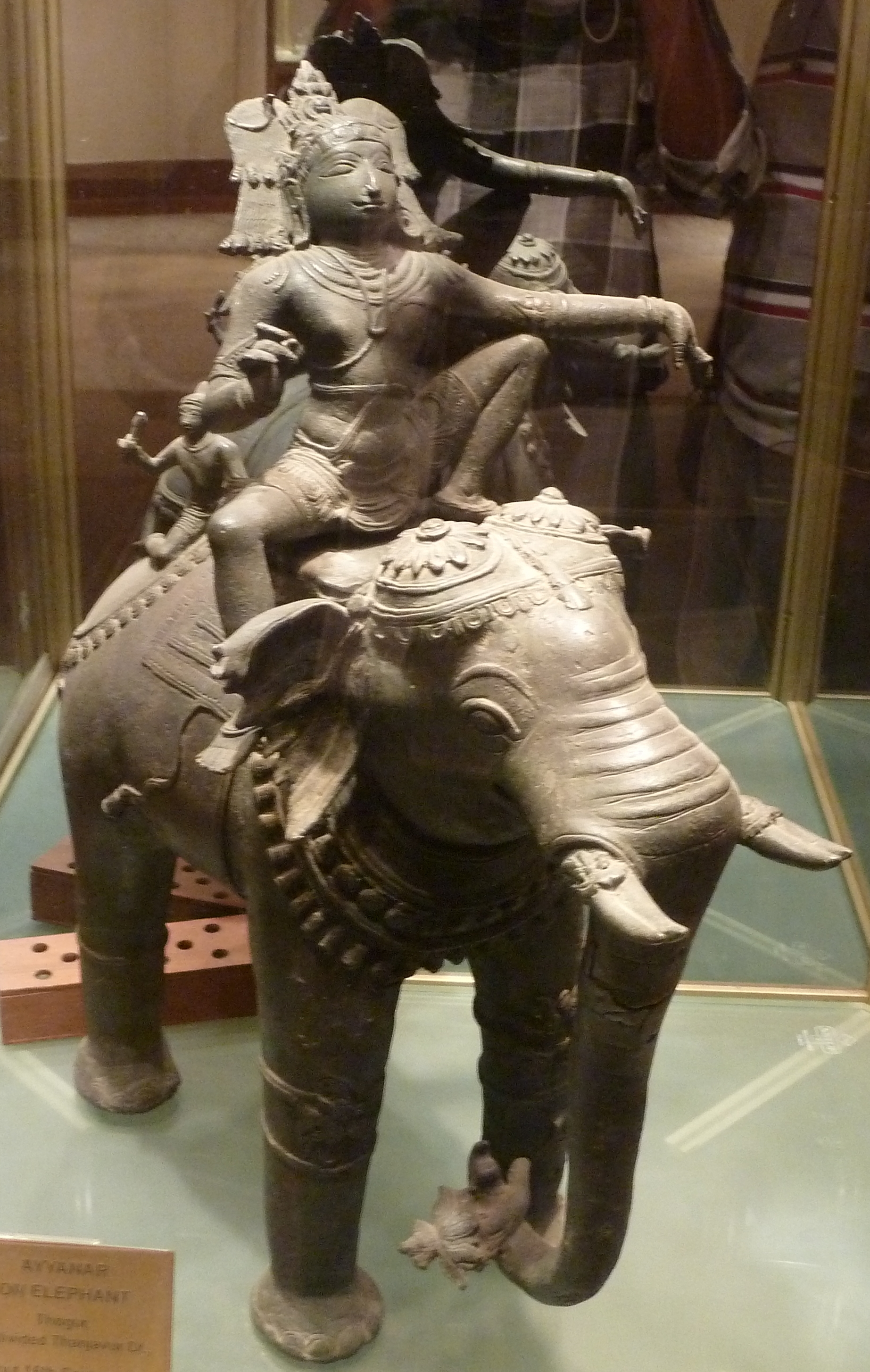
Bronze statue of Ayyanar on an elephant, 16th century CE, Tamil Nadu

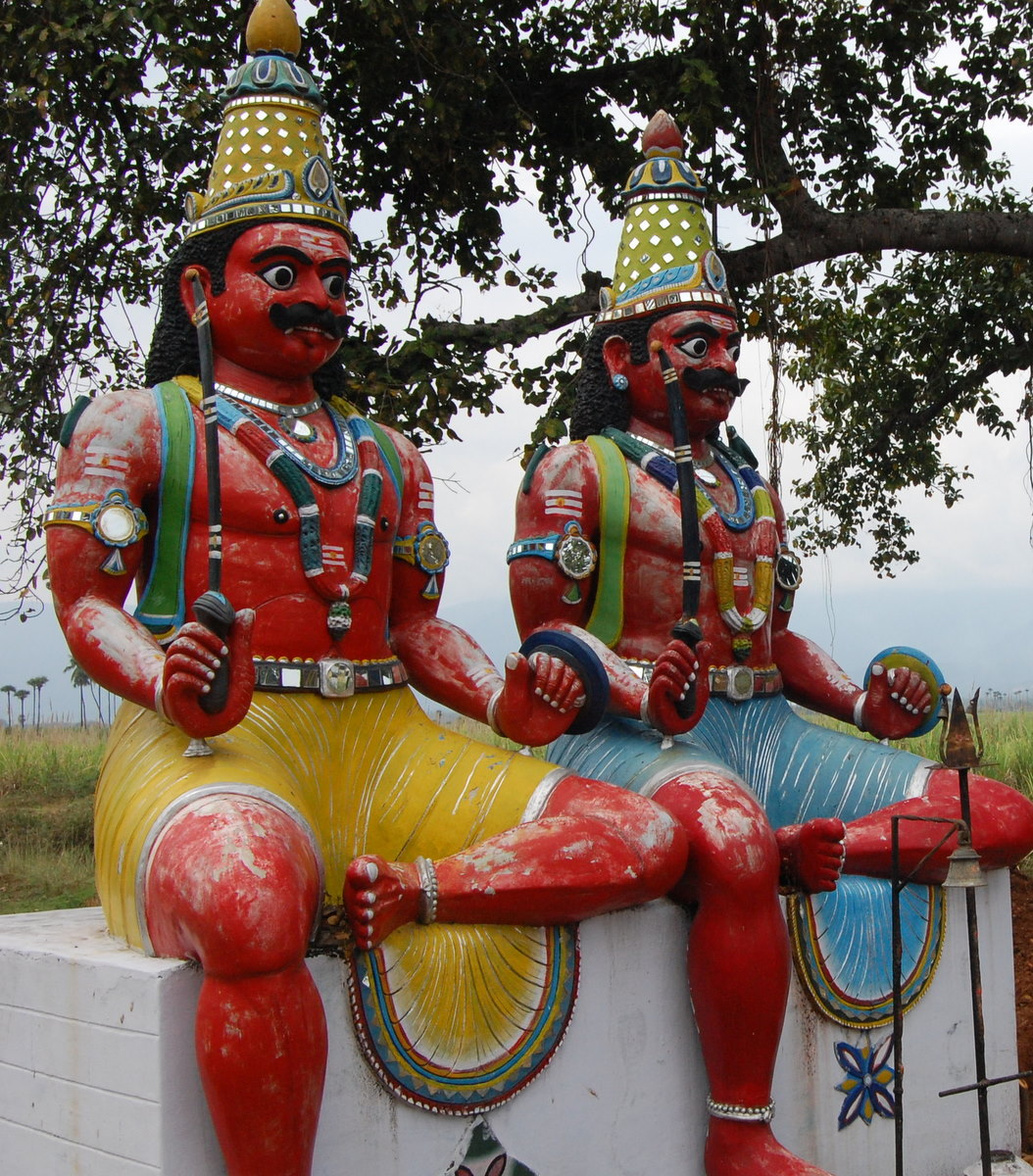
Ayyanar in wrathful guardian form shares Tantric iconography with Bhairava who safeguards the devotee in eight directions (ettu tikku) as well as with Vajrayana guardian deities like Acala.

The famous iconography of Aiyan shows him alone, carrying a Chentu (செண்டு, crooked stick) in his right hand. Sometimes a whip, stick, sword or scepter can be seen in his hand. While he manifests in a squat position, A meditation band known as Yogapaţţam or Vāgupaţţai will present around his knees and waist. Pingalantai Nighantu, Kanda Puranam and Chola bronzes describe his mount as a white elephant. The horse is another mount abundantly seen in his local temples. Some texts have mentioned the blue horse and bull as his mount as well. After the popularity of the Ayyappan cult, the tiger is also identified as the mount of Sastha.

According to Cūṭāmaṇi Nighaṇṭu, Sastha wears black garments and reddish garlands. His body is smeared with yellow paste and he carries a sword in his hand. In Kārana Agama, he sits on a throne with his right leg folded while his left leg is hanging down. He is usually depicted having blue or black complexion. Although his two armed form is common, some texts describe his forms with four or eight arms. Amsumadbheda Agama describes his four arms carrying Abhaya, Varada, sword and shield. In Ishana Siva Guru Paddhati, he is visualized as carrying an arrow, bow, knife and sword.

Other records on Ayyanar tell that he is accompanied by his two wives popularly known as Purana and Pushkala. Purna (on his right) is dark complexioned and carries Varamudra in her right hand and blue lotus in the left. Pushkala (on his left) is yellow complexioned and holds a noose in her right hand. Shilparatna describes him with only one wife called Prabha and their eight years old lad known as Satyakan

Folklore regards Aiyan as the guardian of the villages, riding on either an elephant or horse. He carries a bow and arrow to save his devotees. Pavadairayan, Karuppasamy are his attendants. Aiyanar images installed in villages are usually gigantic and they are identical with the Bhuta like iconography of Sastha given in Subrabheda Agama. In rural areas, Aiyanar is often represented with an escort, usually composed of the god's vassals, sometimes comprising demons. Consistent with this practice, terracotta horses are usually placed outside the temple. These are given up to the god as steeds for his night time perambulations.

== Connections with Ayyappan ==
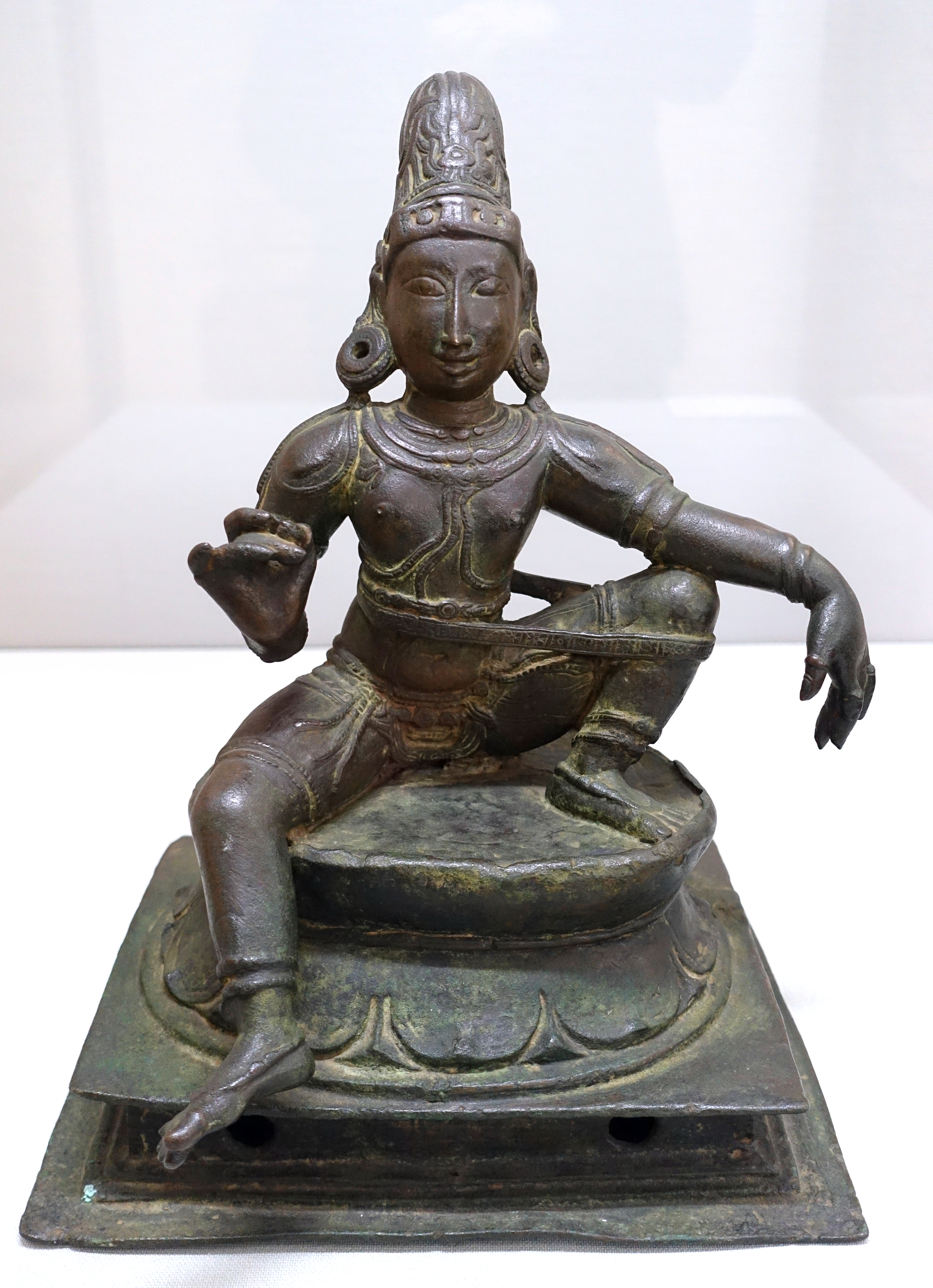
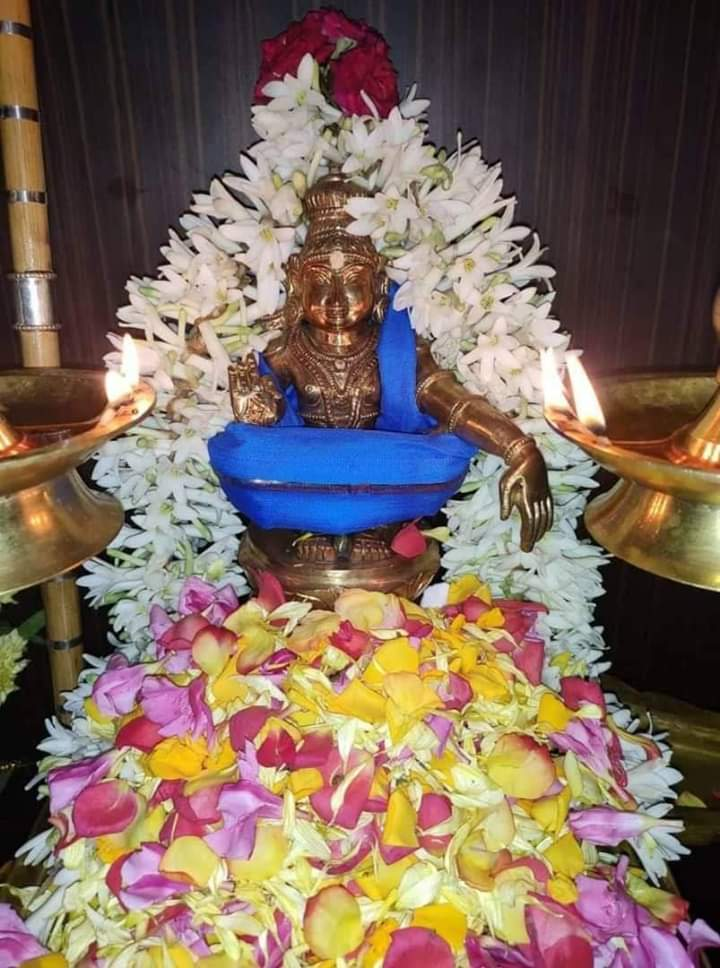
A 14th century Ayyanar sculpture (left) and depiction of Ayyappan at Sabarimala sanctum (right). Compare the meditation band Yogapattam around the knees of both deities.

A deity named "Ayyappan" is not recorded in any early Tamil/Sanskrit sources though the name Ayyappan appears as synonymous with (Vediya) Sastha in Tiruvalla copper plates of the 12th century CE and Kanyakumari Guhanathaswami Kovil Inscription. Neither Ayyappa nor Sabarimala is known as a pilgrim spot in the Tamil region before the 1940s. According to researchers Eliza Kent, Ruth Vanita and Saleem Kidwai, the legends in the Ayyappa tradition seem to be "artificially mixed and assembled into a kind of collage" and "he should have emerged from a Dravidian god of tribal provenance".

It has been claimed that the above mentioned Dravidian tribal god is none other than Ayyanar. Sabarimala Sthala Puranam, a recent purana, says that Ayyappan is the avatar of Ayyanar; the name Ayyappan has been described as a combination of Ayyan (Ayyanar) + Appan (father). Yogapatta bar around the knees of Ayyappan is the distinct character that can be seen in the Ayyanar statues of the Chola period. The horse mount of Aiyanar is still visible in the flag staff of Sabarimala Ayyappan temple. The synonym Sastha of Ayyappan is obviously the same as that of Ayyanar. Another important association is the presence of Karuppa samy in the worship of both deities.

Legend suggests that the idol of Sabarimala Ayyappan was consecrated by Parashurama. However, the Sanskrit inscription in the old bronze idol revealed that it was crafted in Kollam Era 1085 (1910 CE) by an artisan named Prabhakar Acharya. Tamil devotees did not discriminate Ayyappan with Ayyanar and they believe that Ayyappan is the avatar of Ayyanar. It can be noted that Sri Lankan Ayyanar temples are being converted into Ayyappan temples following the outbreak of Sabarimala pilgrimage of Sri Lankan devotees in recent years.

== Worship ==
Many temples are dedicated to Ayyanar can be seen all over South India as well as Sri Lanka. Almost all villages of Tamil Nadu would have an Aiyanar kovil. Ayyanar shrines are usually located at the peripheries or boundaries of rural villages and the deity is seen riding a horse with a sword or whip. Ayyanar has both types of temples - temples constructed in Agamic style and non-Agamic open air shrines. Ayyanar in Agamic temple is usually called Sastha or Dharma sastha. Kerala retains its Ayyanar temples as Sastha temples. The attendant priest for Aiyanar is generally from the potter caste who fashions idols and clay horses, although it is not uncommon for priests from other castes to officiate in the Ayyanar temples. Many castes of Tamil Nadu worship Ayyanar as their Kula deivam.

== Image gallery ==
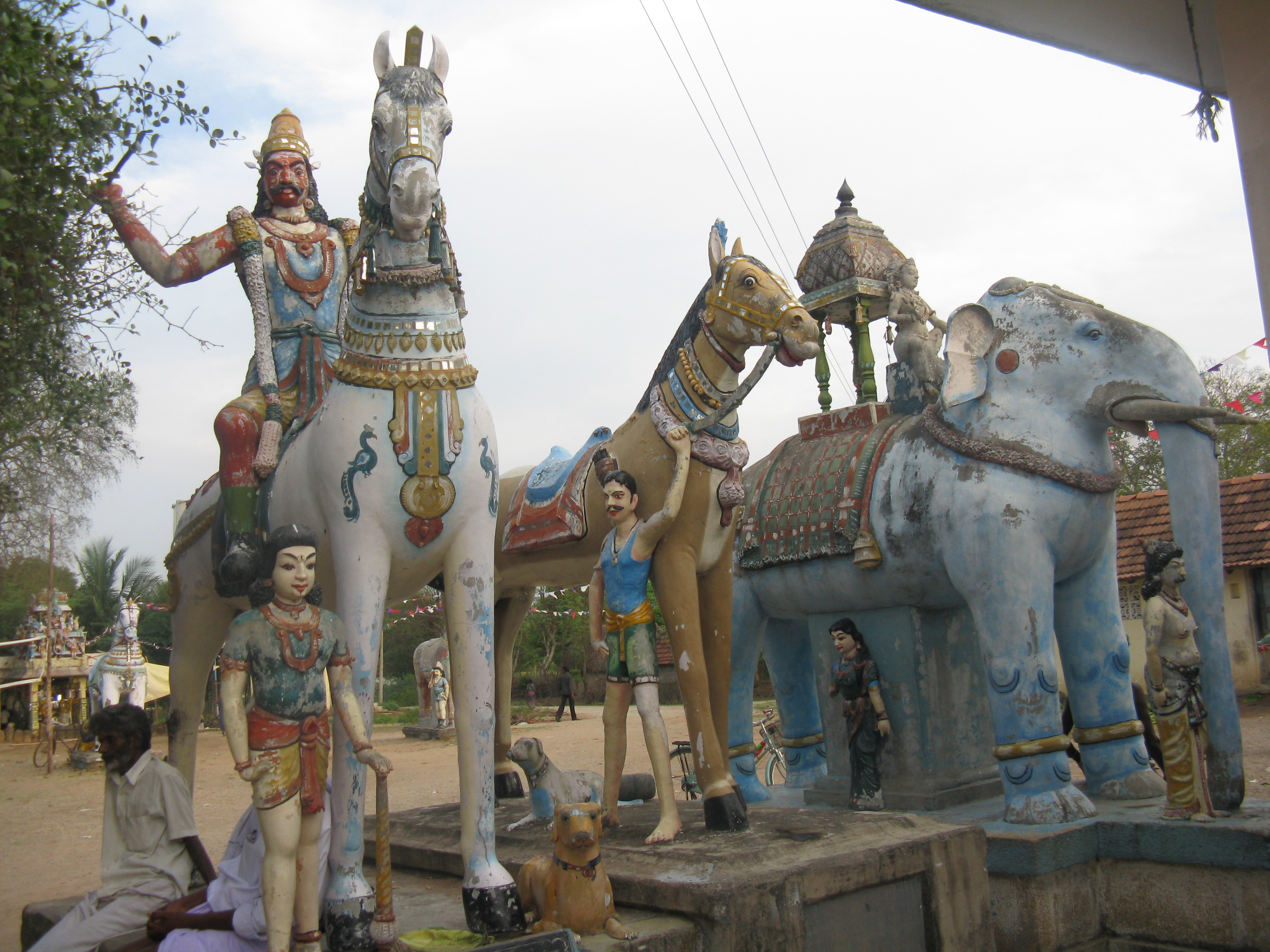
Front view of an Ayyanar Kovil, Perambalur, Tamil Nadu.

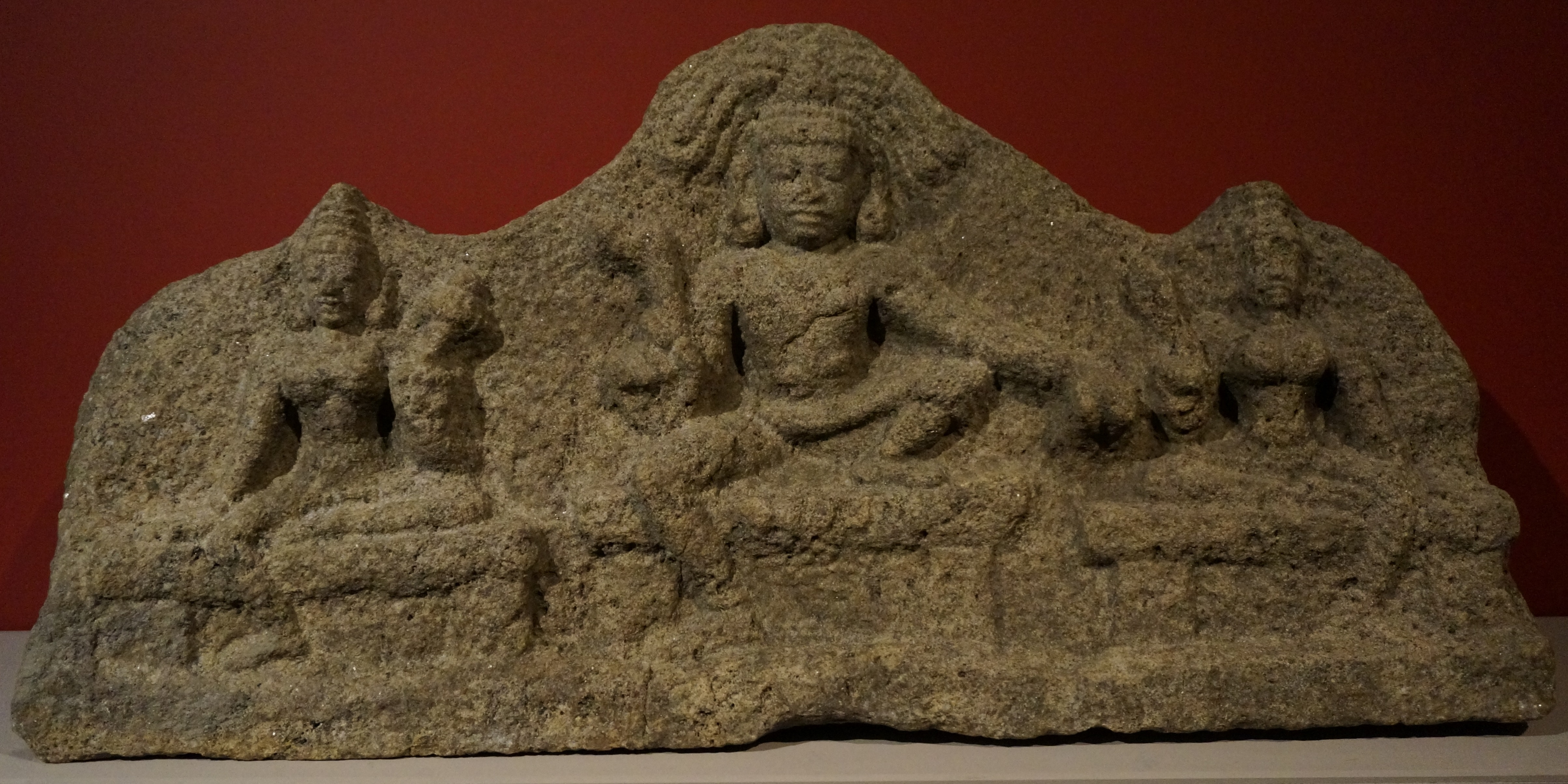
Ayyanar and his two consorts, 15–17th century CE, Châlons-en-Champagne French Museum

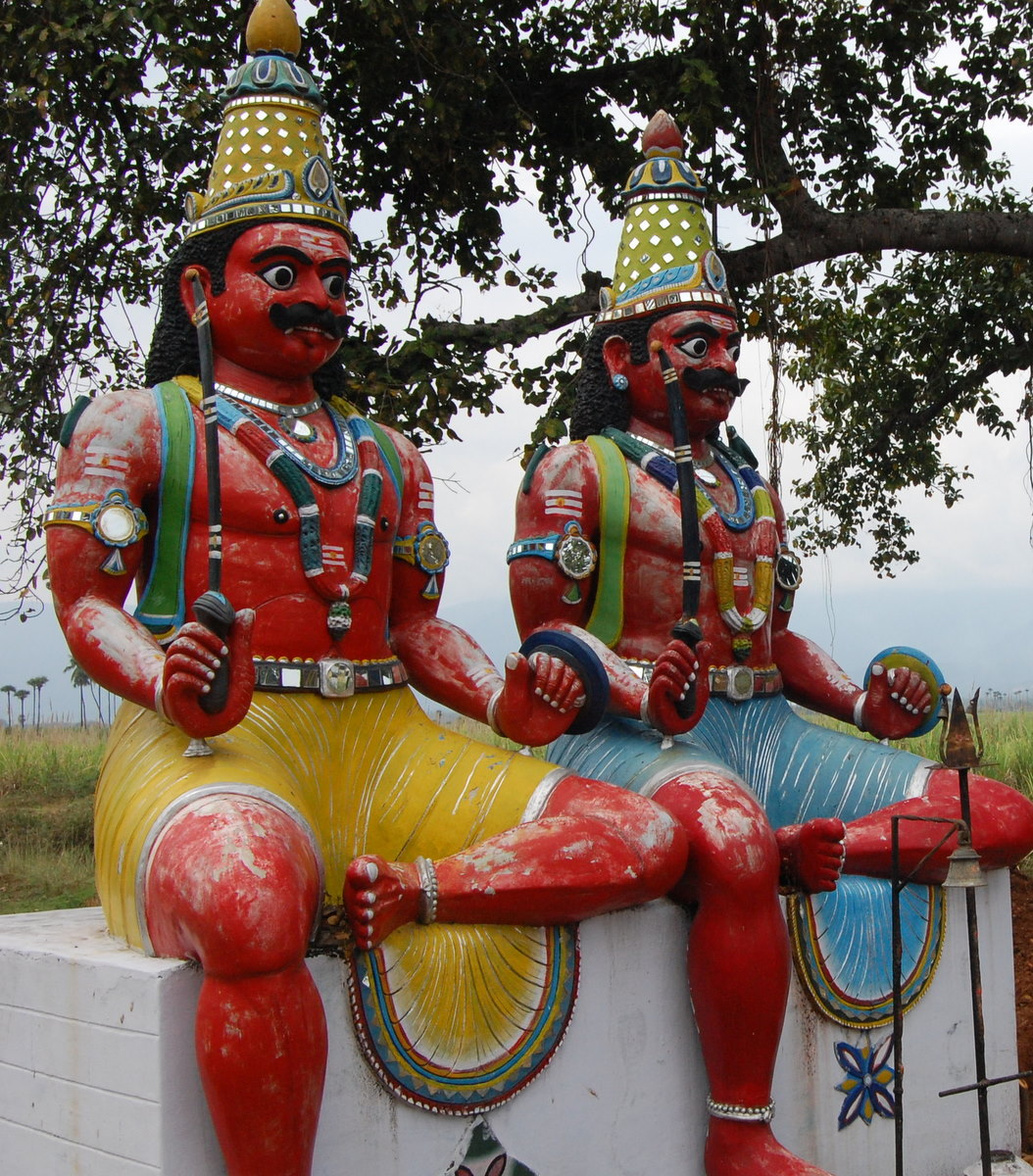
Ayyanar sculptures at Gopichettipalayam

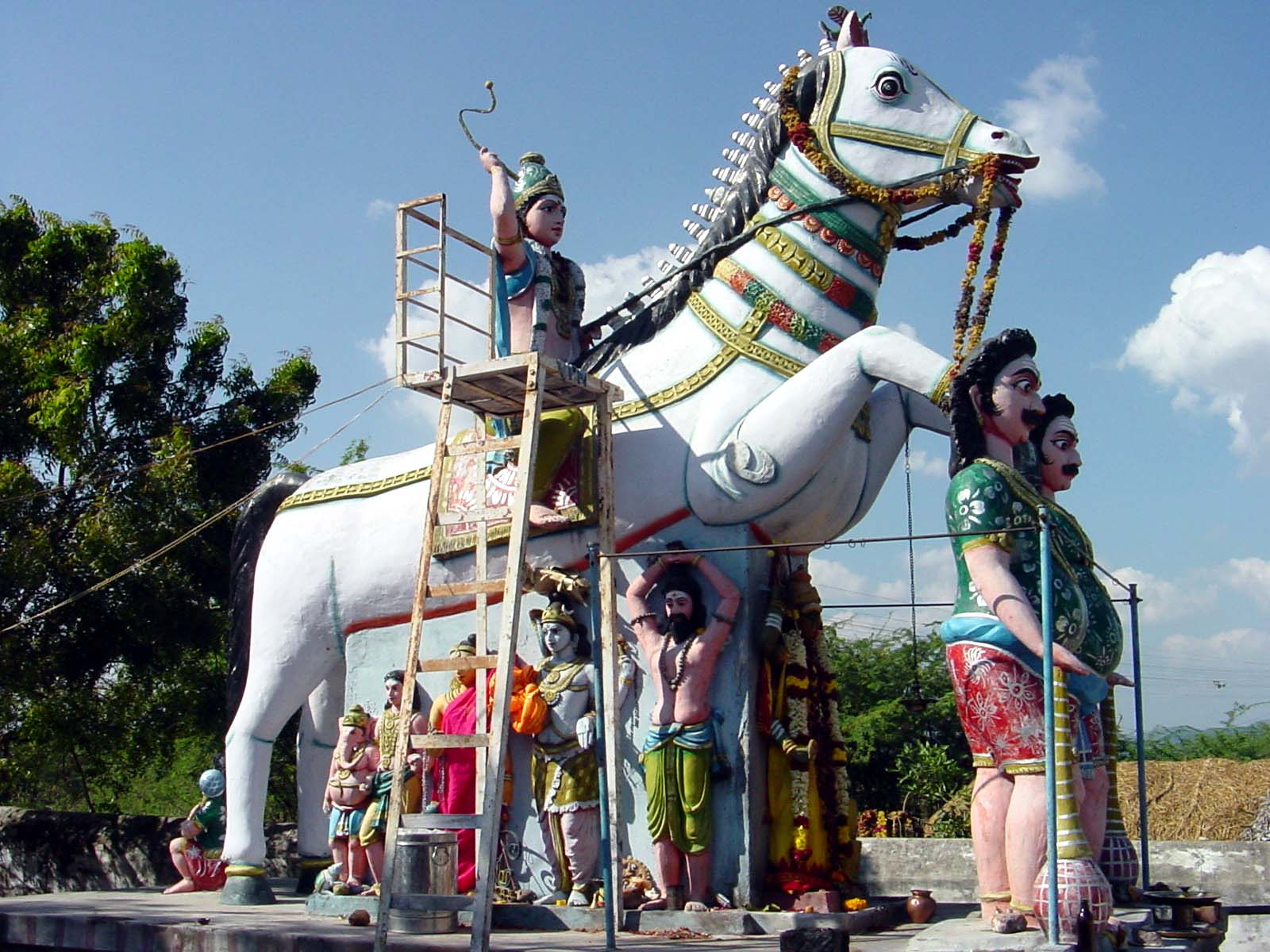
Ayyanar on horse, Madurai

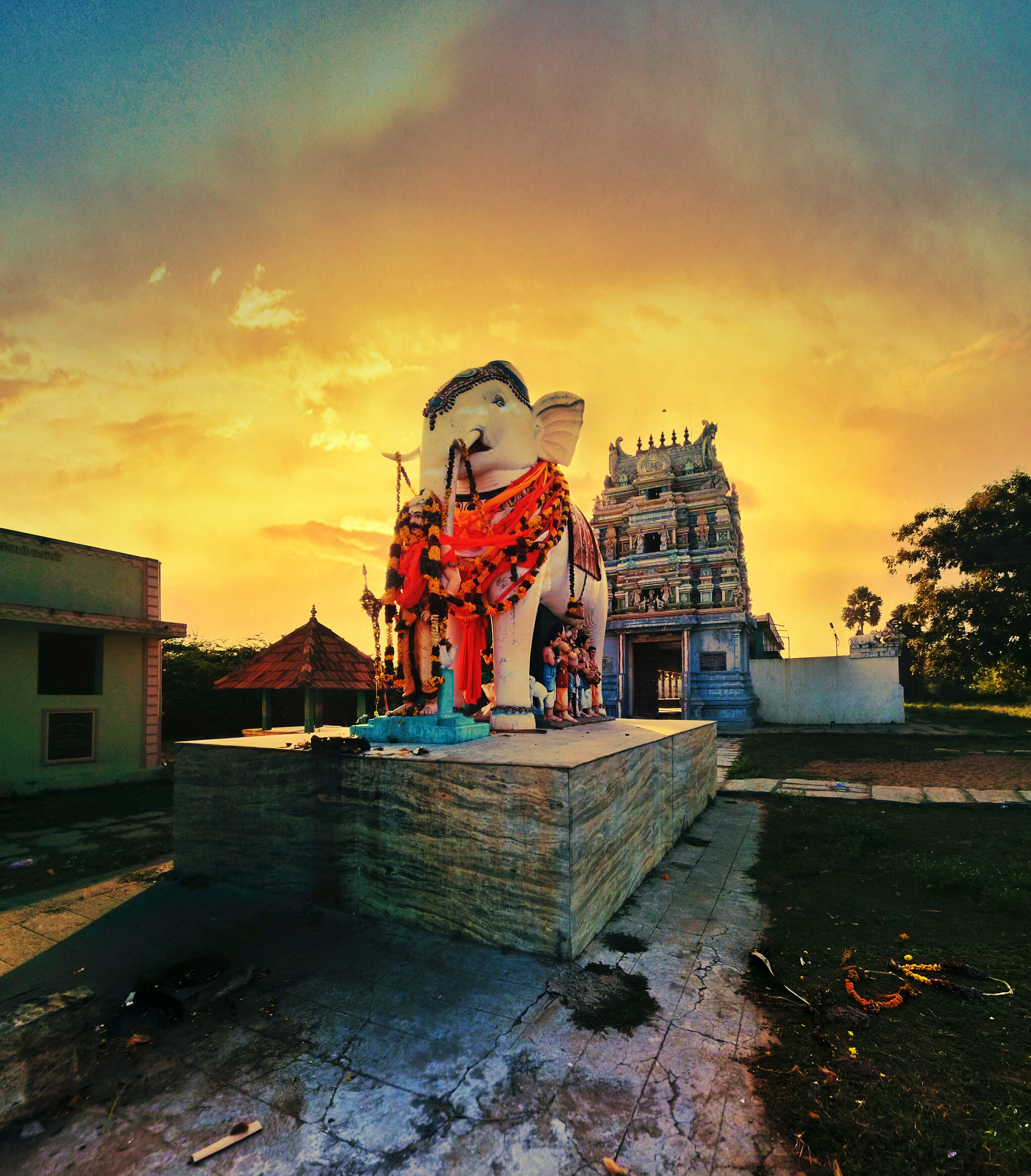
White elephant mount at Agamic Ayyanar temple, Mampatti

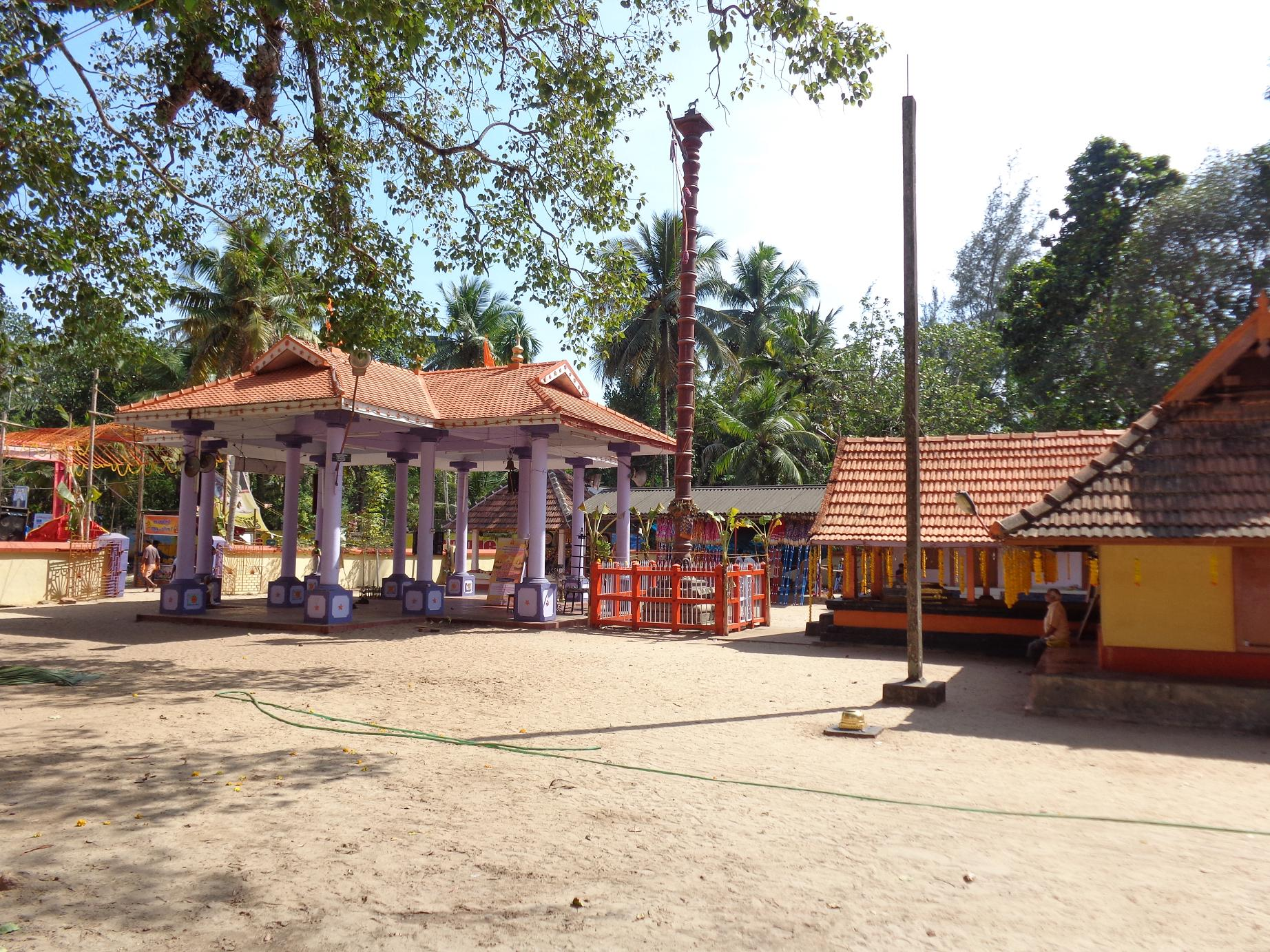
Kattuvalli Ayyan Kovil, Kerala

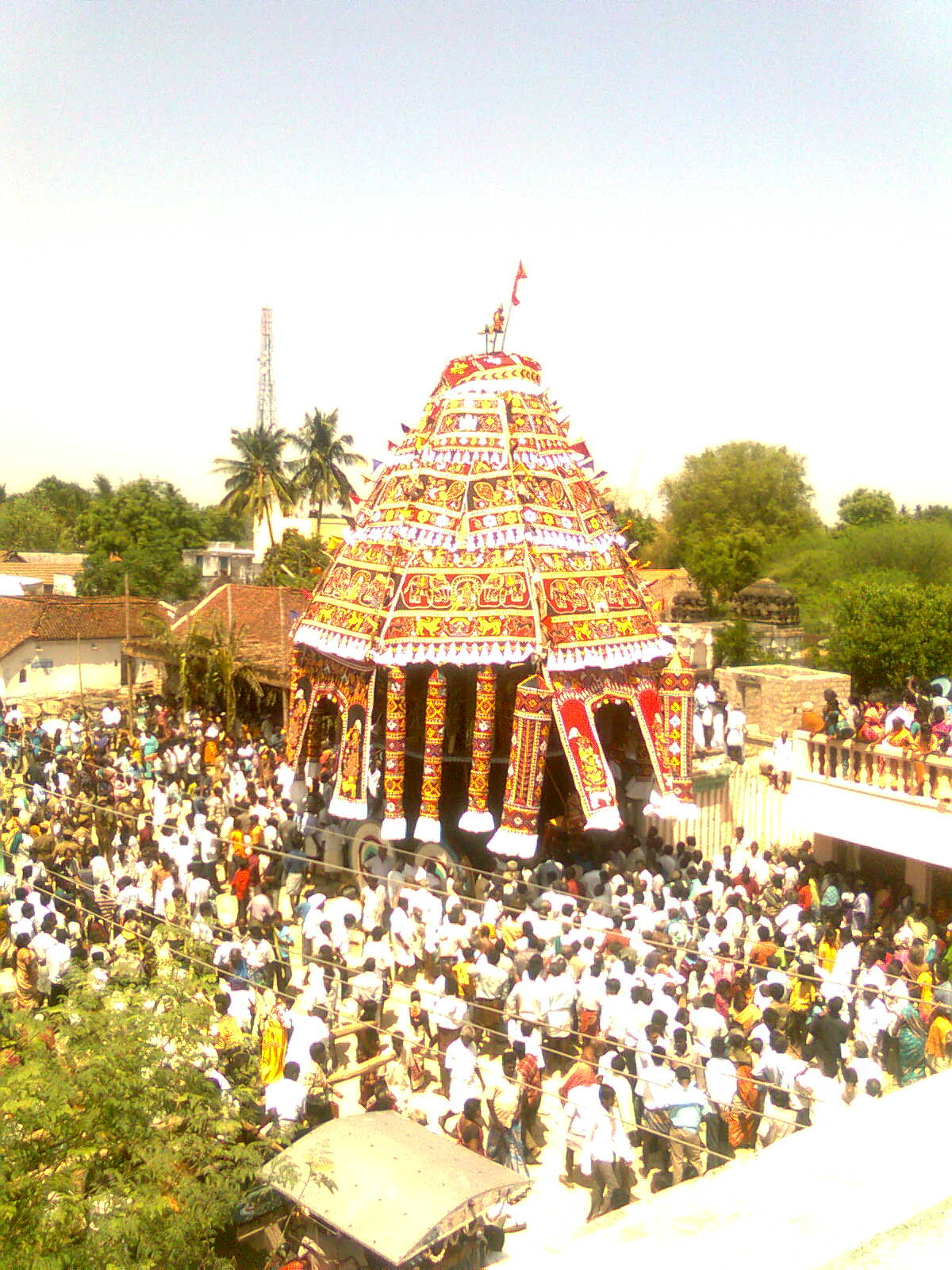
Ayyannar Car festival, Thungapuram

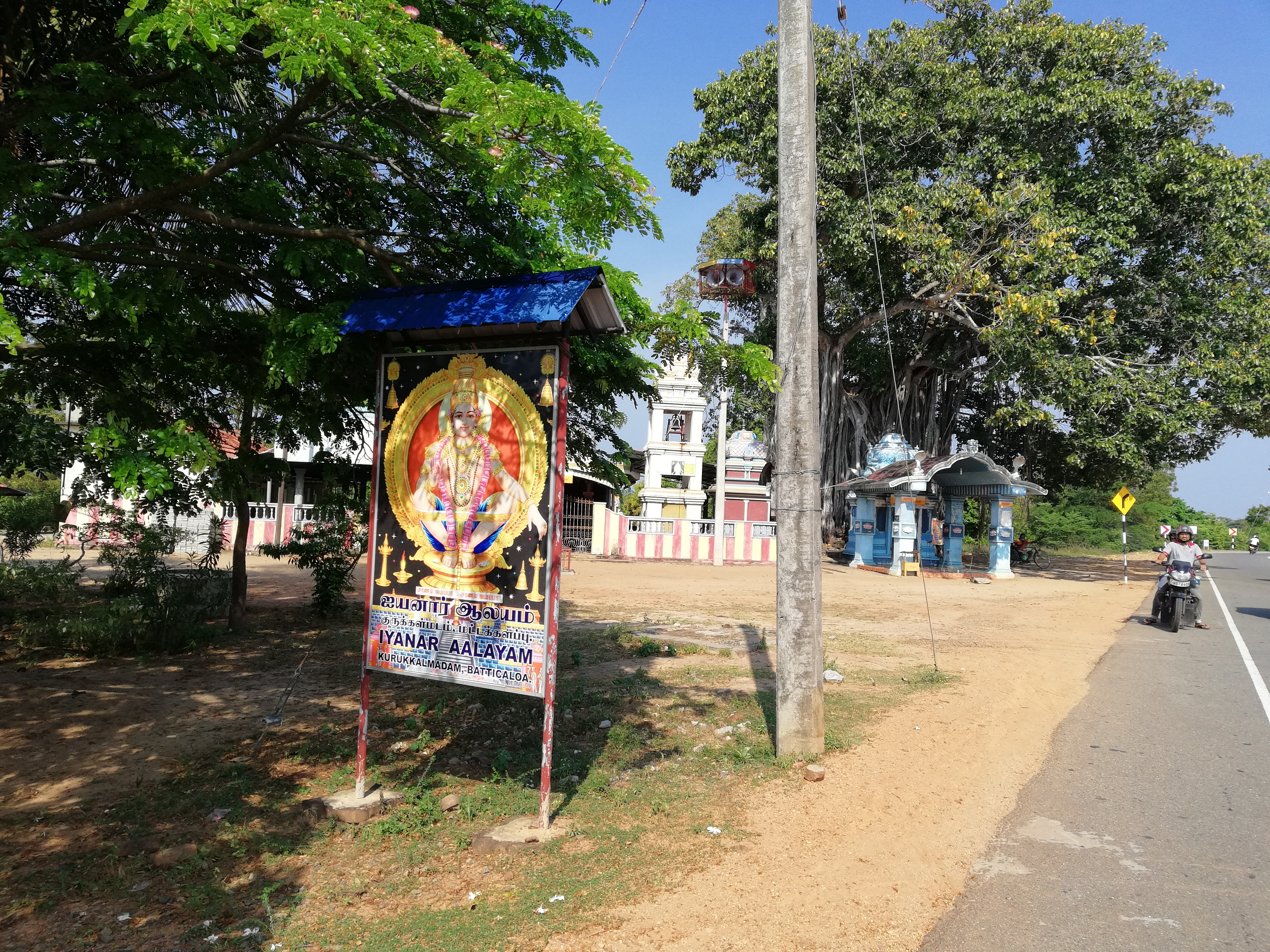
A name board of an Ayyanar Kovil at Kurukkalmadam, Batticaloa

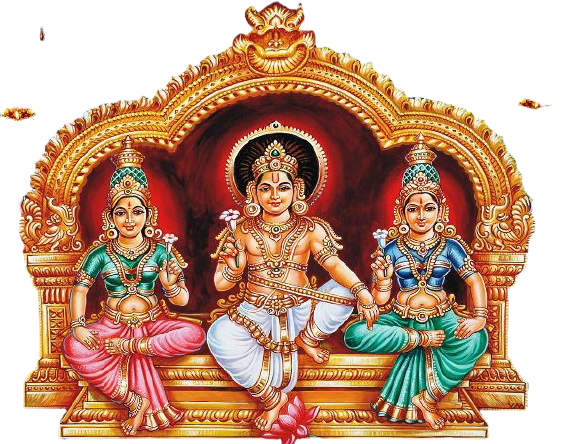
Ayyanar with his consort ( digital image)

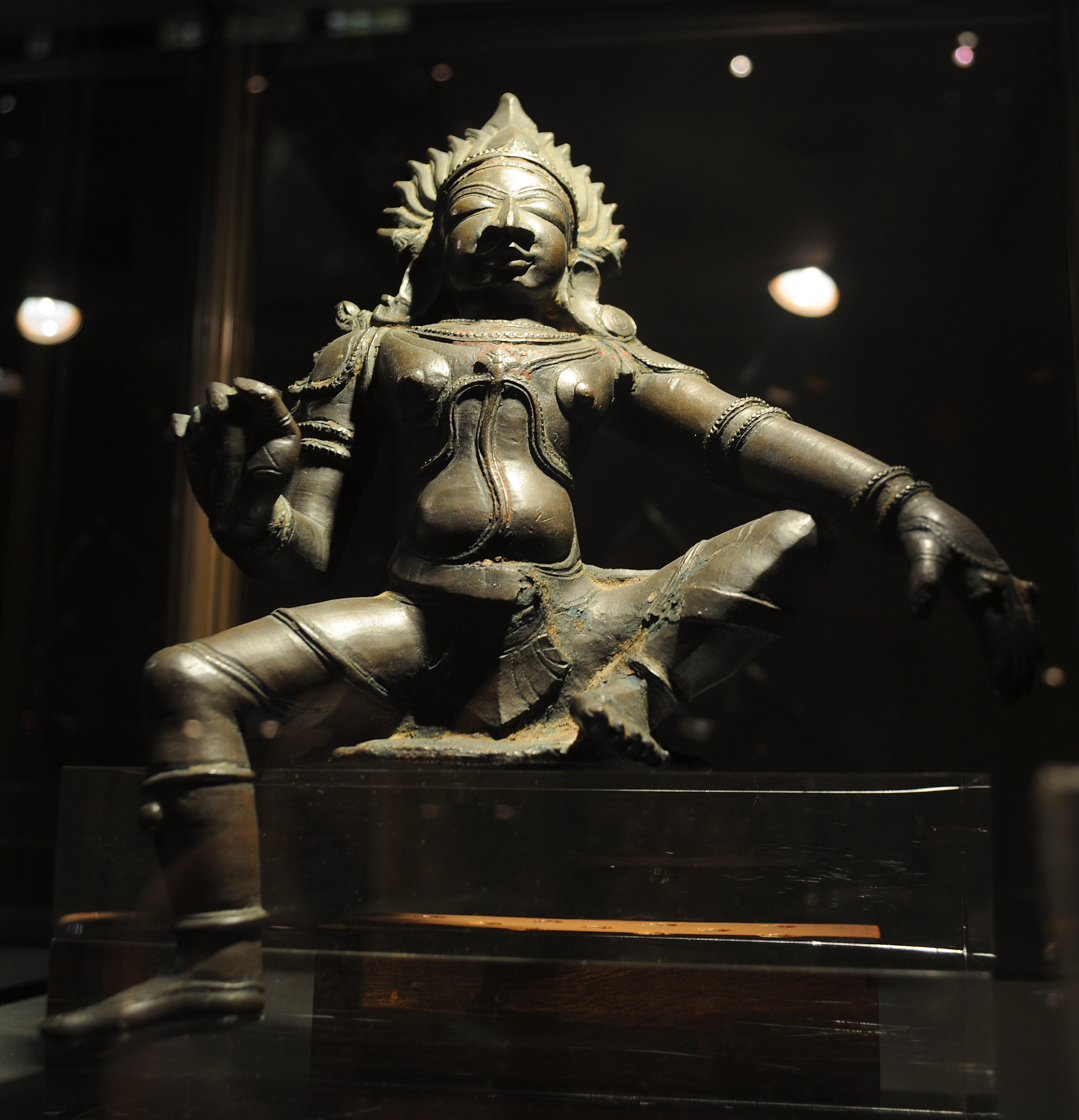
Ayyanar 17thcentury Bronze Statue

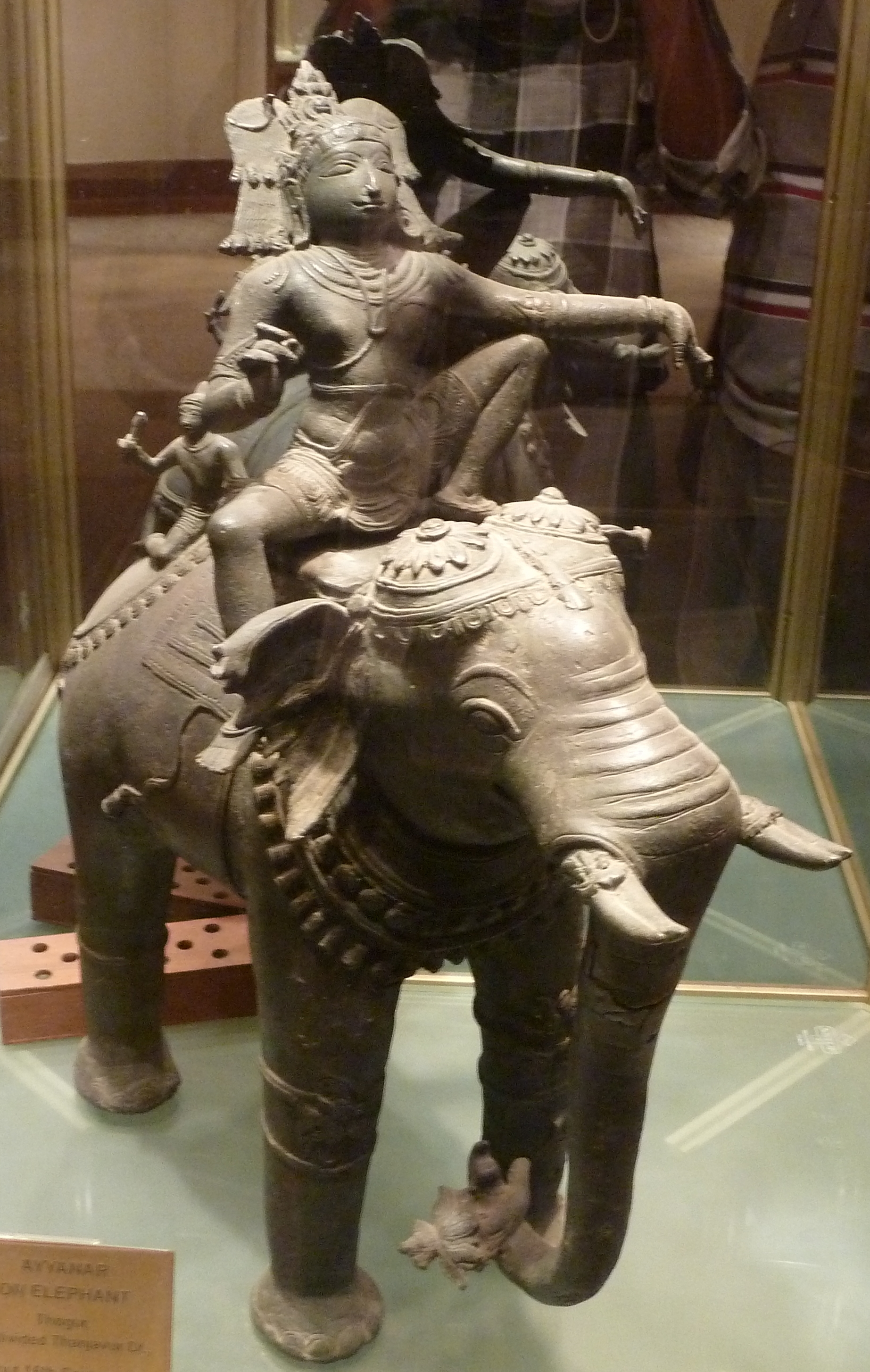
17 th century Ayyanar statue seated on elephant

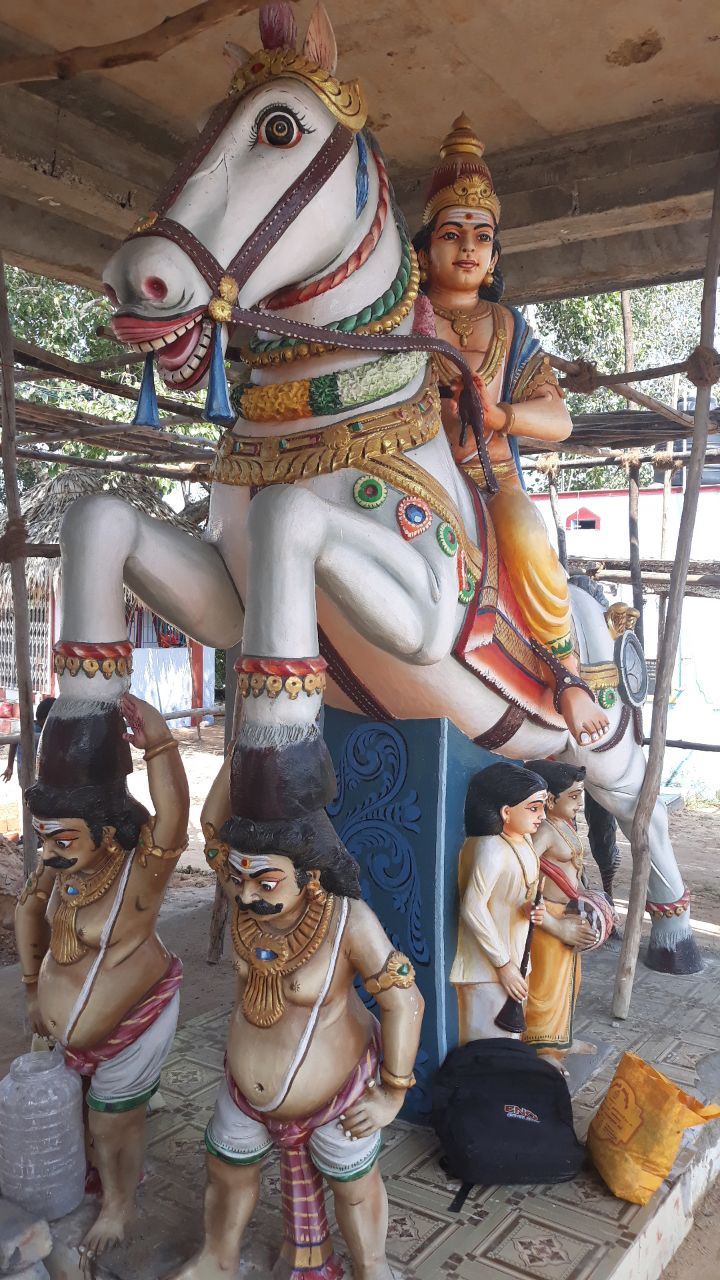
Ayyanar statue

== See also ==
- Ayyappan
- Karuppannaswamy
- Village deities of South India
- Shasta (deity)
- Ayyanayake
