= Mathura Kaliamman Temple, Siruvachur =

Temple in India

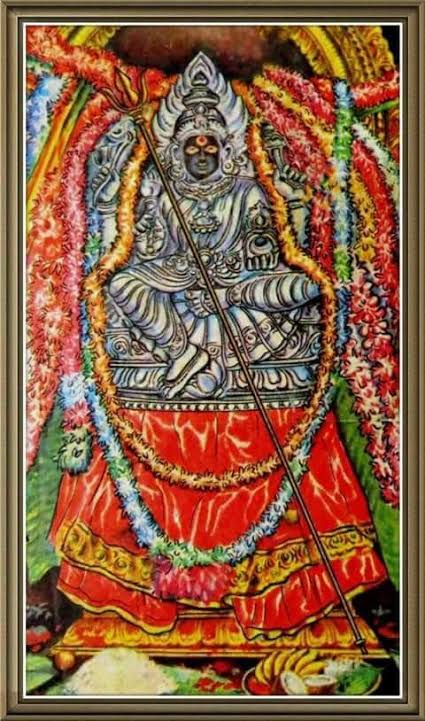
A painting of the idol of Mathura Kaliamman in the temple in Siruvachur

The Sri Madhura Kaliamman Temple is a Hindu temple dedicated to the goddess Kali located in the village of Siruvachur in the Perambalur taluk of Perambalur District, India. Siruvachur is located at a distance of 5 km from Perambalur, its nearest town. The Car festival and the annual Panguni festivals are important festivals celebrated.

== History ==
The place where the temple was constructed is believed to be the place where Kannagi, the idol of the Tamil epic Silappatikaram, reassured herself after burning Madurai city to the ground. According to tradition, Goddess Chelliamman was a local deity of Siruvachur. Her powers became delimited by a tantrik, who started using the powers and for destructive purposes. Kannagi came across this Devi temple at Siruvachur and decided to rest there for the night. During her stay, Chelliamman revealed her servitude, and Kannagi killed the tantrik and saved Chelliamman. Kannagi now received the name as Madura Kaliamman, as she is from Madurai & got rid of the tantric with the blessings of Goddess Kali. Chelliamman, as a gesture of gratitude and also in order to greet Madura Kaliamman, moved to the Periaswamimali, a nearby hillock, requesting the latter to stay in Siruvachur to which Madura Kaliamman accepted with a suggestion that the initial offerings shall be presented to her (Chelliamman). The temple is about 1000 years old. Sri Mathura Kaliamman is the kula devata (family deity) of the saint Sri Jagadguru Mahaperiyava Chandrasekharendra Saraswati Mahaswami of the Sri Kanchipuram Kamakoti Peetham.

== Deities ==
The prime deity is Mathura Kaliamman. The temple is open to devotees only twice a week – Monday and Friday. It is believed that the main deity, Mathura Kaliamman, stays with Chelliamman during the remaining days of the week.

== Festivals ==
A Car festival is held annually during the month of May. During the festival, the idol of goddess Mathura Kaliamman is brought from the shrine to the car where rituals are performed. The car-festival is a part of the annual festival that is celebrated for a period of 13 days.

A yearly Mahabishekam to the Deity has been performed since 1974 by Sri Mathurakaliamman Mahabhisheha Association(a registered autonomous body). This Mahabishekam is performed during the last Friday of Tamil month "Thai".

== Places to Stay ==
- Hotel Temple In - Boarding & Lodging. Opposite to Dhanalakshmi Srinivasan Medical College (about 3 km from the temple, on the Chennai - Trichy NH 45). Cell - 73732 11299; 73732 11277
- Hotel Aryas

== Places to Eat ==
- Hotel Ashwin - High class vegetarian food; Opposite to Dhanalakshmi Srinivasan Medical College (about 5 km from the temple, on the Chennai - Trichy NH 45)
- Hotel Aryas - High class vegetarian food (within 4 km) from the temple, on NH 45
