= Govindapuram, Ariyalur =

Govindapuram
- village
- Country: India
- State: Tamil Nadu
- District: Ariyalur

Population (2001)
  - Total: 3,718

Languages
  - Official: Tamil
- Time zone: UTC+5:30 (IST)
- Vehicle registration: TN-
- Coastline: 0 kilometres (0 mi)
- Sex ratio: 1188 ♂/♀
- Literacy: 59.97%

Govindapuram is a village in the Ariyalur taluk of Ariyalur district, Tamil Nadu, India.

== Demographics ==
As of 2001 census, Govindapuram had a total population of 3,718 with 1,699 males and 2,019 females.
