= Nedumpura =

- village
- Location in Kerala, India Nedumpura (India)
- Coordinates: 10°23′25″N 76°9′5″E
- Country: India
- State: Kerala
- District: Thrissur

Government
  - Type: Panchayat

Population (2011)
  - Total: 12,399

Languages
  - Official: Malayalam
- Time zone: UTC+5:30 (IST)
- PIN: 679531

Nedumpura is a village in Thrissur district in the state of Kerala, India.

== Demographics ==
As of 2011 India census, Nedumpura had a population of 12399 with 5929 males and 6470 females.
