= Illuppaiyur =

- village
- Country: India
- State: Tamil Nadu
- District: Ariyalur

Population (2001)
  - Total: 3,231

Languages
  - Official: Tamil
- Time zone: UTC+5:30 (IST)
- Vehicle registration: TN-
- Sex ratio: 1138 ♂/♀
- Literacy: 53.42%

Illuppaiyur is a village in Ariyalur district, Tamil Nadu, India. The village is near the river Kundaru. Illupai trees are found in abundance in this area; the village gets its name from this.

Mostly two communities reside here, Nadar and Chettiar. Illuppaiyur has more than five temples.

== Demographics ==
As per the 2001 census, Illuppaiyur had a total population of 3,231 people with 1511 males and 1720 females.
