= Arungal =

- village
- Location in Tamil Nadu, India Arungal (India)
- Coordinates: 11°1′6″N 79°6′44″E
- Country: India
- State: Tamil Nadu
- District: Ariyalur

Population (2001)
  - Total: 2,868

Languages
  - Official: Tamil
- Time zone: UTC+5:30 (IST)
- Vehicle registration: TN-
- Coastline: 0 kilometres (0 mi)
- Sex ratio: 999 ♂/♀
- Literacy: 46.24%

Arungal is a village in the Ariyalur taluk of Ariyalur district, Tamil Nadu, India.

== Demographics ==
As of 2001 census, Arungal had a total population of 2868 with 1435 males and 1433 females.
