= Shasta (deity) =

Hindu god

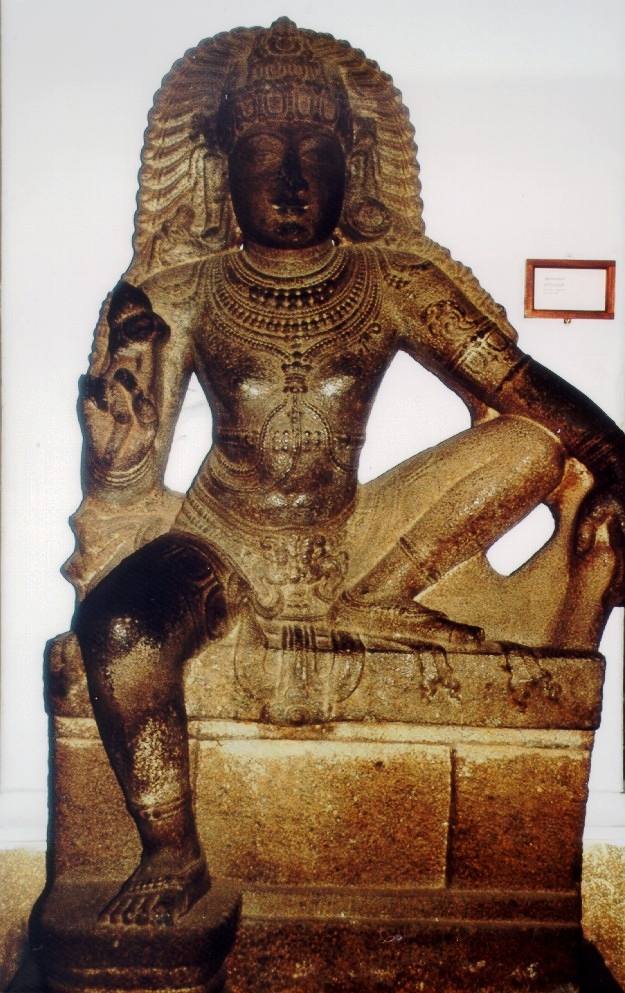
Statue of Shasta, Chola Dynasty, Government Museum, Chennai, Tamil Nadu, India

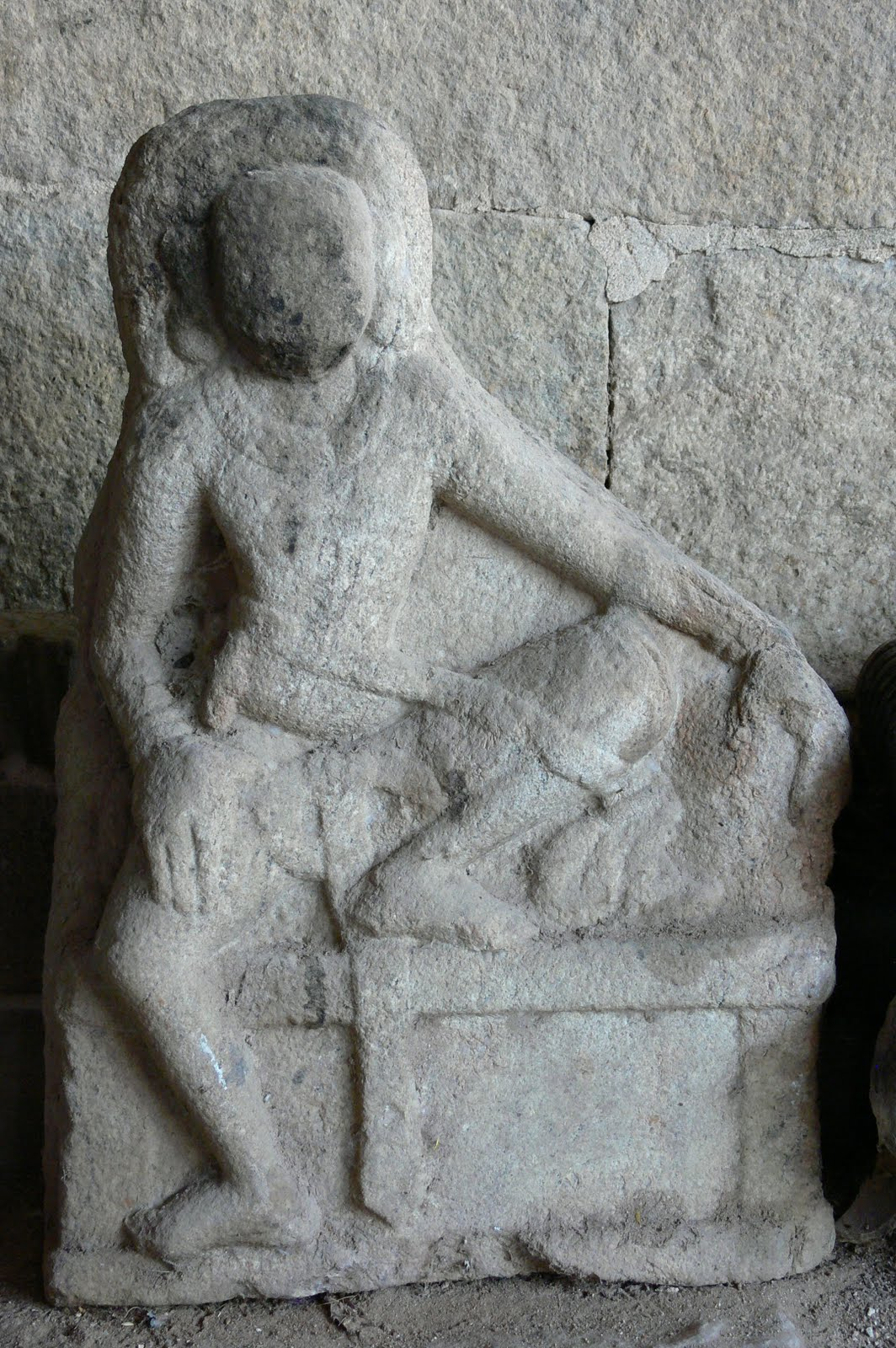
Shasta from Kudumiyanmalai, Tamil Nadu

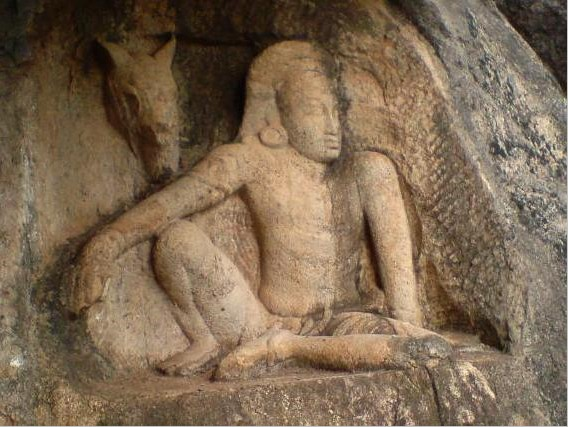
Pre-Buddhist Ayyanayake with horse from Isurumuniya, Sri Lanka

Shasta (IAST Śāstā) is a Hindu deity, described as the son of the deities Shiva and Mohini, Vishnu's female avatar. In South India, he is identified with the Ayyanar, Nattarayan or Sattan in Tamil Nadu, as Ayyanayake in Sinhala and the Ayyappan in Kerala. His principal function is to act as a kuladevata of a given clan, as well as act as a guardian of a village's boundaries.

== Origins ==
According to Hindu mythology, Shasta is the son of Shiva and Vishnu, the latter in his female avatar as Mohini. Because of his divine parentage, he holds a high status in the Hindu pantheon, though his roles often overlap with localized and folk traditions.

Shasta is a generic term that means "Teacher, Guide, Lord, Ruler" in Sanskrit. In South India, a number of deities are associated with Shasta. The Tamil song Shasta Varavu states that there are eight important incarnations and forms of Shasta. This is also present in the agamic work Dyana Ratnavali. The Ashta-Shasta (eight Shastas) are Aadhi Maha Shasta, Dharma Shasta (Ayyappan), Gnana Shasta, Kalyana Varadha Shasta, Sammohana Shasta, Santhana Prapti Shasta, Veda Shasta and Veera Shasta. Brahma Shasta is another term associated with Kartikeya.

== Functions and Roles ==
Shasta serves several distinct religious and social functions. His principal function is often the protection of territory and boundaries. For example, in some Tamil villages, his temple is situated outside the main habitation area to guard the village limits.

He serves as a clan deity (kuladevata), offering protection to specific kin groups. Despite his status as a great god, his tole is often viewed as near-equivalent to Ayyanar, a prominent village deity in northern Tamil Nadu. In the hierarchy of village deities, Shasta is considered superior to and rules over subordinate guardian deities, such as Madan or Karuppan, who often stand guard at his temple sites.

== Worship ==
In the Kerala style of Hindu temple architecture, Shasta is associated with a specific and unique form of the srikovil (inner sanctum). Some srikovils dedicated to Shasta (and the goddess Kali) feature a central altar and image that are entirely exposed to the sky, lacking a traditional roof. Unlike many other Hindu temples, these open-air srikovils are typically not fronted by mandapas (pillared halls). This architectural style is thought to relate to ancient conceptualization where he deity and nature are viewed as inseparable.

== Regional Significance ==
While Shasta is a celestial deity with general powers, his worship is often highly localized.

=== Tamil Nadu ===
In Tamil Nadu, Ayyanar is used as the regional name of the deity Shasta. The earliest reference to Aiynar-Shasta is from the Arcot district in Tamil Nadu. The stones are dated to the 3rd century CE. They read "Ayanappa; a shrine to Cattan." This is followed by another inscription in Uraiyur near Tiruchirapalli which is dated to the 4th century CE.

Literary references to Aiyanar-Cattan are found in Silappatikaram, a Tamil work dated to the 4th to 5th centuries CE. The Tamil Sangam classics Purananuru, Akananuru etc. refer to Ayyanar and "Cattan" in many poems. There are several numerous references to Shasta in Sangam works. Some Tamil inscriptions of the Sangam period and a few of the later Pallava and Chola period coming in from various parts of the kingdoms refer to him as Sevugan and Mahasasta.

There are references in the Puranas that narrate as to how Shasta during his tenure on earth long ago conducted discourses on Vedas and Vedantas to a galaxy of gods and sages.

The hymns of some Alvars like Tirumangai Alvar and Nammalvar in temples like Tirumogur near Madurai refer to Shasta. A Sanskrit work dated prior to the 7th century known as the Brahmanda Purana mentions Shasta as Harihara suta, or the son of Shiva and Narayana (Vishnu), the oppressor of the asuras.

Later on, the Saivite revivalist Appar sang about Shasta as the progeny of Shiva and Tirumal (Vishnu) in one of his Tevarams in the 7th century. The saint Sambandar, in one of his songs, praises Ayyanar as a celibate god, invincible and terrible in warfare, taking his abode alongside the bhootaganas of Shiva. The place sanctity and history document, or sthala purana of Tiruvanaikkaval, a Shaivite temple near Tiruchi, which was first documented by the sage Kashyapa, informs us that Shasta once served Shiva at that site and after being blessed with a vision was instructed by God to take his abode in the outer sanctorum. It says that Shasta continues to worship him during the day of tiruvadirai. Adi Sankara also has referred to Ayyanar in sivanandalahari in one verse. Some ancient hagiographies have accounted that Sankara was a deivamsam (divine soul portion) of Shasta (sevugan), the same way that Sambandar was a divine portion of Skanda and Sundarar a divine portion of Alagasundarar. He is also known to have composed verses praising the deity but the same are not available to us as of today. From the Chola period (9th century CE) onwards the popularity of Aiyanar-Shasta became even more pronounced as is attested by epigraphy and imagery.

=== Kerala ===
The Shasta religious tradition is particularly well developed in the state of Kerala. The earliest inscription to Shasta was made in 855 CE by an Ay King at the Padmanabhapuram Sivan temple. Independent temples to Shasta are known from the 11th century CE. Prior to that, Shasta veneration took place in the temples of Shiva and Vishnu, the premier gods of the Hindu pantheon. Since late medieval times, the warrior deity Ayyappa's following has become very popular in the 20th century.

== See also ==
- Nurani, a village in Palakkad, Kerala, noted for its Sastha devotion.
