= Srinivasapuram =

- Slum
- Location within India
- Coordinates: 13°01′09″N 80°16′38″E
- Country: India
- State: Tamil Nadu
- District: Chennai

Area
  - Total: 7.48 km^{2} (2.89 sq mi)
- Time zone: UTC+5:30 (IST)

Srinivasapuram (சீனிவாசபுரம்) is an area located in Chennai, Tamil Nadu, India. It is centered between Santhome and Adyar, along the shore of the sea.

== Education ==
- Sri Venkateswara Matriculation Higher Secondary School

== Religion ==
Every year after Vinayagar Chathurthi celebrations, used Vinayagar idols are immersed in Sea and on 20 September 2026, Vinayagar idol immersion was held in the seashore in Srinivasapuram area, where it is one of the areas of idol immersion.
