= Thonguttipalayam =

Thonguttipalayam is a village in Tiruppur district, Tamil Nadu, India. As of the 2011 Census of India, it had a population of 5,200, with 2,649 males and 2,551 females.
