= Periyathirukonam =

Periyathirukonam chettithirukkonam
- village
- Country: India
- State: Tamil Nadu
- District: Ariyalur

Government
  - Body: Ariyalur

Population (2001)
  - Total: 2,487

Languages
  - Official: Tamil
- Time zone: UTC+5:30 (IST)
- Vehicle registration: TN-
- Coastline: 0 kilometres (0 mi)
- Sex ratio: 1029 ♂/♀
- Literacy: 58.71%
- Lok Sabha constituency: Chidambaram
- Civic agency: Ariyalur

Periyathirukonam is a village on the banks of the maruthai aaru in the Ariyalur taluk of Ariyalur district, Tamil Nadu, India. The village is known for its temples dedicated to deities such as Iyanar, Adaikka Karuppu, Nondi Karuppu, Malayala Karuppu. A temple built in 765 AD is located on the southwestern corner of the village. It is located 20 km from the district headquarters of Ariyalur.

== Demographics ==
According to the 2001 census, Periyathirukonam had a total population of 2,487, comprising 1,226 males and 1,261 females.
