= Kavanur =

- village
- Location in Tamil Nadu, India Kavanur (India)
- Coordinates: 13°00′N 80°04′E
- Country: India
- State: Tamil Nadu
- District: Ariyalur

Population (2001)
  - Total: 2,926

Languages
  - Official: Tamil
- Time zone: UTC+5:30 (IST)
- Vehicle registration: TN-
- Coastline: 0 kilometres (0 mi)
- Sex ratio: 1010 ♂/♀
- Literacy: 46.04%

Kavanur is a village in the Ariyalur taluk of Ariyalur district, Tamil Nadu, India.
