= Kadugur =

- village
- Interactive map of Kadugur
- Coordinates: 11°03′N 76°07′E
- Country: India
- State: Tamil Nadu
- District: Ariyalur

Population (2001)
  - Total: 3,924

Languages
  - Official: Tamil
- Time zone: UTC+5:30 (IST)
- Vehicle registration: TN-
- Coastline: 0 kilometres (0 mi)
- Sex ratio: 948 ♂/♀
- Literacy: 58.05%

Kadugur is a village in the Ariyalur taluk of Ariyalur district, Tamil Nadu, India.

== Demographics ==
As per the 2001 census, Kadugur had a total population of 3,924 with 2,014 males and 1,910 females.

Revenue villages

1. Kadugur
2. Ayan Athur
3. K.Poyyur
4. Poomudaiyanpatti
5. Thalaiyarikudikadu
6. Kopalan kudikadu (en) Koppilian kudikadu
7. Nuraiyur

President of the village

- Dharmalingam - 2019

Nearest places

1. Govt Hospital - Kadugur
2. Govt Higher Secondary School - Ayan Aathur
3. Govt Primary School - Ayan Aathur, K. Poyyur, Thalaiyarikudikadu, Kopilian Kudikadu
4. Private schools - Kadugur (Thirumurugan Aided Primary School)
5. Playground - APJ Abdul Kalam Cricket Ground
