= Rayampuram =

- village
- Country: India
- State: Tamil Nadu
- District: Ariyalur

Population (2001)
  - Total: 3,267

Languages
  - Official: Tamil
- Time zone: UTC+5:30 (IST)
- PIN: 621718
- Vehicle registration: TN- 61
- Coastline: 0 kilometres (0 mi)
- Nearest city: Ariyalur
- Sex ratio: 1018 ♂/♀
- Literacy: 58.98%
- Lok Sabha constituency: Chidambaram

Rayampuram is a village in the Ariyalur taluk of Ariyalur district, Tamil Nadu, India.

== Demographics ==
As of 2001 census, Raympuram had a total population of 3,267 with 1,619 males and 1,648 females.
