= Kallankurichi =

- village
- Location in Tamil Nadu, India Kallankurichi (India)
- Coordinates: 11°9′1.3″N 79°7′11.75″E
- Country: India
- State: Tamil Nadu
- District: Ariyalur

Population (2001)
  - Total: 4,884

Languages
  - Official: Tamil
- Time zone: UTC+5:30 (IST)
- PIN: 621705
- Vehicle registration: TN-61
- Coastline: 0 kilometres (0 mi)
- Nearest city: Ariyalur
- Sex ratio: 992 ♂/♀
- Literacy: 66.73%

Kallankurichi is a village in the Ariyalur taluk of Ariyalur district, Tamil Nadu, India.

== Demographics ==
Sri Kaliyaperumal temple is a major attraction of Kallankurichi. It is situated 5 km away from Ariyalur. This temple is famous for its "Car festival" (March/April) which is conducted yearly. The people of Kallankurichi and Ariyalur District celebrate the festival grandly. The temple is also famous for Puraittasi Saturdays. Every year in the month of 'Puraittasi' (September), special Pujas, 'Arathanai', 'Abishekams', etc. are done on four Saturdays. This also is a major attraction of the Kaliyaperumal temple.

G. Govindasamy Padayachi is the Hereditary Trustee of the Temple.'

As of 2001 census, Kallankurichi had a total population of 4884 with 2452 males and 2432 females.
