= Christianity in Thailand =

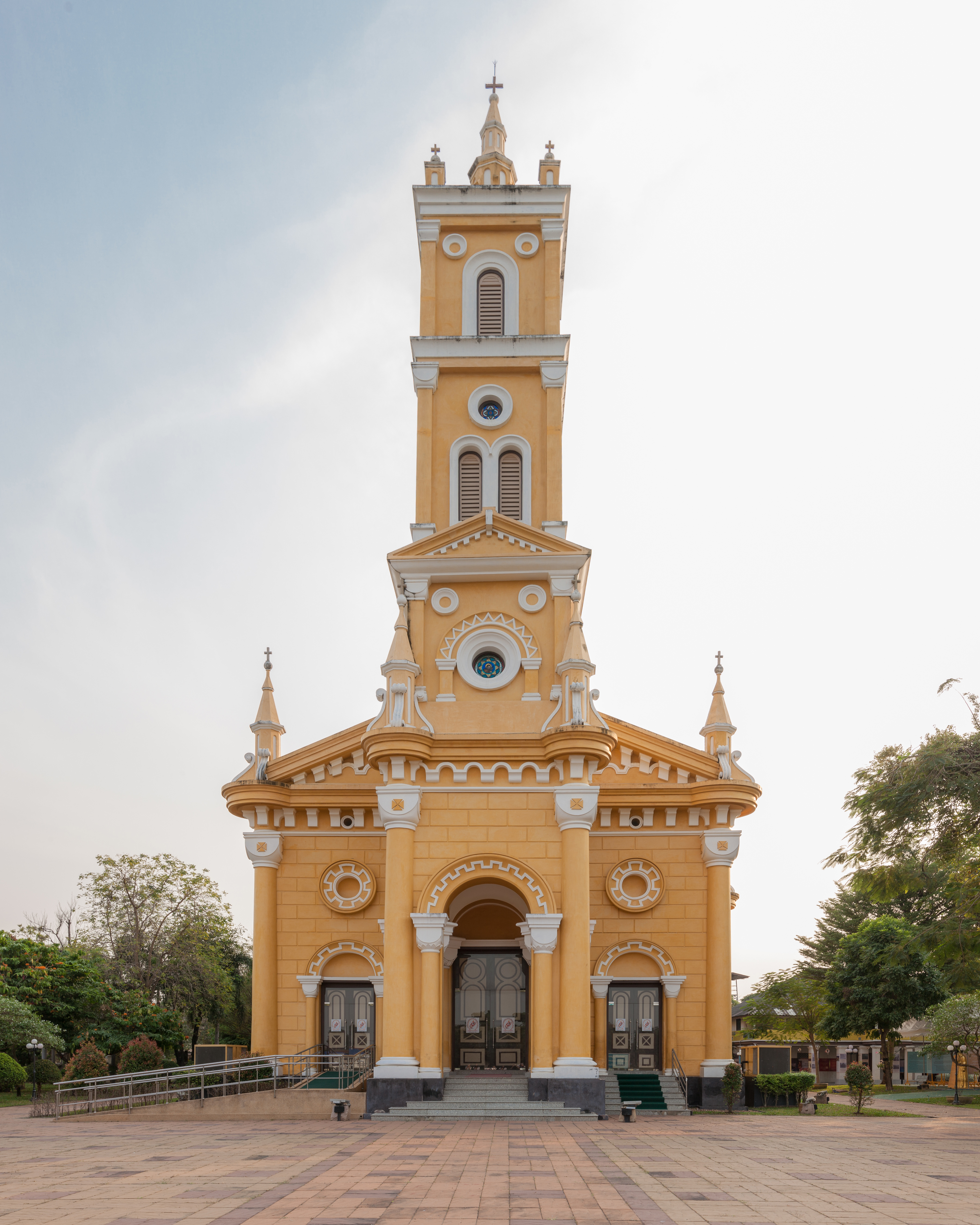
St Joseph's Church, Ayutthaya of the Catholic Church in Thailand

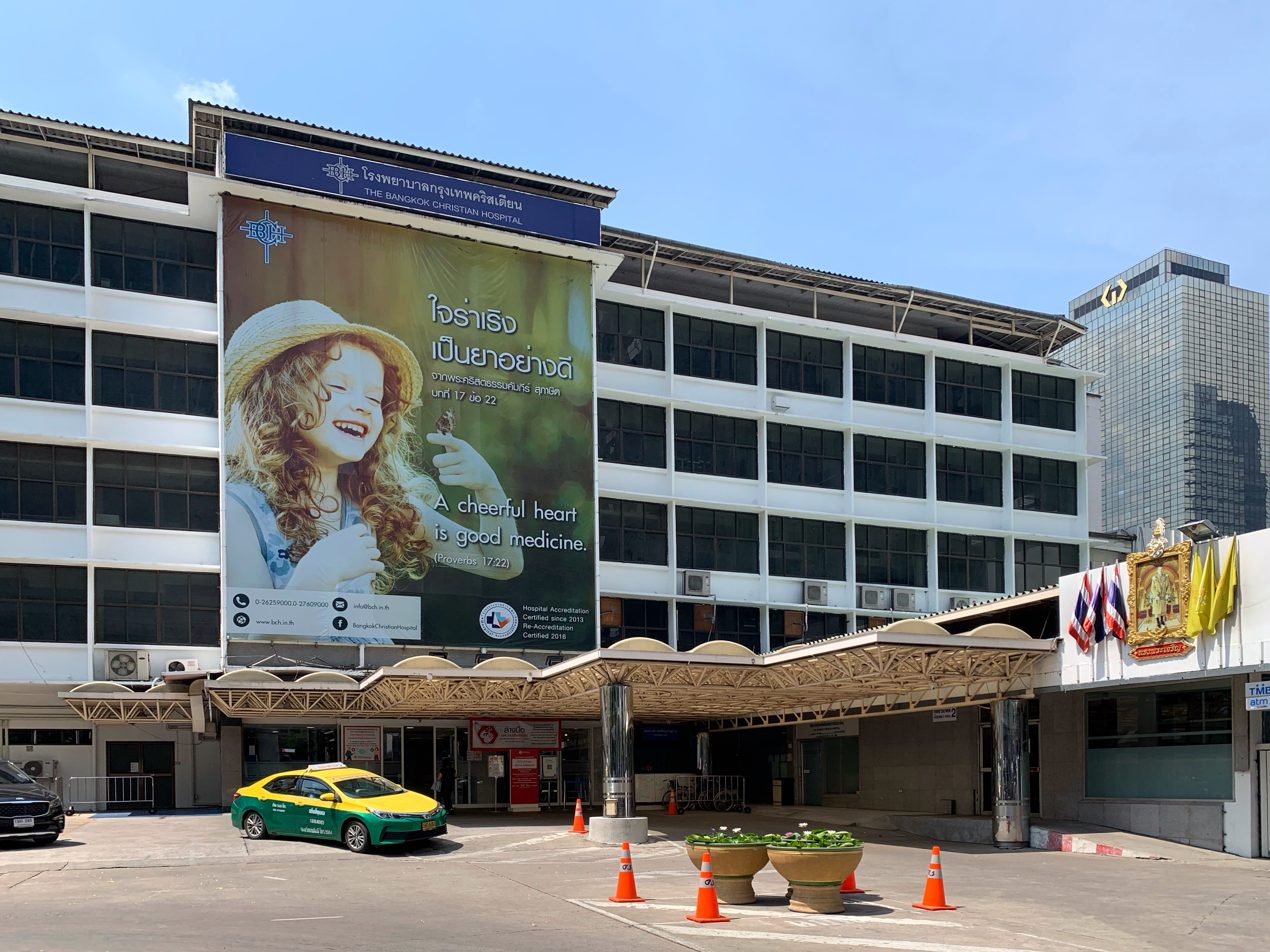
Bangkok Christian Hospital of Protestantism in Thailand

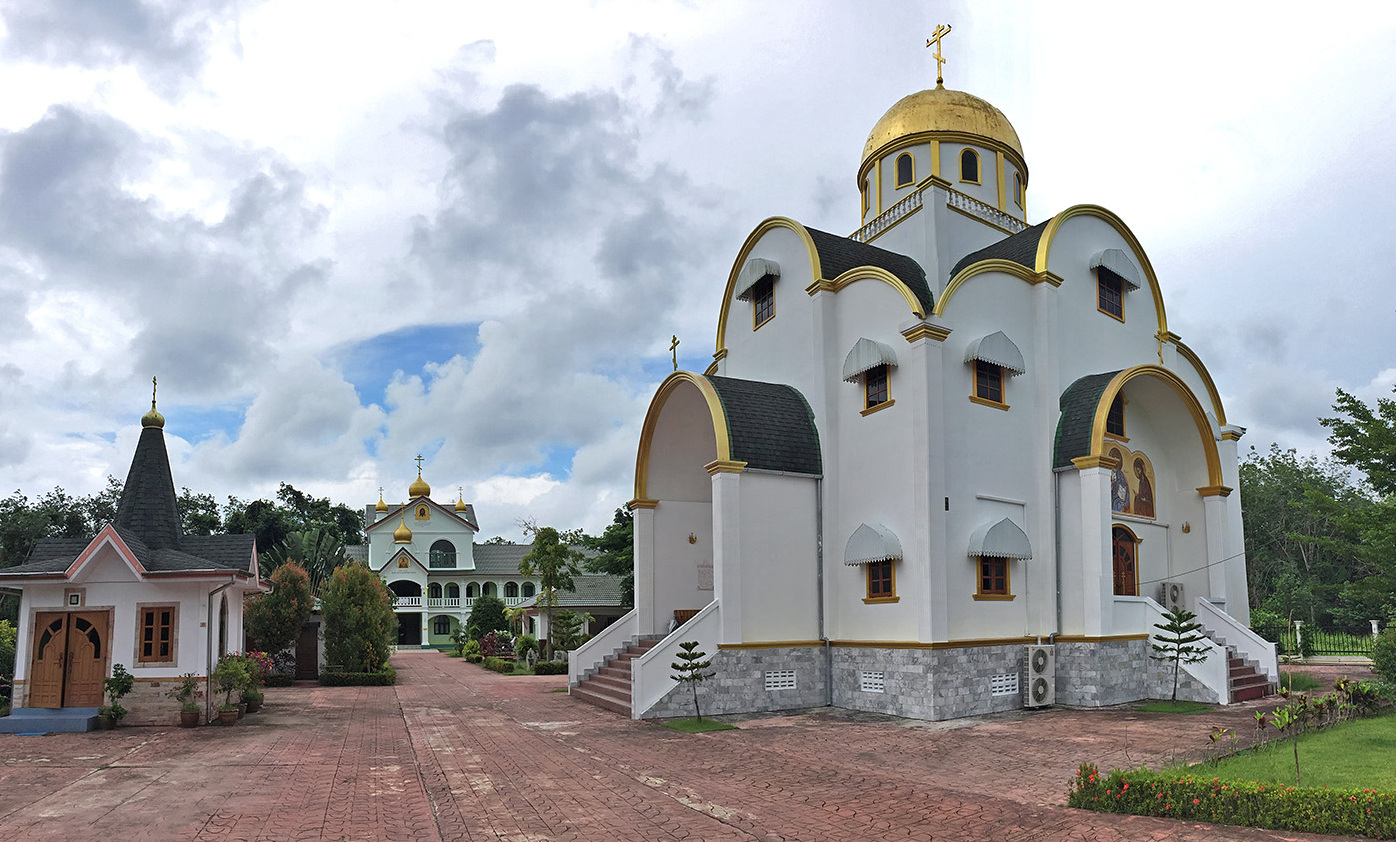
Holy Trinity Church in Phuket of Orthodoxy in Thailand

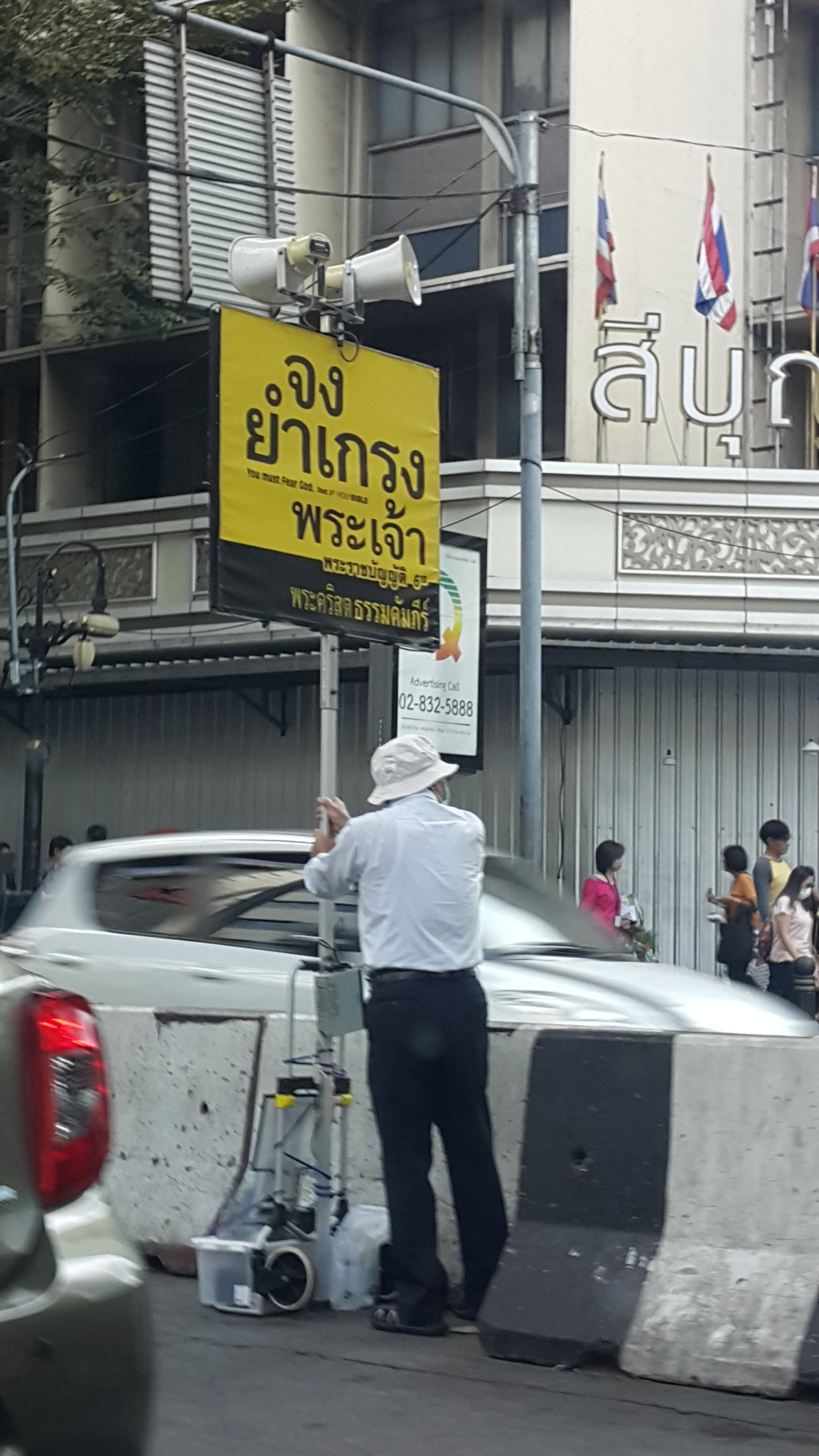
A sign promoting Bible studies in Bangkok

It was believed by some scholars that Christianity was first introduced to Thailand by European missionaries. By 2021, there were nearly 1 million Christians in Thailand, or 1.4% of the predominantly Buddhist national population. Christians are numerically and organizationally concentrated in northern Thailand, where they make up an estimated 16% of the population in some lowland districts (e.g., Chomtong, Chiang Mai) and up to very high percentages in tribal districts (e.g., Mae Sariang, Mae Hong Son).

== History ==
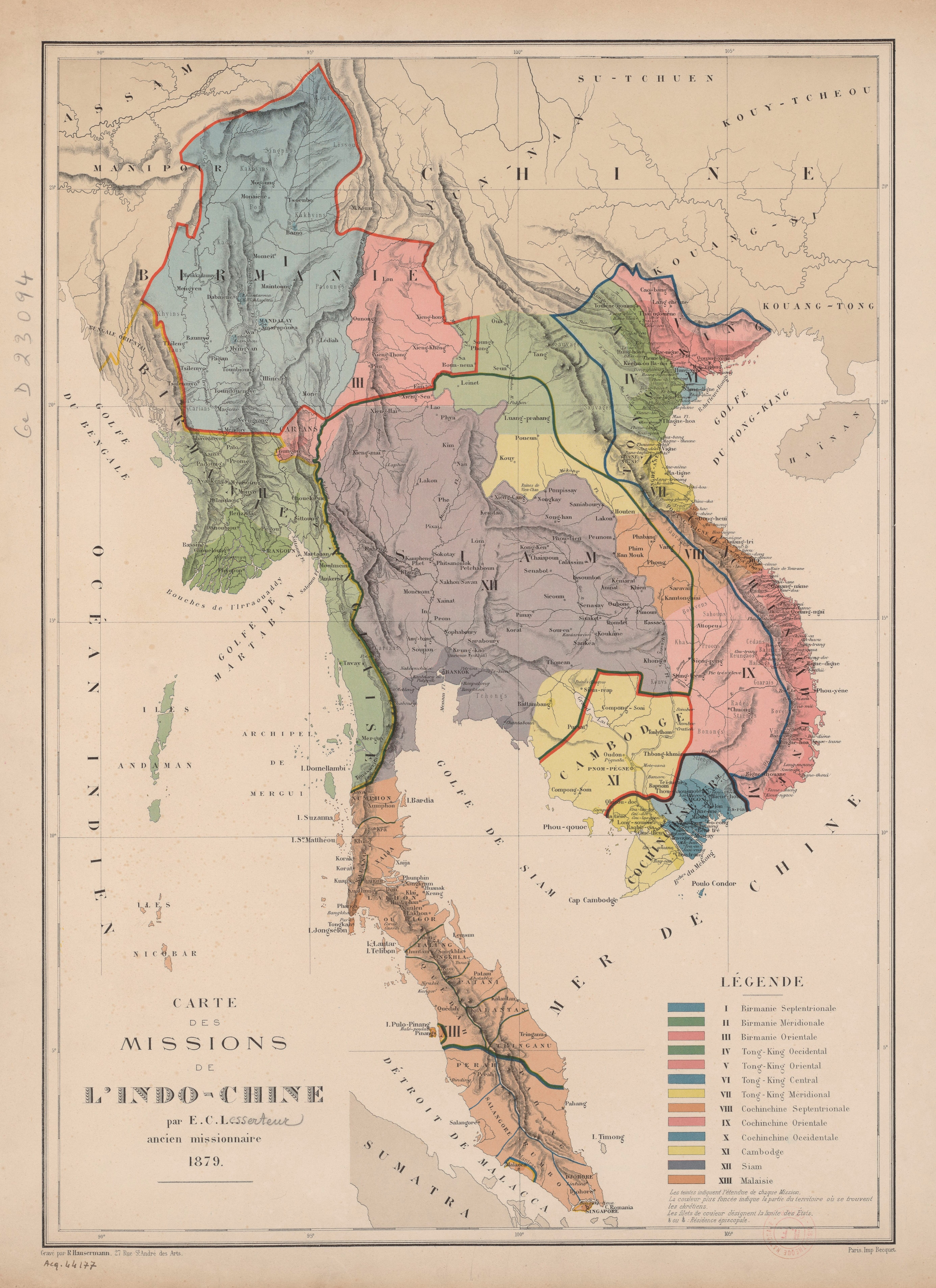
Missionary map of Indochina (Mainland Southeast Asia), 1879

Around 1510, the Italian merchant Ludovico di Varthema was accompanied in southeast Asia by two Christian guides from Sarnau (probably Shahr-i Naw, the Persian name for Ayutthaya). They told him that there were many Christians in Sarnau, even "great lords", that they were white men and that they owed their allegiance to the Great Khan of Cathay. Varthema also recorded that the King of Pegu employed 1,000 Christian soldiers recruited from the Ayutthaya Kingdom and that they wrote their script from right to left. Although it is probable that these accounts are exaggerated to impress westerners, it is possible that these first Christians in Thailand were descendants of Nestorians who had fled China after the fall of the Yuan dynasty in 1368. They would likely have used the Syriac script.

The modern history of Christianity in Thailand begins with the work of missionaries or foreign religious workers. In the 1550s the Portuguese mercenaries and their chaplain arrived in Ayutthaya. By 1660, the Vicariate Apostolic of Siam was established under the leadership particularly of Portuguese and French fathers. (Note: now the Archdiocese of Bangkok) Protestants appeared in the new capital of Bangkok in 1828 through the London Missionary Society representative, Jacob Tomlin and the Netherlands Missionary Society representative, Karl Augustinus Gützlaff and after them, American Board of Commissioners for Foreign Missions representative, David Abeel followed by Rev. Jesse Casswell and Dr. Dan Beach Bradley. These two both switched affiliations to the American Missionary Association (AMA) in 1848 over their support for the Finney revival emphasis on "perfectionism" that the Congregationalist parent organization found unorthodox, effectively ending the work of the ABCFM in Siam.

American Baptists arrived in Thailand in 1833 and American Presbyterians in 1840. Daniel McGilvary and William Clifton Dodd were important names in the formation of the Church in Lanna Kingdom of Northern Thailand. Burmese Karen evangelists and Dr. John Sung of China were part of the early evangelistic efforts to Thailand up until World War II. Other waves of European and American Protestant missions to Thailand included the Christian and Missionary Alliance in the 1930s and then again after World War II. Korean and other Asian missionaries came in increasing numbers from the 1970s through the 1990s, such as Dr. Kosuke Koyama of Japan.

The Laos Mission founded its first church, Chiang Mai Church, now known simply as First Church, Chiang Mai, in 1868. After a brief period of evangelistic success, the mission underwent a time of persecution in 1869, during which two converts were martyred. This persecution was abated in 1878 by the Edict of Religious Toleration. Parishes and congregations experienced sporadic numerical growth. The activities of missionaries were predominantly in itinerant preaching, medical institutions and educational facilities as well as the introduction of technologies, methodologies and institutional culture which have been generally well received by the Thai people. They were occasionally able to mobilize large numbers of Thai helpers. Since World War II control of Christian organizations was slowly turned over to Thai Christians and the institutions integrated as private institutions in an increasingly centralized Thailand.

Relations between Christian organizations and the central government have improved. In the 1980s, Thai royal budget for programs of Christian groups appeared for the first time. Evidence of this support includes 15,000 Baht given by the Department of Religion to District 14 of the Church of Christ in Thailand for youth outreach as well as waiving of the cost of tickets on trains for missionaries and for Thai pastors of the denomination.

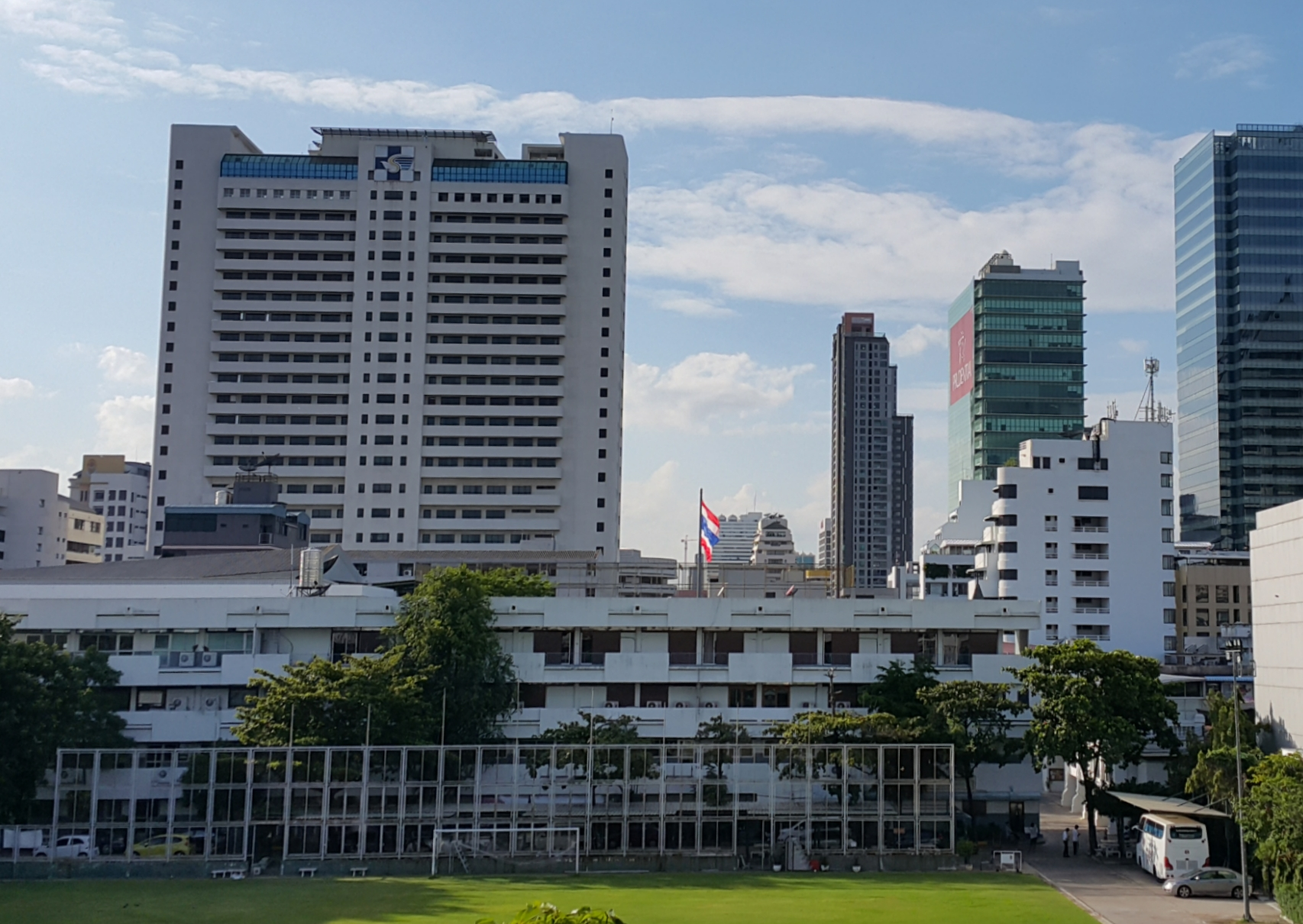
Saint Louis Hospital in Bangkok

Christians are making substantial contributions to health care and education in Thailand. Facilities such as Saint Louis Hospital, Bangkok Mission Hospital, Camillian Hospital, Bangkok Christian Hospital were once considered to be among the best in the country. Major Christian schools dot the map of Thailand. European and American missionaries introduced the printing press, western surgery, smallpox vaccinations, taught foreign languages and wrote linguistic dictionaries. Thai and Western Christians in the past 50 years, especially those in the Church of Christ in Thailand denomination, have been heavily engaged in administrative reform of church organizations, ecumenical and interreligious dialogue, social development projects, enculturation or adaptation of the Gospel for Thai culture and have been active in providing leadership in the Thai democracy movement, refugee relief, and improving the status of women, the handicapped and children.

Interreligious dialogue is evidenced by such programs as the Saengtum Seminary, the Sinclair Thompson Lecture Series of Payap University, a Thailand Church History Project coordinated by the Rev. Dr. Herbert Swanson in the 1990s and an Institute for Interreligious Dialogue at Payap University. In November 2007, Bangkok's Assumption Cathedral became the venue of ecumenical pilgrimage of trust, when Christians from different backgrounds gathered to pray together. Among those present were religious leaders of the Catholic Church, the Evangelical Lutheran Church of Thailand, the Church of Christ in Thailand, the Russian Orthodox Church and also young people from Laos, the Philippines, Hong Kong, Singapore and Malaysia who came specially for the prayer meetings. Similar programs of worship have been held annually at First Church (Chiang Mai) and elsewhere across Thailand.

Non-denominational efforts and inter-agency coordination have involved such agencies as the Church's AIDS Ministry, Voice of Peace, Lamp of Thailand, World Vision, Worldwide Faith Missions, Christian Children's Fund, McKean Leprosy Hospital (now McKean Rehabilitation Institute), Klong Thuy Slum Ministries, and the Christian Development Fellowship. Thailand has served as the destination of choice in Asian Christian gatherings and has served as the headquarters of the Christian Conference of Asia since the handover of Hong Kong.

== Numbers ==
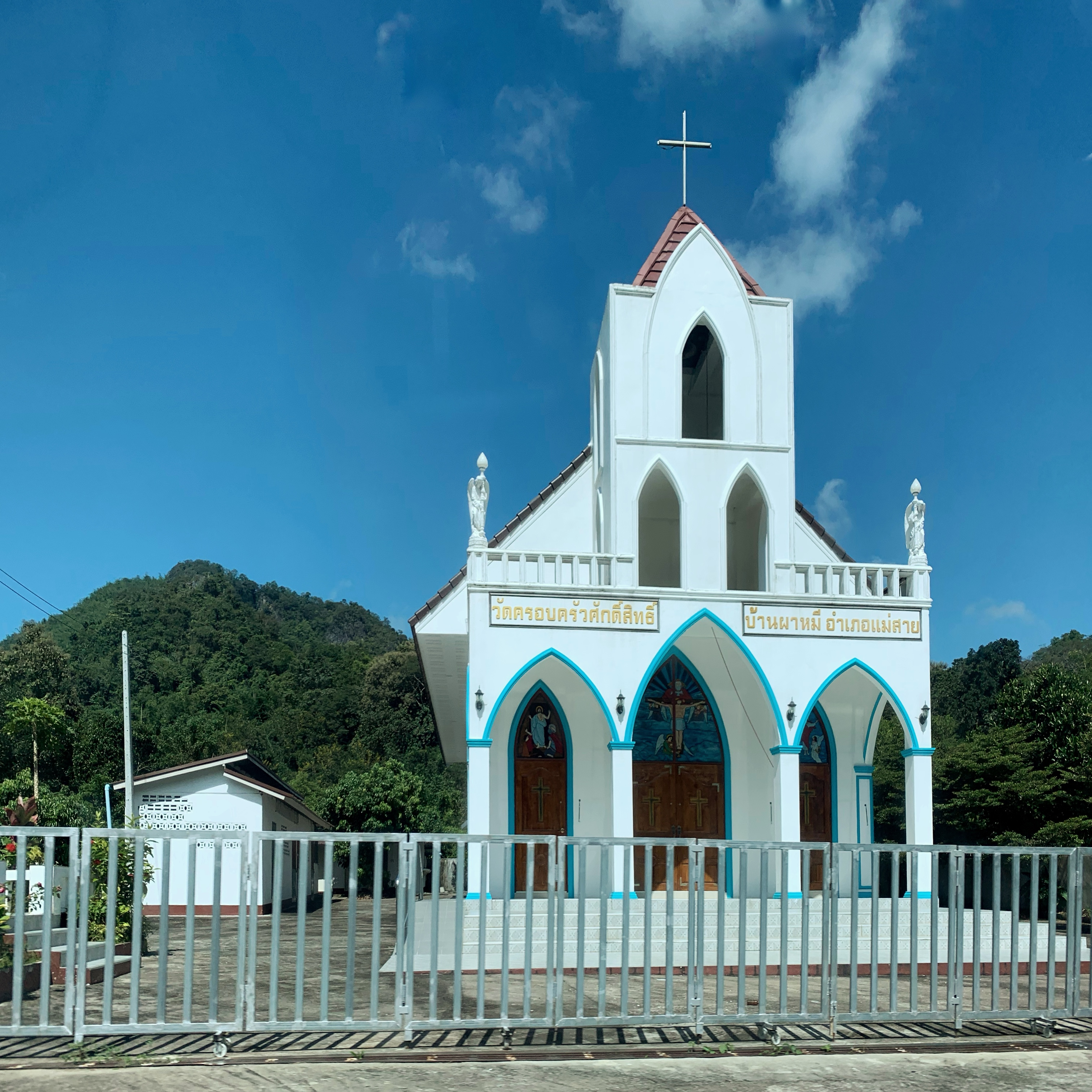
A church in an Akha village, Mae Sai District, Chiang Rai Province; an example of Christianity in Ahka Villages

There are many sources for estimating the affiliation of Thai people in Christian denominations. The primary sources are from the government population data and from the membership records of the individual denominations. Reliable data on determining religious affiliation are not based on objective standards in all cases. The most objective report that counts individuals is government census data. Less objective standards would seek to include theological criteria in the counting of members such as belief, baptism, confirmation as well as age criteria such as persons over age 12, 15, 18 or adulthood. None of these standards of various denominational data discriminate based on gender, health or ethnicity.

Government data are based on the National House Register in which heads of households register the members of the household with the local District Office. At birth, persons declare their religious affiliation in this manner. A national census is taken of this data every 10 years. As of 2000, the latest [national census data] currently available, 486,840 people were registered as affiliates of Christian denominations or under 1% (0.7%) of total population (60 million). Comparisons of this data to determine whether Christians in Thailand are predominantly a certain gender, age or are from urban/rural areas does not show any remarkable variation from the near 1% figure, although the age group of 10-14 shows the highest (1.0%) ratio of Christians to national population. There may be limitations to this approach to verifying religious affiliation, such as inconsistent reporting, the change of religion to Christianity of young people under their parents' house register, reversion of young people to Buddhism and local administrative bias towards Buddhism. However, no available evidence currently demonstrates these limitations. Religious denominations each report different sets of affiliation data. The next official census is scheduled for 2010.

Evangelical Fellowship of Thailand data come from the individual organizations that work under its auspices, since membership in the EFT is open to church organizations. It was recognized by the Department of Religion as a Christian denomination in Thailand on June 19, 1969, as a locus for a plethora of small groups that had been in Thailand at least since 1929 when the Christian and Missionary Alliance established its presence in Thailand.

The Church of Christ in Thailand, founded in 1934, is a member of the World Council of Churches, Christian Conference of Asia and World Reformed Alliance. The CCT generally only counts adult baptized members as reported by its districts, which the CCT then reports at its annual General Assembly meeting. In 2008, the CCT reported 120,000 members divided into 19 districts. Of the parts of the Church of Christ in Thailand, 52,601 were of Baptist origin. Southern Baptist Convention and Seventh-day Adventists have other criteria.

== Catholicism ==
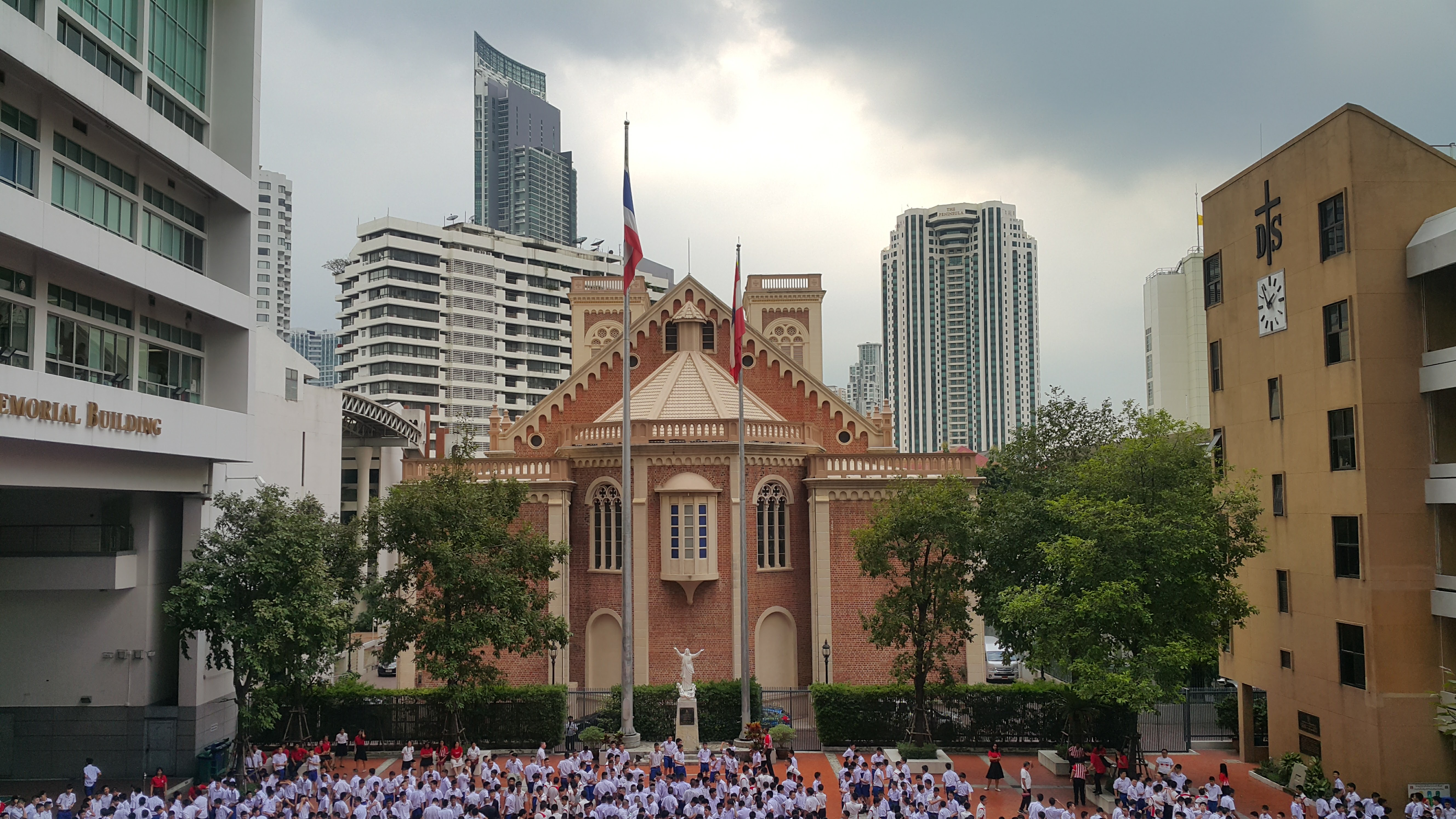
Assumption Cathedral, the seat of the archdiocese of Bangkok and its Assumption College

The earliest Catholic missionaries in Siam were Friars Jeronimo da Cruz and Sebastiâo da Canto, both Dominicans, who came in 1567. They were killed by the Burmese in 1569. Later, the Franciscans and Jesuits arrived. The 17th, 18th, and 19th centuries were marked by alternating periods of toleration and persecution of missionaries by the Siamese rulers.

By the beginning of the 20th century, there were about 23,000 Catholic adherents, 55 churches and chapels, representatives of monastic orders, and social and educational institutions (orphanages, schools and a seminary and college). Many Catholic missionaries arrived in the first half of the 20th century. As of 2019, Thailand has about 400,000 Catholics. On 22 October 1989, the catechist Philip Siphong Onphitak and six companions (nuns and laymen), who had been executed by Thai police during the Franco-Thai War of 1940 on the suspicion that they were French spies, were beatified as the Martyrs of Thailand.

Among the Catholic orders present in the country are:

- Salesians
- Salesian Sisters of Don Bosco
- Redemptorists
- Camillians
- Montfort Brothers of St. Gabriel
- De La Salle Brothers
- Jesuits
- Franciscans
- Sisters of St. Paul of Chartres
- Good Shepherd Sisters
- Sisters of the Sacred Heart of Jesus
- Society of Mary (Marists)
- Divine Word Missionaries
- Sisters of Charity of St. Vincent de Paul
- Carmelite Missionaries
- Congregation of the Mission
- Missionary Oblates of Mary Immaculate.

Catholics are represented by various dioceses.

== Protestantism ==
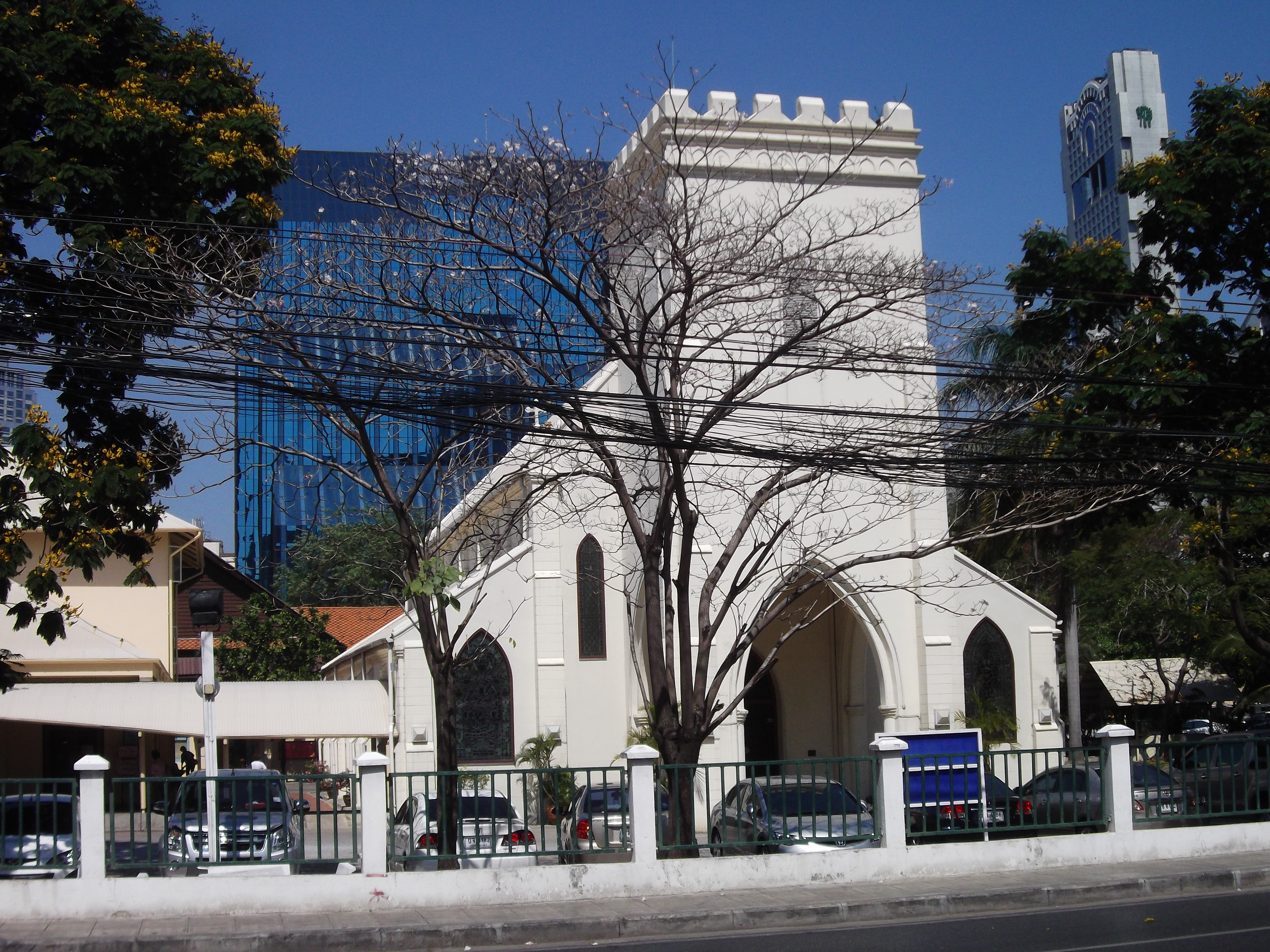
Christ Church, an Anglican church in Bangkok

There are several Protestant umbrella organizations. The oldest of them is Church of Christ in Thailand (CCT) formed in 1934. It consists of Thai, Chinese, Korean, and English-speaking congregations. It is a member of the World Council of Churches and has about 60,000 members. One of the largest Protestant associations is the Evangelical Fellowship of Thailand. Baptists and Seventh-day Adventists are recognized by local authorities as separate Protestant denominations and organized under the same umbrella group. In 2006, the Gospel Church Foundation of Thailand, also known as the TCMA (Thai Christian and Missionary Alliance) was part of the worldwide body of the Christian and Missionary Alliance.

Among the other Protestant groups represented in Thailand are Lutherans, Adventists, Methodists, Pentecostal and Charismatic Christians, and the Anglican Church in Thailand, which is a deanery of the Diocese of Singapore, itself part of the larger Church of the Province of Southeast Asia. There is a recent increase of evangelical Christian ministries operating throughout the country. There are many foreign missionaries and residents who are establishing churches and prayer groups throughout Thailand. One of the largest, Youth with a Mission, currently has over 200 full-time foreign staff and over 100 Thai staff, ministering in 20 locations. Another evangelistic missionary organization, OMF International, has an outreach to place Christian teachers in the kingdom's schools. There is currently only one openly LGBT affirming church in Thailand, All Saints Chiang Mai, located in the northern province of Chiang Mai.

== Thailand Bible Society ==
The Thailand Bible Society was officially established in 1966, though its organized work began in 1828. Part of the Bible in Thai was first published in 1834. The New Testament in Thai was printed for the first time in 1843. The first full text of the Bible in Thai came out in 1883. In 2005, the Thailand Bible Society distributed 43,740 copies of the Bible and 9,629 copies of the New Testament in Thai language.

== Eastern Orthodoxy ==
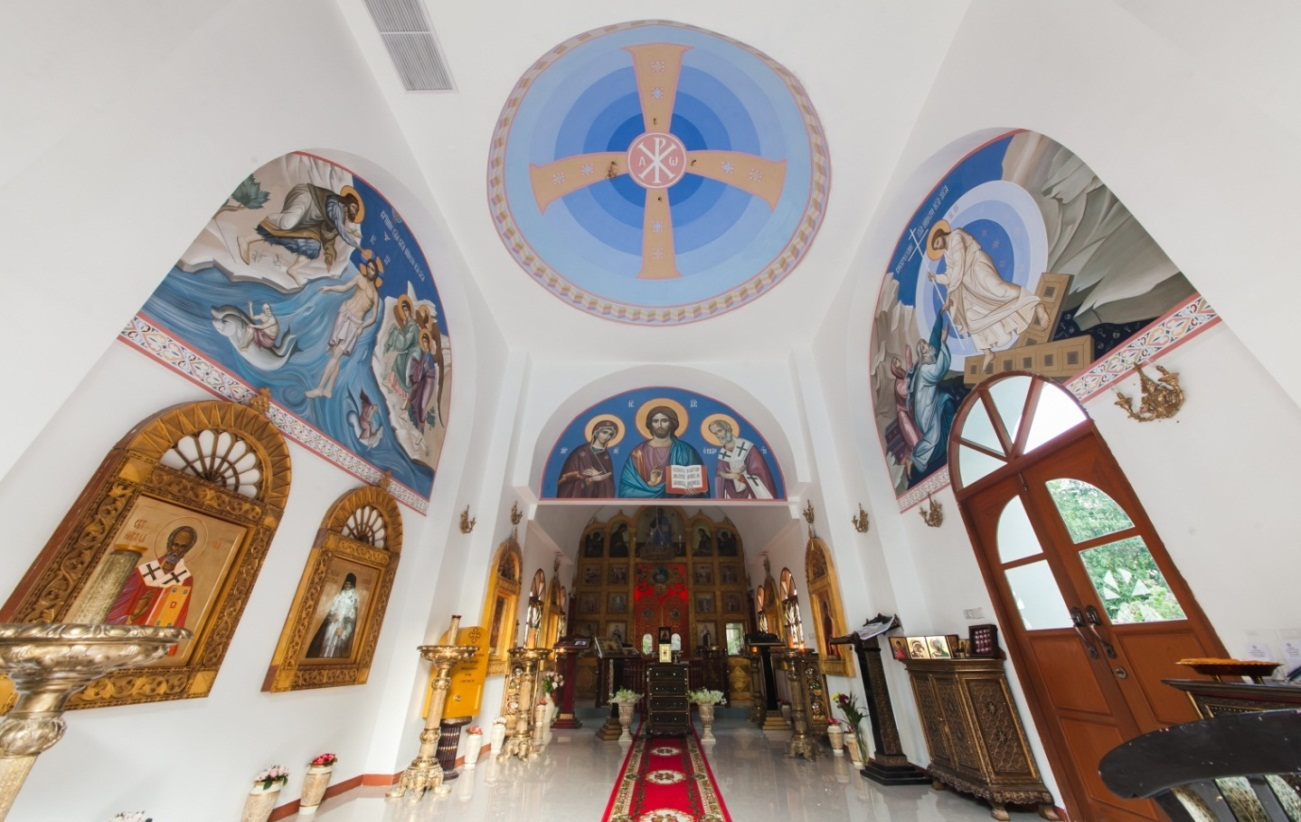
Ascension Church, a Russian Orthodox church in Ko Samui

Orthodoxy in Thailand is presented by the Representative Office of Russian Orthodox Church, including the Orthodox parish of Saint Nicolas in Bangkok.

Besides main parish of Saint Nicholas' Cathedral in Bangkok, there are several Russian Orthodox communes including:

- Parish in the name of Holy Life-Giving Trinity on Phuket island,
- Parish in the name of All Saints in Chonburi province,
- Parish in the name of Holy Dormition, Ratchaburi province,
- The Holy Ascension parish in Samui island, Surat Thani province.

The mission is headed by Father Oleg Cherepanin (by 2008 information) and serves not only Russian tourists and residents in Thailand, but also local believers of Thai origin.

The Russian Orthodox Church has translated into the Thai language the Divine Liturgy of St. John Chrysostom, the Orthodox Book of prayer and a book about the history of Russian Orthodox Church. In July, 2008, the representative office of Russian Orthodox Church was officially registered by Thailand authorities as a foundation named the "Orthodox Christian Church in Thailand."

The Ecumenical Patriarch Bartholomew and the Holy and Great Synod of the Ecumenical Patriarchate of the Eastern Orthodox Church also have plans to establish their parishes in Thailand. They have often organized Church services and Divine Liturgy for their members in Thailand with the help of the Embassy of Greece in Bangkok.

== Freedom of religion ==
Due to ethnic violence in the south, in 2023, the country was scored 3 out of 4 for religious freedom.

== See also ==
- Religion in Thailand
