= Protestantism in Thailand =

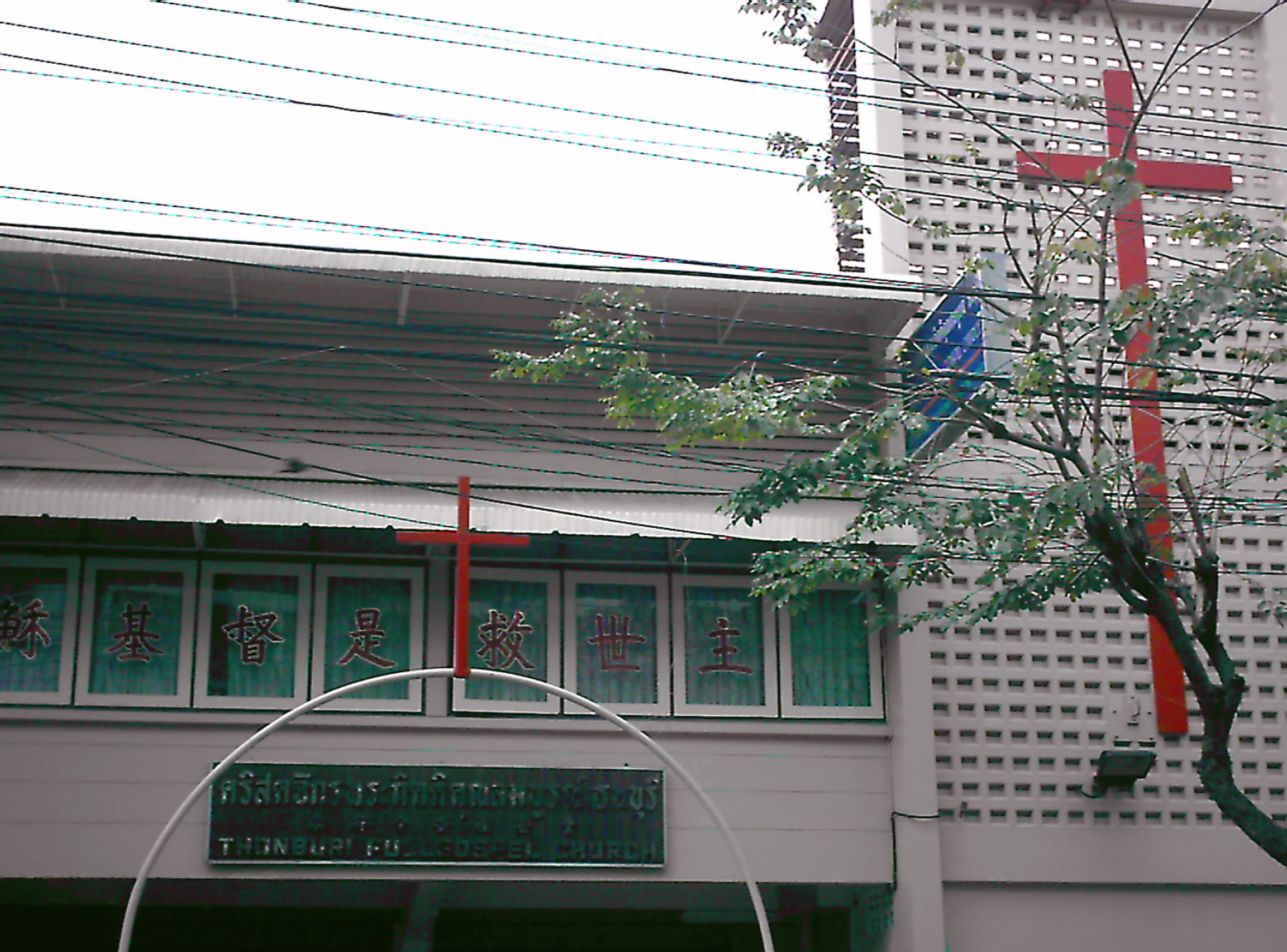
Thonburi Full Gospel Church

Protestants in Thailand constitute about 0.77% of the population of Thailand. Protestant work among the Thai people was begun by Ann Judson in Burma, who evangelized Thai war captives who were relocated to Burma. Protestantism was introduced to the country of Thailand in 1828 through the work of Karl Gutzlaff and Jacob Tomlin, the first two resident Protestant missionaries in Thailand.

== Protestant Denominations ==
There are five Christian groups legally recognized by the Thai government, including the following Protestant groups: Church of Christ in Thailand, the Evangelical Fellowship of Thailand, and the Thailand Baptist Convention.

The Church of Christ in Thailand (CCT) is perhaps the largest Protestant denomination in Thailand and is the oldest denomination, being founded in 1934 by a merger of American Presbyterian and American Baptist churches. Since that time, several other Protestant groups have joined the CCT, including Lutherans from the German Marburger Mission and churches started by the Disciples of Christ. The denomination consists of Thai, Chinese, Karen, Lahu, and English-speaking congregations. It is a member of the World Council of Churches and has about 130,000 members.

The Evangelical Fellowship of Thailand (EFT) is an evangelical umbrella organization that includes many smaller denominations, churches, missionary organizations, and parachurch ministries. It is not a denomination, but a collection of different groups for the purposes of reporting to the government and inter-denominational co-operation.

The Thailand Baptist Convention is a small denomination of Baptist churches that was started by American missionaries from the Southern Baptist Convention.

There are also many independent churches and groups in Thailand, including many Pentecostal and charismatic groups. The most notable Pentecostal groups are Hope of Bangkok church, Jai Saman church, and the Rom Klao association of churches.

Among the other Protestant groups represented in Thailand are Lutherans, Baptists, Christian and Missionary Alliance, Adventists, Methodists, Pentecostals and charismatics, and Anglicans. Anglican Churches in Thailand belong to the Anglican Church in Thailand, a deanery of the Diocese of Singapore of the Church of the Province of South East Asia. The Church of Jesus Christ of Latter-day Saints also has a presence in the country.

== Evangelical parachurch ministries ==
There are many evangelical parachurch Christian ministries operating throughout the country, with some being newly founded small churches. Foreign missionaries and residents are establishing churches and prayer groups throughout Thailand. One of the largest is Youth with a Mission, which has over 200 full-time foreign staff and over 100 Thai staff, ministering in 20 locations. Another evangelistic missionary organization, OMF International, has an outreach to place Christian teachers in the Kingdom's schools. In the large cities like Bangkok, Pattaya, and Chiang Mai, numerous ministries are operating in hotel conference rooms, storefronts, and other rented facilities as an outreach to the local residents.

== Protestant hospitals ==
Bangkok Adventist Mission Hospital and Bangkok Christian Hospital are Protestant-affiliated hospitals in Bangkok.

== Bible ministry ==
United Bible Society began to work in Thailand in 1828. In 1966, Thailand Bible Society was officially established, though its organised work began in 1828. Part of the Bible in Thai was first published in 1834. The New Testament in Thai was printed for the first time in 1843. The first full collection of Bible texts in Thai came out in 1883. In 2005, Thailand Bible Society distributed 43,740 copies of the Bible and 9,629 copies of New Testament in the Thai language.

Gideons International's "Scripture Blitz" was held in Thailand in November 2005, where 227,295 Bibles were placed by a team of 30 men from around the world.

== See also ==
- Church of Christ in Thailand
- Christian Care Foundation for Children with Disabilities
- Christianity in Thailand
- Gideons International
- Hope Academy Foundation
