= Eastern Orthodox Church in Thailand =

Orthodox Church in Thailand ศาสนจักรออร์โธดอกซ์ในประเทศไทย
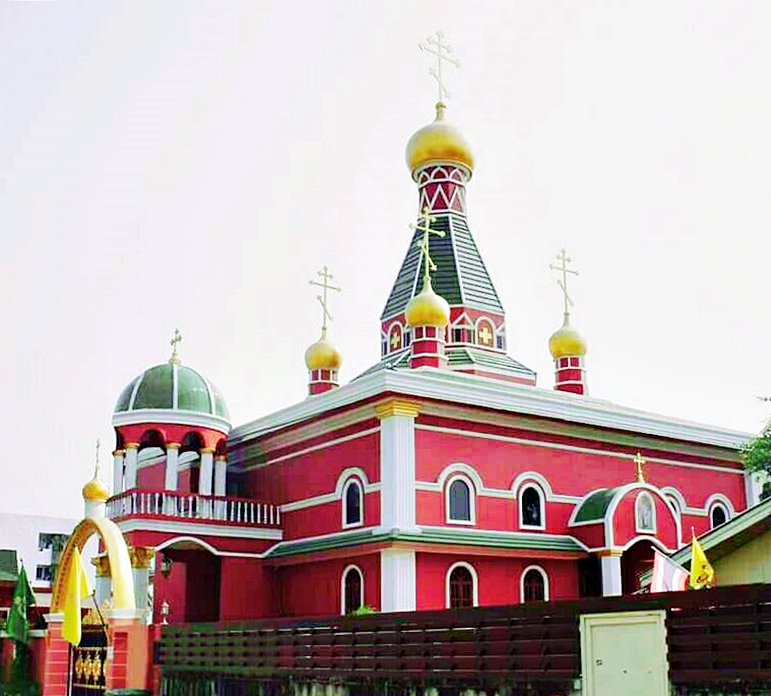
- St.Nicholas Cathedral in Bangkok

Location
- Territory: Thailand
- Headquarters: Bangkok, Thailand

Statistics
- Population: Total: estimated

Information
- Denomination: Eastern Orthodox
- Sui iuris church: Autonomous church of Eastern Orthodoxy under the omophorion of the Russian Orthodox Church
- Language: Russian, Thai and English

Website
- www.orthodox.or.th

Eastern Orthodox Christianity in Thailand has been represented since 1999 by the Representative Office of the Russian Orthodox Church, including the Orthodox parish of Saint Nicolas in Bangkok (Russian Orthodox Church Moscow Patriarchate).

== Russian Orthodox church ==
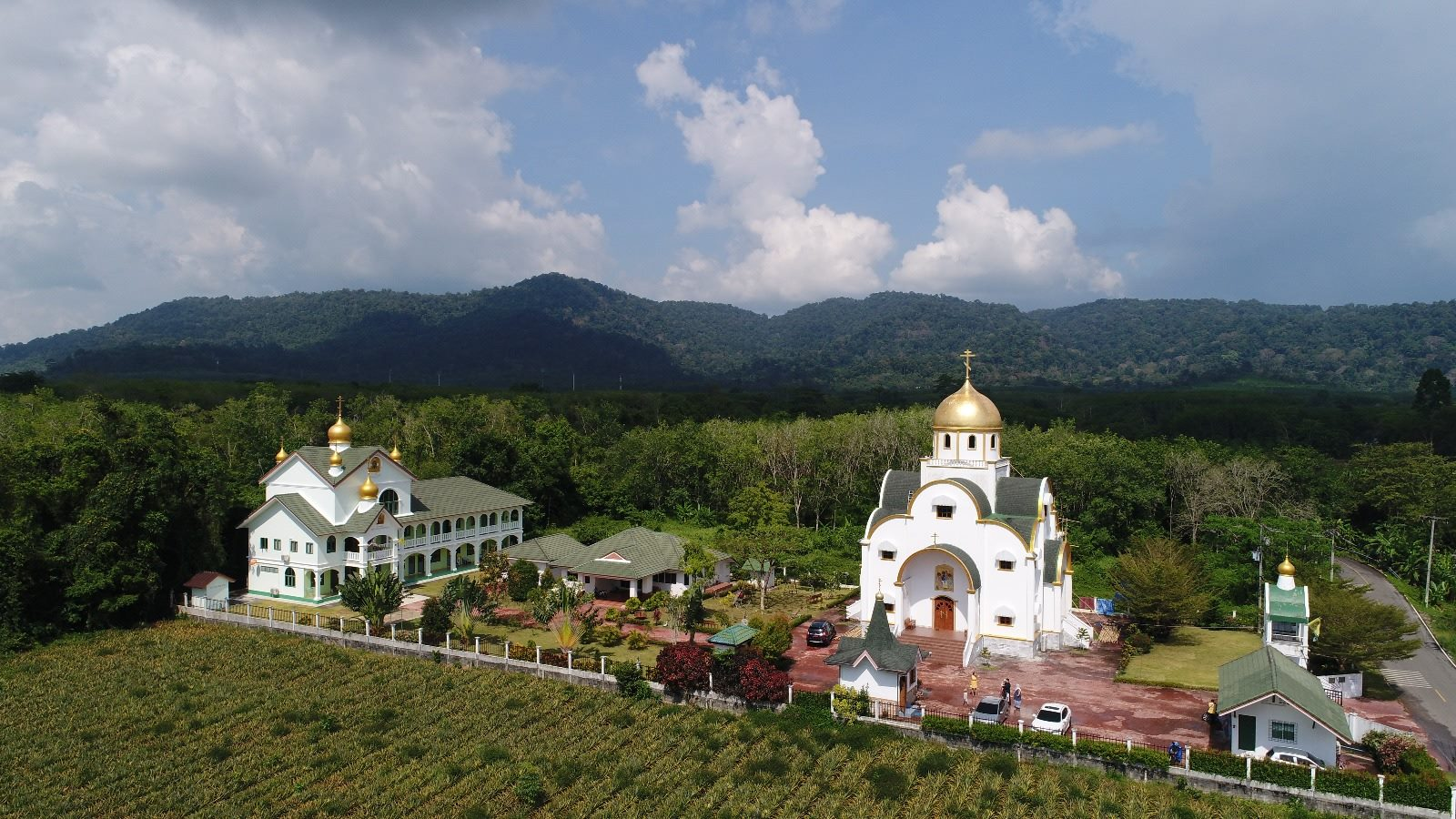
Holy Trinity Church in Phuket

The mission is headed by Father (Archimandrite) Oleg Cherepanin (2008) and serves Russian tourists or citizens in Thailand, local believers of Thai origin and people of other nationalities, including Romanians, Greeks, French.

Besides the main parish of St. Nicholas Cathedral in Bangkok, there are several Russian Orthodox communes including:

- Holy Trinity Church in Phuket
- All Saints Church in Pattaya
- Protection of Mother of God Church in Pattaya
- Dormition of the Mother of God Monastery in Ratchaburi Province
- The Holy Ascension Church in Ko Samui, Surat Thani Province
- St. Sergius of Radonezh Church in Ko Chang Trat Province
- St. Vladimir Church in Chiang Mai
- Holy Royal Martyrs Church in Hua Hin
- St. Seraphim of Sarov in Ko Pha-ngan Surat Thani Province

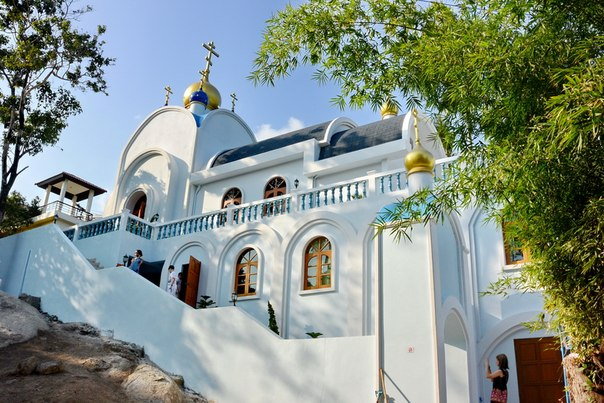
Orthodox Church of the Holy Ascension on Samui island

The mission of Russian Orthodox Church since its establishment translated into Thai language the Divine Liturgy of St. John Chrysostom, the Orthodox Book of prayer and the book about the history of Russian Orthodox Church. In July 2008, the representative office of Russian Orthodox Church was officially registered by Thailand authorities as foundation the Orthodox Christian Church in Thailand.

In November 2007, Father Oleg Cherepanin took part in ecumenical pilgrimage of trust in Bangkok's Assumption Cathedral. Among those present were religious leaders of Roman Catholic Church, Evangelical Lutheran Church of Thailand, Church of Christ in Thailand, Russian Orthodox Church and young people from Laos, Philippines, Hong Kong, Singapore, and Malaysia who came specially for the prayer.

The year 2009 was marked by the visit to Thailand of the Russian Orthodox Church delegation headed by Archbishop Hilarion Alfeyev to celebrate the 10th anniversary of Orthodoxy in the country.

== See also ==
- Religion in Thailand
- Christianity in Thailand
