= Bangkok Christian =

Bangkok Christian may refer to:

- Bangkok Christian College, a private boys' school in Bangkok, Thailand
- Bangkok Christian Hospital, a hospital in Bangkok
- Bangkok Christian College F.C., Thai football club
