= Thailand Bible Society =

Thailand Bible Society (Thai: สมาคมพระคริสตธรรมไทย) is a non-denominational Christian organization dedicated to translating and distributing the Bible and selected books of the Bible in Thailand. The Thailand Bible Society is a member of the United Bible Societies Association.

The Society was officially established in 1966, though its organised work began in 1828. In 2005, the Society distributed 43,740 copies of the Bible and 9,629 copies of the New Testament in the Thai language.

Part of the Bible in Thai was first published in 1834 by Baptist missionary John Taylor Jones. The New Testament in Thai was printed for the first time in 1843. The first full Bible in Thai came out in 1893. The Thai Standard Version was published by the Thailand Bible Society in 1971, and later revised, updated, and republished in 2011.

== See also ==
- Religion in Thailand
- Christianity in Thailand
