= Evangelical Fellowship of Thailand =

- สหกิจคริสเตียนแห่งประเทศไทย
- Founded: 1969; 57 years ago
- Type: Evangelical organization
- Headquarters: Bangkok
- Region served: Thailand
- Affiliations: World Evangelical Alliance
- Website: eft.or.th

The Evangelical Fellowship of Thailand (Thai: สหกิจคริสเตียนแห่งประเทศไทย) is a national evangelical alliance in Thailand, member of the World Evangelical Alliance. It is a group of over 3,000 evangelical churches, and various parachurch organizations, and foundations, and is one of five Christian groups legally recognized by the Thai government. The headquarters is in Bangkok, Thailand.

== History ==
Following World War II, many evangelical missionary groups began missionary work in Thailand. These varied evangelical groups worked independently from both the CCT and each other, but in the mid-1950s a number of them decided that inter-denominational and inter-organizational co-operation and fellowship was needed. This desire on the part of both evangelical missionaries and Thai Christian leaders led to the formation of the Evangelical Fellowship of Thailand (EFT). The EFT was formally recognized as a legal entity on June 19, 1969, and its first moderator was Rev. Suk Phongnoi.

== 21st century ==
As of 2023, it had 3,090 member local churches.

In the same year, the president is Prof. Dr. Teera Jenpiriyaprayoon.

== Affiliations ==
The EFT is a member and active participant in the Thailand Protestant Churches Coordinating Committee, whose goal is to promote evangelism and discipleship among Protestant churches in Thailand.

== See also ==
- Religion in Thailand
- Christianity in Thailand
