= St Joseph's Church, Ayutthaya =

Church building in Thailand

Coordinates: 14°20′19″N 100°32′53″E

St Joseph's Church
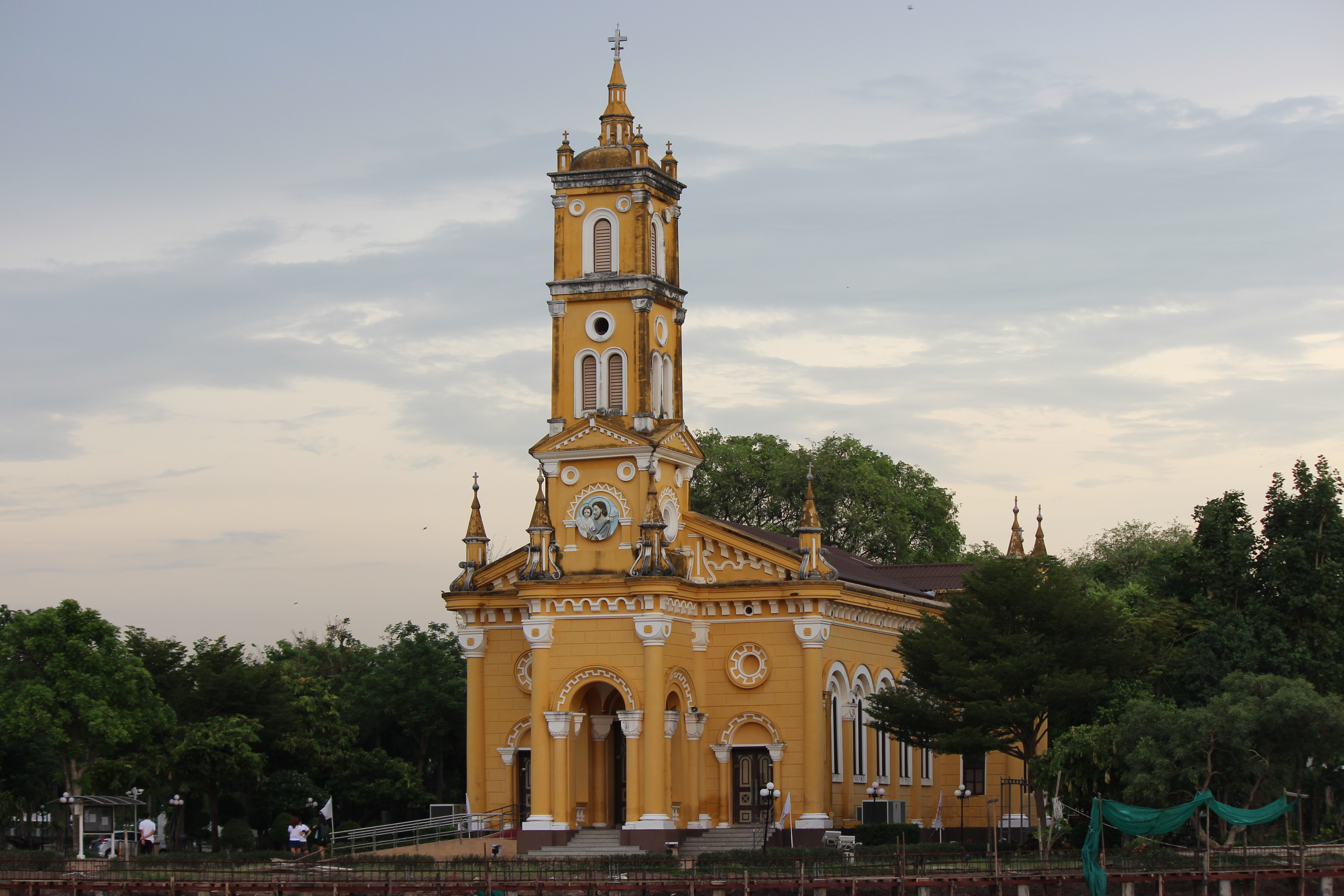
- St Joseph's Church
- Address: Samphao Lom, Phra Nakhon Si Ayutthaya district, Ayutthaya, Thailand
- Denomination: Roman Catholic

History
- Status: Active
- Founded: 1666

Architecture
- Architect: Joachim Grassi
- Style: Romanesque
- Years built: 1883-1891

Administration
- Archdiocese: Bangkok

St Joseph's Church is a Roman Catholic church in Ayutthaya, Thailand. It is situated on the banks of the Chao Phraya River in the old city, in the place where the French Catholic mission was first established in Thailand. Although the first church on the site was founded in 1666, the current building was completed in 1891 to the design of Joachim Grassi.

== History ==
St Joseph's Church traces its history back to 1666 when a wooden church was built on the site by French Bishop, Pierre Lambert de la Motte, founder member of the newly established Paris Foreign Missions Society on land provided by King Narai of Ayutthaya Kingdom. Bishop Lambert arrived in Ayutthaya in 1662 from France, and was welcomed by several Portuguese missionaries and a Spanish priest who ministered to 2,000 Christians. In 1685, the wooden church was replaced by a chapel constructed using brick and mortar.

Under the beneficent rule of King Narai, Bishop Lambert was given free rein to evangelise, build churches and establish mission posts. Ayutthaya remained the principal mission station for a century until, in 1767, Ayutthaya was captured by the Burmese, and the church and ecclesiastical buildings were destroyed.

When Bishop Pallegoix arrived in Siam in the 1840s, he took charge of the mission at Ayutthaya, and in 1847 erected a chapel on the site of the old church. After Jean-Louis Vey took over the mission in 1883, the French architect Joaquim Grassi was commissioned to design a new church to replace the chapel. Built in the Romanesque style, the current church took eight years to complete, and the first mass was performed in 1891. With the last restoration of the church having been carried out by Cardinal Michael Michai Kitbunchu in 2003, the site has been a place of Catholic worship in Thailand for over 300 years.
