= Christianity in Akha Villages =

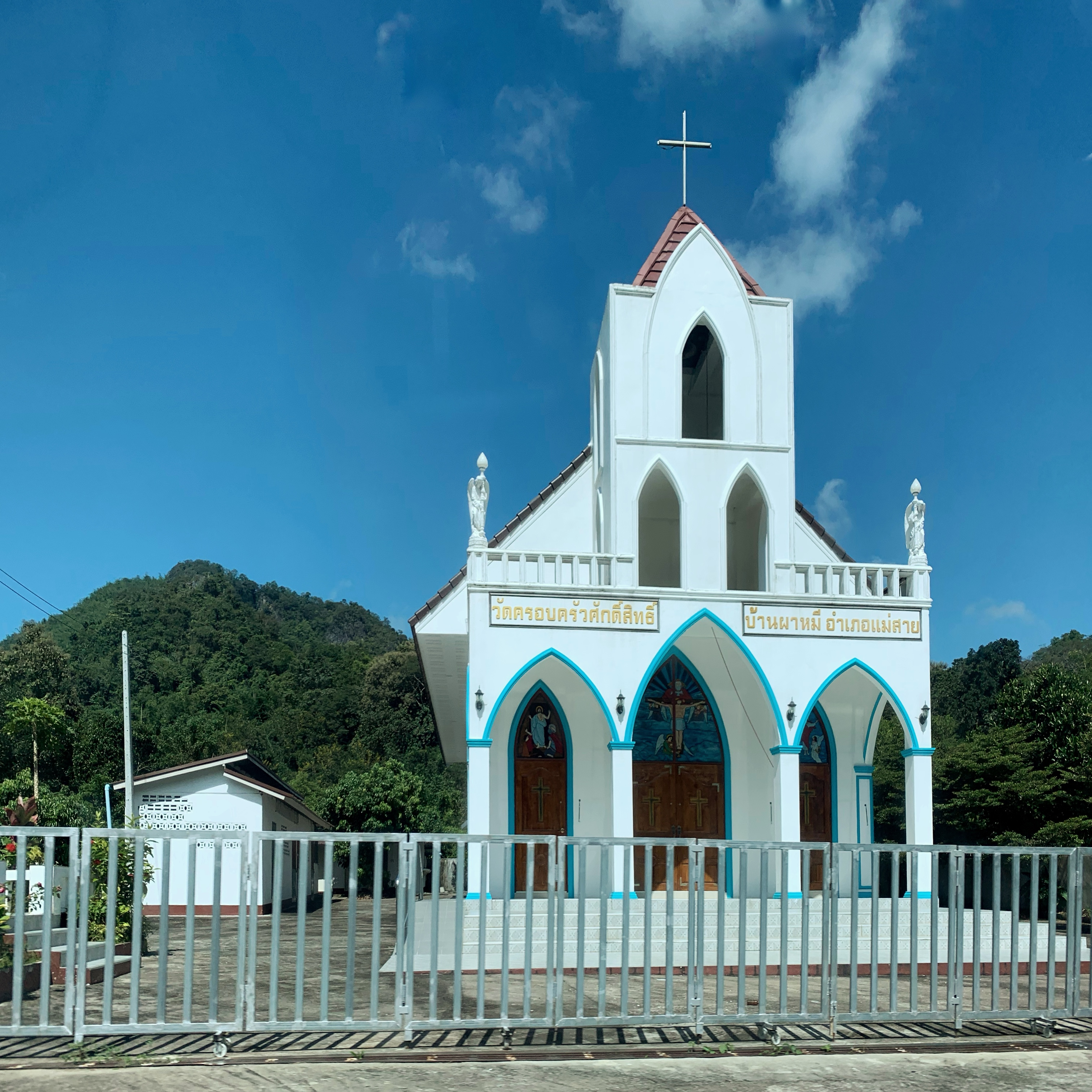
Holy Family Church in Ban Pha Mi, an Akha village in Mae Sai district, Chiang Rai province

The recorded arrival of Christianity to the Akha people in Thailand is in the 19th century.

The Akha Villages traditionally practice Akhazah, which is a religious as well as cultural belief system. Ahkazah is an animistic belief system with various rituals, festivals and spirits that permeate everyday life.

== Christianity in Akha villages ==
Catholic and American missionaries have infiltrated the traditional belief system of Ahka people by mass conversions of villages. Christian missionaries converted the oral Akha language into a written Latin letter alphabet and produced an Akha language dictionary for villagers to use. The American Evangelical movement and American Baptist movements were particularly strong in coercing conversion as these Akha villagers were some of the poorest in the world and missionaries offered villages the resources and services they desperately needed. Villages surrounded a village church but religion did not necessity a belief system. Chayan Vaddhanaphuti, an anthropologist at Chiang Mai University, described the conversion process: "They are assured education, scholarships and health services," he said. "It is these benefits and not religious passion that have attracted more hill-tribe people to convert." Chayan also says [In this new religion] "the shamans and the spirit and cultural leaders have no place," and "The old, traditional knowledge that has been passed down to the community comes to an end." Because of the stigma in Akhazah against writing down the religious beliefs, many Akhazah traditions die out in Christian villages. In villages that have not been converted, the Akha people consider Akhazah religion as part of their identity but in converted villages the Akha people believe they are just as Akha without Akhazah traditions. There are a growing number of missionaries, especially from the United States over the last 40 years. They have succeeded in converting over half of the 320 Akha tribes in Northern Thailand and are far more effective in conversions in Akha villages in Thailand than in Burma.

In Akha legend, all the people of the land, the Shan, the Thai, the Chinese and the Akha, were all given zah by the creator. All the other villagers went the creator with a loosely woven basket to receive the zah, only the Akha went with a tightly woven one so everyone else's zah fell out while the Akha man made it home with all the pieces, which is why Akhazah is expansive and hard. The difficulty and extensiveness of the Akhazah is why it was originally so hard to win converts but also why westernization helped Christians convert the Ahka in the last few decades. In Ahka culture, actions are more important than words, as shown at sacrificial ceremonies where no chanter needs to be present. In Ahkazah spiritual government, the village leader does not need to know chants. This represents the lack of inclination towards written word. Other barriers missionaries faced in conversion of the Ahka include lack of messianic message and lack of desire for written word. When missionaries arrived in the area, the Hmong and Karen had old traditional stories of a "lost book". Christian missionaries were able to exploit this by proclaiming themselves as "foreign brothers" bringing back their golden book. Akha culture also has similar stories of a lost book, but there is no recovery prophecy like in the Hmong and Karen and therefore no "message from the messiah". Paul Lewis claimed Akha villagers did not have the same desire for literacy as the Hmong villagers, who mainly converted because of this thirst for literacy. In Akha legends, the creator handed an Akha a book written on buffalo skin but the man got hungry and ate it on his way home. Akha culture was characterized by the contentment of the current situation [of not having a language], and the belief that Ahka culture should be rather be preserved by memory since the words were eaten.

== History of conversion ==
The earliest western missionary documented to arrive in the Akha villages in Southeast Asia appeared in 1869. This was an American Baptist pastor and missionary who arrived in Kengtung of the Shan state of Burma. Because of the conservative nature of the Akha villages, it took 40 years before the first successful group converted. The first Akha Baptist church opened up in 1936 after a huge effort by groups of missionaries. American Baptists remained in the Burmese Akha villages until the Burmese government banned them in the 1960s. Paul and Elaine Lewis were perhaps some of the most famous American Baptist missionaries and the last to evangelize in Kentung. They opened up both a middle school and a bible school for the Lahu and Akha villagers. In 1962, the first Thai villagers were converted to Christianity, over 50 years after the first Burmese concerts by an Australian couple from the Overseas Missionary Fellowship. Many missionaries moved from Burma to Thailand when the Burmese government banned them and also from China to Thailand when the Chinese government banned missionaries in 1949. The date the Catholic Church won its first converts is unclear, but documents suggest 1920s. Paul Lewis, especially, focused efforts on education, and developmental projects rather than his evangelical efforts. Starting in the 1980s, Thai missionaries and Italian priests, nuns and a Thai laywoman have resided in Akha villages to help with conversion efforts. In Burma Akha villages, the religious constituency is mostly Catholic, then Protestant and, thirdly, traditionalist. When the missionaries in Burma and Thailand converted the first Christians, the Christian Akha were not allowed to stay within their original "heathen villages, they had to move out to start their own village. The original Akhazah religion is extremely exclusive, as one cannot mix the zah and the nonzah. The mixed religion villages present in Burma and Thailand today are mixed because of growing lax village leaders that pull back on high numbers of Christian converts.

== Causes of conversion ==
In the last decade, most of the Protestant and Catholic converts from Akhaza stated lack of resources and lack of knowledge about Akhazah rules as the driving force behind conversion. Villagers had to provide rice for rituals, animal sacrifices and labor for numerous ceremonies. Akhazah also associated twins with bad luck so those with twins had to kill them and leave the village. In the past, Akha men challenged one another in Ahkazah knowledge but as Thai schools were built in Akha villages, the ideal became succeeding at school rather than Akhazah. Ahkazah is resilient to change as one is required to do zah exactly as zah was practiced in previous generations. However, because swidden agriculture is no longer feasible because of economic, political and ecological reasons the Ahka cannot grow enough corn and rice to feed the animals for zah ceremonies. The Ahka live closer to subsistence levels and spend their income on feeding families rather than on feeding animals. Akhaza is dwindling in younger generations as understanding the Thai language and culture is beneficial for economic incentive. The Akha villagers switch from a traditional zah to a Christian zah more often than to a Buddhist Zah despite the missionary monks sent by the Department of Public Welfare of the Ministry of the Interior in Thailand. These Thammacarik Buddhist monks opened a school for male youths in Chiang Mai, a large city in Thailand. Akha monks fully utilized this school by becoming novices and monks but reverted to old religions as they left the monastery. Many suggest that the Ahka convert to Christianity at much larger numbers than Buddhism to remain their autonomy from the mainstream Thai, who are almost entirely Buddhist. Some scholars claim Christianity also allows them to maintain their language, dress and culture. They become Ahka Christian rather than Christian. In the current Ahka villages, few Ahka Christians interact with non Ahka Christians. The Ahka Protestants and Ahka Catholics, however, maintain a close bond. Another reason for recent converts is for opium addicts to seek out refugee from drug temptation in a Christian Ahka Village. Christianity in Ahka Villages are not a mixed religion, they gave up spiritual beliefs of Ahkazah when they converted to Christianity.

== Tourism ==
70% of tourism to Northern Thailand is to see the hill tribes and the conversion of hill tribes to Christianity has discouraged tourists as they lose parts of their traditional culture. Tourists are stunned by the villages that center around a church as this does not fit in their perception of the hill tribe people. However, even with the influx of Christianity they maintain certain traditions such as Akha wear, dancing, herbal medicinal beliefs and language.

== Ahka Churches in Thailand Association ==
The Ahka Churches in the Thailand Association is an association consisting of 49 villages, 565 families and 5850 people. It aims to fund for pastors for each village, at 18,000 baht a year they are unaffordable for the villagers themselves. The ACT was formed in 1956 by a Christian Burmese Priest named Sala Yaju. With donations from Europe, the Americas, and Christian Ahkas, a tribal center was established in Chiang Rai in 1989 where educational trainings are held in the local Ahka language to educate village church leaders and children. Children are fed and housed and village leaders are expected to share knowledge about biblical matters back in their village.
