= Religion in Thailand =

Religion in Thailand (2021 estimate)
1. Buddhism (Note: Including Thai, Chinese and Peranakan indigenous religions.) (92.5%)
2. Islam (5.40%)
3. Christianity (1.20%)
4. Other / None (0.90%)

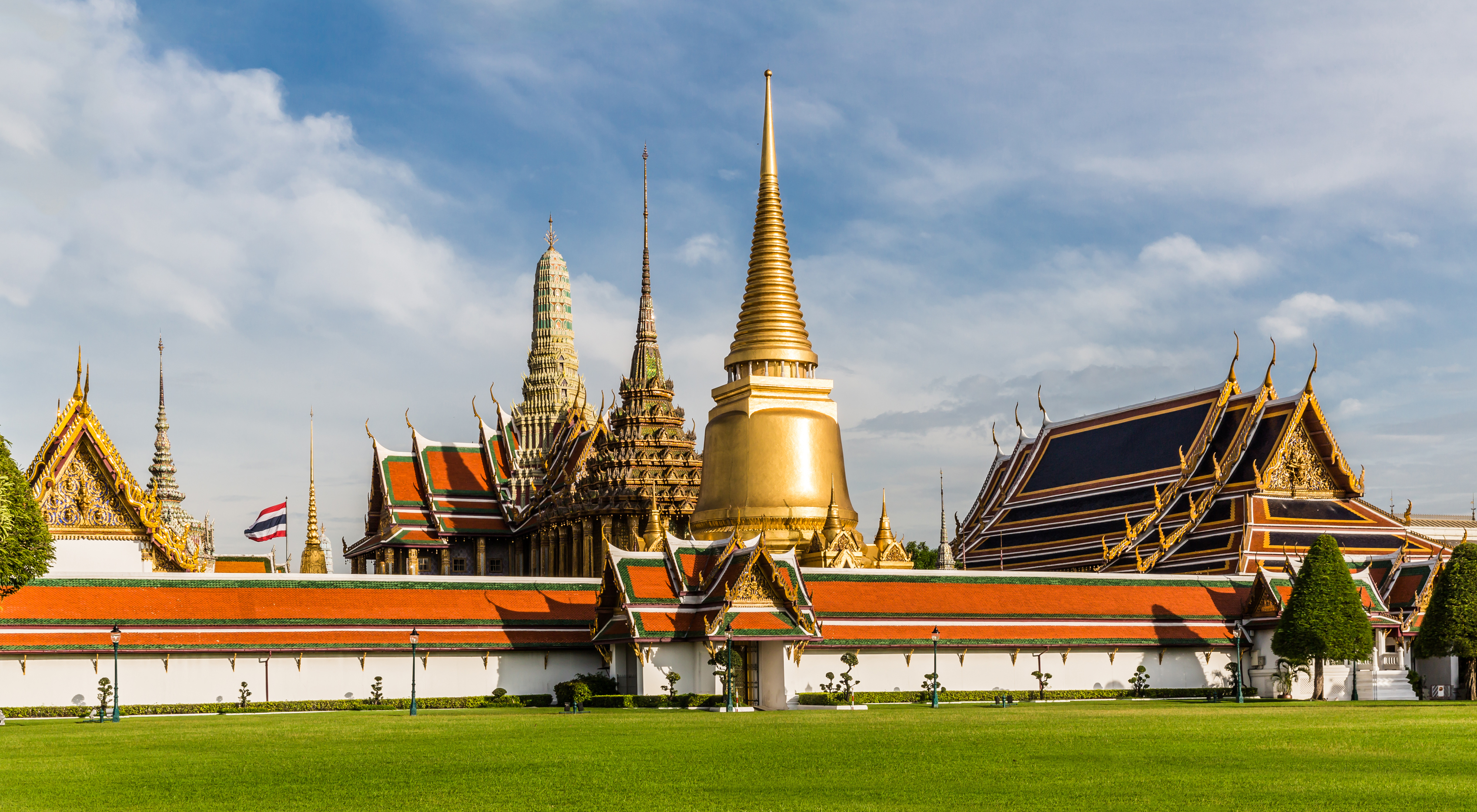
Wat Phra Kaew, the most sacred Theravada Buddhist temple in Bangkok

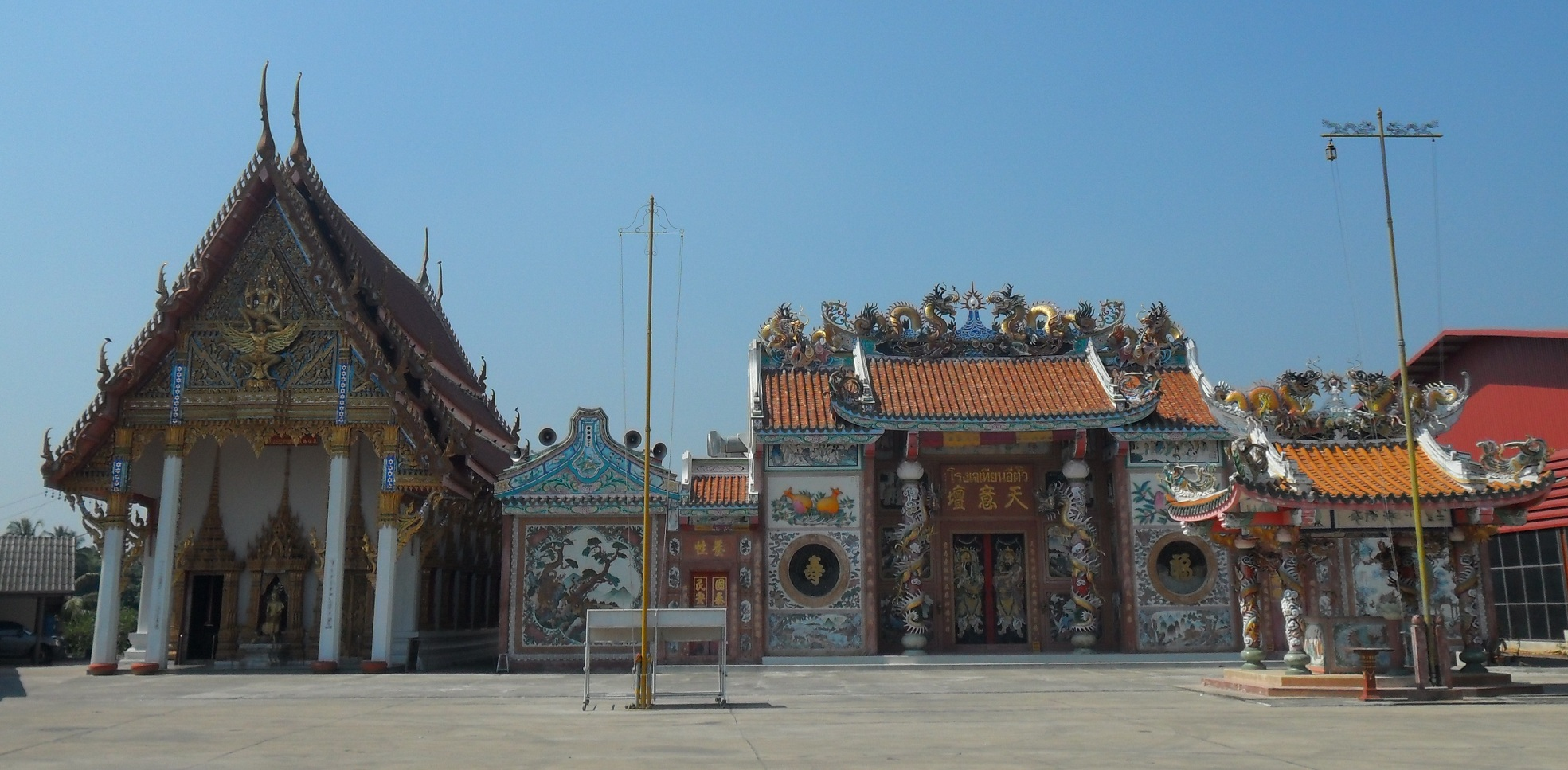
A Thai Theravada Buddhist temple (left) and a Chinese folk religion temple (right), side by side, showing the Thai and Chinese religious heritage of the country

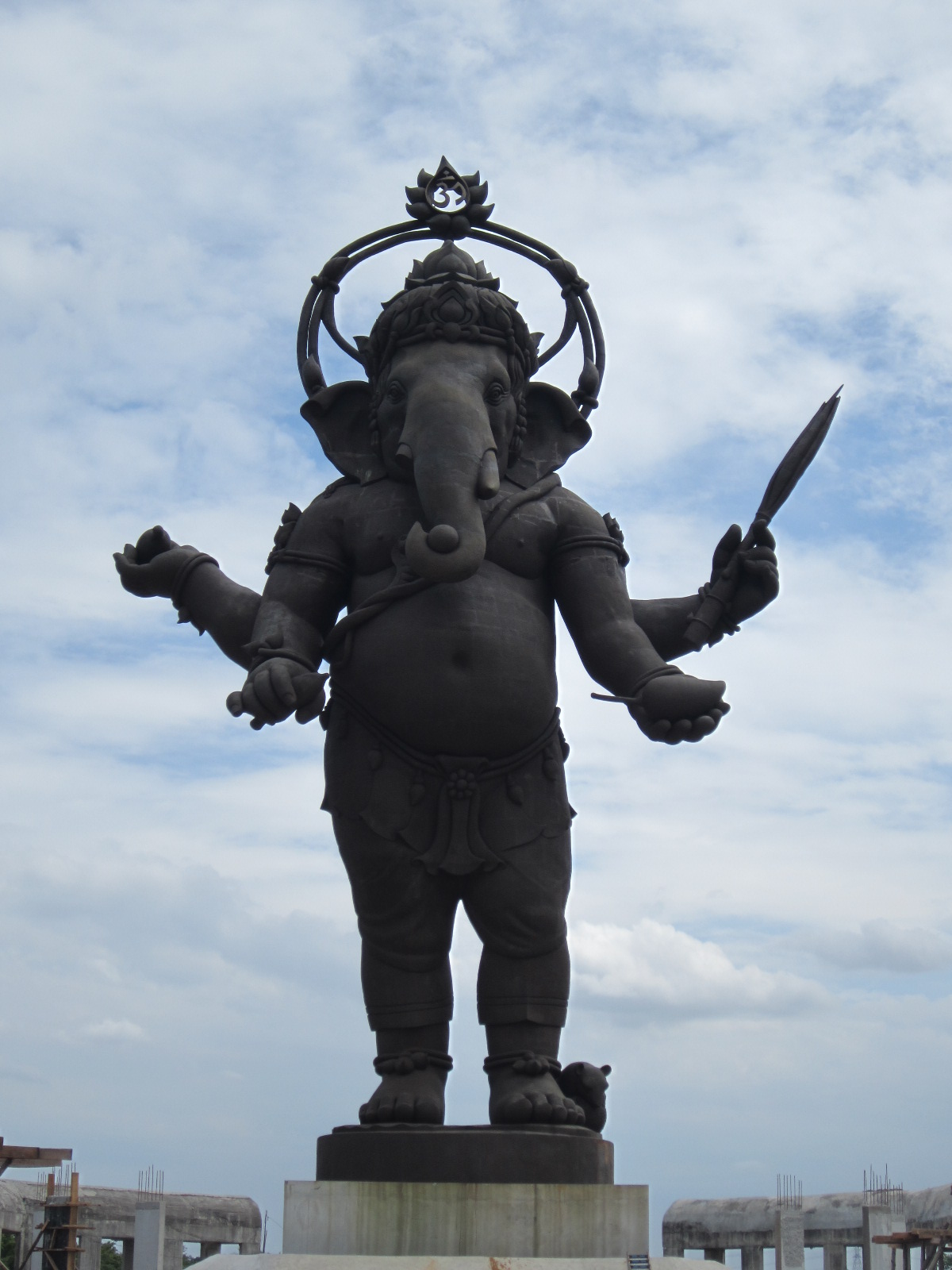
World's tallest bronze Ganesha statue at the Khlong Khuean Ganesh International Park in Khlong Khuean

Buddhism is the predominant religion in Thailand. It is practised by more than 90% of the total population and is deeply influenced by Hinduism, with most Siamese Thai people revering major Hindu deities in their day to day religious practices. The Thai Constitution does not indicate any state religion, but promotes Buddhism, while guaranteeing religious freedom for all Thai citizens. Ramakien (the Thai version of Ramayana) is recognised as the country's national epic.

Many other people, especially among the Isan ethnic group, practise Tai folk religions. A significant minority Muslim population, mostly constituted by Thai Malays, is present especially in the southern regions. According to an Ipsos survey, Christians might be a similarly significant religious minority population (4%). It's also reported that 1% prefer not to say and another 1% has no religion. Thai law officially recognizes five religions: Buddhism, Islam, Christianity, Hinduism, and Sikhism.

== Demographics ==
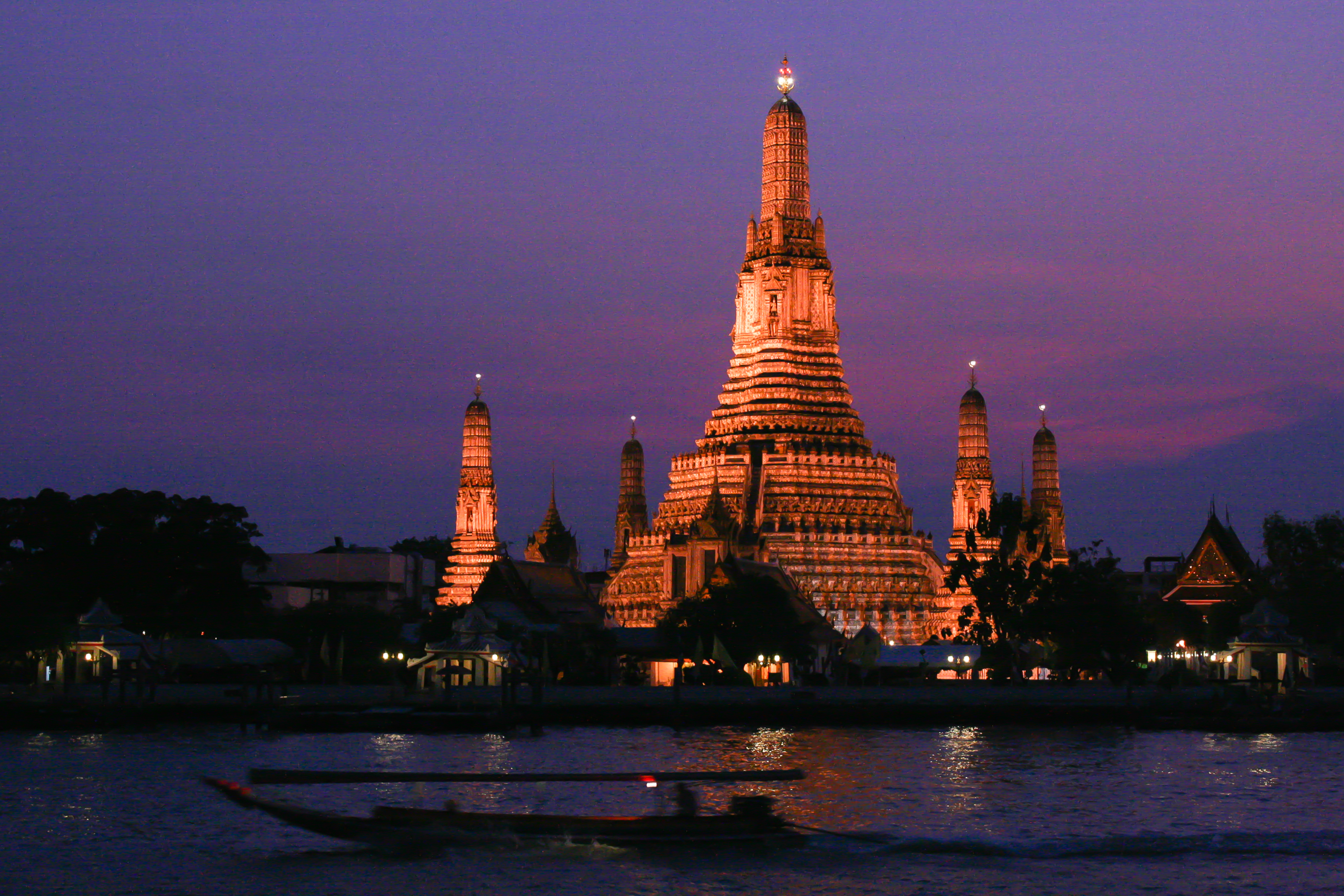
Wat Arun, a Theravada Buddhist temple, at twilight

According to official census data from 2018, approximately 94% of Thais follow Buddhism. On the other hand, non-census data from 2023 has put the figure at 90% of Thais being Buddhist. The religious life of the country is more complex than how it is portrayed by such statistics. Of the large Thai Chinese population, the vast majority of those who follow Buddhism have been shifted into the dominant Theravada tradition, with only a small minority having retained Chinese Buddhism. Otherwise, a large part of the Thai Chinese have retained the practice of ethnic Chinese religion, including Taoism, Confucianism and Chinese salvationist religions (such as Yiguandao and the Church of Virtue). Despite being practised freely, these religions have no official recognition, and their followers are counted as Theravada Buddhists in statistical studies. Also, many Thai and Isan practise their ethnic Tai folk religion.

Muslims are the second largest religious group in Thailand at 4% to 5% of the population. Thailand's southernmost provinces - Pattani, Yala, Narathiwat, Satun, Trang, and part of Songkhla - have large Muslim populations, consisting of both ethnic Thai and Malay.

Christians, mainly Catholics, represent about 4% of the population as of 2023.

A small but influential community of Sikhs and some Hindus, mostly live in the country's cities and are engaged in retail commerce.

There is also a small Jewish community in Thailand, dating back to the 17th century.

According to the 2015 Gallup International survey, Thailand was the most religious country of the 65 countries polled, with 94% of Thais identifying as religious.

== Censuses ==
=== Overview ===
Religion	Census 2010		Pilot Census 2015		Pilot Census 2018	
Religion	Population	%	Population	%	Population	%
Buddhism	61,746,429	93.58%	63,620,298	94.50%	63,299,192	93.46%
Islam	3,259,340	4.94%	2,892,311	4.29%	3,639,233	5.37%
Christianity	789,376	1.20%	787,589	1.17%	767,624	1.13%
Hinduism	41,808	0.06%	22,110	0.03%	12,195	0.018%
Sikhism	11,124	0.02%	716	0.001%	12,195	0.018%
Confucianism	16,718	0.02%	1,030	0.001%	2,009	0.002%
Other religions	70,742	0.11%	1,583	0.002%	2,009	0.002%
Not religious	46,122	0.07%	2,925	0.005%	2,082	0.003%
Unknown	3,820	0.005%			4,085	0.006%
Total	65,981,660	100%	67,228,562	100%	67,726,419	100%

=== Religions by region ===
According to the 2015 pilot census, 67,328,562 Thailand residents in the different regions of the country belonged to the following religious groups:

Religion	Bangkok		Central Region		Northern Region		Northeastern Region		Southern Region	
Religion	#	%	#	%	#	%	#	%	#	%
Buddhism	8,197,188	93.95%	18,771,520	97.57%	11,044,018	96.23%	18,698,599	99.83%	6,908,973	75.45%
Islam	364,855	4.18%	247,430	1.29%	35,561	0.31%	16,851	0.09%	2,227,613	24.33%
Christianity	146,592	1.68%	214,444	1.11%	393,969	3.43%	13,825	0.07%	18,759	0.21%
Hinduism	16,306	0.19%	5,280	0.03%	207	0.002%	318	0.001%		
Sikhism					378	0.003%			491	0.005%
Other religions			294	0.00%	1,808	0.16%			359	0.004%
Not religious	289	0.00%	473	0.002%	1,001	0.01%	436	0.002%	72	0.008%

=== Religions by province ===
According to the 2010 census, Thailand residents in the different provinces of the country belonged to the following religious groups:

Religion	Buddhism		Islam		Christianity		Hinduism		Confucianism		Sikhism		Other religions		Not religious		Unknown		Total
Religion	#	%	#	%	#	%	#	%	#	%	#	%	#	%	#	%	#	%	Total
Bangkok	7,686,022	92.54%	382,385	4.60%	157,534	1.89%	22,820	0.27%	6,800	0.08%	7,183	0.08%	24,330	0.29%	17,091	0.20%	1,053	0.01%	8,305,218
Amnat Charoen	281,675	99.28%	267	0.09%	1,649	0.58%	59	0.02%	13	0.01%	13	0.01%	53	0.02%	–	–	–	–	283,729
Ang Thong	249,847	98.25%	3,994	1.57%	213	0.08%	172	0.07%	7	0.01%	7	0.01%	42	0.01%	9	0.01%	–	–	254,292
Bueng Kan	360,468	99.37%	242	0.07%	1,913	0.53%	96	0.03%	21	0.01%	12	0.01%	–	–	3	0.01%	–	–	362,754
Buriram	1,261,658	98.96%	1,911	0.15%	7,508	0.59%	745	0.06%	278	0.02%	131	0.01%	1,746	0.14%	911	0.07%	25	0.01%	1,274,912
Chachoengsao	663,790	92.76%	46,041	6.43%	4,457	0.62%	231	0.03%	43	0.01%	55	0.01%	626	0.09%	360	0.05%	–	–	715,603
Chai Nat	304,407	99.61%	592	0.19%	424	0.14%	35	0.01%	23	0.01%	18	0.01%	47	0.02%	41	0.01%	–	–	305,587
Chaiyaphum	961,401	99.74%	944	0.10%	1,185	0.12%	227	0.02%	59	0.01%	57	0.01%	9	0.01%	16	0.01%	9	0.01%	963,907
Chanthaburi	475,653	97.95%	1,937	0.40%	5,922	1.22%	129	0.03%	65	0.01%	40	0.01%	1,016	0.21%	849	0.17%	–	–	485,611
Chiang Mai	1,592,164	91.66%	6,789	0.39%	133,761	7.70%	790	0.05%	365	0.02%	189	0.01%	546	0.03%	2,420	0.14%	17	0.01%	1,737,041
Chiang Rai	1,065,169	90.81%	3,167	0.27%	103,450	8.82%	478	0.04%	212	0.02%	52	0.01%	139	0.01%	245	0.02%	15	0.01%	1,172,928
Chonburi	1,463,280	94.08%	23,269	1.50%	56,878	3.66%	1,155	0.07%	610	0.04%	426	0.03%	6,139	0.39%	3,601	0.23%	–	–	1,555,358
Chumphon	462,822	98.94%	3,545	0.76%	1,040	0.22%	115	0.02%	88	0.02%	11	0.01%	79	0.01%	101	0.02%	–	–	467,801
Kalasin	821,714	99.66%	1,058	0.13%	1,348	0.16%	72	0.01%	30	0.01%	33	0.01%	203	0.02%	76	0.01%	–	–	824,534
Kamphaeng Phet	790,017	99.08%	1,571	0.20%	3,775	0.47%	226	0.03%	124	0.01%	94	0.01%	746	0.09%	838	0.11%	–	–	797,391
Kanchanaburi	789,692	98.52%	2,849	0.35%	7,833	0.97%	203	0.02%	204	0.02%	20	0.01%	145	0.01%	573	0.07%	–	–	801,519
Khon Kaen	1,731,964	99.43%	2,593	0.15%	6,251	0.36%	517	0.03%	232	0.01%	370	0.02%	39	0.01%	2	0.01%	2	0.01%	1,741,969
Krabi	235,594	65.04%	125,476	34.64%	517	0.14%	120	0.03%	59	0.01%	34	0.01%	305	0.08%	93	0.02%	5	0.01%	362,203
Lampang	729,866	98.21%	1,422	0.19%	10,730	1.44%	68	0.01%	108	0.01%	37	0.01%	665	0.08%	243	0.03%	3	0.01%	743,143
Lamphun	410,259	99.40%	631	0.15%	1,698	0.41%	30	0.01%	12	0.01%	16	0.01%	96	0.02%	–	–	–	–	412,741
Loei	543,592	99.55%	544	0.10%	1,778	0.33%	–	–	12	0.01%	17	0.01%	73	0.01%	16	0.01%	–	–	546,031
Lopburi	765,821	99.47%	1,525	0.20%	1,304	0.17%	141	0.02%	55	0.01%	51	0.01%	294	0.04%	733	0.10%	–	–	769,925
Mae Hong Son
Maha Sarakham
Mukdahan
Nakhon Nayok
Nakhon Pathom	928,954	98.42%	2,162	0.23%	9,803	1.04%	444	0.05%	108	0.01%	38	0.01%	1,574	0.17%	810	0.09%	–	–	943,892
Nakhon Phanom
Nakhon Ratchasima
Nakhon Sawan
Nakhon Si Thammarat	1,353,244	93.30%	94,914	6.54%	1,323	0.09%	250	0.02%	167	0.01%	29	0.01%	538	0.03%	–	–	–	–	1,450,466
Nan	444,201	98.10%	329	0.07%	8,071	1.78%	27	0.01%	10	0.01%	19	0.01%	156	0.03%	–	–	–	–	452,814
Narathiwat	93,968	14.02%	575,585	85.90%	212	0.03%	44	0.01%	161	0.02%	30	0.01%	2	0.01%	–	–	–	–	670,002
Nong Bua Lamphu	484,770	99.75%	448	0.09%	650	0.13%	57	0.01%	13	0.01%	19	0.01%	–	–	17	0.01%	–	–	485,974
Nong Khai	817,218	99.48%	575	0.07%	3,416	0.42%	214	0.03%	61	0.01%	32	0.01%	–	–	10	0.01%	–	–	821,526
Nonthaburi	1,282,703	96.14%	41,816	3.13%	7,760	0.59%	656	0.05%	373	0.01%	89	0.01%	172	0.01%	473	0.03%	40	0.01%	1,334,083
Pathum Thani	1,271,785	95.83%	35,867	2.70%	9,807	0.74%	1,367	0.10%	706	0.05%	99	0.01%	6,592	0.50%	845	0.06%	78	0.01%	1,327,147
Pattani	94,507	15.52%	513,841	84.37%	221	0.04%	77	0.01%	58	0.01%	49	0.01%	237	0.39%	23	0.01%	3	0.01%	609,015
Phang Nga	200,324	77.48%	57,081	22.08%	786	0.30%	98	0.04%	23	0.01%	46	0.01%	2	0.01%	174	0.07%	–	–	258,534
Phatthalung	423,199	87.99%	56,282	11.70%	973	0.20%	79	0.02%	109	0.02%	24	0.01%	248	0.05%	58	0.01%	3	0.01%	480,976
Phayao	412,121	98.74%	487	0.12%	4,275	1.02%	35	0.01%	19	0.01%	14	0.01%	103	0.02%	321	0.07%	4	0.01%	417,380
Phetchabun	929,722	98.90%	2,774	0.30%	5,818	0.62%	392	0.04%	499	0.05%	57	0.01%	407	0.04%	400	0.04%	7	0.01%	940,076
Phetchaburi	460,327	97.41%	10,398	2.20%	1,411	0.30%	61	0.01%	52	0.01%	5	0.01%	128	0.03%	206	0.04%	–	–	472,589
Phichit
Phitsanulok
Phra Nakhon Si Ayutthaya	827,251	95.01%	37,056	4.26%	3,024	0.35%	330	0.04%	78	0.01%	44	0.01%	458	0.05%	57	0.01%	2,373	0.27%	870,671
Phrae	423,310	99.04%	551	0.13%	3,118	0.73%	45	0.01%	52	0.01%	35	0.01%	184	0.04%	101	0.02%	2	0.01%	427,398
Phuket	418,025	79.52%	83,969	15.97%	19,058	3.63%	1,011	0.19%	67	0.01%	104	0.02%	930	0.18%	2,453	0.47%	91	0.02%	525,709
Prachinburi
Prachuap Khiri Khan
Ranong
Ratchaburi	781,901	98.14%	2,802	0.35%	10,108	1.27%	411	0.05%	205	0.03%	90	0.01%	474	0.06%	757	0.10%	–	–	796,748
Rayong
Roi Et
Sa Kaeo	553,526	99.56%	721	0.13%	1,393	0.25%	90	0.01%	31	0.01%	14	0.01%	54	0.01%	132	0.02%	–	–	555,961
Sakon Nakhon
Samut Prakan
Samut Prakan
Samut Songkhram
Saraburi
Satun	89,715	32.64%	184,552	67.14%	403	0.15%	17	0.01%	152	0.06%	16	0.01%	–	–	8	0.01%	–	–	274,863
Sing Buri	197,857	98.94%	891	0.45%	1,149	0.57%	50	0.03%	3	0.01%	7	0.01%	–	–	23	0.01%	2	0.01%	199,982
Sisaket	1,047,650	99.21%	1,677	0.16%	5,818	0.55%	196	0.02%	30	0.01%	41	0.01%	312	0.03%	255	0.02%	–	–	1,055,979
Songkhla	1,102,830	74.46%	374,728	25.30%	2,635	0.18%	218	0.01%	214	0.01%	37	0.01%	271	0.01%	88	0.01%	–	–	1,481,021
Sukhothai
Suphan Buri
Surat Thani	978,368	96.93%	22,521	2.23%	2,313	0.23%	460	0.05%	238	0.02%	42	0.01%	2,469	0.24%	2,940	0.29%	–	–	1,009,351
Surin
Tak
Trang	511,698	85.44%	85,609	14.29%	1,216	0.20%	74	0.01%	13	0.01%	26	0.01%	200	0.03%	40	0.01%	–	–	598,877
Trat
Ubon Ratchathani
Udon Thani
Uthai Thani
Uttaradit
Yala	100,778	23.27%	331,747	76.59%	453	0.10%	69	0.02%	61	0.01%	40	0.01%	–	–	16	0.01%	3	0.01%	433,167
Yasothon	482,651	98.91%	453	0.09%	4,689	0.96%	140	0.03%	28	0.01%	15	0.01%	–	–	–	–	–	–	487,976
Total	61,746,429	100%	3,259,340	100%	789,376	100%	41,808	100%	16,718	100%	11,124	100%	66,922	100%	46,122	100%	3,820	100%	65,981,660

== Buddhism ==
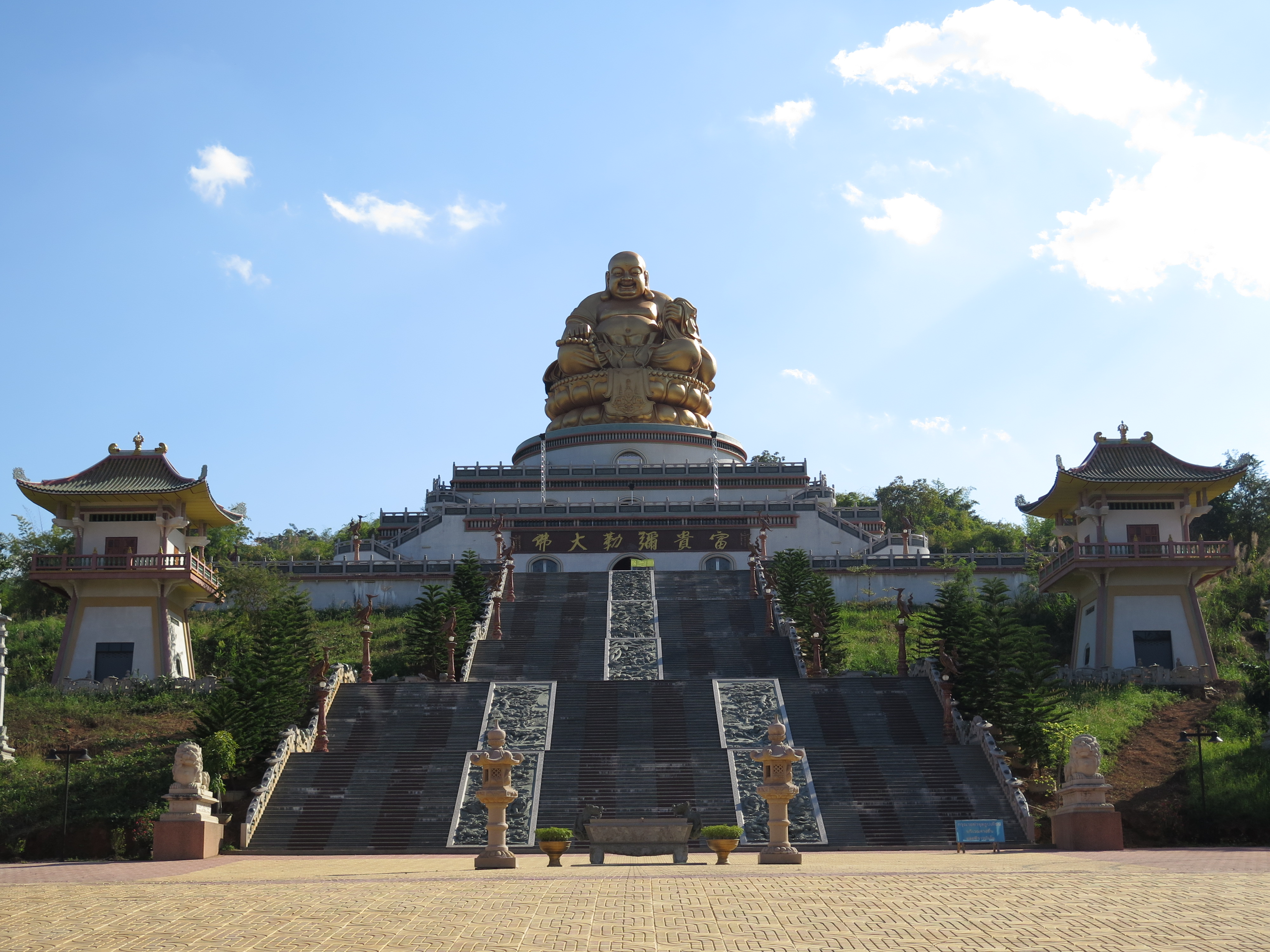
Chinese Maitreya temple in rural Chiang Rai Province

Buddhism in Thailand is largely of the Theravada school. Over 90% of Thailand's population adheres to this school.

Thai Buddhism is practised alongside various indigenous religions, such as Chinese indigenous religion by the many Thais of Chinese origin, Hinduism among Thai of Indian origin and Siamese Thai people, Thai folk religion among Northeastern Thai, Northern Thai and Northern Khmer people, and Peranakan folk religion for Peranakans.

Buddhist temples in Thailand are characterised by tall golden stupas, and the Buddhist architecture of Thailand is similar to that in other Southeast Asian countries, especially Cambodia and Laos, which share a cultural and historical heritage with Thailand.

== Abrahamic religions ==
=== Islam ===
Bang Luang Mosque, one of the oldest mosques in Bangkok

Islam resided in Thailand as early as the 9th century, It is primarily practiced by the Thai Malays were concentrated in the southern Thailand. According to the 2015 census, Thailand has 2,892,311 Muslims, or 4.29% of the total population. 2,227,613 of these Muslims are concentrated in the southern region of the country, where they represent up to 24.33% of the population.

A vast majority of the country's are found in Thailand's four provinces, that are Satun, Yala, Pattani and Narathiwat, they make up majority of the population.

=== Christianity ===
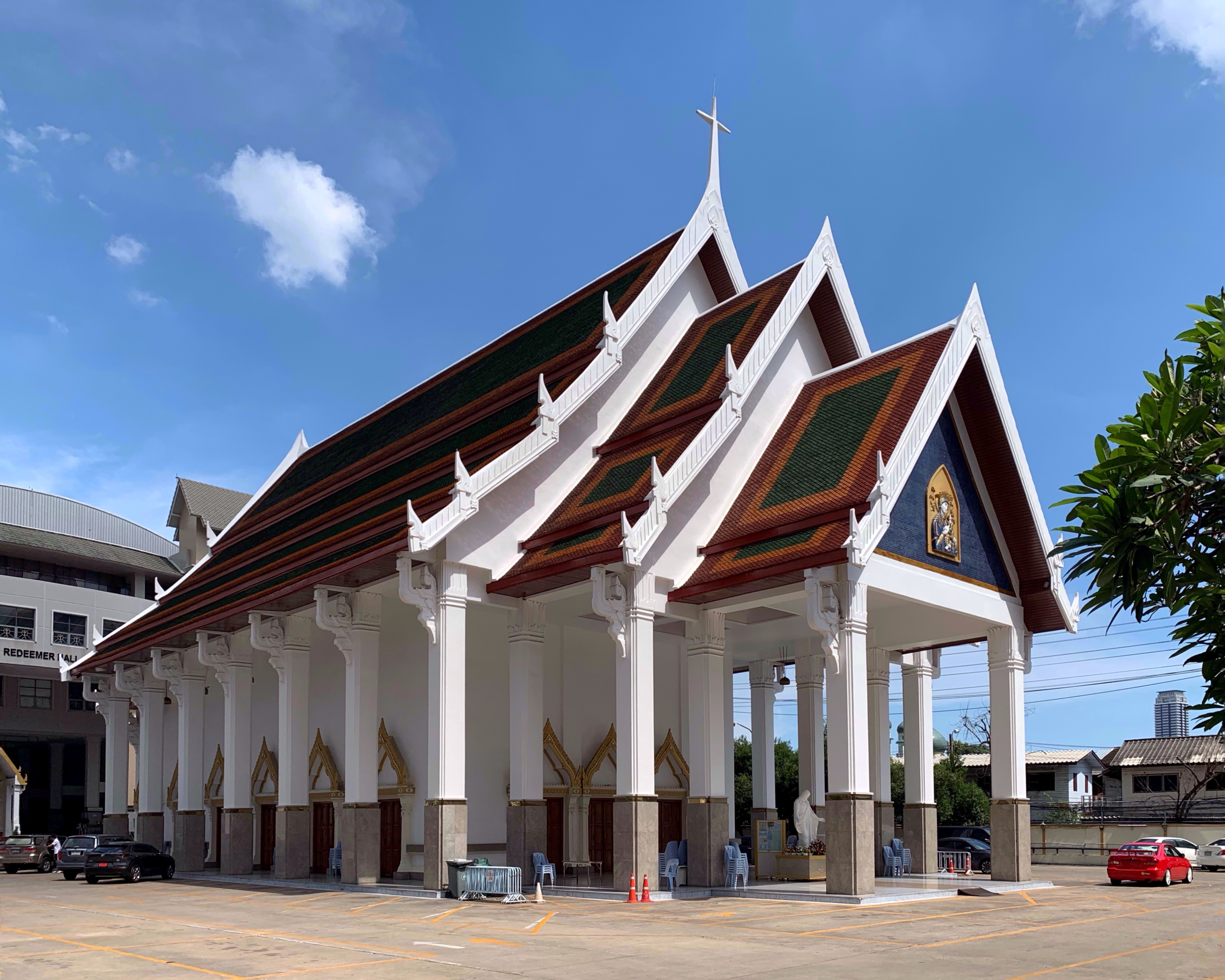
Holy Redeemer Church in Bangkok, built in Thai architecture

Christianity was introduced by European missionaries as early as the 1550s, when Portuguese mercenaries and their chaplain arrived in Ayutthaya. Historically, it has played a significant role in the modernisation of Thailand, notably in social and educational institutions. As of 2015 just over one percent of the population of Thailand are Christians. Of that group, 400,000 are estimated to be Catholics.

Thailand's Department of Religion, currently under the Ministry of Culture, has formally recognised five major Christian churches/denominations: the Catholic Church, the Southern Baptists, the Seventh-day Adventists, the Church of Christ in Thailand, and the Evangelical Fellowship of Thailand. Although not officially recognised, missionaries of the Church of Jesus Christ of Latter-day Saints (Mormons) have been active in Thailand for decades, though their converts are comparatively few. Also present are Jehovah's Witnesses, with over 5,200 members and 140 congregations.

=== Judaism ===
Judaism in Thailand dates back to the 17th century, with the arrival of a few Baghdadi Jewish families. The present community consists of both Ashkenazi (for instance the expatriate community plus some descendants of refugees from imperial Russia and later the Soviet Union), and Sephardi Jews, who were born in such places as Afghanistan, Iran and Syria, and wealthy gem traders. Most of the Jewish community in Thailand, consisting of an estimated 2,000 residents, reside in Bangkok, although there are at any given time thousands of tourists (some long-term) coming primarily from Israel. There are Jewish synagogues in Phuket, Chiang Mai, and Ko Samui, but no community there.

== Other Dharmic religions ==
=== Hinduism ===
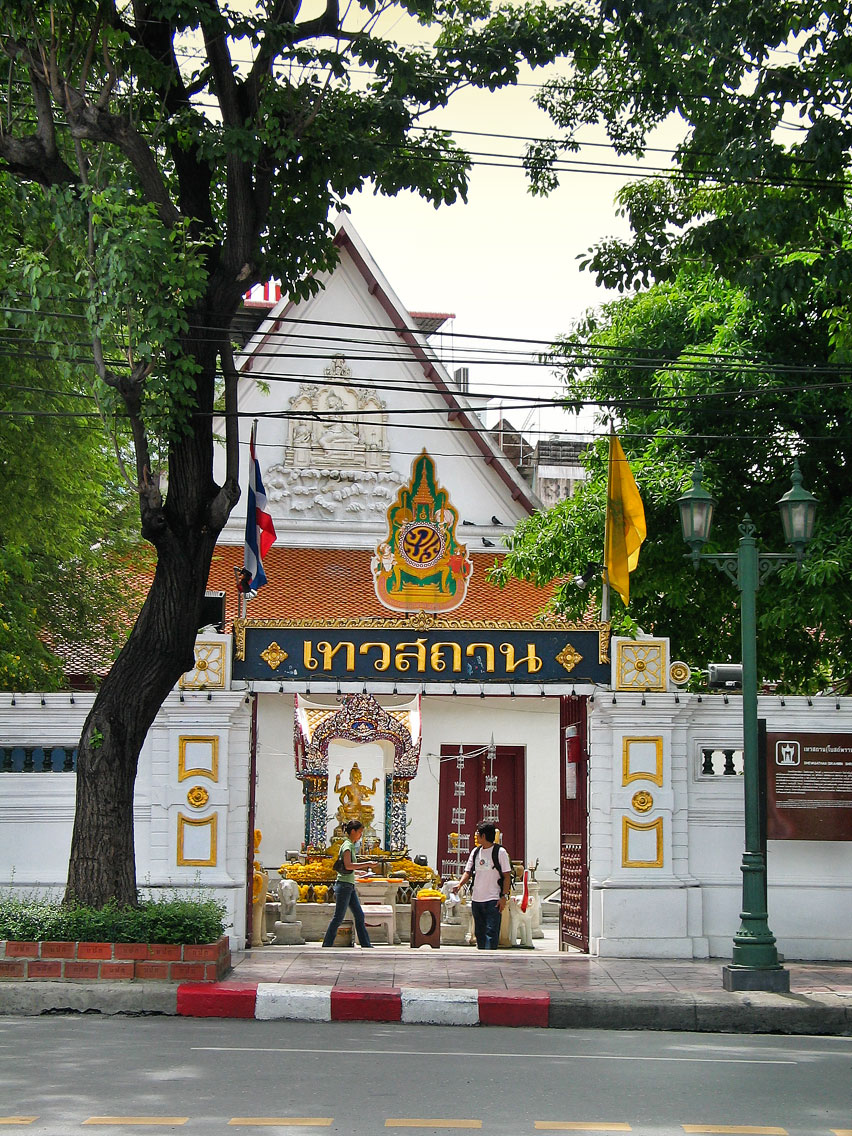
The front gate of the Devasathan, the official center of Hinduism in Bangkok

Several thousand Hindus of Indian origin live in Thailand, mainly in the larger cities. Besides this group of "traditional Hindus", Thailand in its earliest days was under the rule of the Khmer Empire, which had strong Hindu roots, and the influence among Thais remains even today. There are also some ethnic Cham Hindus living in Thailand. The popular Ramakien epic based on Buddhist Dasaratha Jataka is very similar to the Hindu Ramayana. The former capital of Ayutthaya was named for Ayodhya, the Indian birthplace of the Rama, the protagonist of the story. There is a class of brahmins who perform rituals for Hindu gods. Brahmin rituals are still common. Hindu-Buddhist deities are worshipped by many Thais and statues and shrines of Brahma, Ganesh, Indra, Shiva, Vishnu, Lakshmi and other Hindu-Buddhist gods are a common sight (for example the Erawan Shrine area). Another relic of Hinduism is Garuda, now a symbol of the monarchy.

=== Sikhism ===
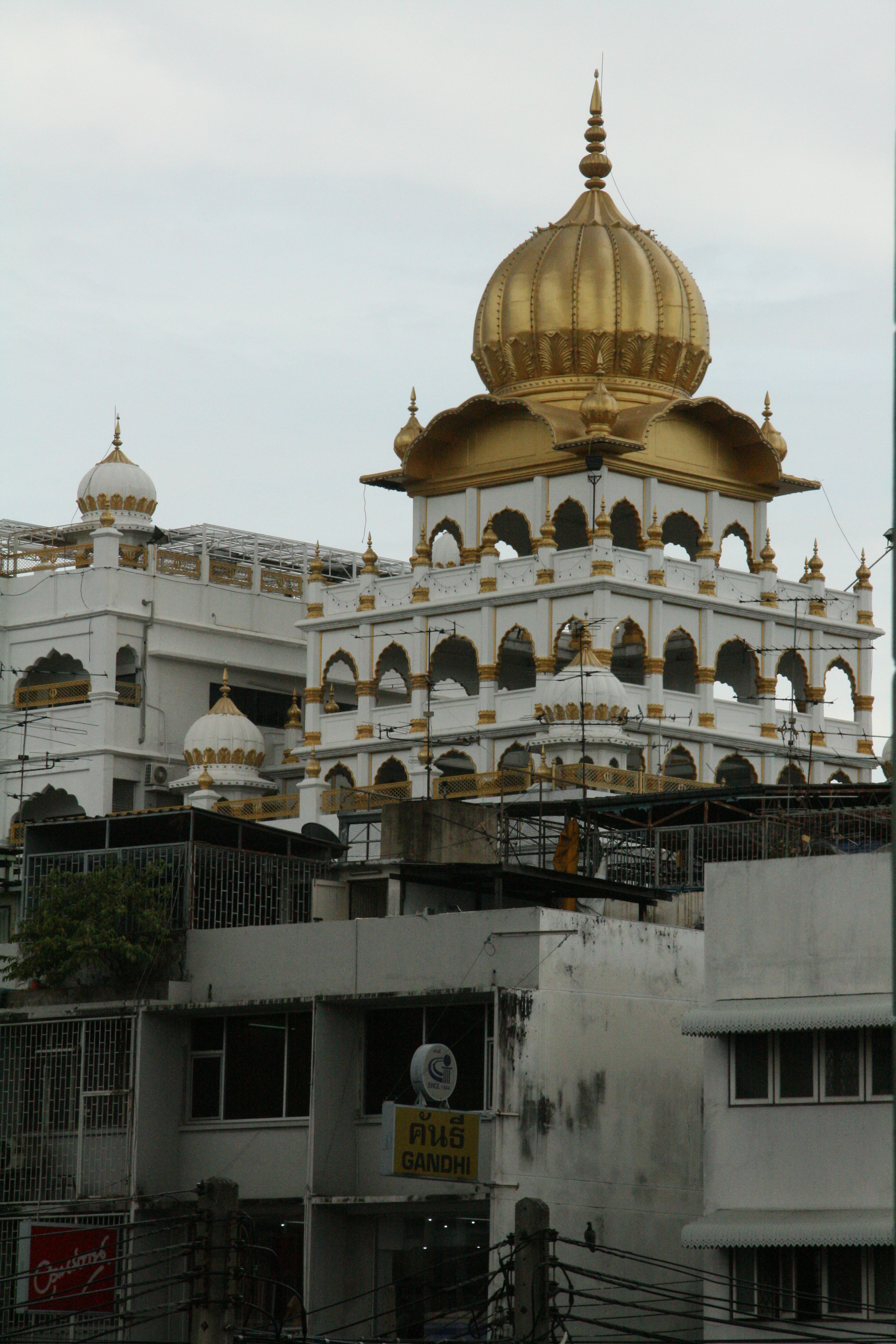
Gurudwara Siri Guru Singh Sabha in Bangkok

The first Sikh known to have come to Thailand was Ladha Singh, who arrived in 1890. Other Sikhs joined him in the early 1900s, and by 1911 more than a hundred Sikh families had settled in Thailand, mainly in Thonburi Region. There were at that time no gurdwaras (Sikh temples), and religious prayers were held in private homes every Sunday and on gurpurab days. The Sikh community continued to grow, and in 1912 it was decided to build a gurdwara. It stands today in Bangkok's Pahurat area and imitates the Golden Temple in Amritsar Punjab, India. A tiny but influential community of Sikhs live in the country's cities, most engaged in retail commerce.

== Folk religions ==
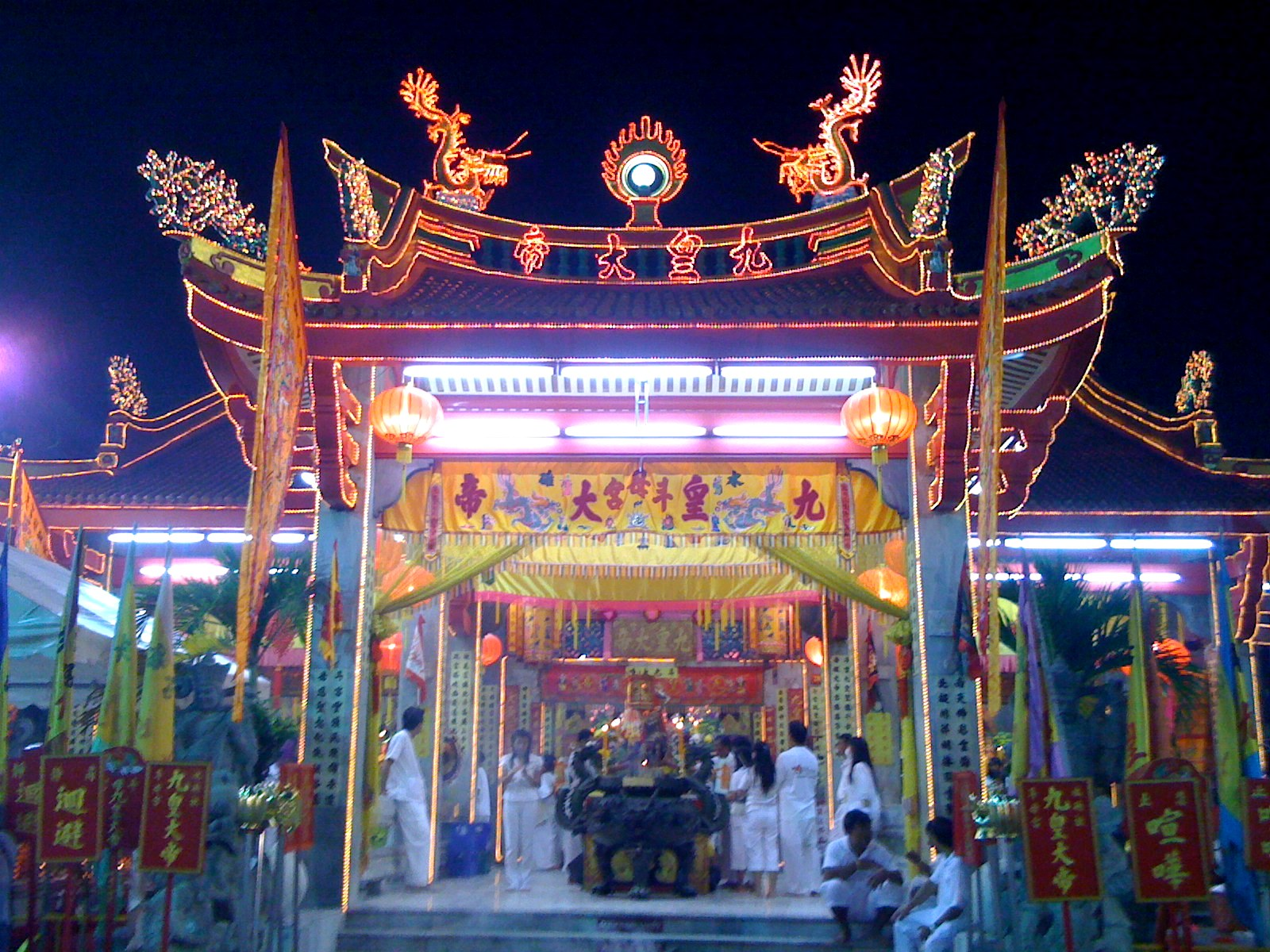
Jui Tui Shrine in Phuket at night

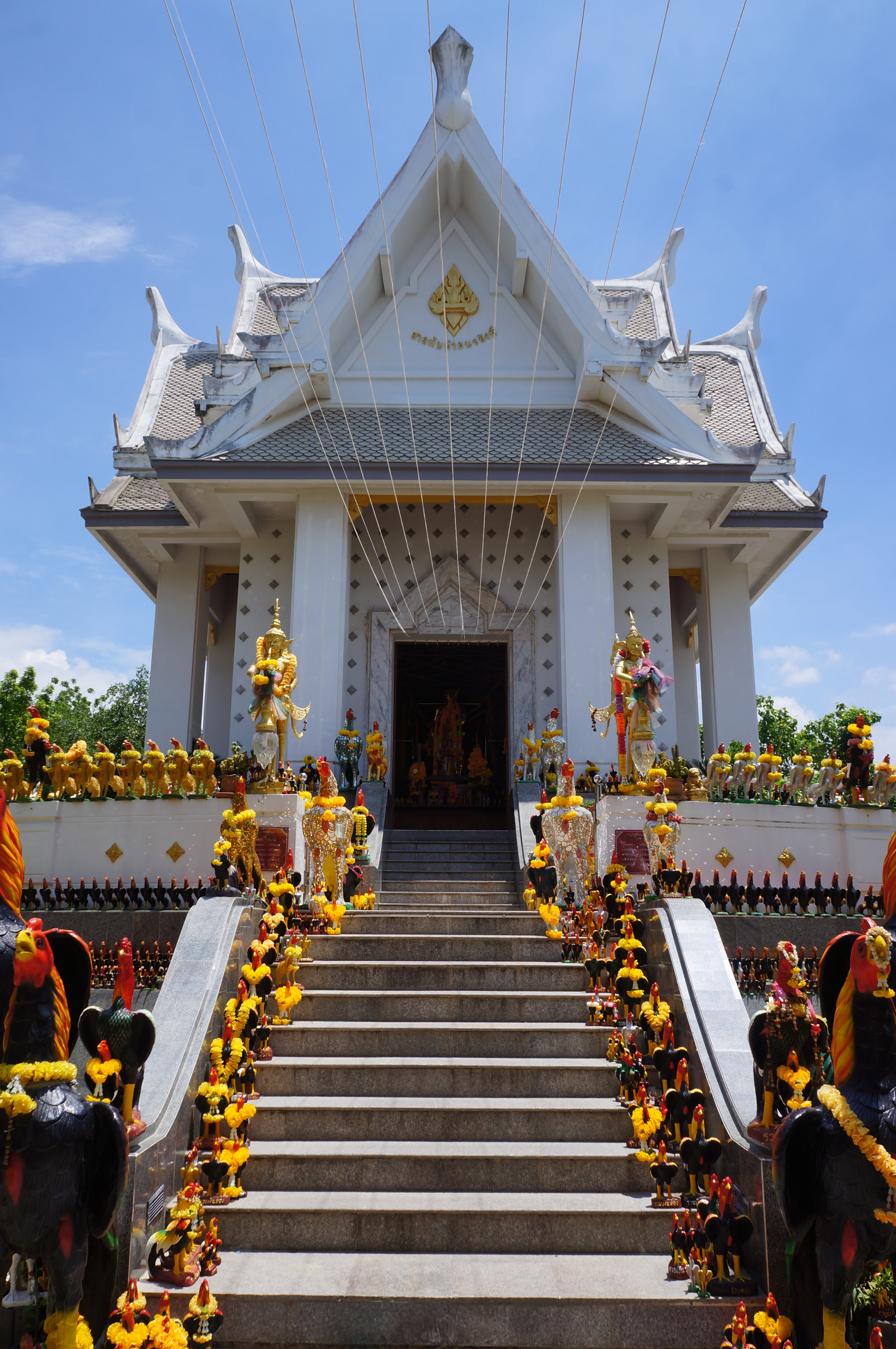
San Phanthai Norasing, a shrine to a local deity associated with the rooster in Mueang Samut Sakhon, Samut Sakhon Province

=== Chinese folk religion ===
Many within the large Thai Chinese population (excluding the Peranakans) practise various Chinese religions, including the worship of local gods, Chinese ancestral worship, Taoism, Confucianism and Chinese salvationist religions. One of the latter, Yiguandao (Thai: Anuttharatham), spread to Thailand since the 1970s, and it has grown so popular to come into conflict with Buddhism; in 2009 there were more than 7,000 Yiguandao churches in the country and approximately 200.000 people convert each year into the religion. Despite the large number of followers and temples these religions have no state recognition, their temples are not counted as places of worship, and their followers are counted as "Theravada Buddhists" in officially released religious figures. Chinese temples are called sanchao in Thai language.

The Chinese folk religion of Thailand has developed local features, including the worship of local gods. Major Chinese festivals such as Nian, Zhongqiu, and Qingming, are widely celebrated, especially in Bangkok, Chonburi, and other parts of Thailand where there are large Chinese populations. Thai of Teochew and Hoklo origin generally worship Guanyin and Mazu, while Cantonese origin worship Guan Yu.

=== Peranakan folk religion ===
The Peranakans in the city of Phuket practise a nine-day vegetarian festival between September and October. During the festive season, devotees will abstain from meat and mortification of the flesh by Chinese mediums is also commonly seen. The rites and rituals are devoted to the veneration of Tua Pek Kong. Such traditions were developed during the 19th century in Phuket by the local Chinese with influences from Malay and Southern Thai culture.

=== Thai folk religion ===
Most of Northeastern Thai (as well as Northern Thai, Northern Khmer and some Siamese Thai) practise distinctive indigenous religions characterised by worship of local gods and ancestors. They are very similar to the Chinese folk religion.

== Freedom of religion ==
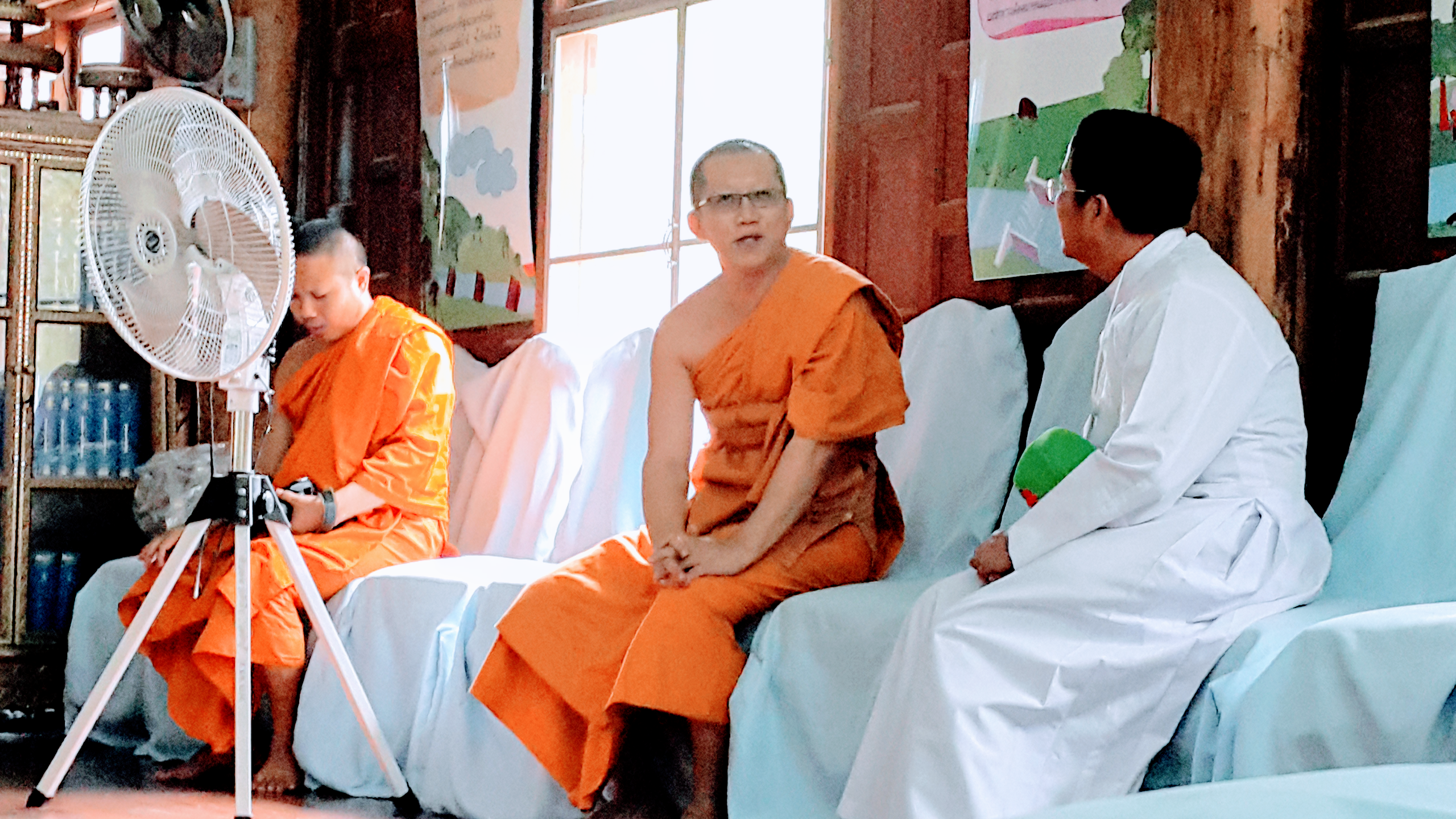
A Buddhist monk talking to a Catholic priest in a temple in Kanchanaburi

The constitution “prohibits discrimination based on religious belief," and allows all persons to practise any religion of their choice. Religious groups can operate freely with or without government registration.

The government has a quota for the number of foreign missionaries working in the country: 1,357 Christian, six Muslim, 20 Hindu, and 41 Sikh. Benefits include longer visa stays.

In 2022, violence against religious groups was reported in the Deep South; however it is difficult to separate this from ethnic violence. Due to this violence, in 2023, Freedom House scored the country 3 out of 4 for religious freedom.

== See also ==
- Religion in Myanmar
- Religion in China
- Religion in Laos
- Religion in Vietnam
- Jainism in Southeast Asia
