= Bangkok Christian Hospital =

Bangkok Christian Hospital โรงพยาบาลกรุงเทพคริสเตียน

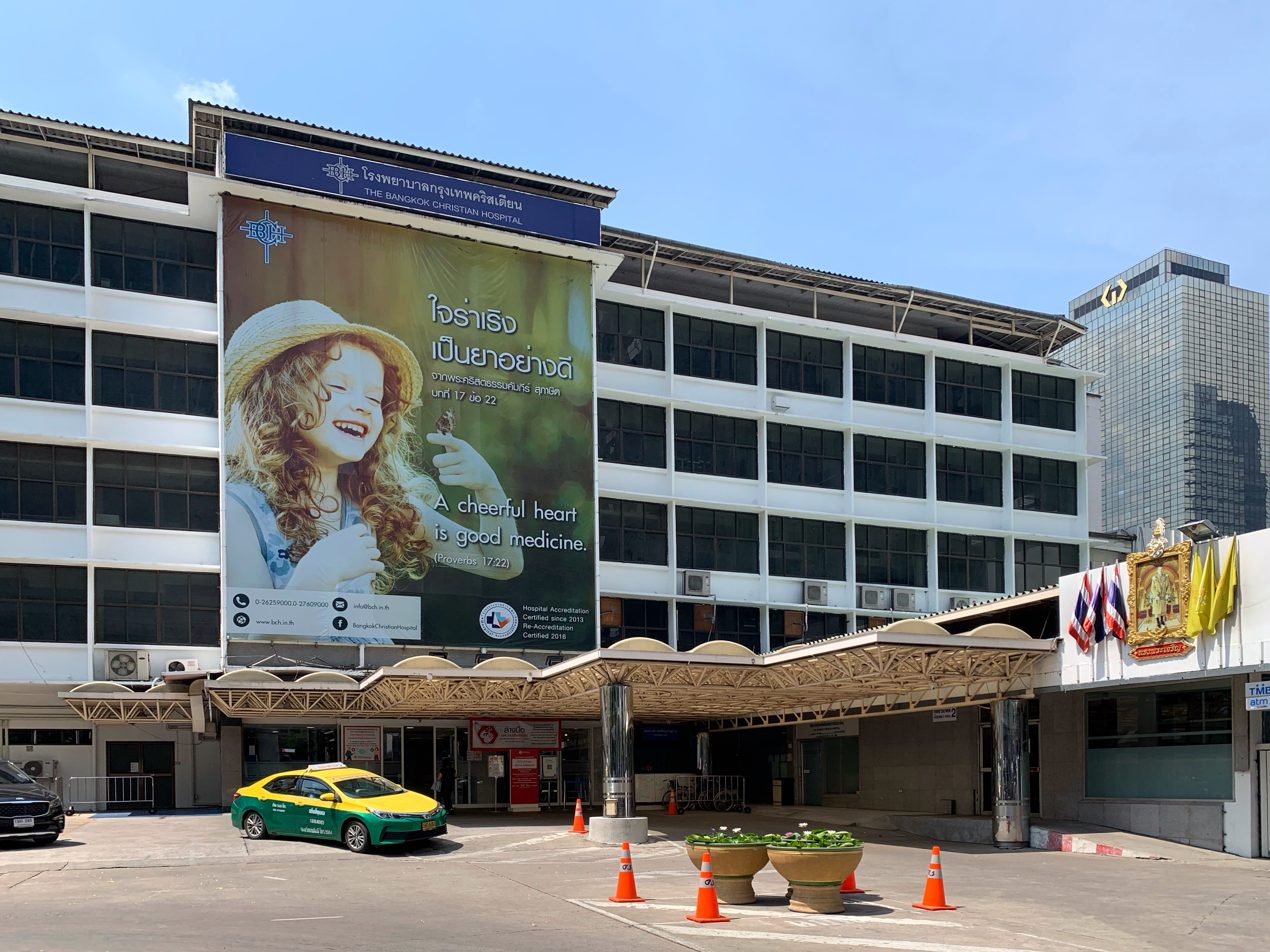
- Main entrance of Bangkok Christian Hospital

Geography
- Location: 124 Silom Road, Bang Rak, Bangkok, Thailand
- Coordinates: 13°43′42″N 100°31′52″E

Organisation
- Care system: Private hospital
- Type: General
- Affiliated university: None

Services
- Emergency department: Yes

Helipads
- Helipad: No

History
- Founded: December 3, 1949

Links
- Website: www.bch.in.th
- Lists: Hospitals in Thailand

The Bangkok Christian Hospital (Thai: โรงพยาบาลกรุงเทพคริสเตียน) is one of the oldest general hospitals in Bangkok, Thailand. Situated on Silom Road, Bang Rak District.

== History ==
The first Christian missionaries arriving in Thailand in the 19th century often combined preaching with medical help for the local population. They considered medical healing as part of their mission, as Jesus had commanded them to "Heal the Sick".

In 1840 the Presbyterian Mission was established in Bangkok and expanded its offices over the country for evangelism together with the healing mission. Initially, clinics were set up which gradually developed into better equipped hospitals.

After the Second World War, the American Presbyterian Mission and the Church of Christ in Thailand purchased a land between Silom Road and Surawong Road with several wooden buildings. After renovation, the buildings were officially inaugurated as the Bangkok Christian Hospital in 1949.

A new Outpatient Department of the hospital was opened in 1957 with dentistry, laboratory, and pharmacy facilities along with a chapel. A few years later, an operating building (1961) and the Inpatient Department (1965) was added.

In the 1970s, an office building in honour of the "Church of Christ in Thailand", was constructed on Surawong Road, and the 13-storey "Mo Bradley Building", named after the pioneer missionary and doctor Dr. Dan Beach Bradley in Thailand, was completed in 1981. The 17-storey "Mo Welles Building" was completed in 2006, named after the first director of the hospital, Marshall Phillip Welles. It received hospital accreditation since 2013.

== Mission ==
At present The Bangkok Christian Hospital has special centers (International Refractive Center, Skin care & laser Center, Health Screening Center, Dental Care Center) and specialized departments (internal medicine, ophthalmology, ear, nose and throat, obstetrics and gynecology, pediatrics, orthopedics, surgery, radiology, anesthesiology).

Besides medical care it provides pastoral care with its same name division.

The hospital is considered to be good and much cheaper than other similar quality hospitals by the expatriate community in Thailand.
