= Indians in Thailand =

ชาวอินเดียในประเทศไทย ไทยเชื้อสายอินเดีย
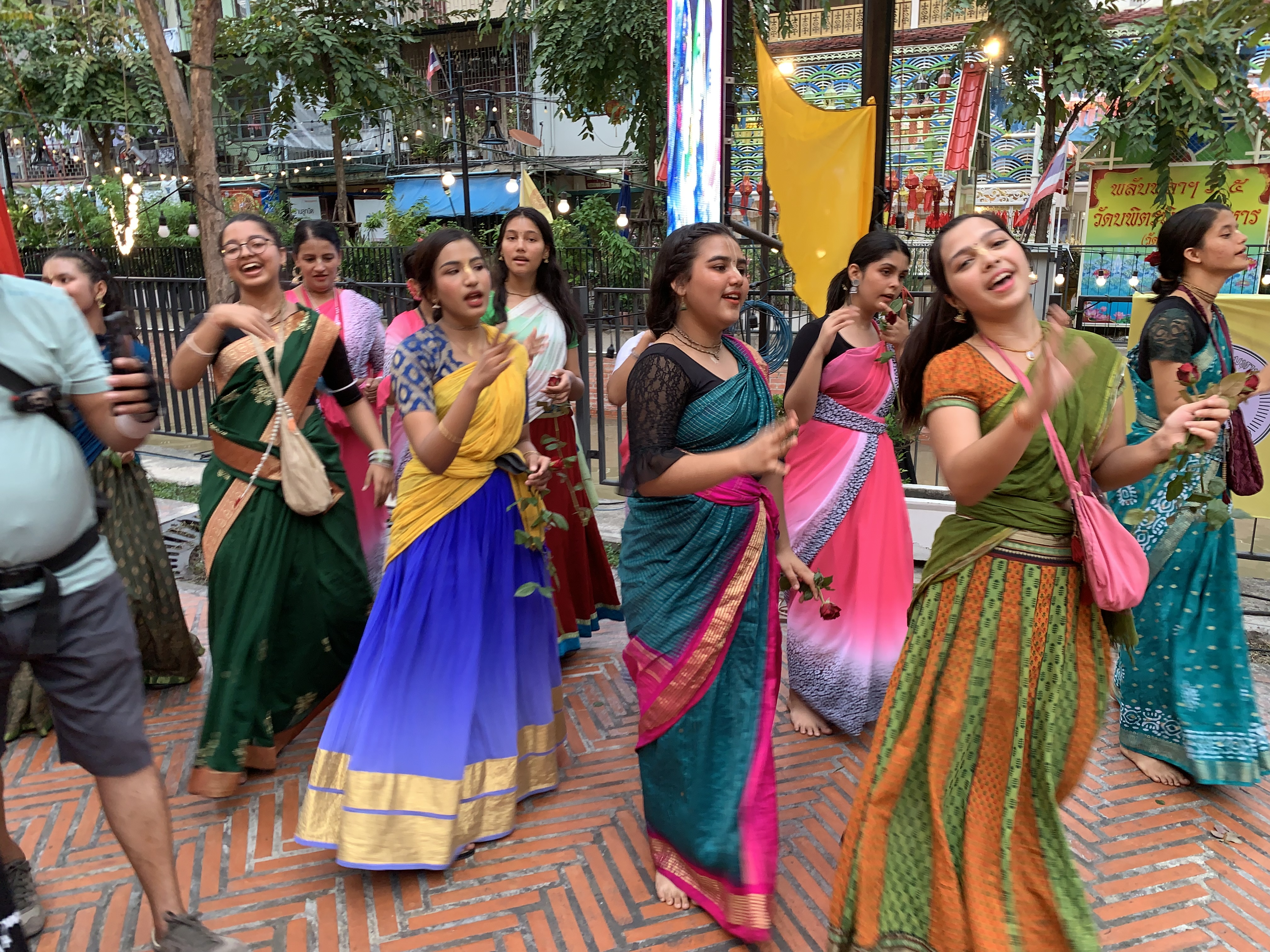
- Indian diaspora dressed in sari dancing at Dipavali Bangkok 2022

Total population
- People with Indian origins 150,000-200,000; Citizens of India; 25,000

Regions with significant populations
- Bangkok · Pattaya · Chiang Mai · Phuket

Languages
- Thai · Telugu · Tamil • English · Gujarati · Marathi · Urdu · Punjabi

Religion
- Hinduism · Christianity · Buddhism · Sikhism · Islam

Related ethnic groups
- Indians (diaspora) · Thais

Indians in Thailand, often referred to as Thai Indians, are citizens of Thailand with full or partial Indian ancestry. They are a part of the Indian diaspora.

An opinion poll in 2010 stated that 37% of Thai people had positive views about India, contrasted with 37% of Thai people having negative views about India.

== History ==
The Mariamman Temple, Bangkok is the first modern temple built in the South Indian architectural style. It was built in 1879 by Vaithi Padayatchi, a Tamil Hindu immigrant.

== British East India Company ==
Some Thai Muslims, especially in the Southern part of Thailand, have Indian ancestry. A notable number of Sikhs established a small area in Bangkok called Phahurat which grew into a strong town rivaling Chinatown, who tend to have jobs in business rather than as professionals due to their cultural values.

The historical number of the Indian population in Thailand can be seen in British consular statistics; however, these figures often lumped Indians together with Sinhalese and Malays. According to 1912 statistics, there were 30 Indians registered in the Chiengmai (Chiang Mai) consular district, 41 Indians and Malays in the Puket (Phuket) consular district, 40 Indians and Malays in the Senggora (Songkhla) consular district, and 423 Indians, Sinhalese, and Malays in the Bangkok consular district.

== Tourism ==
In 2025, India became one of Thailand's most significant tourism source markets, recording 2,487,319 arrivals and generating 93,862 million baht in tourism receipts. While total international arrivals to Thailand declined by 7.2% that year, the Indian market grew by 16.8%, ranking as the third-largest contributor to both visitor volume and overall revenue contribution.

The Tourism Authority of Thailand granted a 30-day visa-exemption status for Indian citizens between 10 November 2023 and 10 May 2024. Discussions are ongoing as to a long term mutual visa-free status for citizens of India and Thailand respectively, joining Myanmar and soon Sri Lanka.

India became one of the largest inbound markets for tourism in 2019, and by 2021 it had supplanted China as the largest source of tourism to Thailand.

The Tourism Authority of Thailand has heavily promoted Thailand as a tourism destination in India, and has offered all Indian citizens visa-on-arrival and even periods of visa free entry. The country is viewed as having "rich culture, stunning beaches, glittering temples, adventure sports, mesmerizing nature, and buzzing nightlife". Several destinations such as Phuket have been trying to attract more Indian tourists.

Oyo Hotels has a large presence in the country and wider region (South East Asia was the first foray outside India for the company). It attained one million guests within three months soon after opening. A notable number of entertainment establishments in Thailand are owned by Indians, including clubs, bars, ladyboy entertainment, accommodation, gay bars and restaurants.

== Notable people ==
- Gaggan Anand, chef
- Lek Nana, businessman and politician
- Praveenar Singh - Miss Universe Thailand 2025
- Ammar Siamwalla
- Nishita Shah, businesswoman
- Chalida Vijitvongthong, actress and model

== See also ==
- India–Thailand relations
- Demographics of Thailand
- Religion in Thailand
- Phahurat
- Thais in India
  - Hinduism in Southeast Asia
  - Sikhism in Thailand
- Nepalis in Thailand
- Pakistanis in Thailand
- Mariamman Temple, Bangkok

== Sources ==
- Kesavapany, K; Mani, A; Ramasamy, P (2008). Rising India and Indian Communities in East Asia. Institute of Southeast Asian Studies. ISBN 978-981-230-799-6.
- Manguin, Pierre-Yves; Mani, A.; Wade, Geoff (2011). Early Interactions Between South and Southeast Asia: Reflections on Cross-cultural Exchange. Institute of Southeast Asian Studies. ISBN 978-981-4345-10-1.
- Sandhu, K S; Mani, A (2006). Indian Communities in Southeast Asia. Institute of Southeast Asian Studies. ISBN 978-981-230-418-6.
