= Kathavarayan =

Kathavarayan may refer to:

- Kathavarayan (deity), a Hindu folk and village deity in Thanjavur, Tamil Nadu, India
- Kathavarayan (1958 film), a 1958 Indian Tamil-language film by T. R. Ramanna
- Kathavarayan (2008 film), a 2008 Indian Tamil-language film
- Kathavarayan Rajodorai (died 2010), one of the perpetrators of the Banting murders in Malaysia

== See also ==
- Rajadhi Raja Raja Kulothunga Raja Marthanda Raja Gambeera Kathavaraya Krishna Kamarajan, 1993 Indian film by Balu Anand
