= Thais in India =

Thais in India คนไทยในอินเดีย
- (Thailand) (India)

Total population
- 7,000+

Regions with significant populations
- Panjim; Mumbai; Hyderabad; Bengaluru; New Delhi; Ahmedabad; Visakhapatnam; Kolkata; Jaipur; Chennai

Languages
- Thai; English; Indian languages

Religion
- Theravada Buddhism

Related ethnic groups
- Thai people

There is a community of Thais in India consisting mostly of international students and expatriates from Thailand and people born in India with Thai ancestry.

== Distribution ==
There are currently about 60 Thais living and working in Goa, mostly in Panjim and Margao. Most of them work as spa therapists, beauty salon specialists and chefs in five star hotels such as the Taj Holiday village and Holiday Inn. There are also about 50 to 60 Thais residing in Mumbai.

== International students ==
More than 7,000 Thai students study in various International Schools, Indian Universities and colleges. Thai students prefer Indian institutions as they provide quality education at low cost. Most of these students came to India to study subjects such as humanities, medicine and engineering.

As for School education, around 2,500 Thai students get admitted to Indian boarding and international schools (IB & Cambridge curriculum) each year. The students from Thailand target mainly schools and colleges in North and South India. In North India they prefer Dehradun and New Delhi and in South India they prefer Kodaikanal & Bangalore for school. There are over 5 Thai restaurants in Bangalore. Bangalore has the largest number over 700 of Thai students studying in various schools.

== Notable people ==
- Wisoot Bunpeng -Thai Footballer

== See also ==
- India–Thailand relations
- Indians in Thailand
- India Thai Business Forum
- International Schools in India
