= Nellukkadai Mariamman Temple =

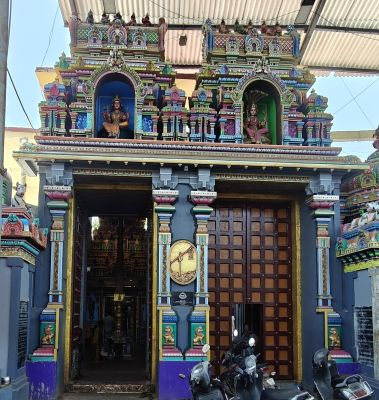

Nellukkadai Mariamman Temple is a Hindu temple located in Nagapattinam, Tamil Nadu, India.

== Location ==
It is located in Nagapattinam.

== Presiding deity ==
This temple has rajagopura and prakara. The presiding deity is known Mariamman. She has four hands. This temple is worshipped by many people. The shrines of Vinayaga, Subramania, Kathavaraya Swamy, Periyachchi, Ayyanar, and Ellaiyamman are also found in this temple. Ellaiyamman has a separate shrine with all the attendants.

== Chedil festival ==
The festival of Kathavaraya Swamy is celebrated as a chedil festival, every year. It is held during the Tamil month of Chittirai. Those who pray for begetting children, after the fulfilment of their vow, involve themselves in the chedil festival alongwith the child. During the festival, a mechanism consisting of a standing post with a long sweep at its top, on one end of which a person, under a vow, is suspended by a hook fastened into the integuments of his back and raised high in the air, is swung around. The priest of the temple will carry the child and on the chedil and will be rolled. This is an ancient and special festival in Tamil Nadu. Placing children on the chedil is an important prayer. This place is an important place of prayer.

== Administration ==
This temple is administered by the Hindu Religious and Charitable Endowments Department, Government of Tamil Nadu.
