= India–Thailand relations =

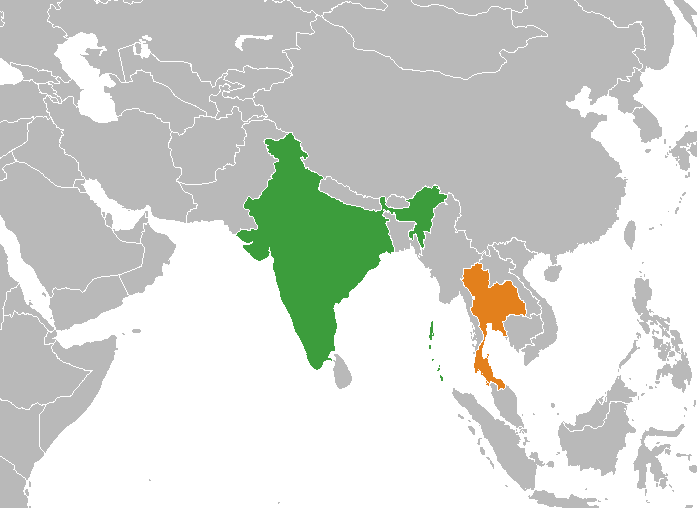
- India: Thailand

Diplomatic mission
- Embassy of India, Bangkok: Royal Thai Embassy, New Delhi

Envoy
- Ambassdor Nagesh Singh: Ambassdor Chavanart Thangsumphant

India–Thailand relations, also known as the Indo–Thai relations, are the bilateral relations between the Republic of India and the Kingdom of Thailand. Relations were established in 1947, soon after India gained independence. Priests have provided a cultural link between the two countries since 1500 BCE. India shares a long sea border with Thailand as India's Andaman and Nicobar Islands share a maritime border with Thailand along the Andaman Sea. Since 2001, both countries have witnessed growing warmth, increasing economic and commercial links, exchange of high-level visits, and the signing of various agreements leading to a further intensification of relations. Thailand and India are cooperating in various multilateral fora like India's dialogue partnership with ASEAN, the ASEAN Regional Forum (ARF), and the East Asia Summit, the sub-regional grouping BIMSTEC involving Bangladesh, India, Sri Lanka, Thailand, Myanmar, Nepal and Bhutan, and trilateral transport linkages with Thailand, Myanmar and India. India is a member of the Asia Cooperation Dialogue (ACD) initiated by Thailand in 2002 and of the Mekong–Ganga Cooperation (MGC), a group of six countries.

The Thai embassy in India is located in New Delhi, with three consulates in Mumbai, Kolkata, and Chennai. India holds its embassy in Bangkok and one consulate in Chiang Mai.

Moreover, India and Thailand have been culturally linked for centuries, with India deeply influencing Thai culture. Thai borrows a substantial number of words from Sanskrit, India's classical language. Pali, which was the language of Magadha and is the medium of Theravada, is another important root of Thai vocabulary. Buddhism, the major religion of Thailand, itself originates from India. The Hindu story of Ramayana is also well known throughout Thailand in the name Ramakien. The kings of Thailand are referred to as King Rama, the hero of Ramayana. The ancient city of Ayutthaya in Thailand is named after the city of Ayodhya in India, the birthplace of Rama. Songkran, the Thai New Year, is derived from Sankranti and it marks the "passage of the sun," a concept found in Indian astrological tradition.

== Antiquity of Trade relations ==
Indo-Thai trade relations go back to 500 BCE where evidence indicates presence of trade relations with south India (Etched carnelian beads) and south India (Indo -Pacific beads). Trade relations developed anew during the colonial era, when Myanmar (then Burma) was annexed into British India, creating an Indo-Thai border.

== Recent developments ==
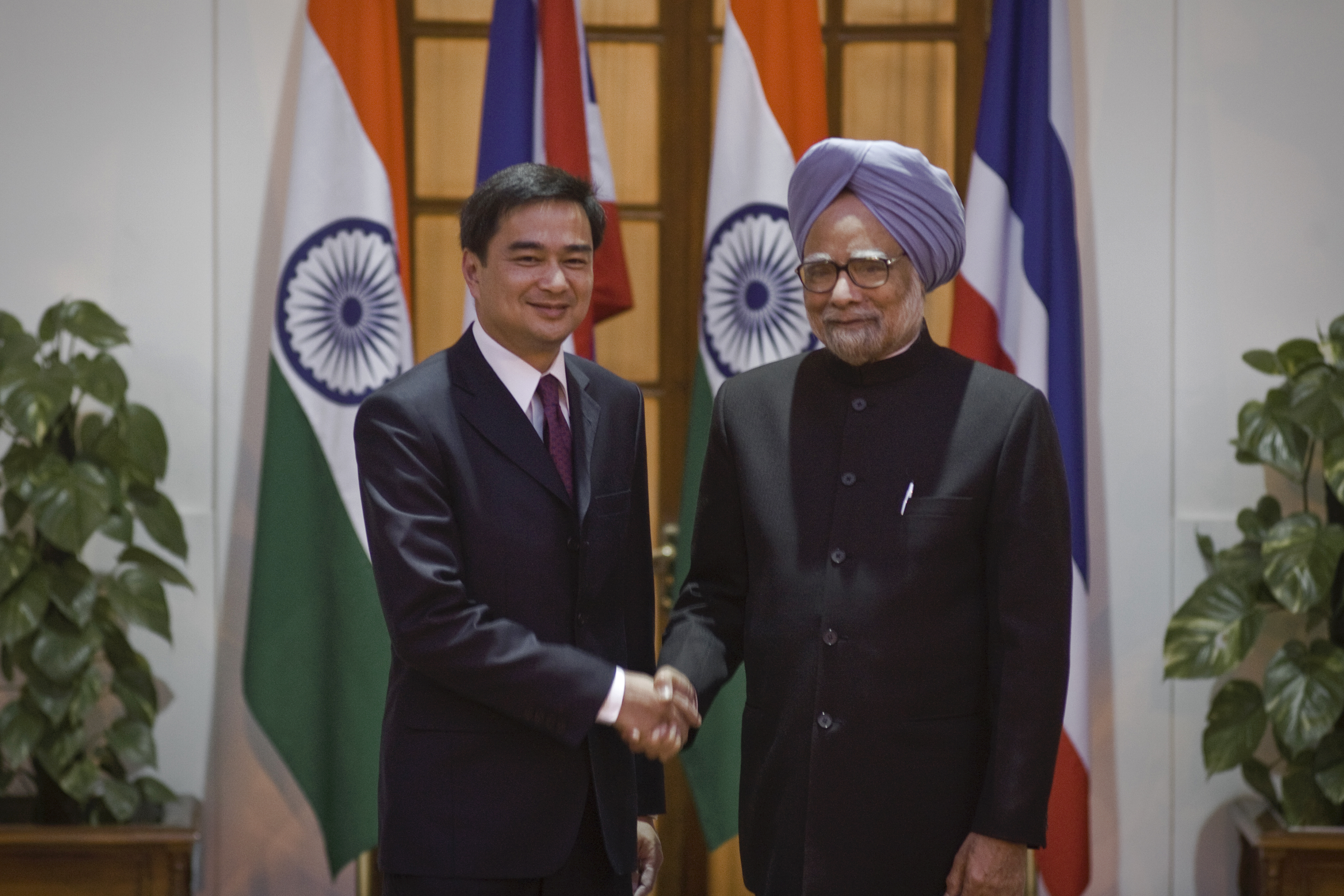
Abhisit Vejjajiva, former PM of Thailand, and Manmohan Singh, the PM of India during Abhisit's state visit to India in 2011

Abhisit Vejjajiva, the Prime Minister of Thailand, paid a state visit to India during 4–5 April 2011 at the invitation of Dr. Manmohan Singh, the former Prime Minister of India. Both leaders agreed to increase the cultural interaction, connectivity and enhancement of trade and economic through the bilateral and regional frameworks via ASEAN-India, BIMSTEC and MGC. It was also decided to increase the trade between two countries from its 2010 figure of $6.7 billion to its double in 2014.

Prime Minister Yingluck Shinawatra paid a state visit in January 2012 as a chief guest of Indian republic day. As the result of visit, there were 6 bilateral agreements signed, including treaty of transfer of sentenced person.

In a major boost to bilateral security cooperation, India and Thailand in 2013 signed an Extradition Treaty. The treaty provides the legal framework for seeking extradition of fugitive offenders, including those involved in terrorism, transnational crimes, and economic offences among others. This will help both the countries in expediting extradition of fugitives. The treaty said, it would further strengthen the relationship between two law enforcement agencies by providing a firm legal basis for their bilateral cooperation. The same year an MoU between Financial Intelligence Unit, India and Anti Money Laundering Organisation, Thailand on cooperation in the exchange of intelligence related to money Laundering and terrorism financing was also signed. The MoU will facilitate cooperation in the investigation of persons suspected of money laundering and criminal activity related to money laundering and terrorism financing. The MoU seeks to assemble, develop, analyse and exchange information on such issues. In a joint statement issued after delegation level talks, the Prime Minister, Dr. Manmohan Singh said that signing the extradition treaty and Memorandum on Cooperation in anti money laundering sends a major signal of the shared commitment of the two countries to combat terrorism, organised crime, drug trafficking and counterfeiting. Manmohan Singh said the two countries also agreed to continue strengthening defence relations including exercises and joint patrolling. The Thai Prime Minister welcomed the signing of the extradition treaty. Both the countries agreed to pursue Infrastructure development corridors on the lines of India-Myanmar-Thailand highway project. In addition, New Delhi and Bangkok agreed to take up an Indo-Thai exchange programme to enhance economic, scientific, educational, technical and cultural ties. As both leaders described, today's meaningful and productive discussions have underlined the need for speedy clearance the comprehensive and balanced Free Trade Agreement between the two countries and greater collaboration in areas like defence, security, education, space and people to people contacts. Both countries also agreed to pursue defence industry collaboration in areas of mutual interest. The leaders also welcomed the deepening of cooperation through the Joint Working Group on Security Cooperation. In total, seven pacts were signed between the two countries.

Overall the security relationship is relatively undeveloped. India has provided assistance to Thais to combat Islamic separatists in Southern Thailand in return for Thai authorities taking action against Indian separatists using Thailand as a supply route for arms originating in Cambodia. Since 2006, the Indian and Thai navies have also conducted symbolic “coordinated patrols” in the Andaman Sea. An MoU on Defence Cooperation was signed in January 2012 and an annual Defence Dialogue has been established. However, closer security cooperation may be limited by Thailand's political instability and its limited naval capabilities.

== India-Thailand maritime boundary ==
India and Thailand share the maritime boundary in the Bay of Bengal.

== Resident diplomatic missions ==
- India has an embassy in Bangkok and a consulate in Chiang Mai.
- Thailand has an embassy in New Delhi and consulates-general in Chennai, Kolkata and Mumbai.

== See also ==
- Indians in Thailand
- Thais in India
- India Thai Business Forum
- Ayutthaya Kingdom
