= Sikhism in Thailand =

Sikhism in Thailand ศาสนาซิกข์ในประเทศไทย

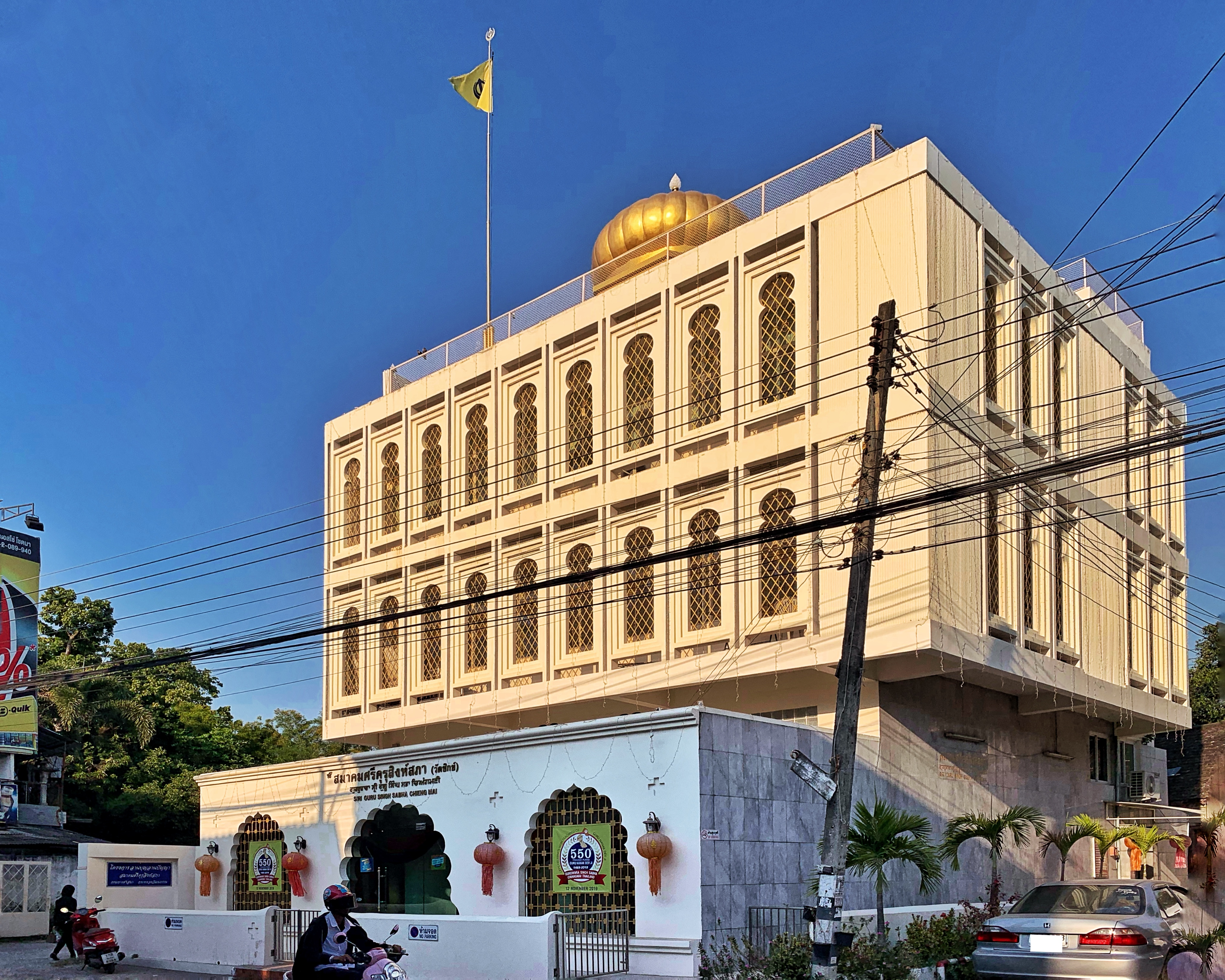
- Gurdwara of Sri Guru Singh Sabha in Chiang Mai

Total population
- ~70,000–100,000

Regions with significant populations
- Bangkok · Chiang Mai · Nakhon Ratchasima · Pattaya · Phuket · Ubon Ratchathani

Religions
- Sikhism

Languages
- Punjabi · Thai

Sikhism is a recognised minority religion in Thailand, with about 70,000–100,000 adherents. The religion was brought by migrants from India who began to arrive in the late 19th century. There are about twenty Sikh temples or Gurdwaras in the country, including the Gurdwara Sri Guru Singh Sabha in Bangkok.

== Numbers and status ==
The Sikh community was estimated in 2006 to contain around 70,000 people, most of whom resided in Bangkok, Chiang Mai, Nakhon Ratchasima, Pattaya, Phuket and Ubon Ratchathani. At that time there were nineteen Sikh temples in the country. Sikhism was one of five religious groups registered with the Religious Affairs Department of the Ministry of Culture. Sikhs in Thailand is the largest community amongst Indians and they have good relations with the King.

== Identity ==
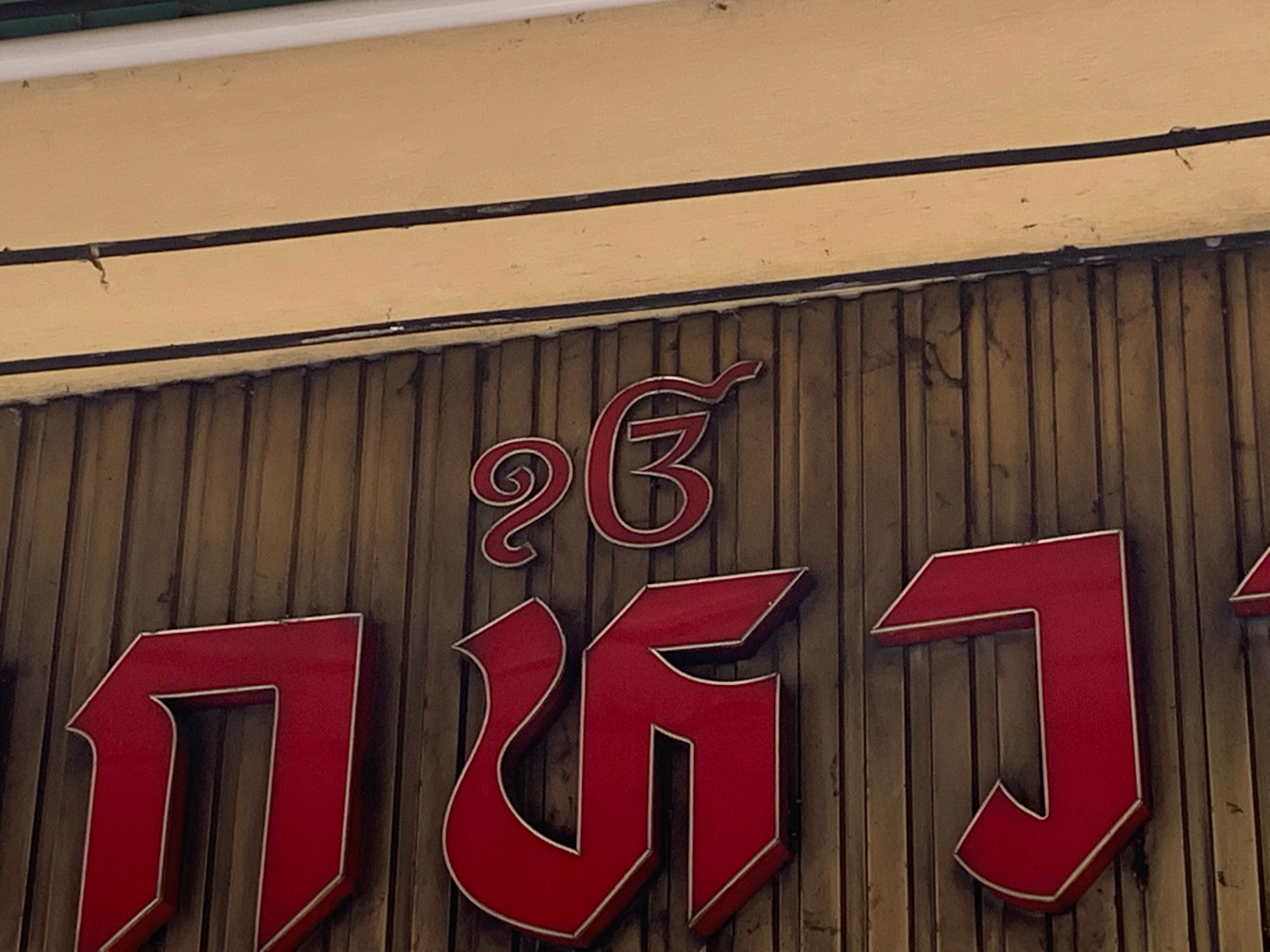
A shop sign in Bangkok with the symbol of Ek Onkar

A study of Sikh residents of Bangkok found that "Thai-Sikh identity is clear and well-maintained in Bangkok society", but that influences from Western and other societies were leading to the neglect of traditional lifestyle features. The Sikh community in Bangkok has been described as "the most integrated community in Thailand".

== History ==
According to Sikhologists Louis E. Fenech and W. H. McLeod, Thailand's Sikhs are unique in the region in that they are mostly descended from Namdhari goldsmiths from the Pothohar. This is in contrast with the Sikh communities of the surrounding countries, which mostly descend from Malayan Sikh policemen and soldiers who further migrated to those countries.

In 1894, British colonial authorities of the Straits Settlements (present-day Malaysia and Singapore), writing to the equivalent authorities in British India, were alarmed by a new immigration trend of an increasing number of Sikhs, whom after arriving in the colony, applied for certificates under Section 11 of [the Straits Immigration] Ordinance V of 1884, which allowed the holder to leave the colony to seek employment elsewhere. Sikhs in the Straits Settlements who successfully were granted this certificate migrated further on to areas like Sumatra, Borneo, and Siam.

=== Bangkok ===
Among the first Indians to arrive in Thailand was Kirparam Singh Madan in 1884. He was a Sehajdhari Sikh from Bhadewal village in the district of Sialkot (now in Pakistan). He was granted an audience with King Rama V of Thailand. He brought his relatives whose surnames were Madan, Narula and Chawla. They were among the first members of the Indian diaspora in Thailand, who started to arrive in the late 19th century.

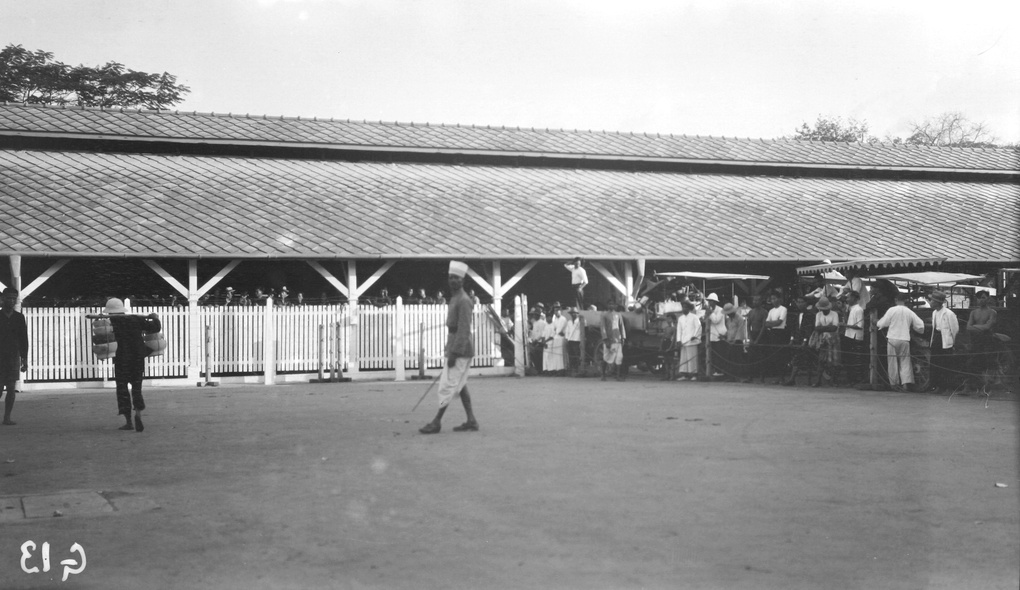
Workers and Sikh guard at Borneo Wharf, Bangkok, Thailand, circa December 1928 to June 1929

By 1911, many Sikh families had settled in Thailand. At that time Bangkok was the centre of migrant Sikhs, but there was no Gurdwara, so religious prayers were held in the homes of the Sikhs in rotation on every Sunday and all the Gurpurab days. In 1912, the Sikhs decided to establish a Gurdwara. A wooden house was rented in the vicinity of Baan Moh, a well known business area. In 1913 (or the year 2456 according to the Buddhist calendar), with the continuing increase of the Sikh community, a new larger wooden house was leased for a long term at the corner of Phahurat and Chakraphet roads. After considerable renovation and decoration, the Guru Granth Sahib was installed and religious prayers were conducted on a daily basis. Sikhs are mostly settled in area in area adjoining Pahurat Road. Most of them run real estate business or engaged in textile business.

Prior to his migration to Thailand, a Namdhari by the name of sardar Warayam Singh Khurana had a conflict with the Namdhari Guru in early 1962. He usually attends the S.G.S.S. Gurdwara in Bangkok wearing a blue turban.

As time passed, in 1979, the decision was made to renovate the Gurdwara and make it bigger to accommodate the increasing number of Sikhs. Together the committee of Siri Guru Singh Sabha and the other Thai-Sikhs decided to construct a new Gurdwara at the same location. The foundation stone was laid down by the Panj Piare, the Five Beloved Ones. The new Gurdwara was completed after two years in 1981.

=== Chiang Mai ===
The first Sikh person to travel to Chiang Mai was Ishar Singh, who traveled from India through Burma into Thailand in the year 1905 (or the year 2448 according to the Buddhist Calendar). Shortly after that about four more families came to Thailand. They were Rattan Singh, Gian Singh, Wariaam Singh and Amanda Singh. In 1907, this group of Sikhs decided to set up a Gurdwara in Charoenrat Road, which still stands at the location and now occupies a space of about 240 square meters.

=== Pattaya ===
In 1975 there were only around three or four Sikh families in Pattaya. But after Pattaya became a tourist resort, many Sikhs migrated from other provinces such as Ubol Ratchthani, Udon Ratchthani, Nakorn Ratchsima (Korat) and Sattahip.

=== Khon Kaen ===
In 1932, Sikhs started moving to Khon Kaen to start some kind of business and earn a living. Initially the Sikhs in Khon Kaen did not build a Gurdwara for performing religious ceremonies or prayers. Instead Sikh people's homes were used in rotation to perform these ceremonies on certain days. Later, in 1972, as the number of Sikhs increased, a Gurdwara was constructed. It is a two storey building, located in Ruamchit Road.

=== Lampang ===
The Gurdwara in Lampang was initially located in Sai Klang Road and was one of the old Gurdwaras in Thailand. In 1933, a Sikh named Wariaam Singh, donated a piece of land and started construction of the Gurdwara. Later, as the number of Sikhs increased, a new and bigger Gurdwara was constructed in Thip Chaang Road. On September 24, 1992 the foundation stone of the new Gurdwara was laid, gathering a large number of Sikh people from nearby provinces and Bangkok to witness the event.

=== Korat ===
In 1947, Sikhs started moving to Korat to start businesses and earn a living. Initially the Sikhs in Khon Kaen did not build a Gurdwara for performing religious ceremonies or prayers. Instead Sikh people's homes were used in rotation to perform these ceremonies on certain days. Later, as the number of Sikhs increased, a Gurdwara was constructed. On December 23, 1984, there was a parade held by the Sikh community through the town of Korat, to celebrate the opening ceremony of this Gurdwara.

=== Phuket ===
The first Gurdwara in Phuket was constructed by the Sikhs who had come to Phuket to work in tin mining and railway engineering under the supervision of the British in 1939. These groups of Sikhs were also involved in the Indian National Army (INA) during the World War II. Later, many Sikh businessmen started migrating to Phuket to start businesses in such fields as tailoring and hotels. More Sikhs moved to Phuket Province, when the province became one of the main tourist centres of Thailand. This led to a necessity to expand and renovate the Gurdwara to be able to accommodate the increasing number of Sikhs. The Gurdwara Committee of Phuket along with many other Sikhs together helped in constructing a new Gurdwara. The opening ceremony was held on January 22, 2001. The Chief Minister for this occasion was Privy Council Member, Bichit Kulavnich.

=== Relations with local people ===
During the colonial British period in Kelantan, which is adjacent to Thailand, many Sikh men living there married local Siamese women.

== Culture of Thai Sikhs ==
Thai Sikhs are noted for practicing astrology. Many Thai Sikhs are followers of the Namdhari sect of Sikhism, forming a significant portion of the Namdhari diaspora. A Sikh sect gaining followers in Thailand is the Neeldharis, who grow their followers through marriages with mainstream Sikhs, usually Neeldhari men pairing-up with mainstream Sikh women, with the wife's family gradually converting to the Neeldhari sect after the marriage.

== Gurudwaras in Thailand ==
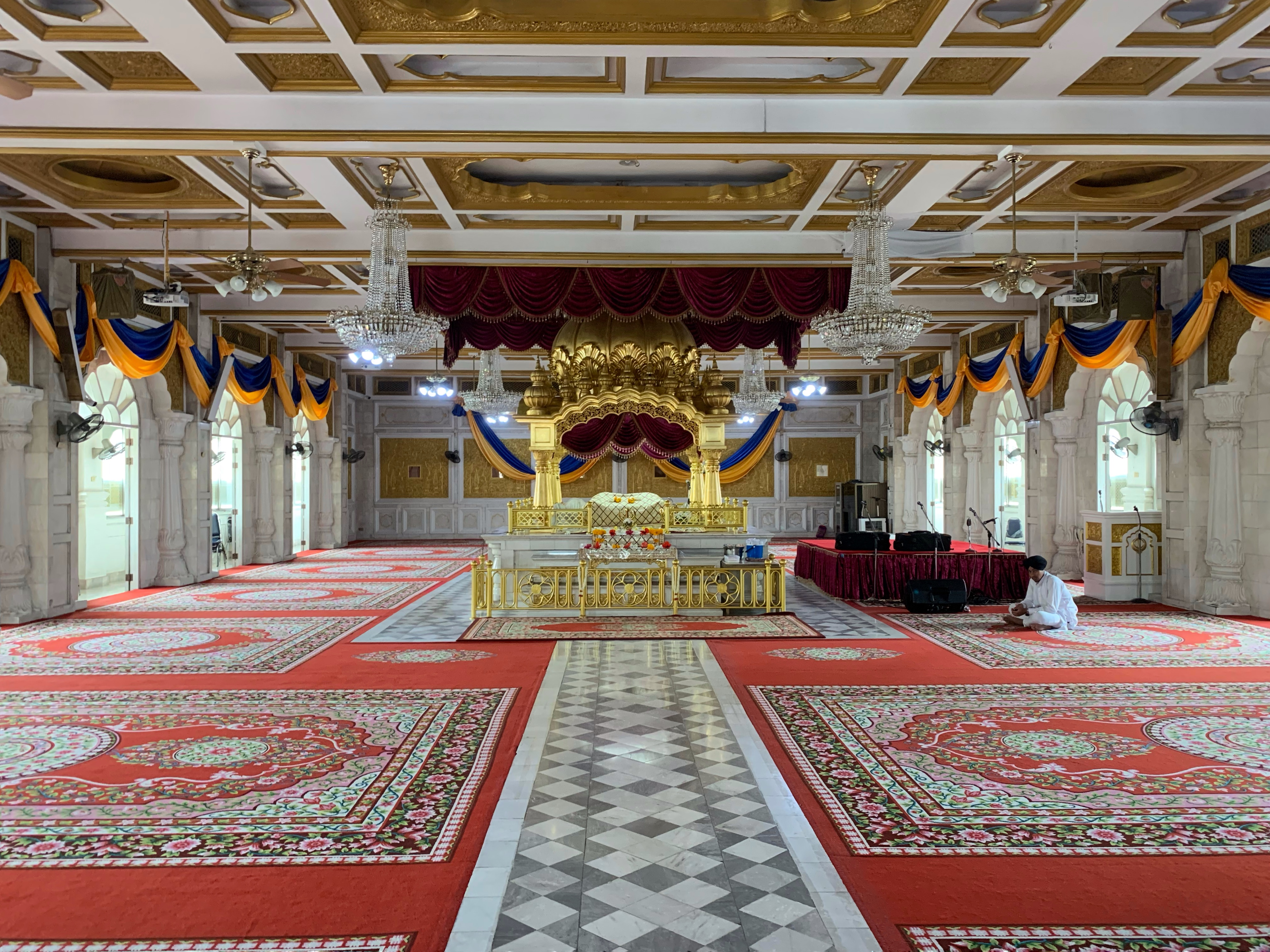
Gurdwara of Sri Guru Singh Sabha in Phahurat, Bangkok

In Thailand, Sikhs have constructed several Gurdwaras throughout the country. Currently there are Gurdwaras located in the following provinces:

- Bangkok, Phra Nakhon
- Chiang Mai, Mueang district
- Chiang Rai, Mueang district
- Chonburi, Pattaya
- Khon Kaen, Mueang district
- Lampang, Mueang district
- Nakhon Phanom, Mueang district
- Nakhon Ratchasima, Mueang district
- Nakhon Sawan, Mueang district
- Pattani, Mueang district
- Phuket, Mueang district
- Samut Prakan, Mueang district
- Songkhla, Hat Yai district
- Trang, Mueang district
- Ubon Ratchathani, Mueang district
- Udon Thani, Mueang district
- Yala, Mueang district

== See also ==
- Raaginder
- Fateh (rapper)
- Jainism in Southeast Asia
- Hinduism in Southeast Asia
