= Sri Maha Mariamman Temple, Bangkok =

Hindu temple in Bangkok, Thailand

Sri Maha Mariamman Temple
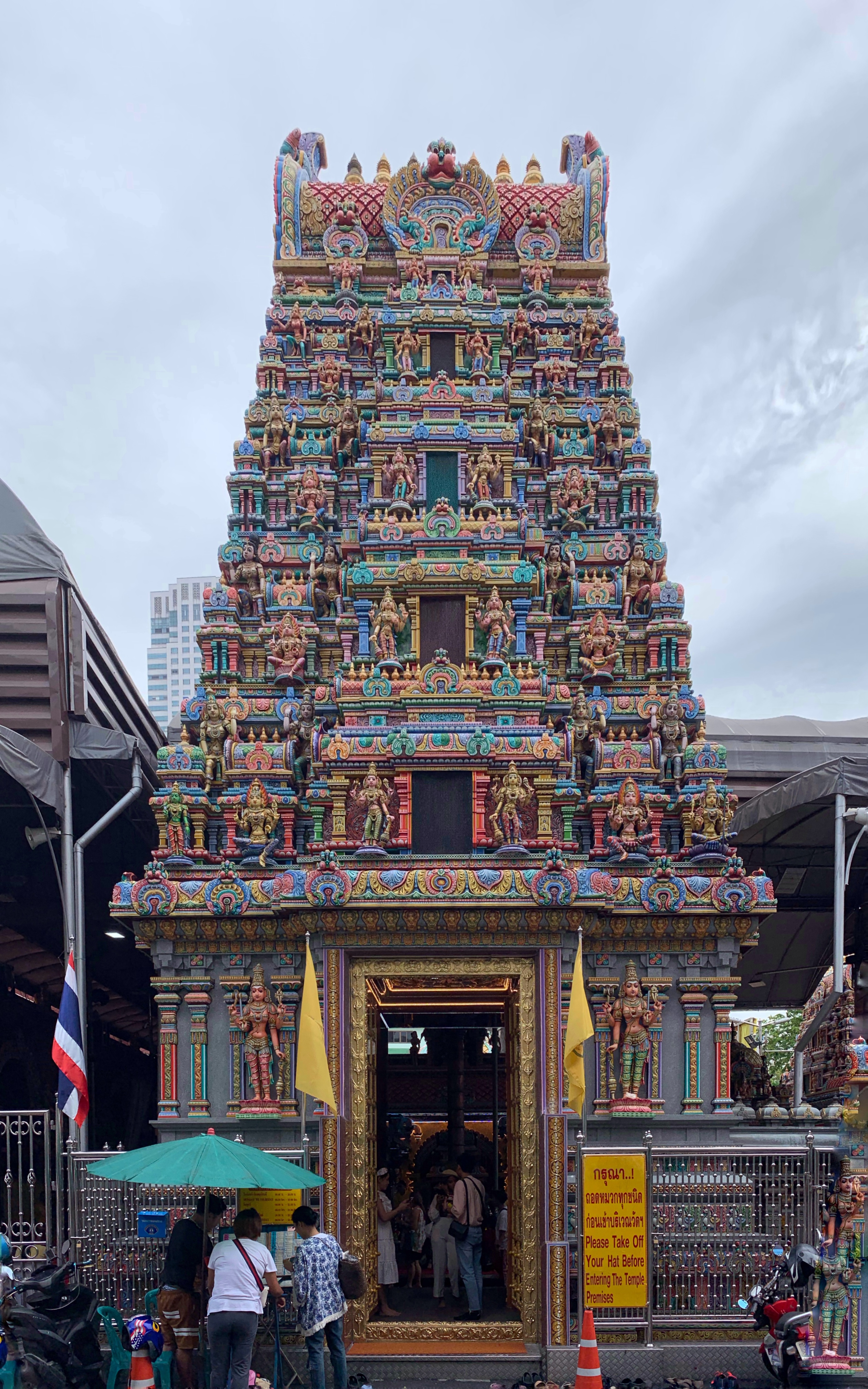
- Gopuram of Sri Maha Mariamman Koyil, Bangkok

- Location within Bangkok

Religion
- Affiliation: Hinduism
- District: Bangrak
- Province: Bangkok
- Deity: Mariamman
- Festival: Navaratri

Location
- Location: 2, Si Lom Road, Si Lom Subdistrict, Bangrak District, Bangkok, Thailand
- Country: Thailand
- Interactive map of Sri Maha Mariamman Temple
- Coordinates: 13°43′27.3″N 100°31′22.5″E

Architecture
- Type: South Indian Architecture
- Creator: Vaithi Padayatchi
- Completed: 1879
- Elevation: 3.45 m (11 ft)

Sri Maha Mariamman Temple (Tamil: அருள்மிகு ஶ்ரீ மஹாமாரி அம்மன் கோவில்), also known as Maha Uma Devi Temple (Thai: วัดพระศรีมหาอุมาเทวี; RTGS: Wat Phra Si Maha Umathewi and Wat Khaek (วัดแขก) (Note: Meaning the 'Indian temple', Khaek being a term, albeit one increasingly perceived as offensive, used for 'people of Indian origin'.) in Thai, is a South Indian architecture style Hindu temple on Si Lom Road in Bangkok, Thailand. It was built in 1879 by Vaithi Padayatchi, a Tamil Hindu immigrant.

== Location ==
Sri Mariamman Temple is the main Tamil Hindu temple in Thailand and is located in the Bang Rak District of Bangkok at the corner of Silom Road (ถนนสีลม) and Pan Road, a narrower road where a number of kiosks sell saffron-coloured marigold flower garlands for worshippers.

== History ==
Following India becoming a colony of the British Empire in 1858 many from the southern state of Tamil Nadu preferred to leave their country than live under colonial rule. One such group of Indians came to Bangkok, many as traders of gemstones or cattle ranchers. A leader of this group of Indians was Vaithi Padayatchi who built this temple about a decade after they arrived; and a street in Silom is named after him - Soi Vaiti - shown on many English street maps as Vithy or Waiti Lane.

Sri Mariamman is the oldest and most important such temple in Thailand.

== Features ==
The temple's facade is in strikingly florid style of a riot of different colours with carved images of various gods and goddesses in different shapes and sizes. At the entrance to the temple there is a gopura or tower 6 metres in height and covered with many carved images of deities. The main shrine of the temple complex is a dome with covering of a gilded copper plate. Within the premises of the temple complex there are three shrines dedicated to Ganesh, Kartik and the main shrine of Sri Maha Mariamman. The practice of worship followed by the devotees is sequentially Ganesh, Murugan(Kartikeya) and then the main deity. The main hall of the shrine is also decorated with statue, deity in Hinduism and Bronze Material (from left to right) of Ganesh, Shiva, Krishna, Vishnu, Lakshmi, Kartik, Mariamman, Kali, Saraswati, and Nataraja with Shivakami, Hanuman. In addition there are also shrines dedicated to the worship of gods Shiva Lingam, Brahma, Navagraha, Aiyanar, Saptha Kanni, Periyachi, Madurai Veeran and Kathavarayan.

== Festivals ==
Stalls near the temple sell flowers, garlands, coconuts and incense to be used in worship, as Mariamman Temple is an important landmark for the Bangkok Tamil Hindu community, as well as a large number of Thai people. It is said that 85% of the Thais visit the temple, many believing that Hinduism is not a separate religion but a branch of Buddhism. Religious festivals, such as Navratri, take place here following the traditional Tamil calendar in September/October. This festival, which is believed to give redress from bad luck, is held for ten days and on the final day the street in front of the temple is colourfully decorated with yellow flower garlands and candles, and the image of Sri Mariamman is taken through the streets in a procession; during this time a portion of the Silom is blocked to traffic. Deepavali is also a special festival in the temple when it is brightly lit up. An oil lamp ritual is held on most middays' and on Fridays, and prasad, food blessed by god, is distributed to devotees. Apart from these two major festivals, daily worships are attended by a large number of Thai Buddhists and Chinese who believe that Hindu gods help them in business and bless their women to conceive.

== Gallery ==
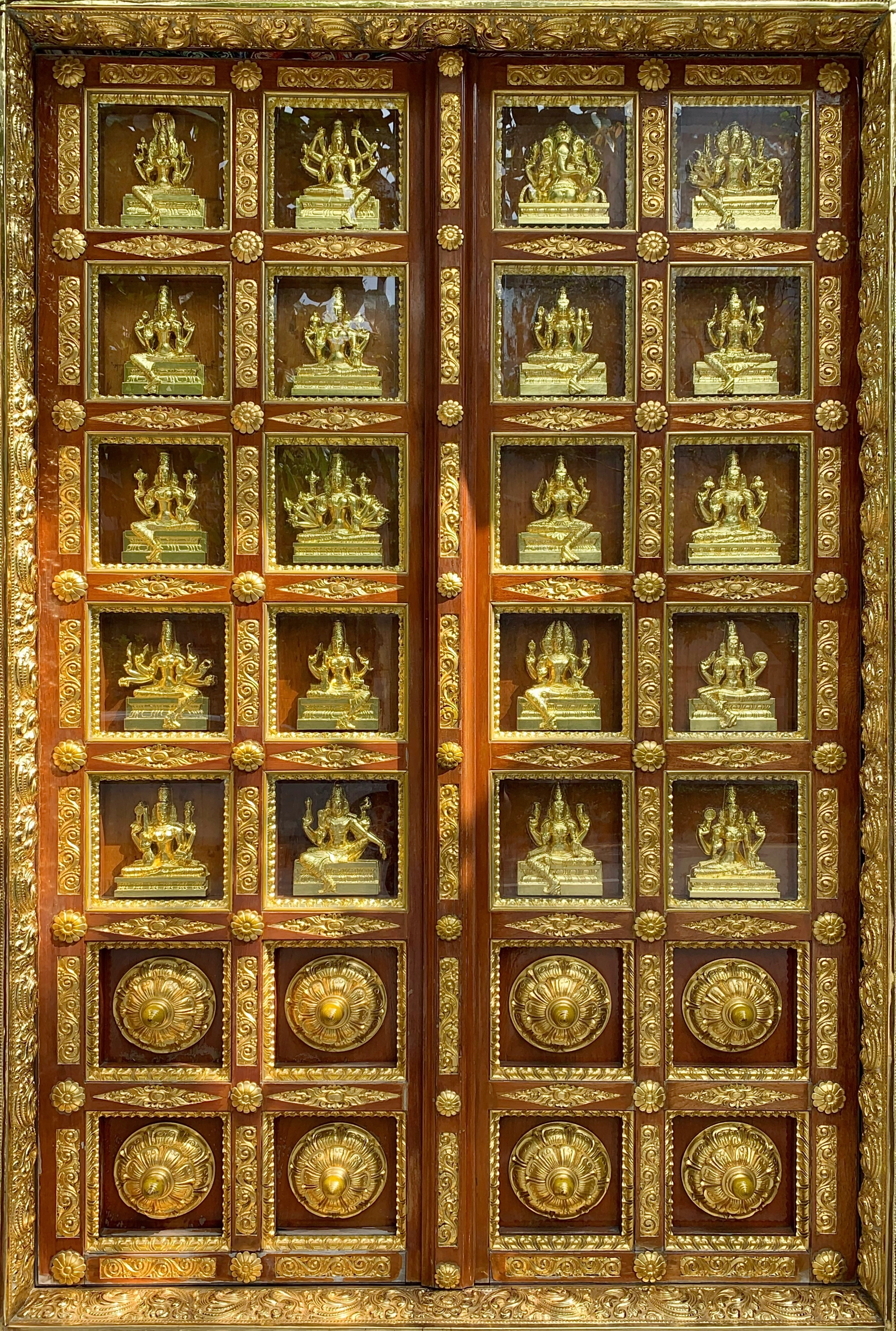

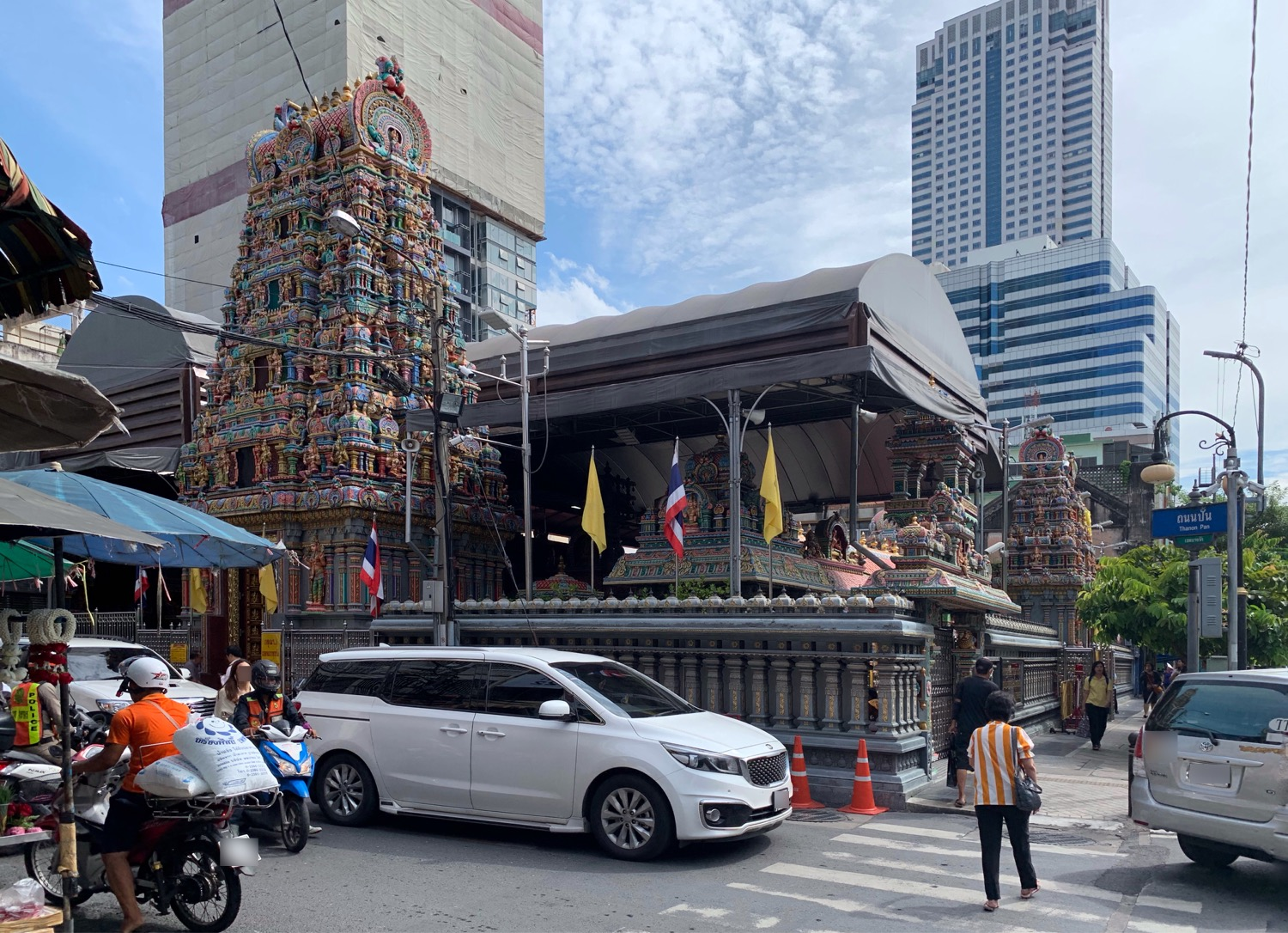

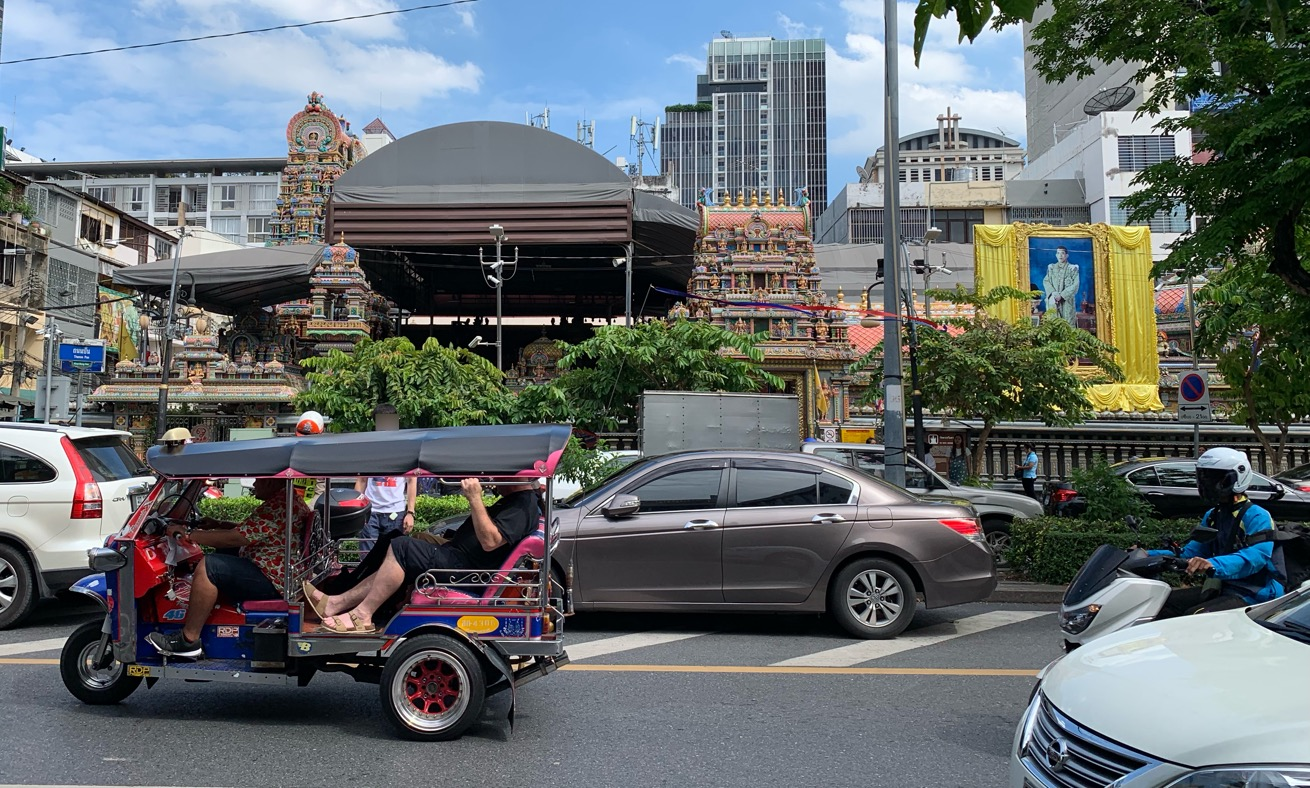

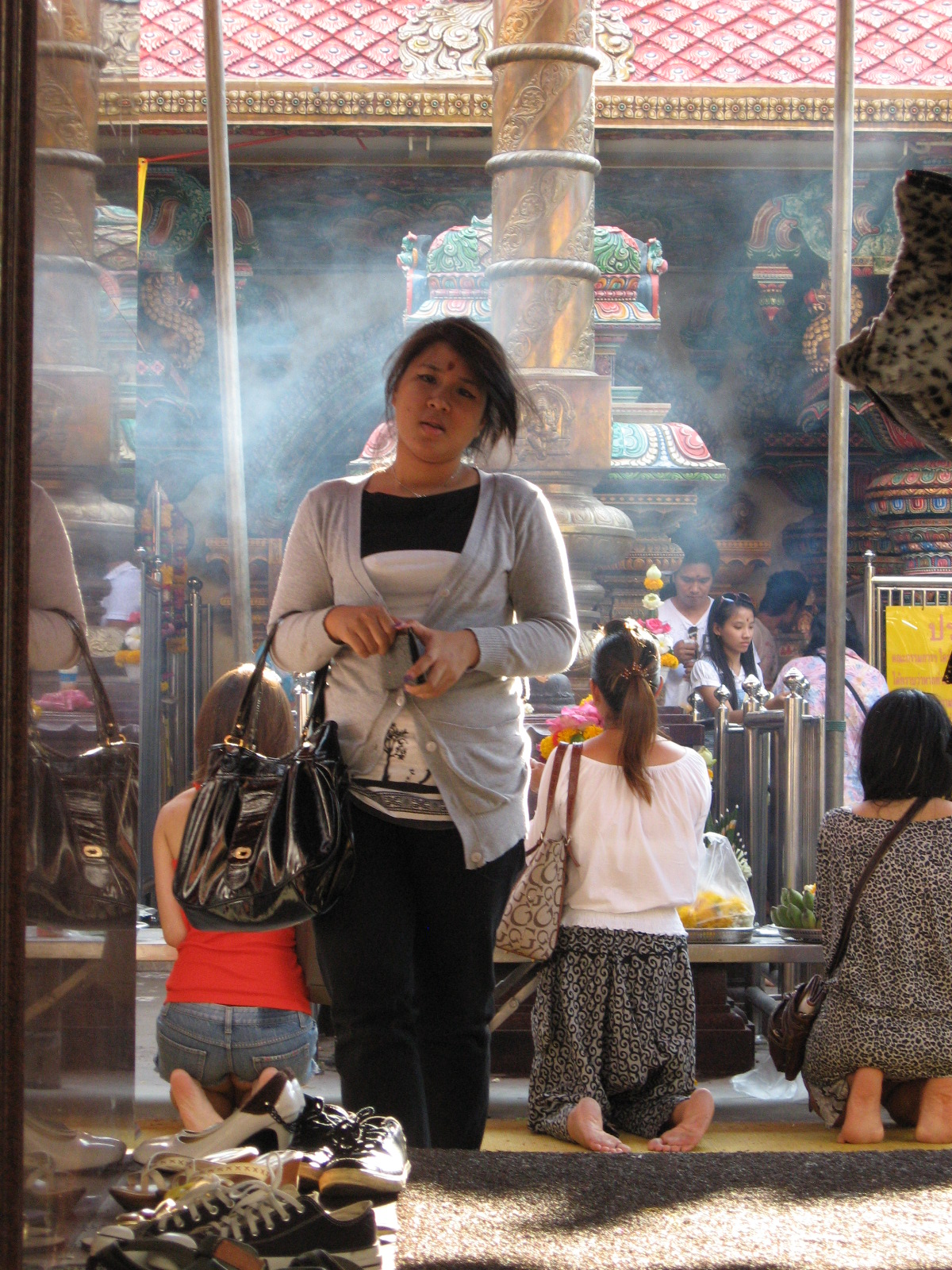

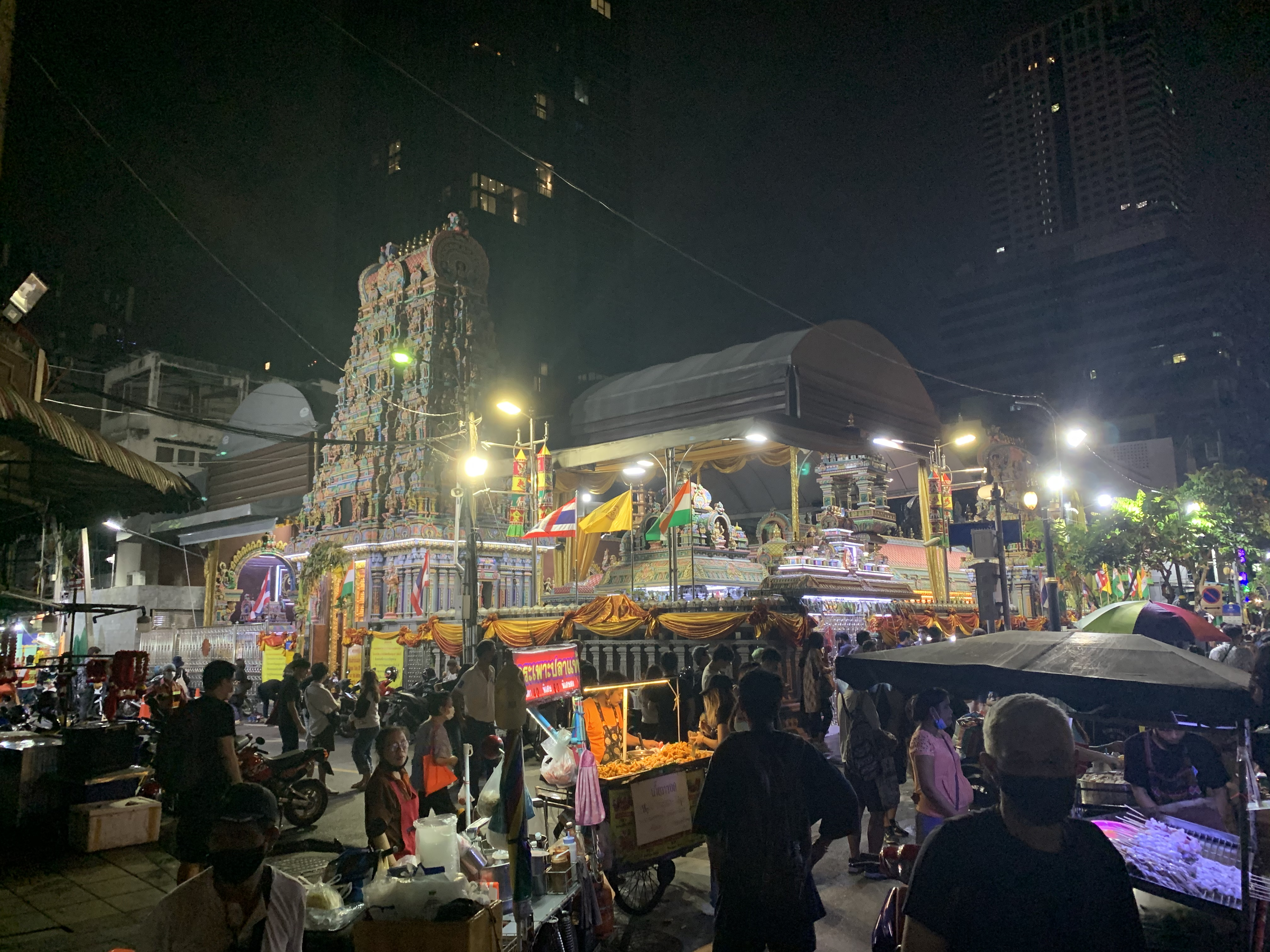

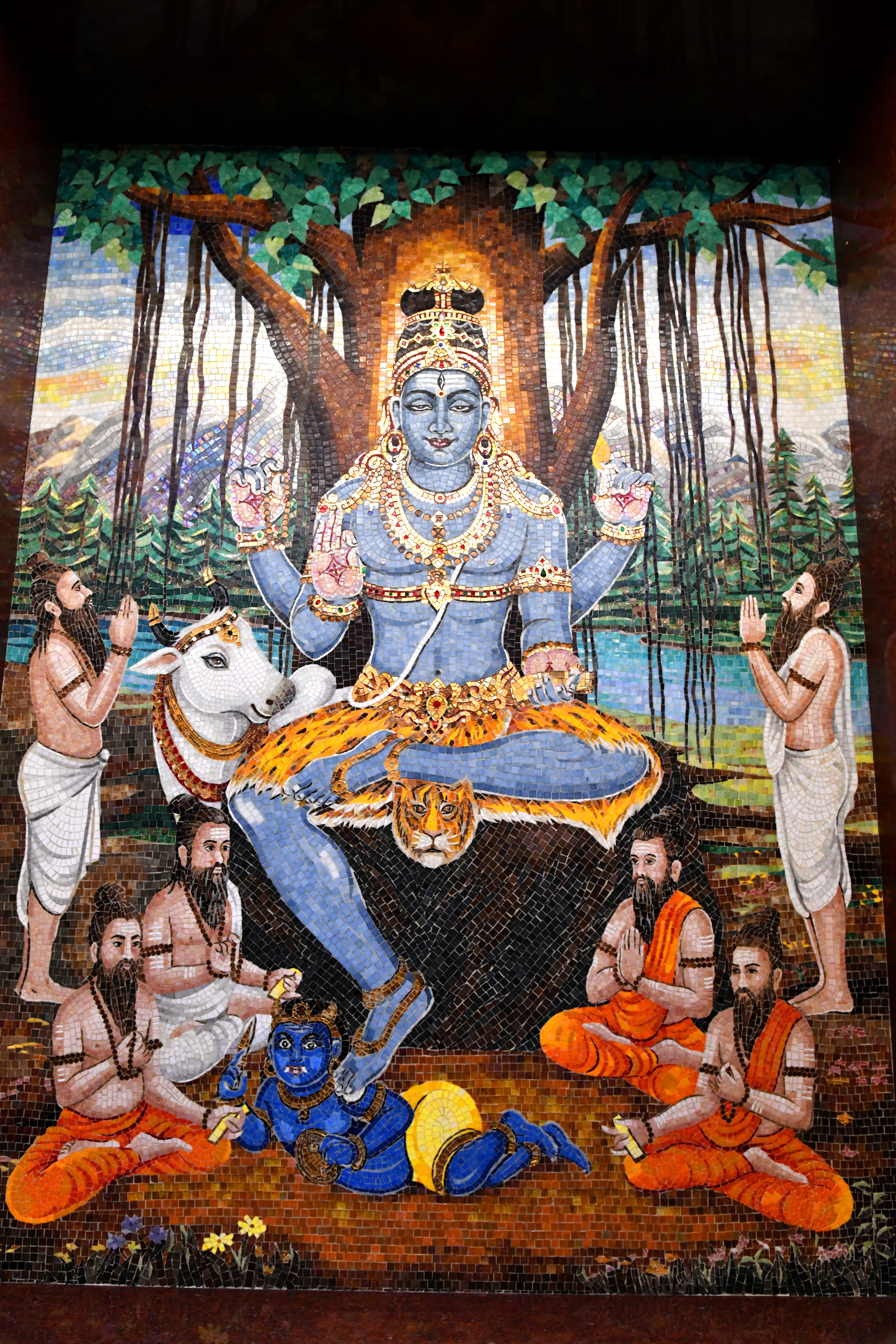

== See also ==
- Hinduism in Thailand
- Indians in Thailand

== Bibliography ==
- Barrett, Kenneth (18 February 2014). 22 Walks in Bangkok: Exploring the City's Historic Back Lanes and Byways. Tuttle Publishing. ISBN 978-1-4629-1380-0.
- Bracken, Gregory Byrne (30 March 2011). A Walking Tour Bangkok: Sketches of the city's architectural treasures. Marshall Cavendish International Asia Pte Ltd. ISBN 978-981-4312-98-1.
- Cush, Denise; Robinson, Catherine; York, Michael (21 August 2012). Encyclopedia of Hinduism. Routledge. ISBN 978-1-135-18978-5.
- Guelden, Marlane (2007). Thailand: Spirits Among Us. Marshall Cavendish International (Asia) Private Limited. ISBN 978-981-261-075-1.
- Kesavapany, K; Mani, A; Ramasamy, P (2008). Rising India and Indian Communities in East Asia. Institute of Southeast Asian Studies. ISBN 978-981-230-799-6.
- Manguin, Pierre-Yves; Mani, A.; Wade, Geoff (2011). Early Interactions Between South and Southeast Asia: Reflections on Cross-cultural Exchange. Institute of Southeast Asian Studies. ISBN 978-981-4345-10-1.
- Sandhu, K S; Mani, A (2006). Indian Communities in Southeast Asia. Institute of Southeast Asian Studies. ISBN 978-981-230-418-6.
