= List of ambassadors of Thailand to India =

Coordinates: 28.566408°N 77.155891°E

Her Excellency Chavanart Thangsumphant

Thailand Ambassador to India
- Incumbent
- Assumed office 29 May 2025
- Prime Minister: Paetongtarn Shinawatra
- Preceded by: Pattarat Hongtong

The Thai Ambassador in New Delhi is the official representative of the Government in Bangkok to the Government of India.

== List of representatives ==
Diplomatic agreement/designated/Diplomatic accreditation	Buddhist calendar	Ambassador	Thai language	Observations	List of prime ministers of Thailand (at time of induction)	List of prime ministers of India (at the time of induction)	Term end	Buddhist calendar
1947	2490	Thanat Khoman	ถนัด คอมันตร์	chargé d'affaires, later became foreign minister of Thailand (1959–1971)	Khuang Aphaiwong	Jawaharlal Nehru		
1949	2492	Luang Pinit Aksorn (Wong Pinitakson)	หลวง พินิจอักษร (วงษ์ พินิจอักษร)	ambassador	Phibul Songkhram	Jawaharlal Nehru	1952	2495
1952	2495	Luang Wichitwathakan (Wichit Wichitwathakan)	หลวง วิจิตรวาทการ (วิจิตร วิจิตรวาทการ)	former minister of foreign affairs (1942–43)	Phibul Songkhram	Jawaharlal Nehru	1953	2496
1953	2496	Luang Bhadravadi	หลวง ภัทรวาที (ศุภ วารวารศิริ)		Phibul Songkhram	Jawaharlal Nehru	1954	2497
1955	2498	Phra Bahiddha Nukara	พระ พหิทธานุกร (ส่วน นวราช)	(1894-1963)	Phibul Songkhram	Jawaharlal Nehru	1957	2500
1957	2500	Boon Charoenchai	บุณย์ เจริญชัย		Pote Sarasin	Jawaharlal Nehru	1959	2502
1959	2502	Sukich Nimmanheminda	สุกิจ นิมมานเหมินห์	former minister of economics (1957–58), deputy prime minister (1958, 1973–74); also accredited in Afghanistan, Nepal and Sri Lanka	Sarit Dhanarajata	Jawaharlal Nehru	1963	2506
July 9, 1963	2506	Chitti Sucharitakul	จิตติ สุจริตกุล	His wife, novelist Dok Mai Sod, died of heart failure in New Delhi.	Thanom Kittikachorn	Jawaharlal Nehru	1967	2510
1968	2511	Prince Prem Purachatra	พระวรวงศ์เธอ พระองค์เจ้าเปรมบุรฉัตร	(*12 August 1915 – 24 July 1981) son of Princess Prabhavasidhi Narumala and Purachatra Jayakara. A royal decree dated 21 February 1972 appoints Prince Prem Burachatara, Thai ambassador to India, as the new ambassador of Thailand to Denmark and Norway succeeding Wiwat na Pomphet. M.A. (Oxon), D.Litt., Thai Ambassador to India, Ceylon, and Nepal ft Minister to Afghanistan, b. Aug. 12, 1915; Educ. : Harrow and New College, Oxford. Lecturer at Chulalongkorn Univ., Bangkok,	Thanom Kittikachorn	Indira Gandhi	1972	2515
1972	2515	Owart Suthiwart-Narueput	โอวาท สุทธิวาทนฤพุฒิ	The present Thai Ambassador to. India will be accredited to Poland, a report said on October 25. Owart Suthiwart-Narueput. Born 19 September 1926. Married to Angkana. One son and one	Thanom Kittikachorn|	Indira Gandhi	1975	2518
1976	2519	Suchati Chuthasmit	สุชาติ จุฑาสมิต	concurrently Thai ambassador to Sri Lanka.	Seni Pramoj	Indira Gandhi	1980	2523
1980	2523	Somboon Rochanakorn	สมบุญ โรจนกร		Prem Tinsulanonda	Indira Gandhi	1981	2524
November 30, 1981	2524	Sumesr Siri-Mongkol	สุเมศร ศิริมงคล		Prem Tinsulanonda	Indira Gandhi	1983	2526
1983	2526	Phirat Itsarasena	พิรัฐ อิศรเสนา		Prem Tinsulanonda	Indira Gandhi	1987	2530
1987	2530	Nikorn Praisaengpetch	นิกร พรายแสงเพ็ชร์		Prem Tinsulanonda	Rajiv Gandhi	1991	2534
1991	2534	Praphol Narinthrangura	ประพจน์ นรินทรางกูร ณ อยุธยา		Anand Panyarachun	P. V. Narasimha Rao	1993	2536
April 2, 1994	2537	Vichai Vannasin	วิชัย วรรณสิน		Suchinda Kraprayoon	P. V. Narasimha Rao	1998	2541
1998	2541	Thawatjai Thavisri	ธวัชชัย ทวีศรี		Chuan Leekpai	Atal Bihari Vajpayee	2000	2543
2000	2543	Bandhit Sotipalait	บัณฑิต โสตถิพลาฤทธิ์		Chuan Leekpai	Atal Bihari Vajpayee	2002	2545
2002	2545	ChirasakThanesnant	จีระศักดิ์ ธเนศนันท์		Thaksin Shinawatra	Atal Bihari Vajpayee	2008	2551
August 11, 2009	2552	Krit Kraichitti	กฤต ไกรจิตติ	former Thai ambassador to Vietnam (2005)	Samak Sundaravej	Manmohan Singh	2011	2554
2011	2554	Pisan Manawapat	พิศาล มาณวพัฒน์		Yingluck Shinawatra	Manmohan Singh	2013	2556
2013	2556	Chalit Manityakul	ชลิต มานิตยกุล		Yingluck Shinawatra	Manmohan Singh	2016	2559
2017	2560	Chutinthorn Gongsakdi	นายชุตินทร คงศักดิ์		Prayut Chan-o-cha	Narendra Modi	2020	2563
2021	2564	Pattarat Hongtong	นางสาวภัทรัตน์ หงษ์ทอง		Prayut Chan-o-cha	Narendra Modi	2025	2568
2025	2568	Chavanart Thangsumphant	นางสาวชวนาถ ทั่งสัมพันธ์		Paetongtarn Shinawatra	Narendra Modi	-	-

== See also ==
- India–Thailand relations
- Embassy of Thailand New Delhi, former-ambassadorsRELATIONSHIPS BETWEEN THAILAND AND INDIA
