= Neeldhari =

Sikh sect

- Classification: Sikhism
- Leader: Nirmal Singh
- Headquarters: Naushehra Majha Singh
- Founder: Harnam Singh
- Origin: Nangal Duna Singh
- Separated from: Namdharis
- Official website: https://web.archive.org/web/20041127045134/http://neeldhari.com/

Neeldharis (meaning "wearer of a blue [belt]"), alternatively spelt as Nildhari, are a heterodoxical sect within Sikhism that was founded by Harnam Singh. Neeldharis are a derivative of the Namdharis. The majority of Neeldharis today live in Southeast Asia, particularly Bangkok, Thailand.

== History ==
The Neeldharis were founded by Harnam Singh (1877–1980) and is headquartered at Naushehra Majha Singh, a locality located on the Amritsar-Pathankot Road. (Note: The Neeldhari sect is known as "Neeldhari Sant Khalsa" and "Dera Sant Maharaj Harnam Singh". Harnam Singh is popularly known as "Sant Baijnath Wale".) Harnam Singh was originally a Namdhari Sikh but he grew popular as a religious man in his own right and eventually had a falling out with the Namdhari leadership. Harnam Singh established a dera and gaushala (shelter for stray cows) at village Nangal Duna Singh. After the partition of Punjab, the Neeldharis and their founder originally planned to relocate to Baijnath but settled in Naushehra Majha Singh instead. The Neeldharis believed that Harnam Singh was the messenger of God who could solve their problems. They further believed that Harnam Singh had supernatural powers and could grant wishes.

The Neeldharis rejected the code of conduct of the Namdharis, as the Namdharis at the time requested that Harnam Singh get rid of his shudra cook in order to be re-accepted back into the Namdhari fold. In 1955, the concept of wah wah was introduced to the Neeldhari sect and in 1966, the neela-bana concept was introduced. The adoption of a blue dress by the Neeldharis was a sign of their disapproval of the Namdharis, who wore customary white clothing. Harnam Singh claimed to adopt neela-bana based on a divine message he had received, as blue was the dress of Guru Gobind Singh. Harnam Singh further claimed that neela-bana was necessary in Kaljug (age of darkness) to signify that human beings were born as sinners (gunahgar). Further refuting any kinship with Kukaism, the Neeldharis later rejected Balak Singh and Ram Singh as being an 11th or 12th guru. However, early-on the Neeldharis believed in a continuity of Sikh guruship.

When Harnam Singh died on 11 October 1980, the Neeldharis did not follow mainstream Sikh funerary practices but rather they held an akhand path recitation and performed bhog but kept the remains of Harnam Singh in a coffin and interred it into a bhora (underground pit). Later, a gumbad (tomb) was built over the pit and a Guru Granth Sahib was installed within the gumbad. Harnam Singh had said that just like how Christians believe that their dead shall rise on the day of judgement (known as qayamat), him and his close associates would arise from the dead. This belief led to the practice of burying the remains of high-standing Neeldhari Sikhs within the confines of the dera complex. These heterodoxical practices regarding the remains of their founder lasted for 18 years. The Neeldharis believed that Harnam Singh would appear again and a sub-sect of the Neeldharis even believed he had reincarnated in Haryana.

Since the death of Harnam Singh in 1980, the Neeldharis began to become closer to mainstream Khalsa Sikhism, perhaps due to the pressures of Sikh militants of the era. The practice of venerating a tomb and Guru Granth Sahib at the same place offended the mainstream Sikhs, with the Akal Takht passing a hukamnama on 9 May 1998 addressed to the Neeldhari leaders to remove the tomb, construct a proper gurdwara instead, and stop believing in the continuance of living gurus. The Akal Takht gave the Neeldharis one-month to satisfy its demands.

In 2017, the Sarbat Khalsa jathedars ex-communicated the Neeldhari leader Satnam Singh Pipliwale from the Sikh religion for alleged "objectionable religious utterings".

== Beliefs and practices ==
They believe in the concept of living gurus (known as dehdhari) succeeding the mainstream Sikh gurus. They do not follow the mainstream Sikh maryada. The Neeldharis are named after their dress-code worn by both men and women, which mandates that they wear blue-and-white-coloured garbs known as neela-bana, consisting of a white kurta-pyjama, a blue scarf called a chakuta (substitute for a white turban), and a blue waistband known as a kamarkassa. Furthermore, followers of the sect keep a small stick called a saila, an iron vessel referred to as a gadva, and they also keep a rosary. Orthodox Neeldhari Sikhs wear wooden footwear known as khadawan.

The title of the Neeldhari maryada (code of conduct) is Ath Rahit Maryada Guru Ji Ki. The maryada seems to point to the fact that the Neeldharis replaced the position of Namdhari Guru Ram Singh with their own Harnam Singh. In the Neeldhari maryada, many similarities can be linked to the Namdhari code of conduct, such as rising early in the morning, removing kamarkasa, urinating or defecating, brushing, bathing, and changing their bana (clothes). They use a white towel or scarf to dry themselves. Their nitnem shares much in common with the mainstream Sikh nitnem, however they are also recommended to recite banis such as the Asa-di-Var, Akal Ustat, Chandi-di-Var, Ugardhanti, Bara Maha Majh Mahala Panjvan, and the Bara Maha Tukhari as additional banis to recite daily. Furthermore, Neeldharis are requested to mutter the word Wah (acclaiment of the wonderous God) continuously throughout their day. The Neeldhari maryada abandons the kirpan, kara, and dastar, which differs it considerably from both the mainstream Sikh maryada and Namdhari maryada.

In Thailand, the Neeldharis propagate their sect through preaching and also through marriage matchmaking. The Neeldharis of Thailand grow their followers through marriages with mainstream Sikhs, usually Neeldhari men pairing-up with mainstream Sikh women, with the wife's family gradually converting to the Neeldhari sect after the marriage.
