= Kathavarayan (deity) =

Hindu folk deity

- Guardian deity of Thanjavur and lovers
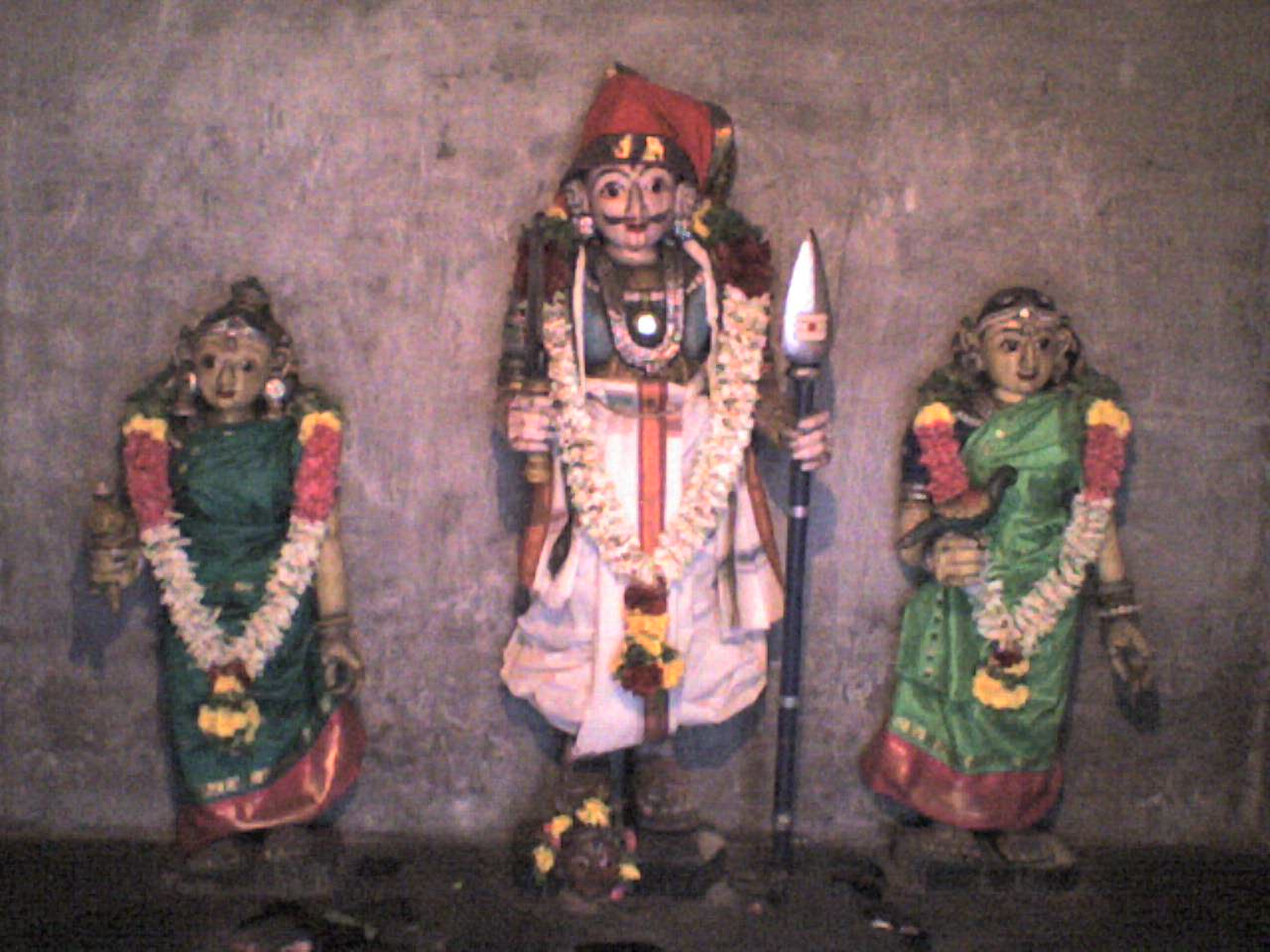
- Statue of Lord Kathavarayan and two his wife in Masi Periasamy Temple
- Venerated in: India and Sri Lanka
- Weapon: Aruval, Spear, Gada, Sword, and Shield
- Mount: Horse
- Consort: Ariyamala and Otanyi

Kathavarayan (Kātaātavarāya - காத்தவராய) is a Tamil folk deity venerated in South India and Sri Lanka. His worship is prevalent amongst rural Tamil people, as his worship mostly happens in rural Tamil Nadu. His name is a combination of two names: "kathavar" (protector) and :"ayan" (gift of God). He is believed to have been a real person as Tamil folk deities are those who performed superhuman deeds to protect their community or villages.

== Iconography ==
Lord Kathavarayan is widely recognized by having a distinct mustache and fearsome appearance. Kathavarayan is commonly depicted wielding weapons of the Tamil warriors of ancient South India: an Aruval, a Khanda (sword), a Sword, a Gada or Shield. He is often illustrated as standing or seated with his two wives, Ariyamala (ஆரியமாலா) and Otanyi (ஓந்தாயி), as well as one male attendant by the name of Chinnan (சின்னான்).

== Beyond the Indian subcontinent and Hinduism ==
He is highly revered in Thai Hinduism due to the popularity of the Sri Maha Mariamman Temple, Bangkok. Thai people flock to the temple to pay respects since it was a perfect blend between Tamil and Thai folk culture as seen with practices such as Arul Vaaku tradition (deity possession). Kathavarayan's statue is enshrined in the temple's procession, an important of Vijayadashami traditional event, annually.

== See also ==
- Madurai Veeran
- Ayyappan
- Karuppu Sami
- Village deities of South India
- Shasta (deity)
- Ayyanayake
