= India Thai Business Forum =

India-Thai Business Forum (ITBF) is a business forum.

== Introduction ==
The forum started in October, 2002 with 15 members. Now there are more than 150 members. The forum is an appropriate interactive platform, specially for entrepreneurs/professionals of Indian origin. One of the activities of the forum is to hold the monthly dinner meeting on every third Wednesday of the month, in which they invite a Thai or Indian dignitary as their guest speaker. Since its inception, they have never missed the monthly dinner meeting with a guest speaker. In fact, in some months they have had more than one meetings. Monthly meetings start with a short networking session where members meet each other and exchange notes on business as well as personal activities. The networking session is followed by the guest speaker presentation and a sumptuous buffet Indian dinner.

== Speakers ==
ITBF has had leading dignitaries including influential Thai and Indian economists/politicians and other important figures as guest speakers at monthly dinner meetings. On 16 August 2006 the guest speaker is Abhisit Vejjajiva - Leader of Democratic Party of Thailand spoke on "Look West: Rethinking Thailand's Policy Towards India".

== Members ==
The members of India Thai Business Forum are leading businessmen who indulge in trade activities between India and Thailand. Members of the press and The Indian Embassy also attend regularly.
