= Hinduism in Thailand =

Hinduism in Thailand ศาสนาฮินดูในประเทศไทย
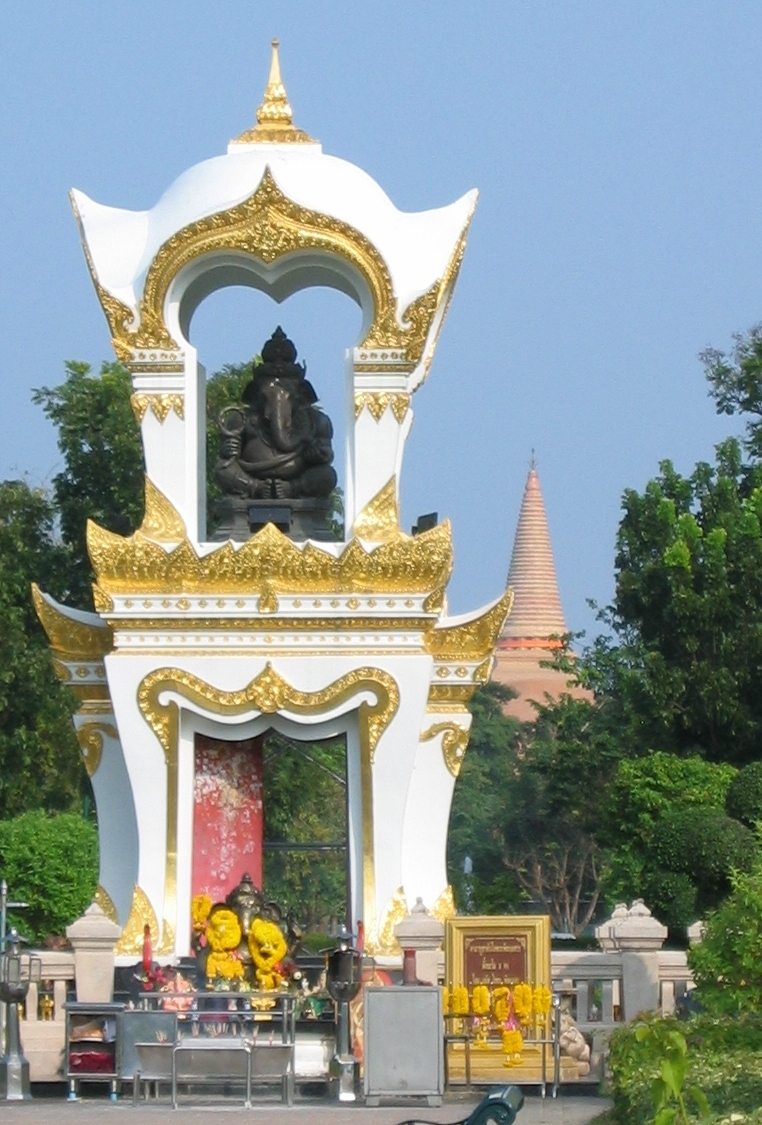
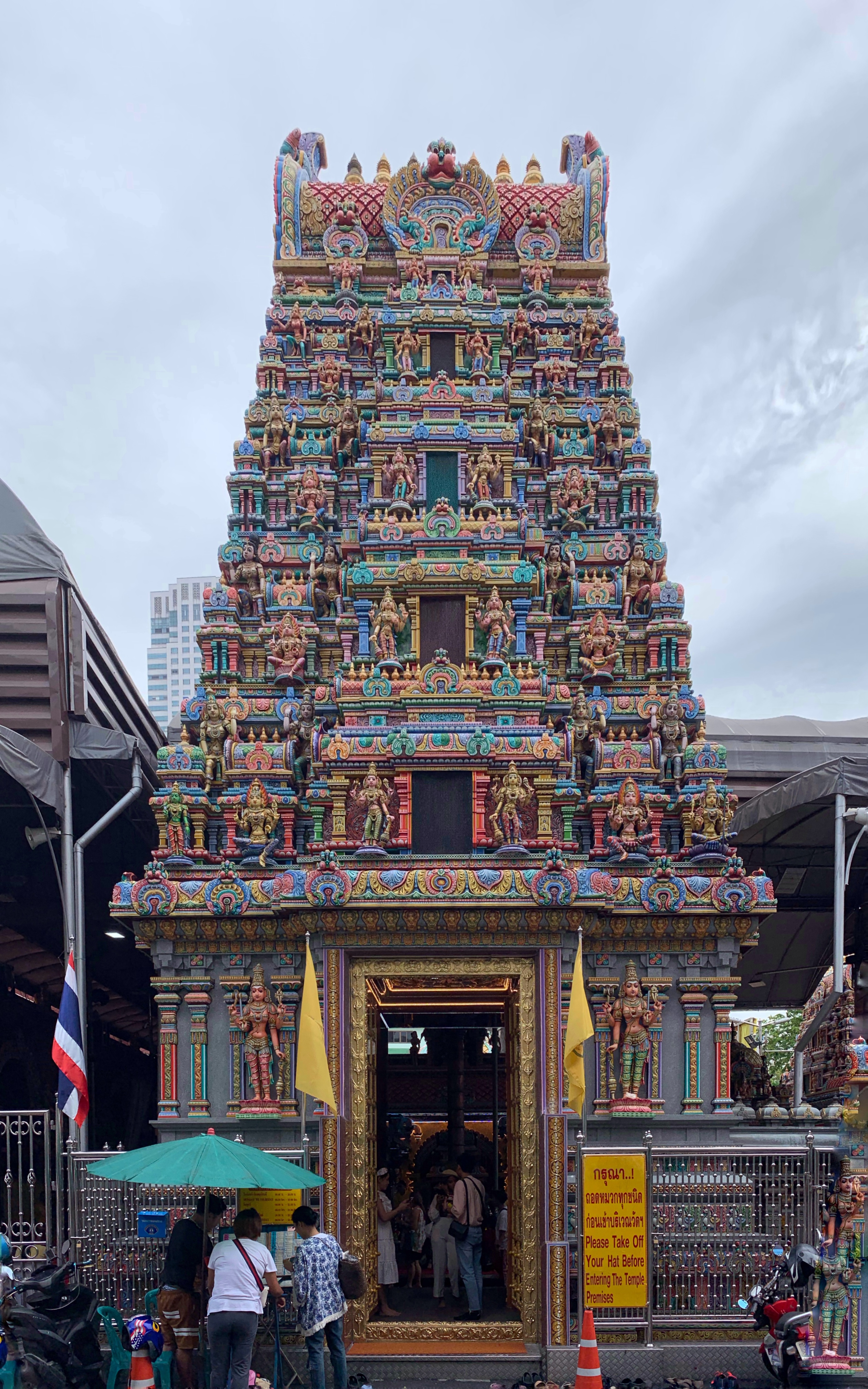
- Examples of Hindu sites in Thailand, from left to right and top to bottom: Devasthan in Bangkok, Ganesha Shrine at Sanam Chandra Palace in Nakhon Pathom, Sri Maha Mariamman Temple in Bangkok, Phra Prang Sam Yot in Lopburi

Total population
- ▲28,900 (0.04%)

Regions with significant populations
- Bangkok, Chonburi and Phuket

Religions
- Hinduism; Majority: Vaishnavism; Minority: Shaivism

Languages
- Sacred; Sanskrit; Majority; Thai, Hindi, Tamil

Hinduism in Thailand is a minority religion followed by 29,900 (0.04%) of the population as of 2020. Despite being a Buddhist-majority nation, Thailand has a very strong Hindu influence. The majority of Thai Hindus reside in Bangkok, Chonburi, and Phuket. Ramakien (the Thai version of Ramayana) is recognised as the country's national epic.

== History ==
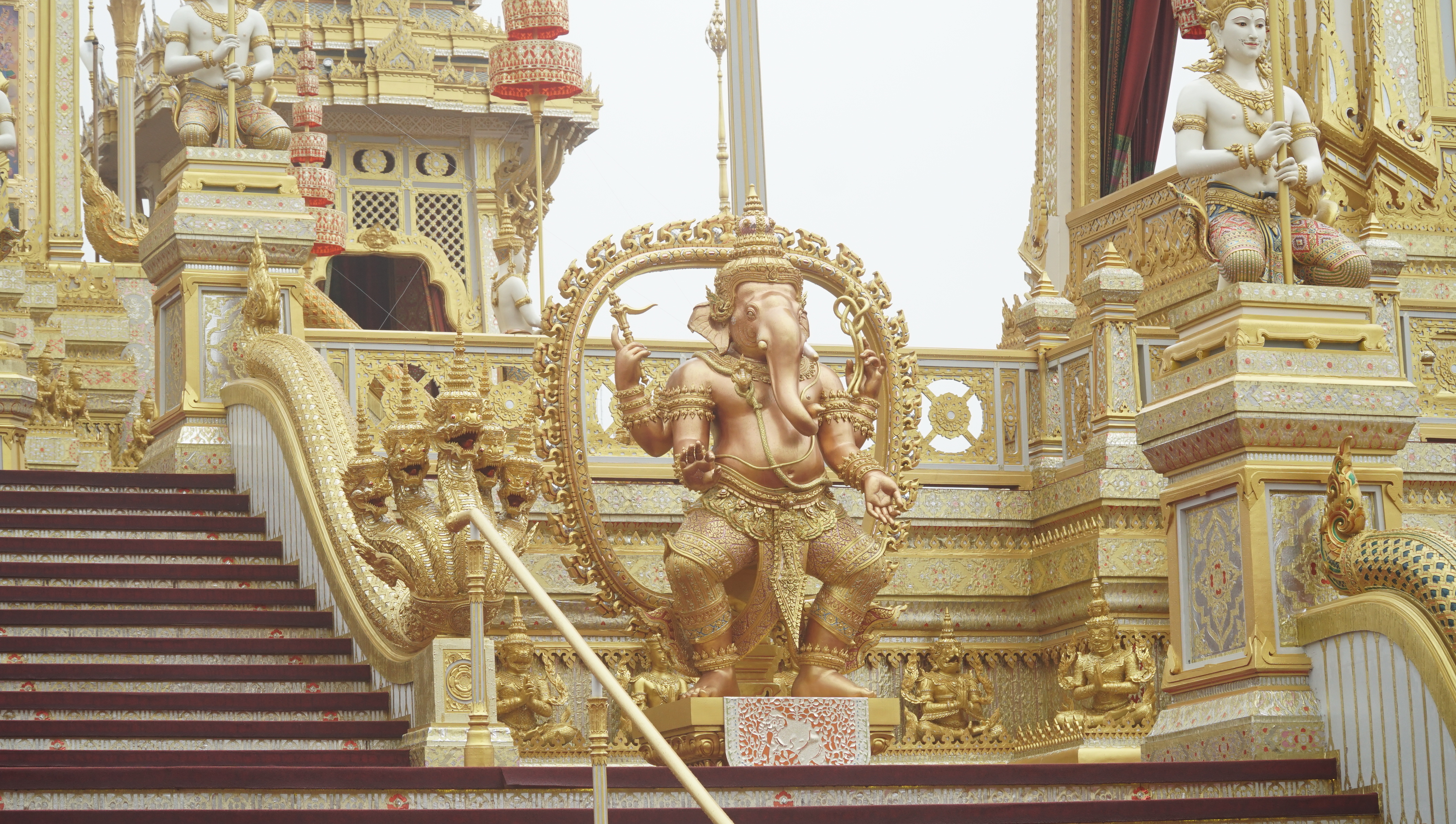
Ganesha statue at the merumat of king Bhumibol Adulyadej

Throughout its history, Thailand has been deeply influenced by Hinduism. Despite the fact that today Thailand is a Buddhist-majority country, many elements of Thai culture and symbolism demonstrate Hindu influences and heritage. Southeast Asia, including what is now Thailand, has been in contact with Hinduism through India for over 2000 years. Indian settlement in Southeast Asia has been ongoing since the 6th century BCE and has continued into the modern era, influenced by various socioeconomic and political factors. Tamil and Gujarati immigrants migrated to Thailand in the late 1800s, working in the gem and textile industries, followed by a larger migration of both Sikhs and Hindus from Punjab in the 1890s.

The popular Thai epic Ramakien is based on the Buddhist Dasaratha Jataka, which is a Thai variant of the Hindu epic Ramayana. The national emblem of Thailand depicts Garuda, the vahana (mount) of Vishnu.

The city Ayutthaya, near Bangkok, is named after Ayodhya, the birthplace of Rama. Numerous rituals derived from Hinduism are preserved in rituals, such as the use of holy strings and pouring of water from conch shells. Furthermore, Hindu-Buddhist deities are worshiped by many Thais, such as Brahma at the famous Erawan Shrine, Trimurti at the famous Trimutri Shrine, and statues of Ganesha, Indra, and Shiva. Reliefs in temple walls, such as the 12th-century Prasat Sikhoraphum near Surin (Thailand), show a dancing Shiva, with smaller images of Parvati, Vishnu, Brahma, and Ganesha.

The Devasathan is a Hindu temple established in 1784 by King Rama I. The temple is the centre of Hindus in Thailand. The royal court Brahmins operate the temple and perform several royal ceremonies per year.

An annual Giant Swing ceremony known as Triyampavai-Tripavai was held in major cities of Thailand until 1935, when it was abolished for safety reasons. The name of the ceremony was derived from the names of two Tamil language Hindu chants: Tiruvempavai and Tiruppavai. It is known that Tamil verses from Tiruvempavai — poet pratu sivalai ("opening the portals of Shiva's home") — were recited at this ceremony, as well as the coronation ceremony of the Thai king. According to T.P. Meenakshisundaram, the name of the festival indicates that Thiruppavai might have been recited as well. The swinging ceremony depicted a legend about how the god created the world. Outside shops, particularly in towns and rural areas, statues of Nang Kwak as the deity of wealth, fortune and prosperity (a form of Lakshmi) are found.

The elite, and the royal household, often employ Brahmins to mark funerals and state ceremonies such as the Royal Ploughing Ceremony to ensure a good harvest. The importance of Hinduism cannot be denied, even though much of the rituals has been combined with Buddhism.

== Tracing Vishnu Sculptures in Thailand ==
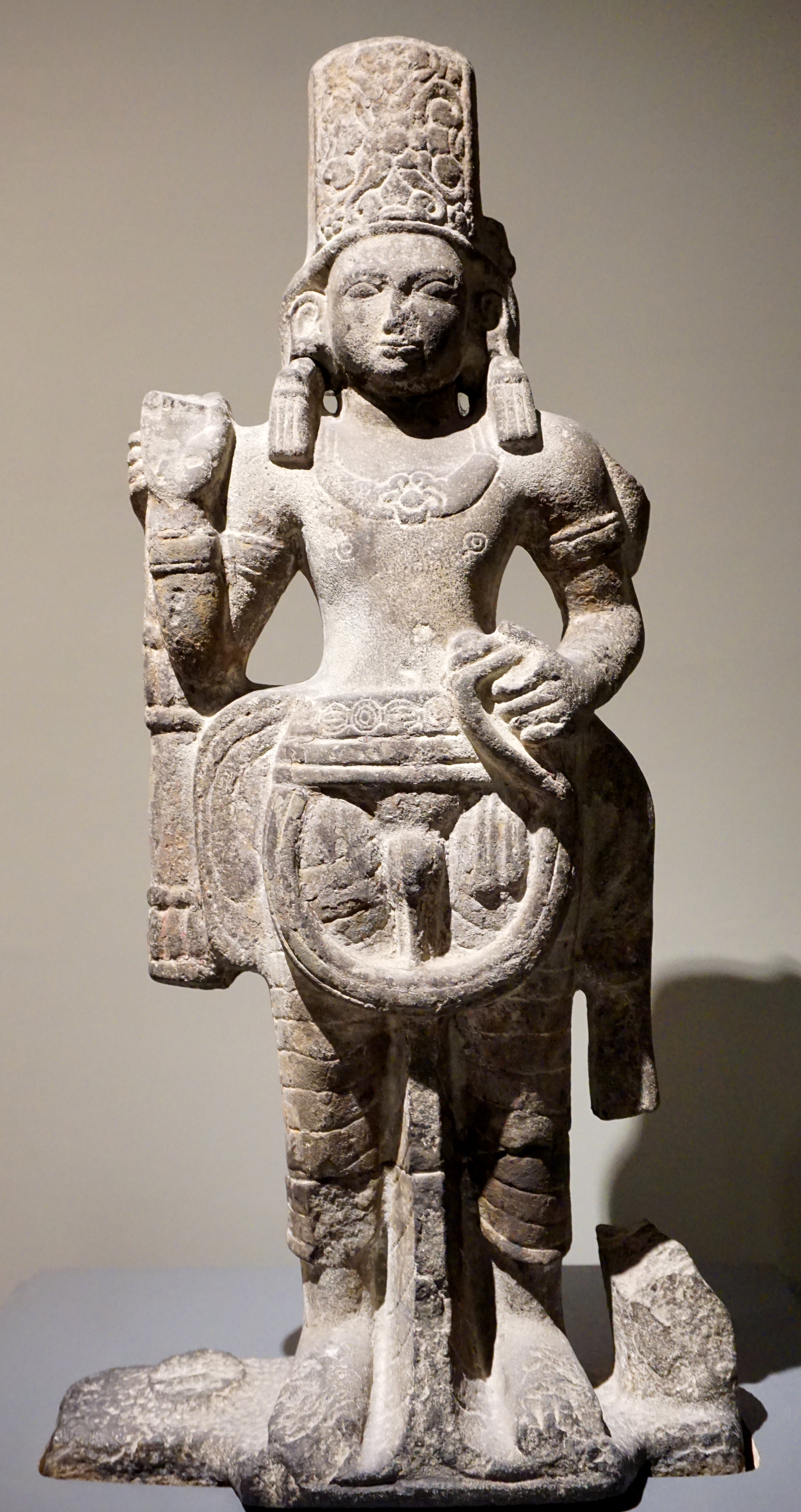
5th century CE, Hindu god Vishnu, Photograph from the National Museum, Bangkok, Thailand.

=== Earliest Vishnu Sculpture Discovered in Thailand ===
Southern and Central Thailand are possibly the earliest regions, where Vaishnavism flourished in the whole of Southeast Asia. Several sculptures of Vishnu are discovered from the earliest period. These smaller-than-human-sized sculptures are stylistically comparable to Mathura and Amaravati schools of Indian Art.

=== Second Phase of Vishnu Sculpture from Central Thailand, 7th-8th centuries CE ===
The human-sized sculpture of the second phase Vishnu with Pallava influence was discovered in Sri Mahosot in Central Thailand. Vishnu is attired in a plain cylindrical crown along with a transparent lower garment. The style of the sculpture shares a similarity with the ones discovered in Southern Thailand.

=== Sculptures of Vishnu and Krishna discovered from Sri Thep ===
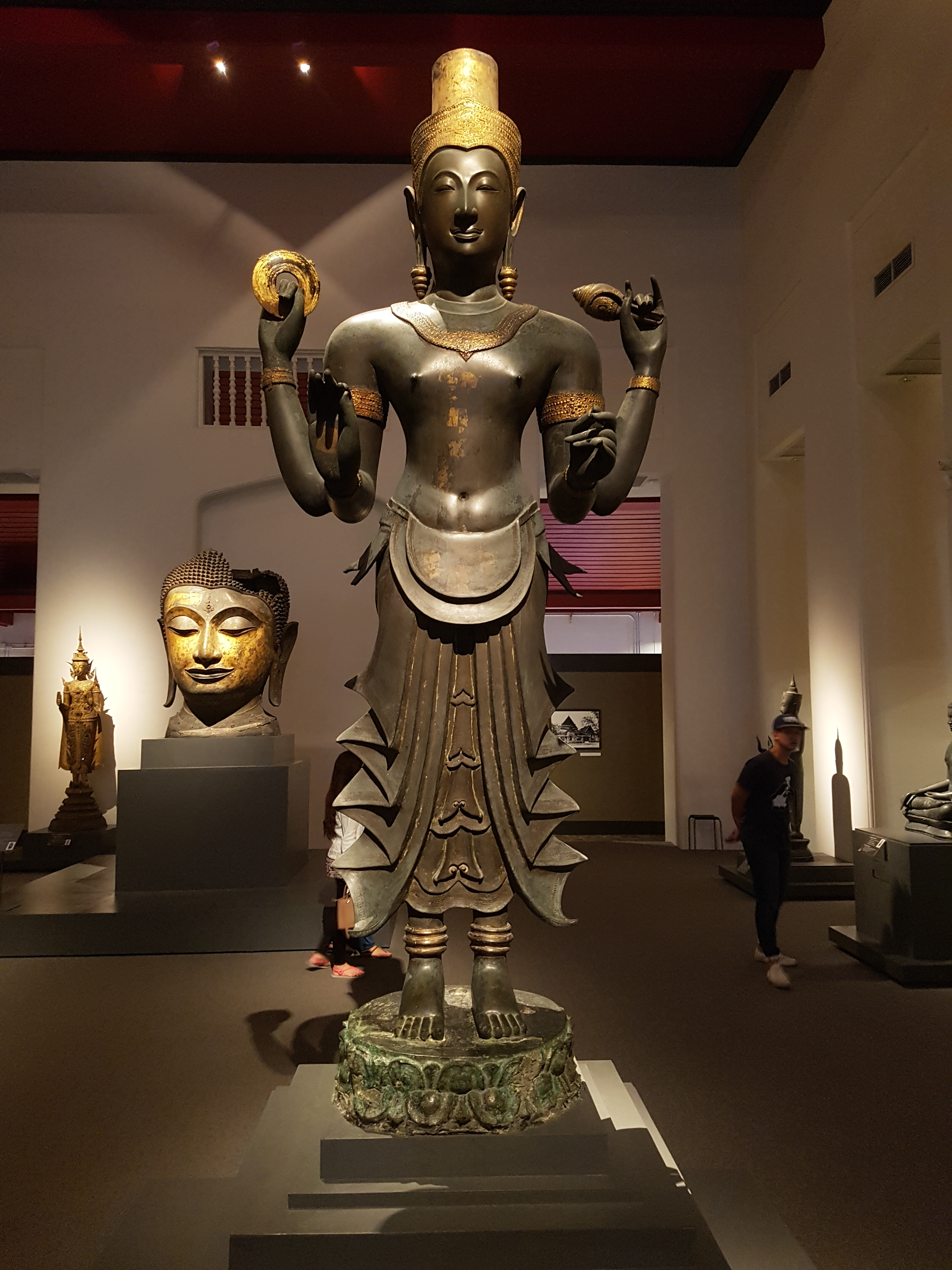
The Sukhothai Vishnu at the Bangkok National Museum, circa 14th century, found at the Sukhothai Historical Park.

Sri Thep is one of the most important Dvaravati cities in Central Thailand which yields several stone sculptures of Vaishnavism. Vishnu and Krishna are the most common finds. Vishnu stands in the posture of Tribhanga, Krishna is portrayed with the left band lifting Mount Govardhana.

=== Four-armed Vishnu, 14th century CE ===
After the 13th century CE, when the Thais converted to Theravada Buddhism, kings tried to claim themselves as the incarnation of Vishnu. A Vishnu bronze image was moulded for Sukhothai's royal private worship. The image smiles with serenity, similar to Sukhothai Buddha image.

== Tracing Shaivism in Thailand ==
Shiva is the mighty god of destruction of the universe, and sins. Shaivism, which originated in South India, was transmitted to the southern and central parts of Thailand. This occurred during the 6th-10th century A.D.

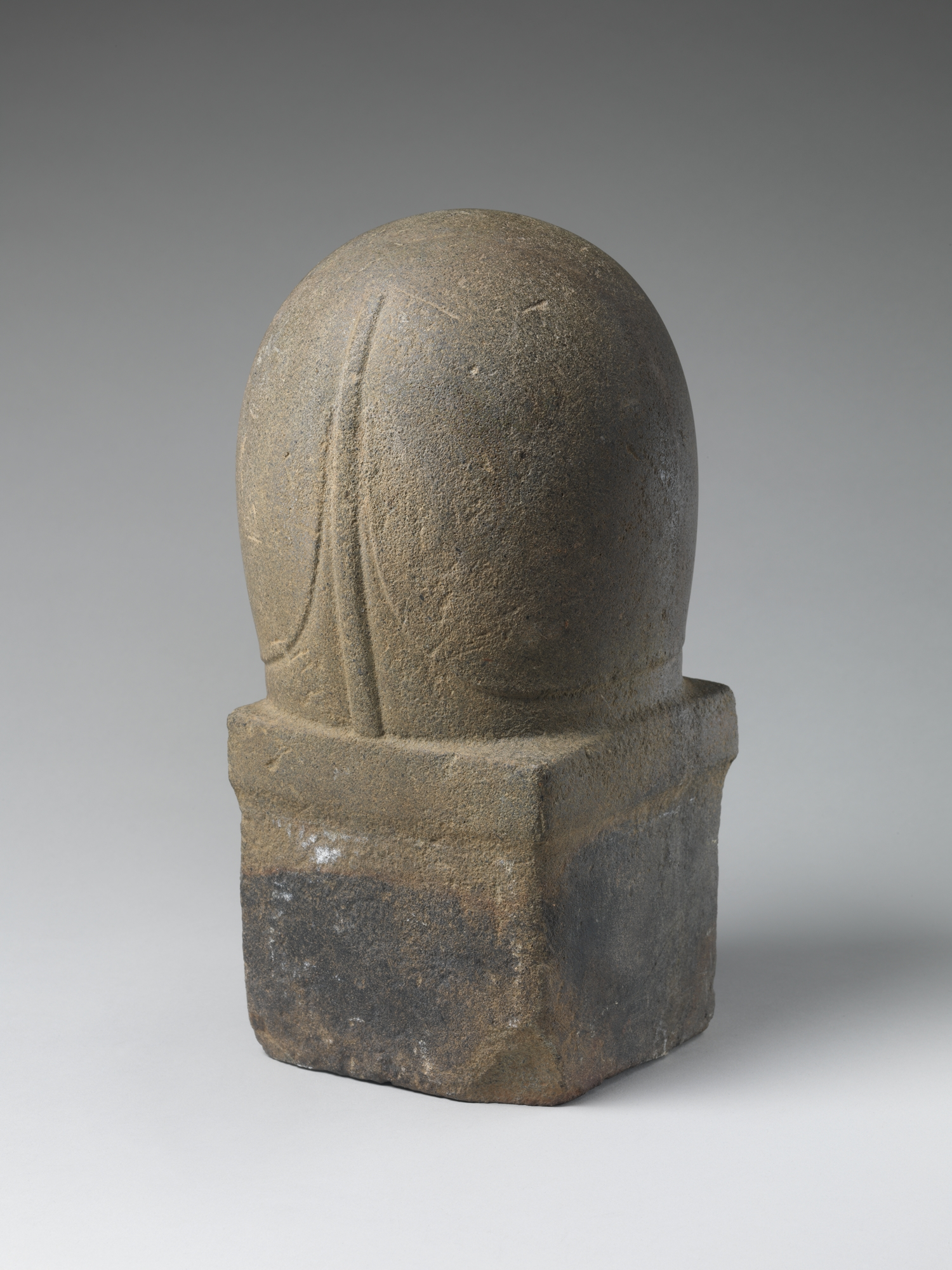
Southern Thailand; Lingam; Sculpture.

Lord Shiva is manifested in various forms. Among them the most popular one is that of the lingam, in the shape of men's genital organs. It depicts the unison of the male and female energies, which created the entire universe according to Hindu thought. Several forms of Shiva Lingam have been found in Southern Thailand. One has the Lord Shiva's face. This is known as the Mukha Lingam. Similarly, a gold lingam, belonging to a hermit's private collection, has been discovered at a cave in the region. A lingam shaped stone known as the Swayambhulingam has also been discovered.

== Thai Brahmin community ==
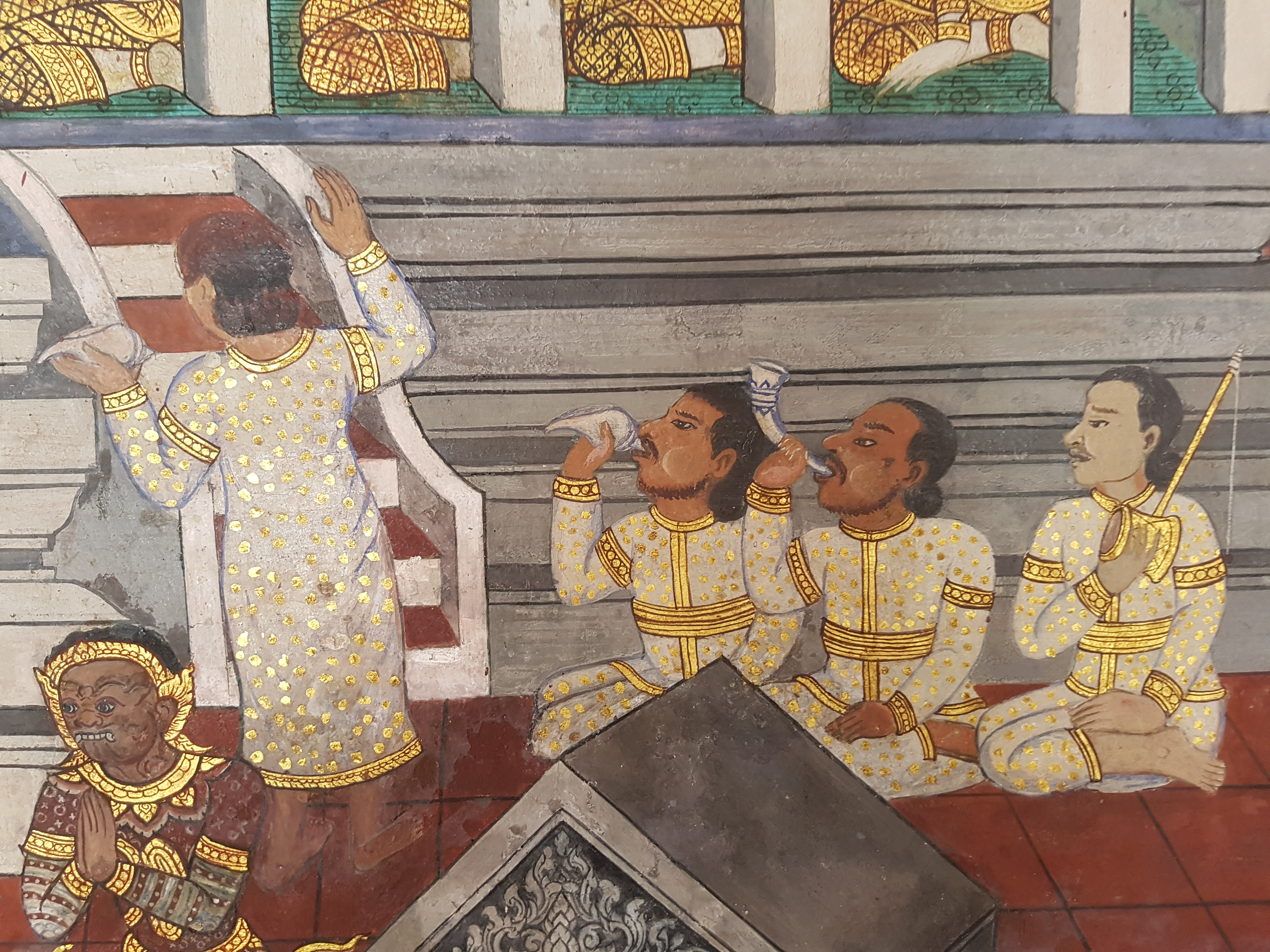
Royal Brahmins performing a ceremony, mural painting from Temple of Emerald Buddha

Thailand has two ethnic Thai Brahmin communities - Brahm Luang (Royal Brahmins) and Brahm Chao Baan (folk Brahmins). All ethnic Thai Brahmins are Buddhist by religion, who still worship Hindu Gods. The Brahm Luang (Royal Brahmins) mainly perform royal ceremonies of the Thai monarch, including crowning of the king. They belong to the long family bloodline of Brahmins in Thailand, who originated from Tamil Nadu. The folk Brahmins are the category of Brahmins who are not from a lineage of priests. Generally, these Brahmins have less knowledge about the rituals and ceremonies. Apart from this there are also Indian Brahmins from India who migrated to Thailand more recently.

Brahmins once conducted the royal ceremony in other Southeast Asian countries as well. The rituals were reinstated in Cambodia after the overthrow of the Khmer Rouge. The Brahmins of Myanmar have lost their role due to the abolition of monarchy.

Historian Damrong Rajanubhab has mentioned about three kind of Brahmins, from Nakhòn Sī Thammarāt, from Phatthalung, and those who originated from Cambodia.

== Indian Hindus ==
During the Sukhothai and Ayutthaya periods, evidence of the presence of sizable number of Indians in the Thai court is described by a number of western travelers. However most of the contemporary Indians came to Thailand after 1920, and during the first half of the 19th century.

The Mariamman Temple, Bangkok is the first temple built in the South Indian architectural style. It was built in 1879 by Vaithi Padayatchi, a Tamil Hindu immigrant.

== Demographics ==
Historical Population
Year	Pop.	±%
2005	52,631	—
2010	41,808	−20.6%
2015	22,110	−47.1%
2018	13,886	−37.2%
2020	84,400	+507.8%

Year	Percent	Increase
2005	0.09%	-
2010	0.06%	▼ -0.03%
2015	0.03%	▼ -0.03%
2018	0.02%	▼ -0.01%
2020	0.10%	▲ +0.09%

According to the 2005 Thai census, there are 52,631 Hindus living in Thailand, making up just 0.09% of the total population. In the 2010 census, that number decreased to 41,808 Hindus in Thailand, constituting 0.06% of the population. In the 2015 census, this population decreased to 22,110, or 0.03%.

However, the PEW Research data found that Hinduism constituted 0.1% of the Thai population in 2014 and is increasing in Thailand as a percentage of the country's population. The PEW Research data reports that the Hindu population is expected to increase from 0.1% in 2014 to 0.2% by 2050.

Future Hindu population of Thailand
Year	Total Population	Hindu population	Percentage
2014	68,438,748	68,439	0.1%
2050	65,940,494	131,881	0.2%

== Hindu sites in Thailand ==
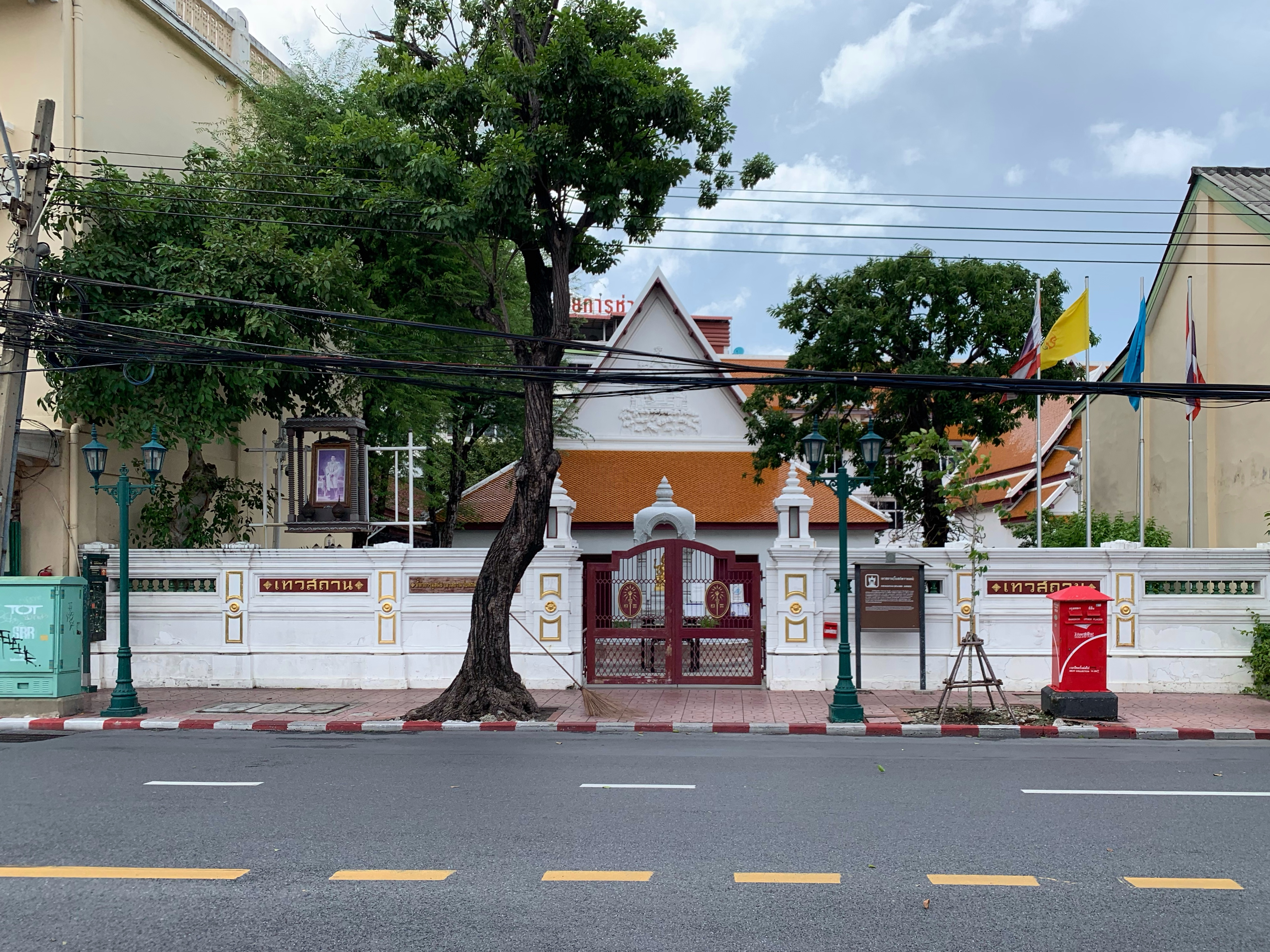
The front gate of the Devasathan built in 1784, the official center of Hinduism in Bangkok

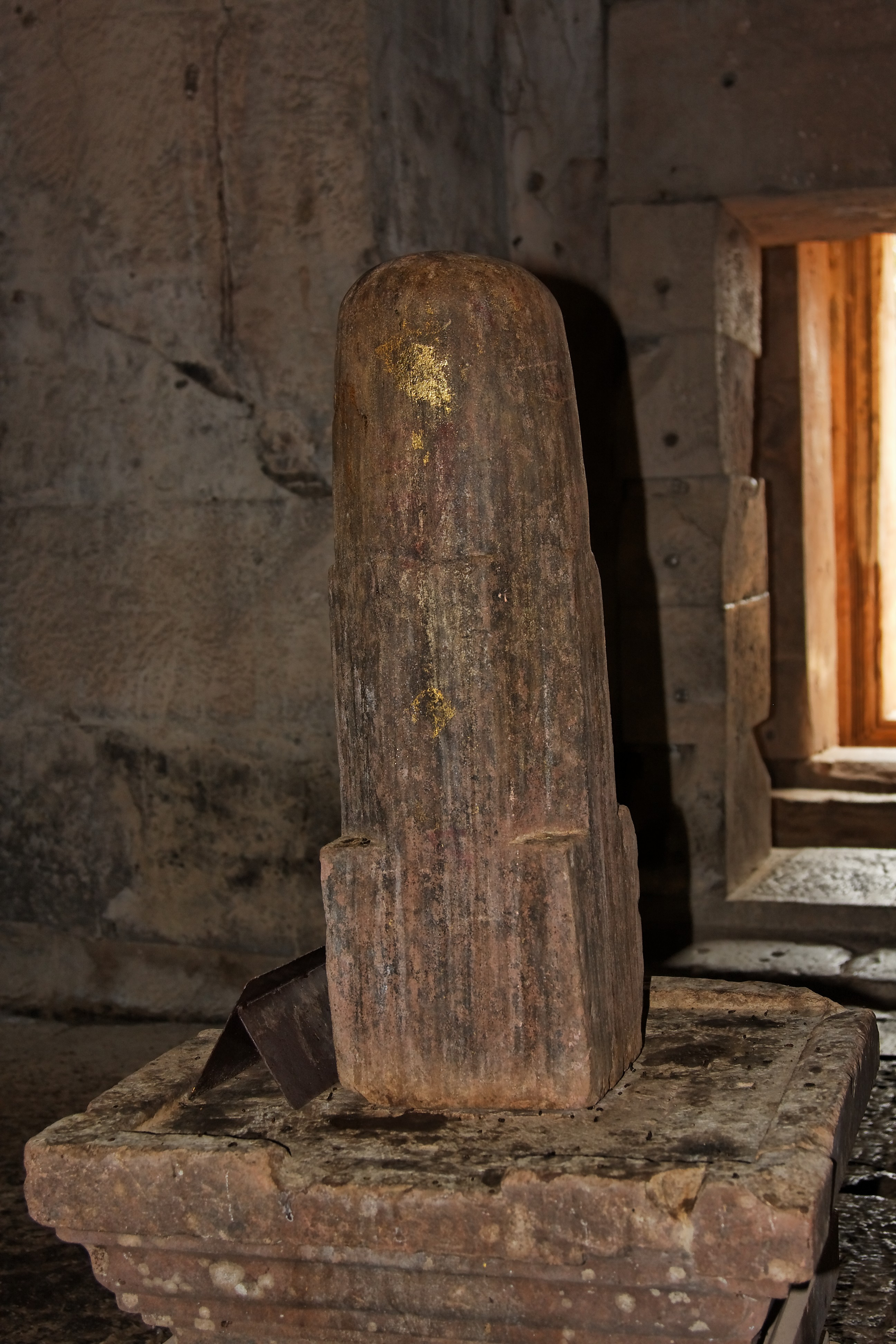
The Lingam at Phanom Rung in Buriram, showing remnants of the Khmer Empire in Thailand.

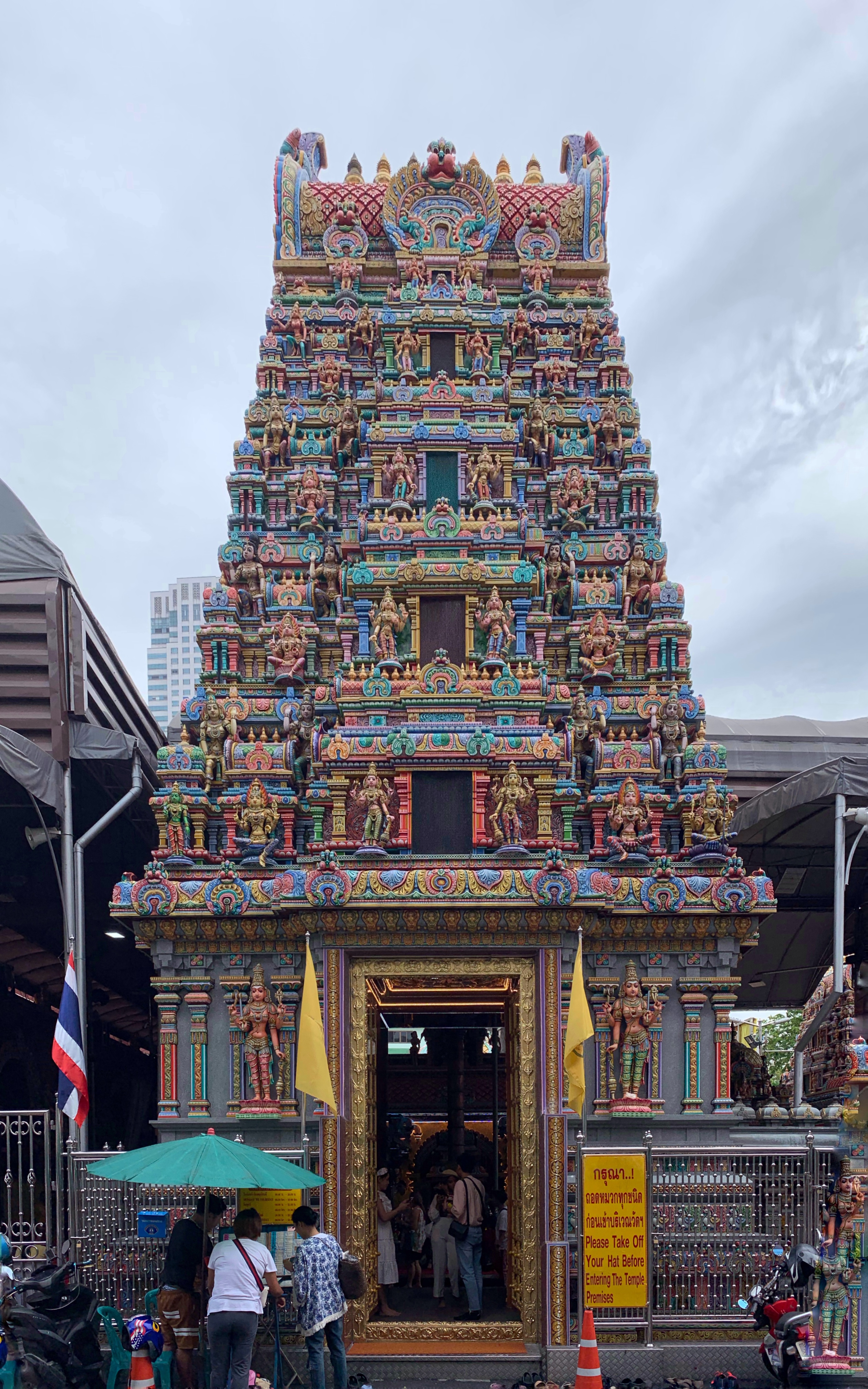
Mariamman Temple, Bangkok in Bangrak, Bangkok was built in 1879.

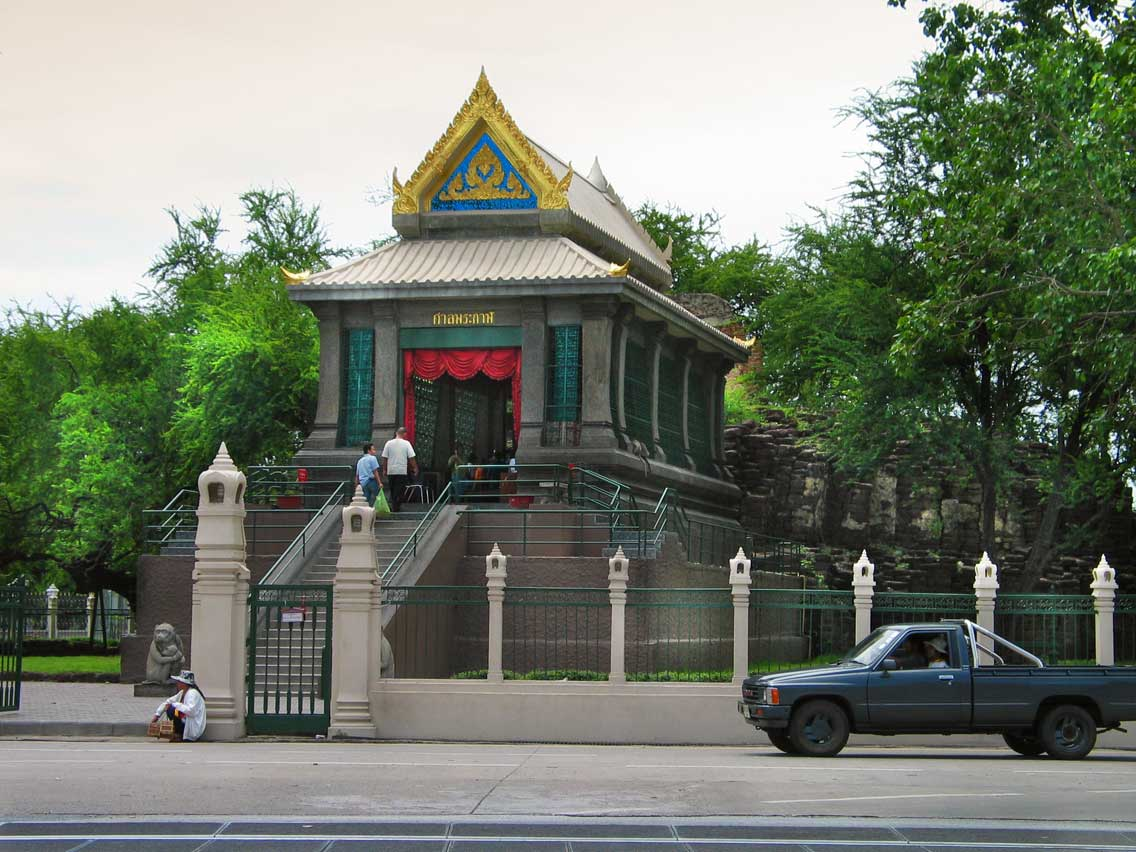
San Phra Kan is a shrine which was dedicated to Hindu God Vishnu in Lop Buri.

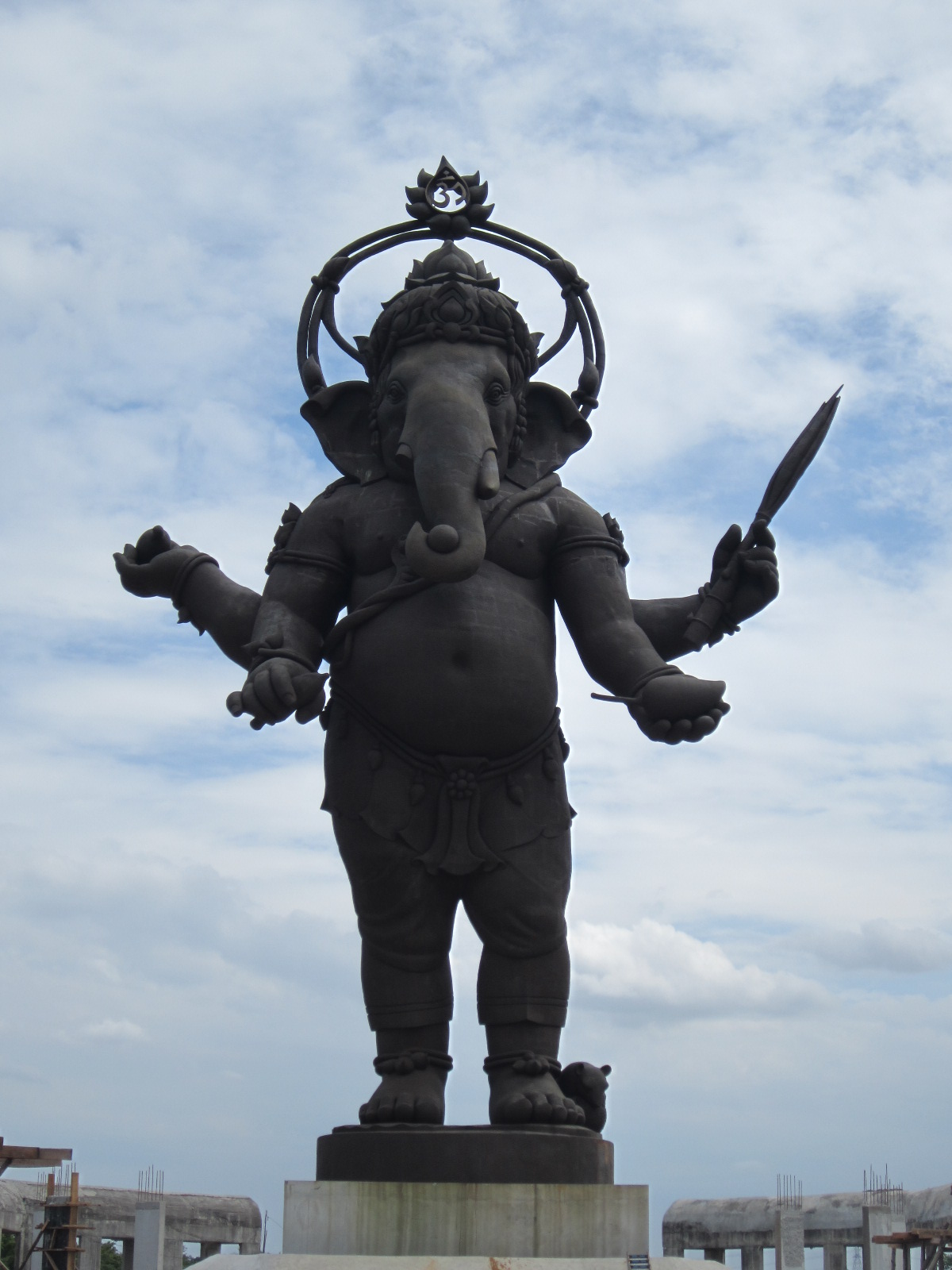
Bronze statue of Ganesha at the Khlong Khuean Ganesh International Park, Khlong Khuean, Chachoengsao.

== See also ==
- Religion in Thailand
- Hinduism in Cambodia
- Hinduism in Myanmar
- Hinduism in Southeast Asia
- Phruttibas Brahmins
