= McDaniel =

McDaniel is a surname. It may refer to the following people:

- Barry McDaniel (1930–2018), American operatic baritone
- Chris McDaniel (born 1972), American attorney and politician
- Clara McDaniel (born 1948), American blues singer and songwriter
- Clint McDaniel (born 1972), American basketball player
- David McDaniel (1939–1977), American science fiction writer
- Devon McDaniel, Jamaican politician
- Ellas McDaniel (1928–2008), better known by the stage name Bo Diddley, American guitarist and singer
- Etta McDaniel (1890–1946), American actress, sister of Hattie and Sam McDaniel
- George A. McDaniel (1885–1944), American actor and singer
- Hattie McDaniel (1895–1952), American actress, first African-American Oscar winner, sister of Etta and Sam McDaniel
- Henry Dickerson McDaniel (1836–1926), American politician
- Jacobbi McDaniel (born 1989), American football player
- James McDaniel (born 1958), American actor
- Jeffrey McDaniel (born 1967), American poet
- Lindy McDaniel (1935–2020), American baseball player
- Lurlene McDaniel (born 1944), American author
- Matthew McDaniel (20th/21st century), American human rights activist
- Mel McDaniel (1942–2011), American singer and music artist
- Michael McDaniel (professor), chair of the Council of the Australian Institute of Aboriginal and Torres Strait Islander Studies (AIATSIS) from 2017 to 2019
- Michael A. McDaniel, American psychologist
- Mike McDaniel (born 1983), American football coach, former head coach of the Miami Dolphins NFL team
- Mildred McDaniel (1933–2004), American athlete
- Orlando McDaniel (1960–2020), American football player
- Randall McDaniel (born 1964), American football player
- Ronna McDaniel (born 1973), American politician
- Sam McDaniel (1886–1962), American actor, brother of Etta and Hattie McDaniel
- Sam McDaniel (basketball) (born 1995), Australian basketball player
- Scott McDaniel (born 1965), American comics artist
- Terry McDaniel (born 1965), American football player
- Wahoo McDaniel, ring name of Edward McDaniel (1938–2002), American football player and professional wrestler
- William Roberts McDaniel (1861–1942), American academic
- Xavier McDaniel (born 1963), American basketball player

== See also ==
- McDaniels
