= Akha people =

Ethnic group in Southeast Asia

Akha
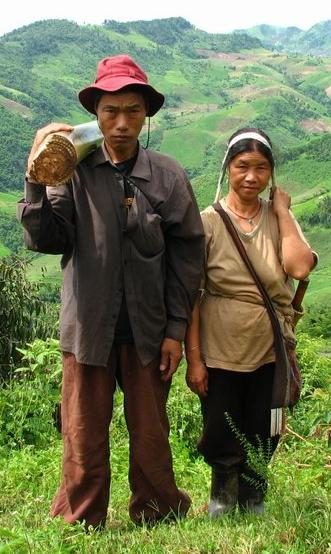
- Man (left) and woman (right) of the Akha people. The man is carrying the stem of a banana plant, which will be fed to their pigs.

Total population
- 680,000

Regions with significant populations
- Mainland Southeast Asia and Yunnan (China)
- China: 240,000
- Laos: 112,979
- Thailand: 80,000

Languages
- Akha, Lao, Thai

Religion
- Akhazah (Animism), Buddhism, Christianity

Related ethnic groups
- Hani; Hmong; Karen; Lahu; Lisu

The Akha are an ethnic group who live in small villages at higher elevations in the mountains of Laos, Myanmar, Thailand, Vietnam, and Yunnan Province in China. They made their way from China into Southeast Asia during the early 20th century. Civil war in Burma and Laos resulted in an increased flow of Akha immigrants and there are now 80,000 people living in Thailand's northern provinces of Chiang Mai and Chiang Rai.

The Akha speak Akha, a language in the Loloish (Yi) branch of the Tibeto-Burman family. The Akha language is closely related to Lisu and it is thought that it was the Akha who once ruled the Baoshan and Tengchong plains in Yunnan before the invasion of the Ming dynasty in 1644.

== Origins ==
Flag of the Akha People in Thailand

Scholars agree with the Akha that they originated in China; they disagree, however, about whether the original homeland was the Tibetan borderlands, as the Akha claim, or farther south and east in Yunnan Province, the northernmost residence of present-day Akha. The historically documented existence of relations with the Shan prince of Kengtung indicates that Akha were in eastern Burma as early as the 1860s. They first entered Thailand from Burma at the turn of the 20th-century, many having fled the decades-long civil war in Burma.

== Population distribution and Indigenous status ==
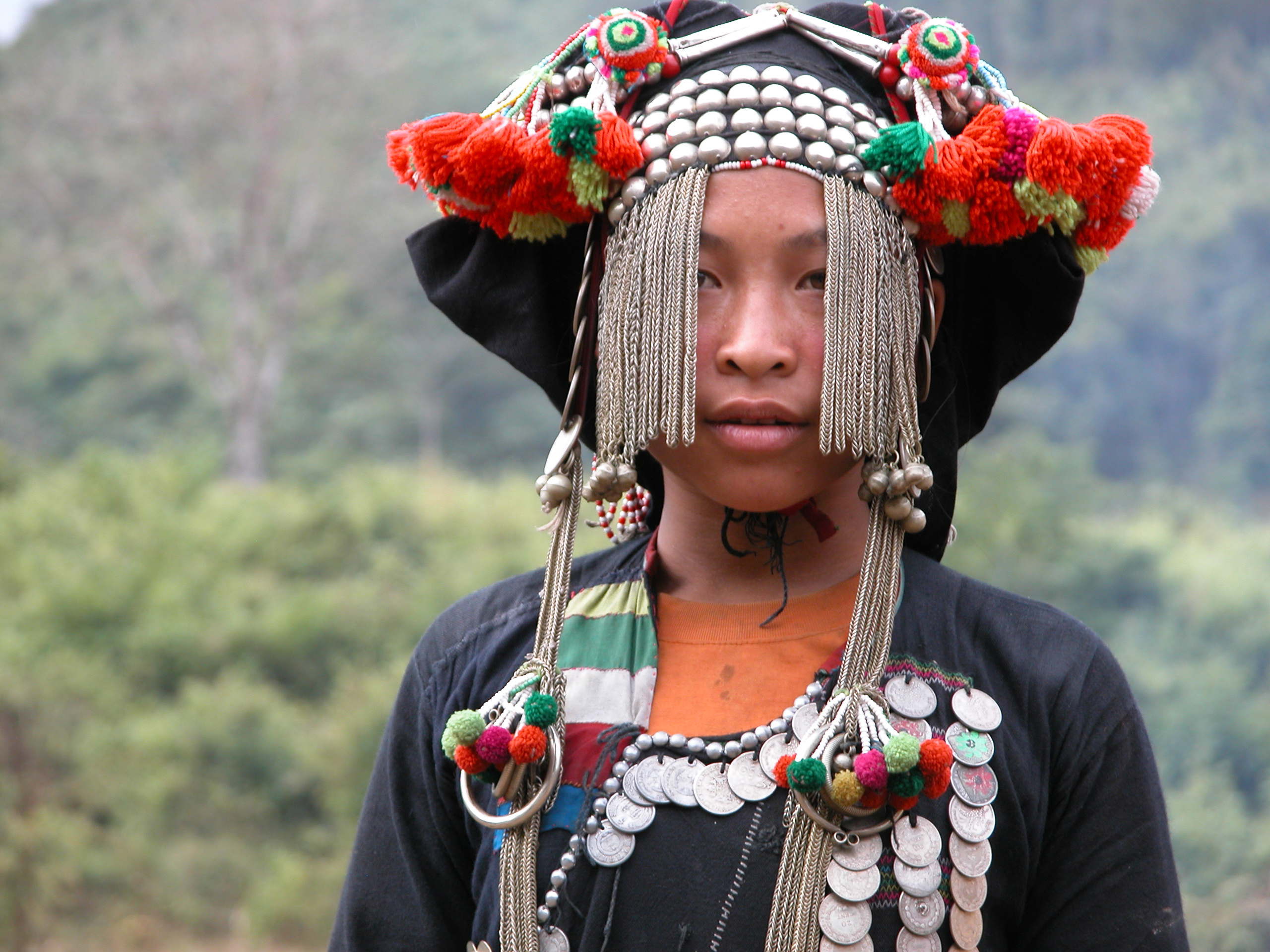
An Akha girl in Laos

Akha live in villages on the mountains of south-western China, western Laos, eastern Myanmar, Northern Thailand, and north-western Vietnam. In all these countries they are an ethnic minority. The population of the Akha today is roughly 400,000. A decline in village size in Thailand since the 1930s has been noted and attributed to the deteriorating ecological and economic situation in the mountains.

The Akha are often classified by the Chinese government as part of the Hani, an official national minority. The Akha are closely related to the Hani, but consider themselves a distinct group and often resist being subsumed under that identity. In Thailand, they are classified as one of the six hill tribes, a term used for all of the various tribal peoples who migrated from China and Tibet over the past few centuries and who now inhabit the dense forests on the borders between Thailand, Laos, and Burma. Few Akha in Thailand are citizens and most are registered as aliens. There is an oft cited lack of political or state infrastructure to address Akha, or any other indigenous issues in Thailand.

The Akha are not always treated or addressed as equals by the people whose countries they now inhabit. Speakers of Tai languages in Myanmar and Thailand refer to them as "gaw" or "ekaw" (ikaw/ikho), terms which the Akha view as derogatory. In Laos the colloquial term used by Tai speakers to refer to the Akha is "kho" (ko), often prefaced by the word "kha", which in the past was used to refer to all upland (typically Mon-Khmer) groups.

== Language ==
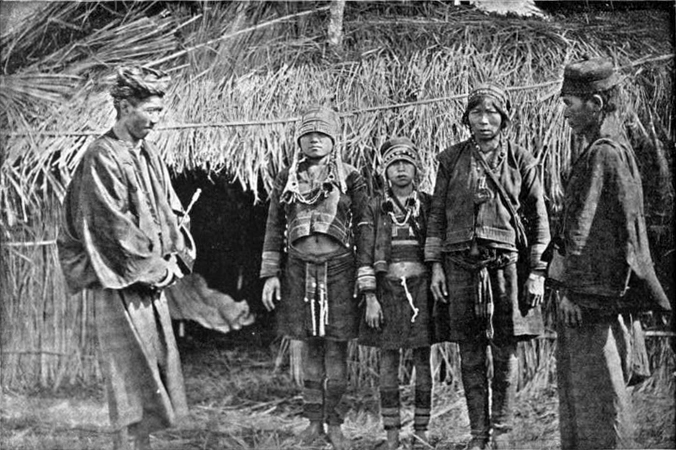
Akha women, c. 1900

Called "Avkavdawv," meaning "Akha language," by its native speakers, Akha is a tonal language in the Lolo/Yi branch of the Sino-Tibetan family. The vast majority of Akha speakers can understand the jeu g’oe ("jer way") dialect spoken in southern China, Thailand, and Myanmar. Some basic and systematic variations in regional dialects of Akha are discussed by Paul Lewis in his Akha-English-Thai Dictionary. Very few dialects of Akha do not share mutual intelligibility. The Akha have no written language, but there are several competing scripts that have been written by missionaries and other foreigners.

== Akha villages and culture ==
The modern and tourism-based Akha village of Pha Hi (ผาฮี้) in Mae Sai district, Chiang Rai province, Thailand: many cafés, restaurants, coffee bean factories, and homestays can be seen alongsides villagers' houses

Due to rapid social and economic changes in the regions the Akha inhabit, particularly the introduction of Western modes of capitalism, attempts to continue many of the traditional aspects of Akha life are increasingly difficult. Despite these challenges, Akha people practice many elements of their traditional culture with much success.

Akha society lacks a strict system of social class and is considered egalitarian. Respect is typically accorded with age and experience. Ties of patrilineal kinship and marriage alliance bind the Akha within and between communities. Village structures may vary widely from the strictly traditional to Westernized, depending on their proximity to modern towns. Like many of the hill tribes, the Akha build their villages at higher elevations in the mountains.

Akha dwellings are traditionally constructed of logs, bamboo, and thatch and are of two types: "low houses", built on the ground, and "high houses", built on stilts. The semi-nomadic Akha, at least those who have not been moved to permanent village sites, typically do not build their houses as permanent residences and will often move their villages. Some say that this gives the dwellings a deceptively fragile and flimsy appearance, although they are quite well-built as proved over generations.

Entrances to all Akha villages are fitted with a wooden gate adorned with elaborate carvings on both sides depicting imagery of men and women. It is known as a "spirit gate". It marks the division between the inside of the village, the domain of man and domesticated animals, and the outside, the realm of spirits and wildlife. The gates function to ward off evil spirits and to entice favorable ones. Carvings can be seen on the roofs of the villager's houses as a second measure to control the flow of spirits.

Houses are segregated by gender, with specific areas for men as well as a common space. This divide is said to mimic the function of the gate. Another important feature found in most Akha villages is a tall four-posted village swing which is used in an annual ancestor offering related to the fertility of rice. The swing is built annually by an elder called a dzoeuh mah.

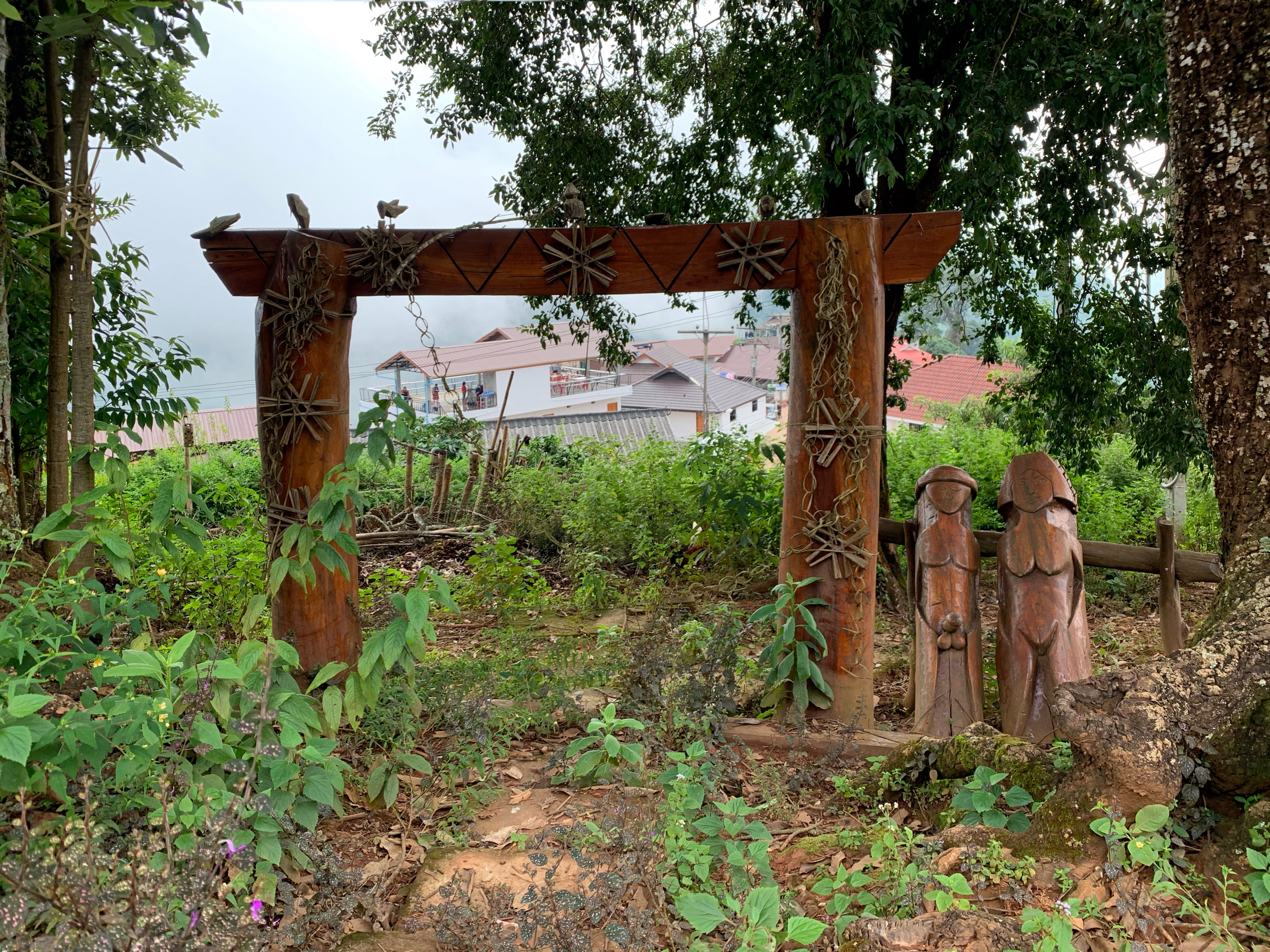
An Akha "Spirit Gate" (Ghost Gate) in Ban Pha Hi, Chiang Rai Province, Thailand

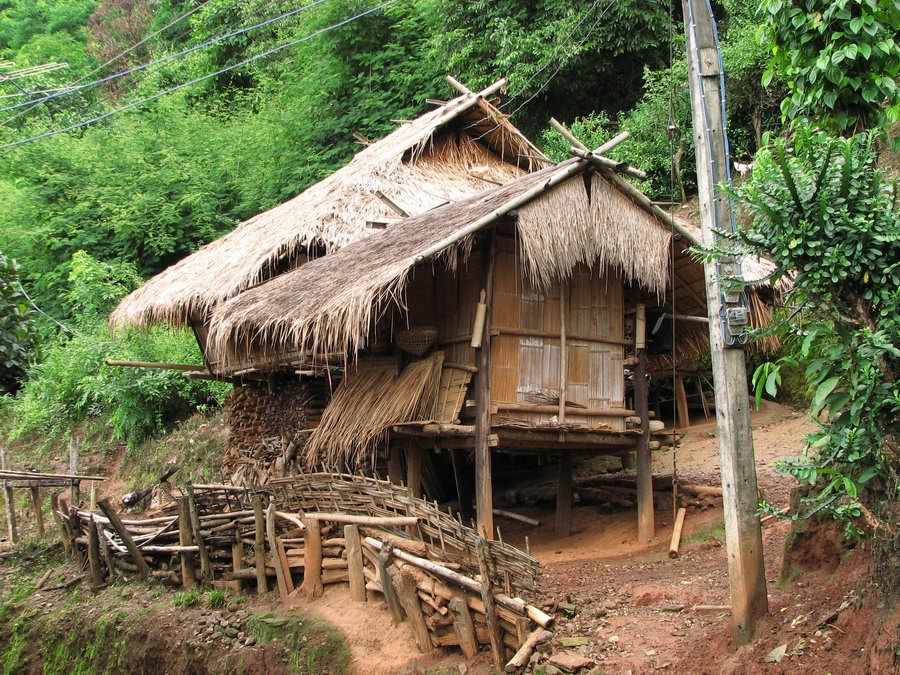
Akha hut

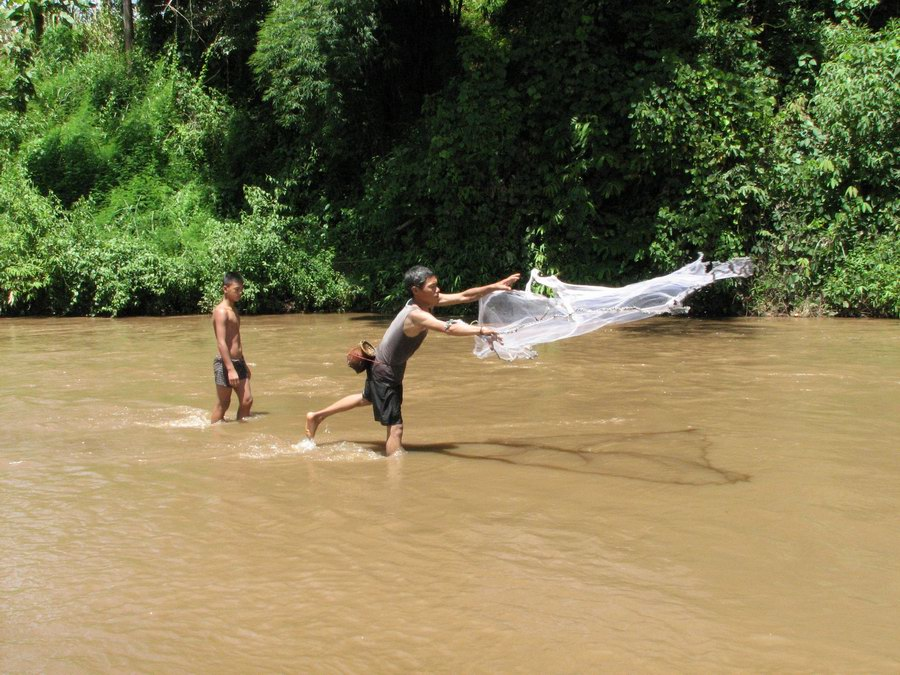
Akha fishing

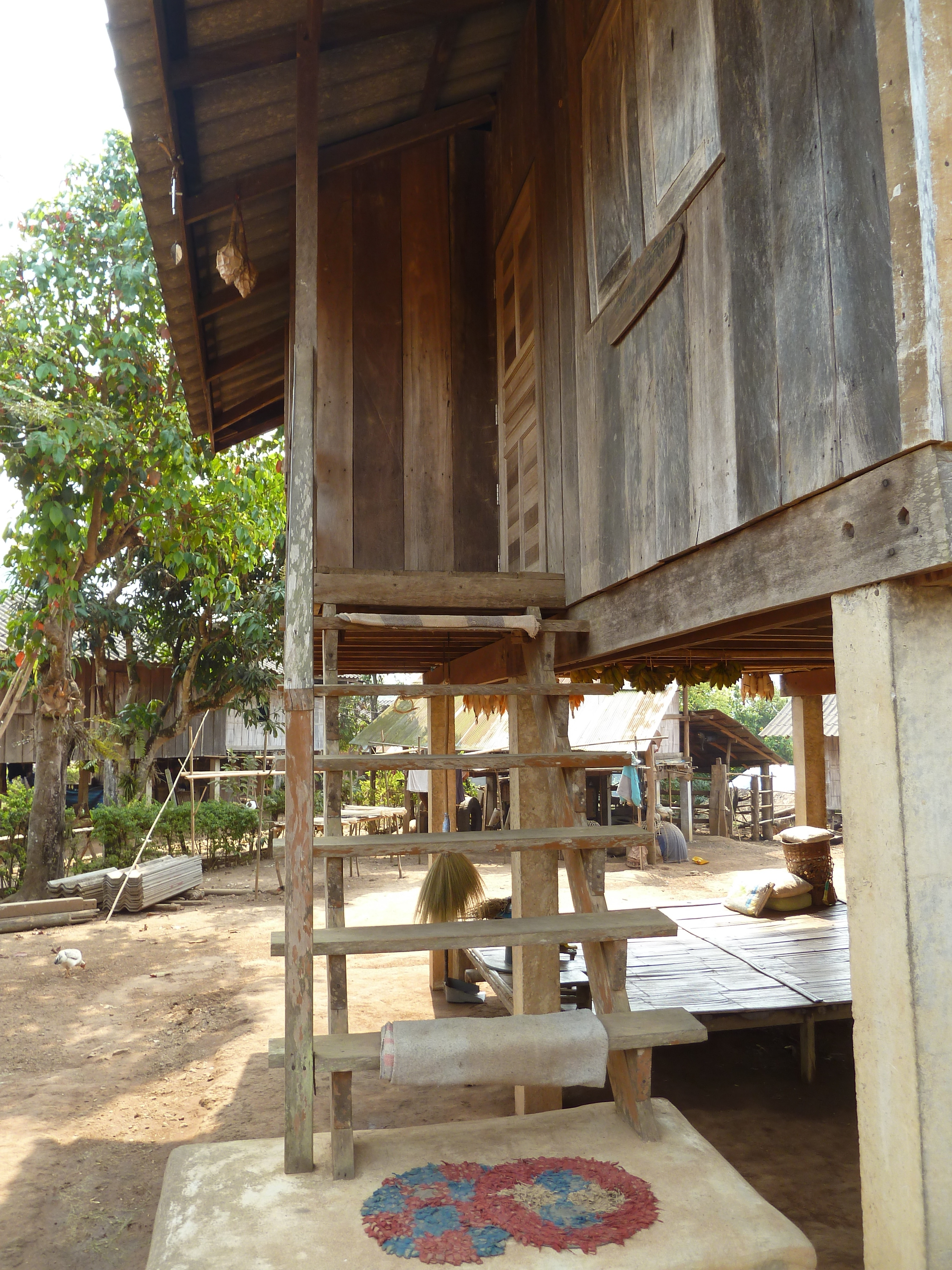
Akha, Chiang Rai Province

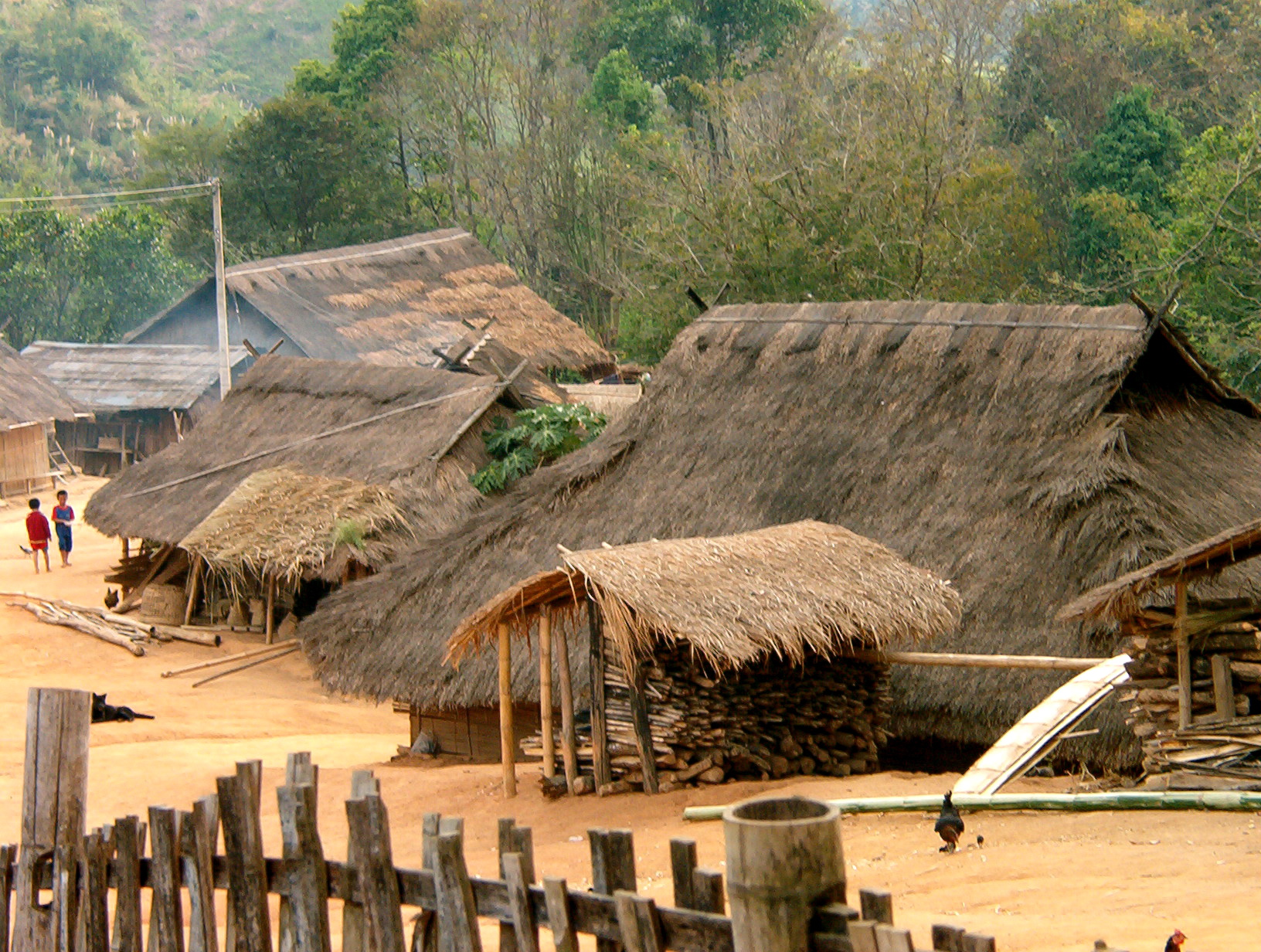
An Akha village, with traditional thatched roofs, in northern Thailand

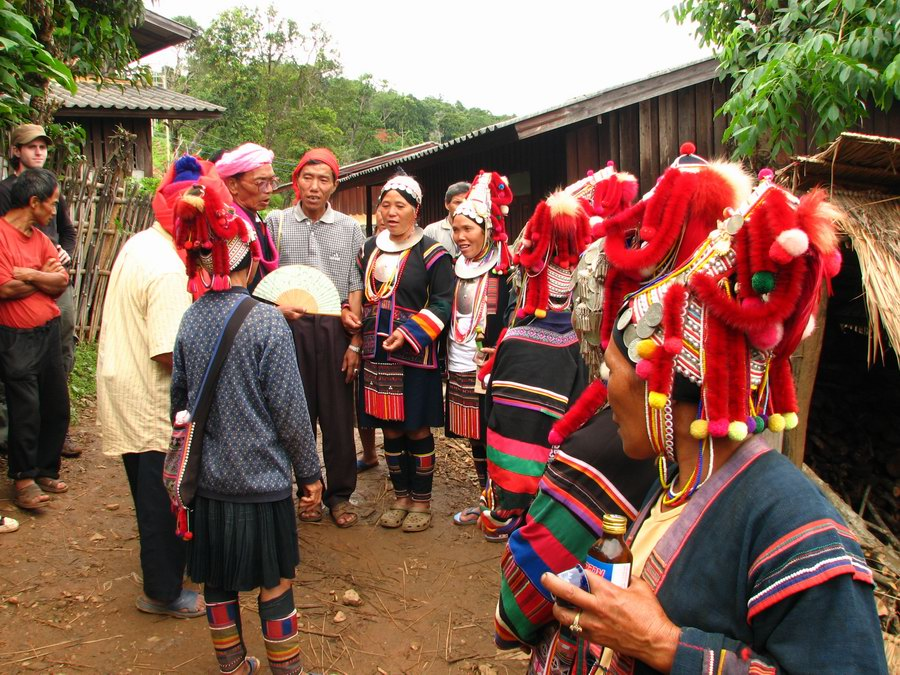
Akha funeral ceremony

=== Traditional economy ===
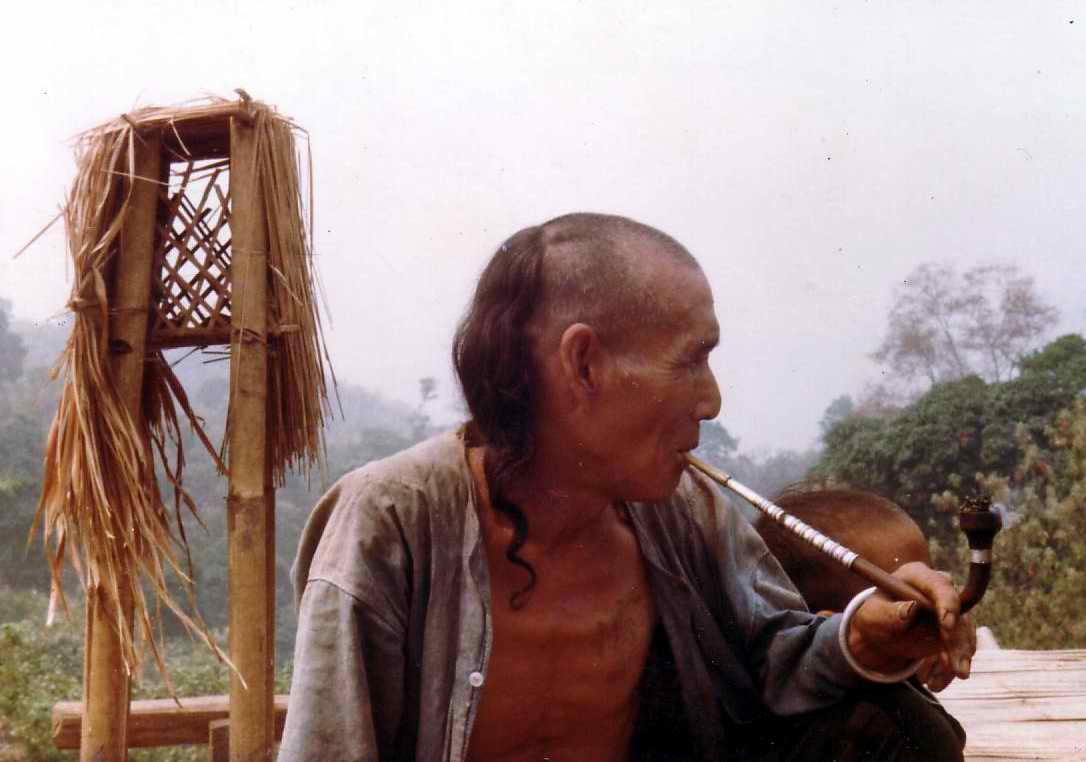
Akha man with opium pipe (1979)

The traditional form of subsistence for the Akha people has been, and remains, agriculture. The Akha grow a variety of crops including soybeans and vegetables. Rice is the most significant crop and is prominent in much of Akha culture and ritual. Most Akha plant dry-land rice, which depends solely on rainfall for moisture, but in some villages irrigation has been built to water paddy fields. Historically, some Akha villages grew opium, but production diminished after the Thai government banned its cultivation.

The Akha have traditionally employed slash-and-burn agriculture, in which new fields are cleared by burning or cutting down forests and woodlands. In such a system, there is usually no market for land. Rights to land are considered traditional and established over many generations. This type of agriculture has contributed to the Akha's semi-nomadic status as villages move to clear new farmland with each successive burn cycle. The Thai government has forbidden this practice, citing its detrimental effects on the environment. The Akha have adapted to new types of subsistence farming, but the quality of their land has suffered as they are no longer allowed to expand onto new plots. In many cases, chemical fertilizers are the only option for re-fertilizing the land.

In addition to their agricultural work, the Akha raise livestock including pigs, chickens, ducks, goats, cattle, and water buffalo to supplement their diets and to use for their secondary products. Children usually herd the animals. Akha women gather plants from the surrounding forests as well as eggs and insects the Akha will occasionally eat or use for medicinal purposes. The women and the men will often fish in the local lakes and streams. Some villages construct bee gums with the hope that a colony will nest there and their honey subsequently harvested.

The Akha are skilled hunters. Hunting is a male activity and a very popular one. It is a favorite pastime and a means of obtaining food. The barking deer is, perhaps, their favorite prey. Guns obtained from trading in the larger towns have begun to replace the use of crossbows in hunting.

=== Belief system ===
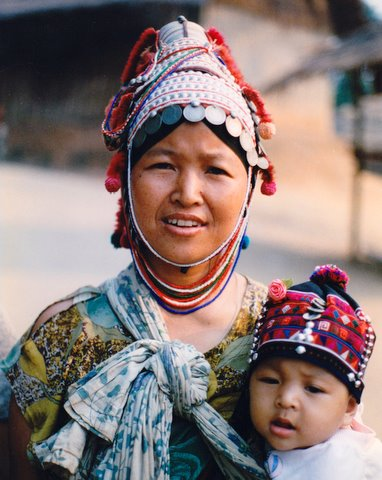
Akha woman with child (Thailand)

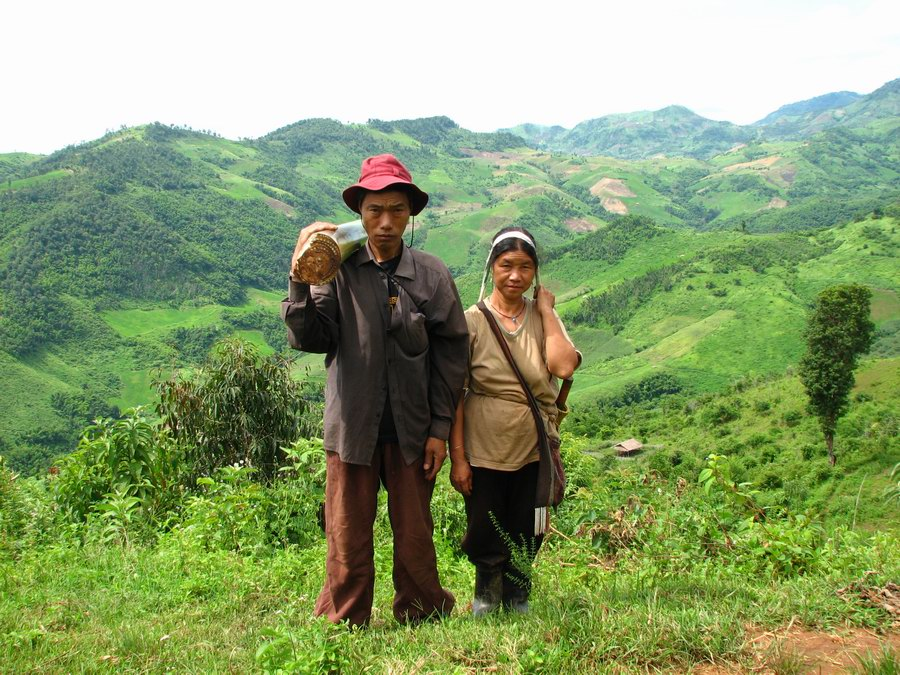
Husband carrying the stem of a banana plant, to be fed to pigs

Akha religion—zahv—is often described as a mixture of animism and ancestor worship that emphasizes the Akha connection with the land and their place in the natural world and cycles. Although Akha beliefs and rituals involve all of these elements, the Akha often reject the casual categorization of their practices as such saying it simplifies and reduces its meaning. The Akha way emphasizes rituals in everyday life and stresses strong family ties. Akha ethnicity is closely tied to the Akha religion. It might be said that to be considered an Akha ethnically by other Akhas is to practice the Akha religion.

The annual ritual cycle consists of nine or twelve ancestor offerings, rice rituals, and other rites such as the building of the village gates. Many Akha rituals and festivals serve to seek "blessings" (guivlahav) from ancestors, which are according to the Encyclopedia of World Cultures, "...fertility and health in people, rice, and domesticated animals." Akha beliefs are passed down through generations by oral recantation. The Akha believe that the being who created earth and life gave Akha the "Akha Zang" (Akha Way), their guidelines for life. Akhas believe that spirits and people were born of the same mother and lived together until a quarrel led to their separation, upon which spirits went into the forest and people remained in the villages. Since then, Akha believe that the spirits have caused illness and other unwelcome disruptions of human life. The Akha year is divided into the peoples' season (dry) and the spirits' season (wet). During the latter, spirits wander into the village, so they must be driven out as part of a yearly ancestor offering. Both people and rice are considered to have souls, the flight of which causes disease.

The most important and revered position in Akha spiritual matters is given to a village leader, whose ritual responsibilities include initiating the annual rebuilding of the village gates and the swing as well as advising and instructing villagers on important matters and settling disputes. Akha villages have an expert in ironworks called the pa jee who is considered of great significance in the village and who holds the second most important position within the society.

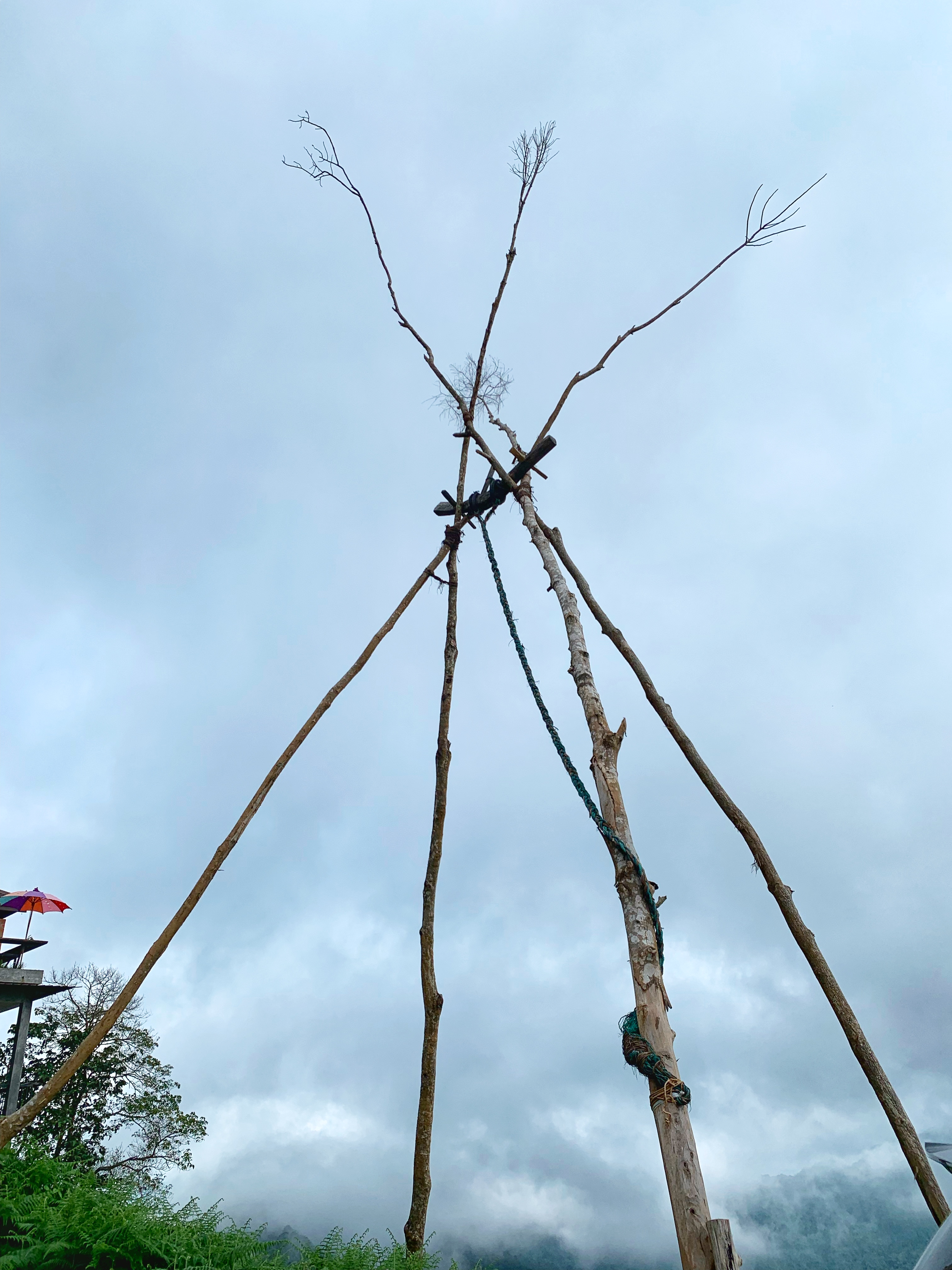
An Akha Swing in Pha Hee Village, Mae Sai district, Thailand

Perhaps the most important festival of the year is commonly known as the Swing Festival. The four-day Akha Swing Festival comes in late-August each year and falls on the 120th day after the village has planted its rice. The Akha call the Swing Festival, Yehkuja, which translates as "eating bitter rice", a phrase which references the previous year's dwindling rice supply incorporates the hope that monsoons will soon water the new crop. Festival activities include ritual offerings to family ancestral spirits at the ancestral altar in a corner of the women's side of the house. Offerings consist of bits of cooked food, water, and rice whiskey. The swing festival is particularly important for Akha women, who will display the clothing they spent all year making and who will show, through ornamentation, that they are becoming older and of marriageable age. Because the women dress up in their best traditional clothing and ornaments and perform traditional dances and songs for the villagers, the Swing Festival is also known as Women's New Year. The traditional New Year which falls in late-December is known as Men's New Year.

The Akha put a heavy emphasis on genealogy. An important tradition involves the recounting by Akha males of their patrilineal genealogy. During the most important ceremonies the list is recited in its entirety back over 50 generations to the first Akha, Sm Mi O. It is said that all Akha males should be able to do so. The recounting of this lineage plays a role in the incest taboo: If a male and female Akha find a common male ancestor within their last six generations, they are not allowed to marry.

The Akha have several sets of rules governing matters on life, death, marriage, and birth. Akha traditionally marry in their teens or early twenties. Polygamy is permitted. Marriages may be village endogamous or exogamous. Wife-giving and -taking relationships are central to Akha society, with wife-givers superior to wife-takers.

Twins are considered an extremely ominous occurrence, one where spirits are considered to interfere with human matters. The Akha believed that only animals could give birth to more than one offspring and therefore considered twins as beasts. Up until about 20 years or so ago, they would have been killed immediately. According to Laos locals, the practice is still common although the government is trying to discourage it. Akha men whose wives had given birth to twins would not be allowed to participate on the hunt for a specific period.

Certain types of death, like that caused by a tiger, are considered particularly bad; the bodies must be treated and buried in specific ways.

Missionaries have been active among Akha, especially since the mid-20th century. Some Akha Christians live in separate Christian villages supported by missionary funds. Although many Akha people may be considered converts by the missionaries, nearly 100% practice some mixture of Christianity and traditional Akha beliefs.

=== Dress ===
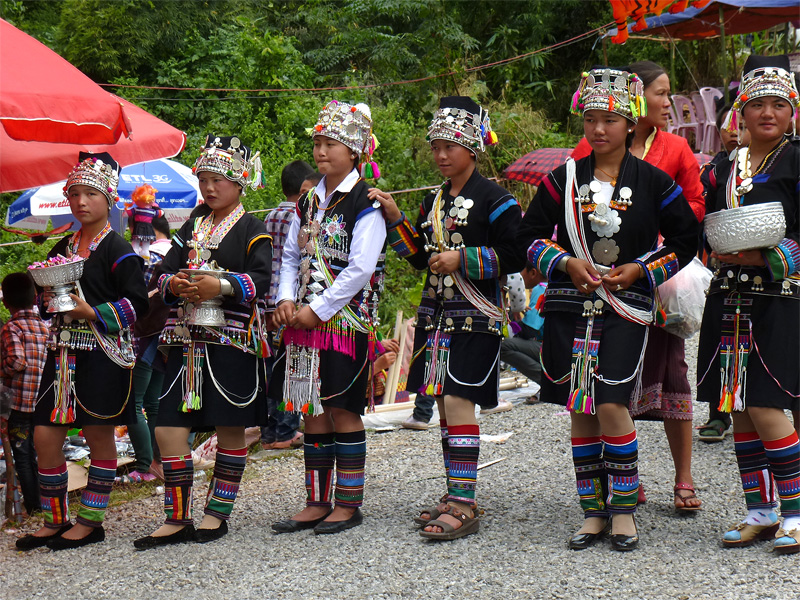
That Xieng Tung Festival, Muang Sing, Laos. Akha young girls in the welcoming committee. On their arrival, visitors will have a color ribbon pinned to their blouse in exchange for a donation.

The Akha people are often noted for their very recognizable sartorial practices. Akha women spin cotton into thread with a hand spindle and weave it on a foot-treadle loom. The cloth is hand dyed with indigo. Women wear broad leggings, a short black skirt with a white beaded sporran, a loose fitting black jacket with heavily embroidered cuffs and lapels. Akha women are known for their embroidery skills. While traditional clothes are typically worn for special ceremonies, one is more likely to see Akha villagers in full traditional garb in areas that have heavy volumes of tourists, particularly in Thailand.

The headdresses worn by the women are perhaps the most spectacular and elaborate items of Akha dress. Akha women define their age or marital status with the style of headdress worn. At roughly age 12, the Akha female exchanges her child's cap for that of a girl. A few years later she will begin to don the jejaw, the beaded sash that hangs down the front of her skirt and keeps it from flying up in the breeze. During mid-adolescence she will start wearing the adult woman's headdress. Headdresses are decorated by their owner and each is unique. Silver coins, monkey fur, and dyed chicken feathers are just a few of the things that might decorate the headdress. The headdresses differ by subgroup. According to an article about the variations in Akha headdress, "High Fashion, Hill Style", the

"Ulo Akha headdress consists of a bamboo cone, covered in beads, silver studs and seeds, edged in coins (silver rupees for the rich, baht for the poor) topped by several dangling chicken feather tassels and maybe a woolen pom-pom. The Pamee Akha wear a trapezoidal colt cap covered in silver studs with coins on the beaded side flaps and long chains of linked silver rings hanging down each side. The Lomi Akha wear a round cap covered in silver studs and framed by silver balls, coins and pendants and the married women attach a trapezoidal inscribed plate at the back."

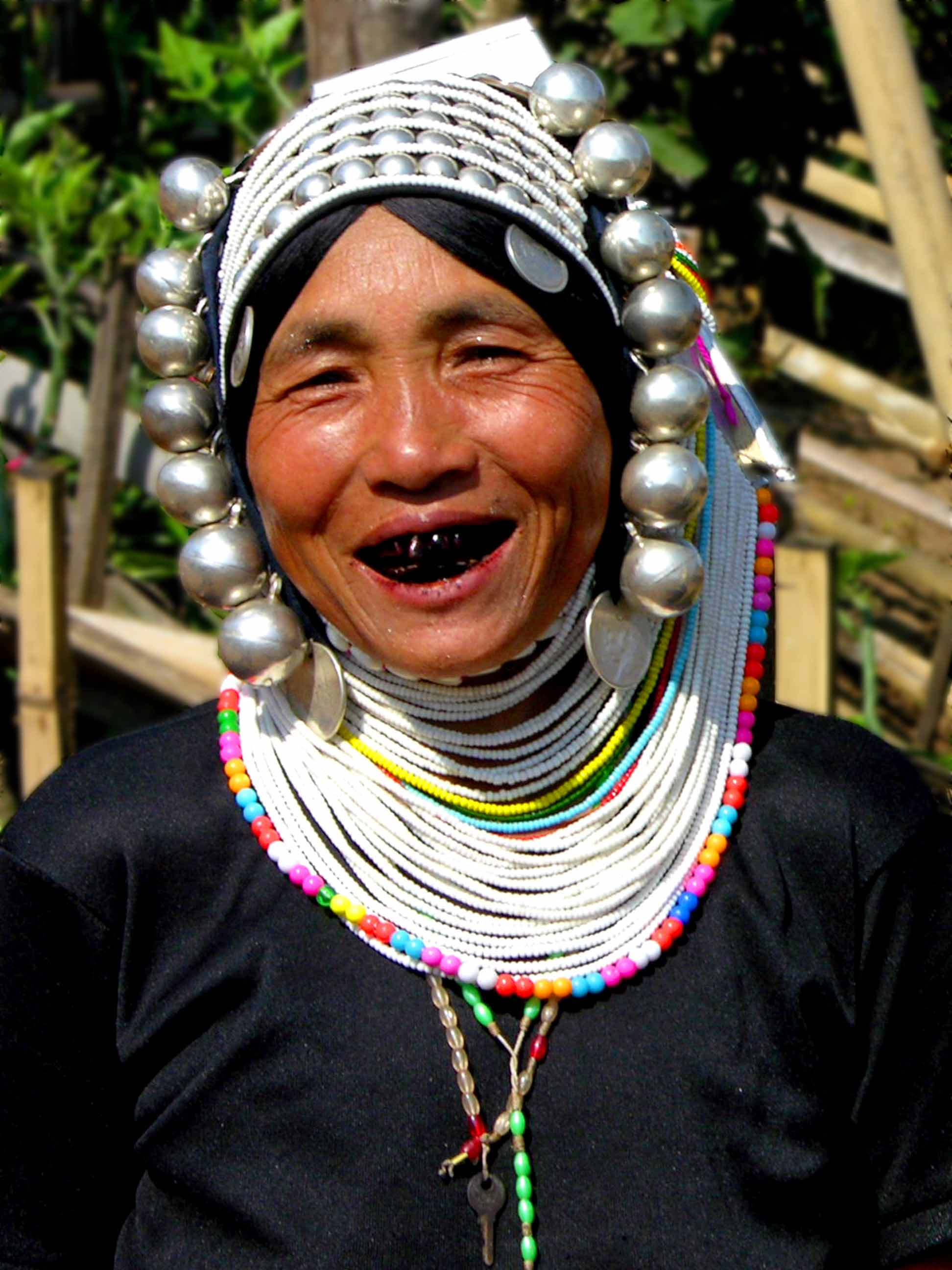
In Myanmar

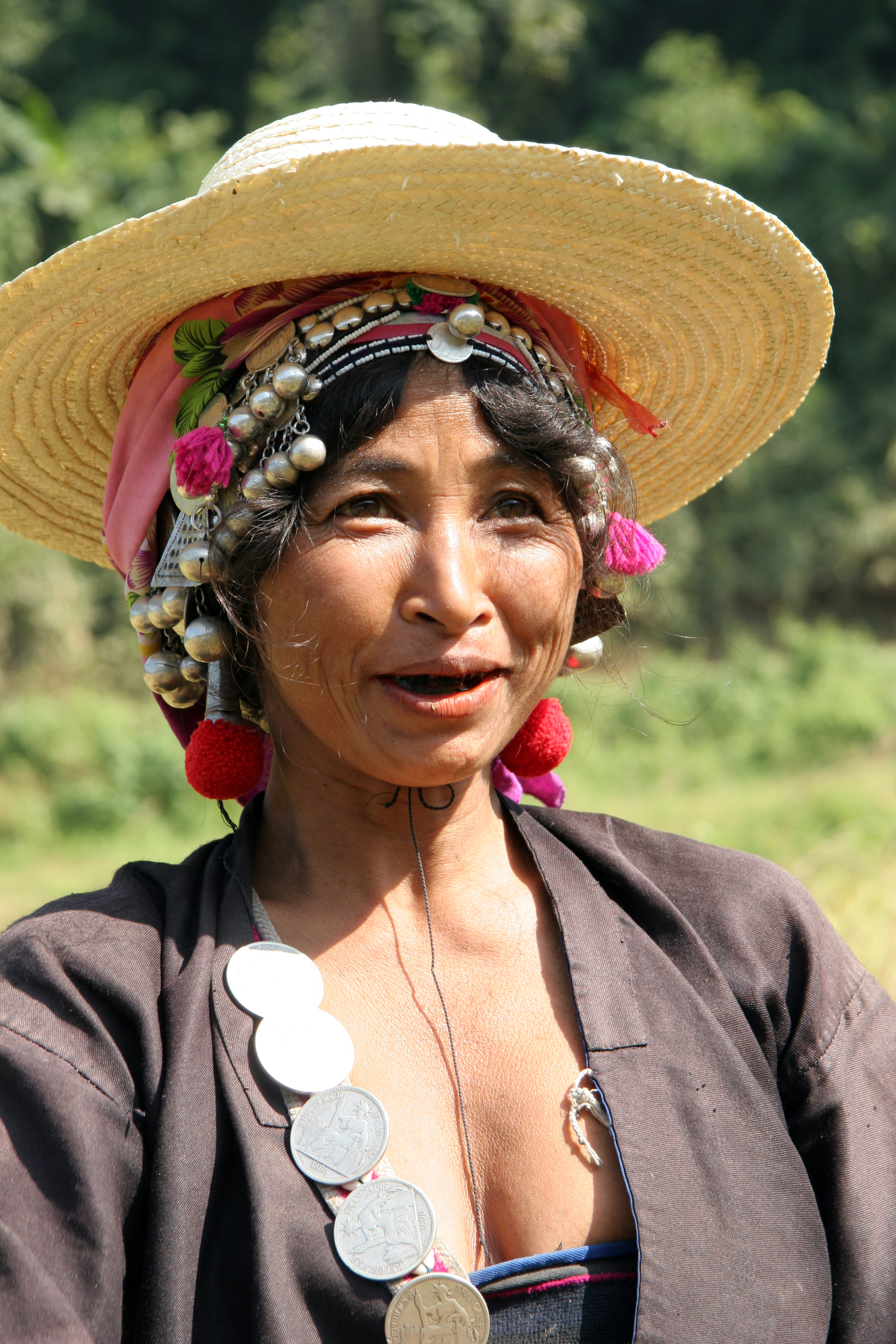
In Laos

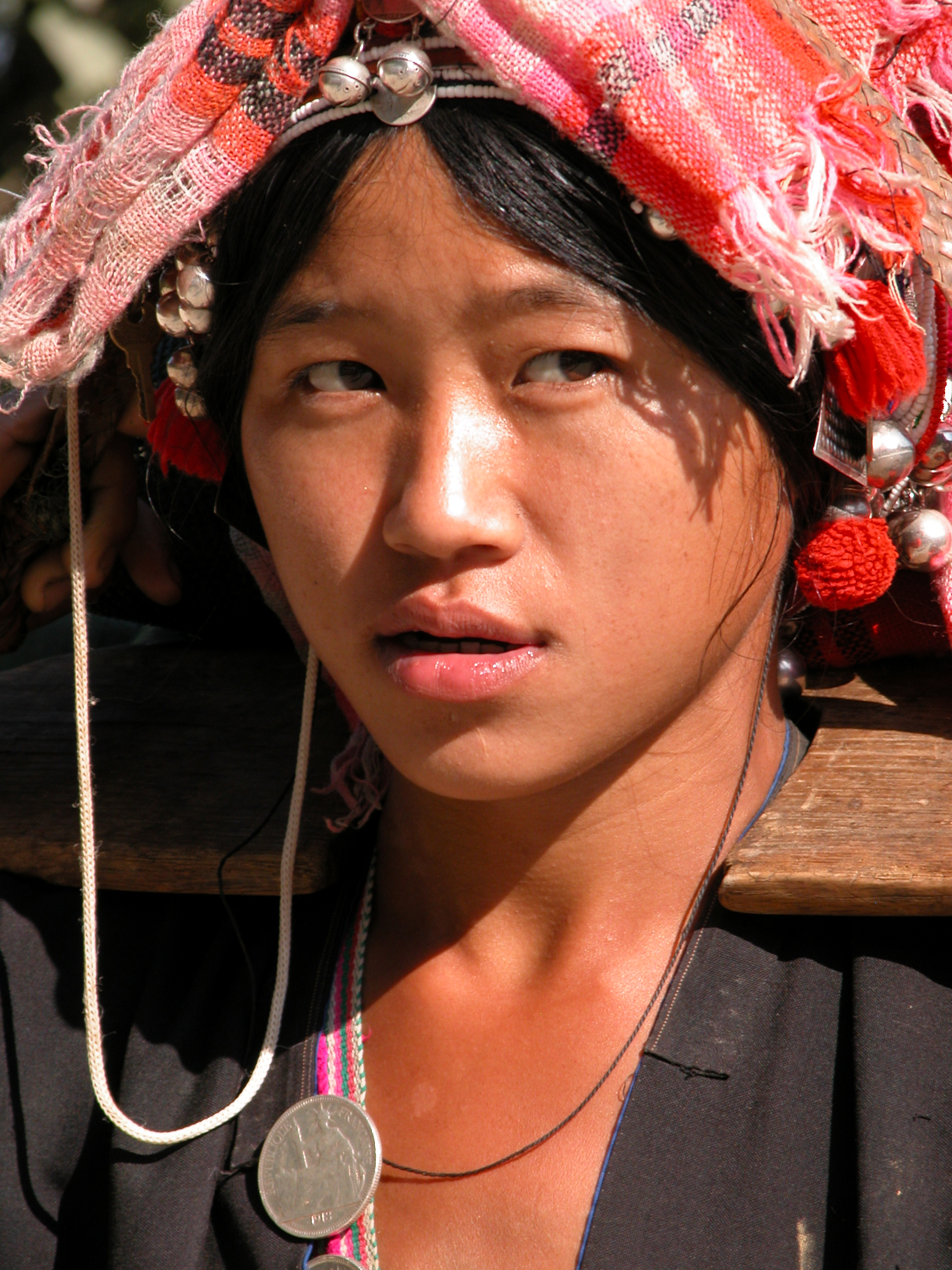
In Laos

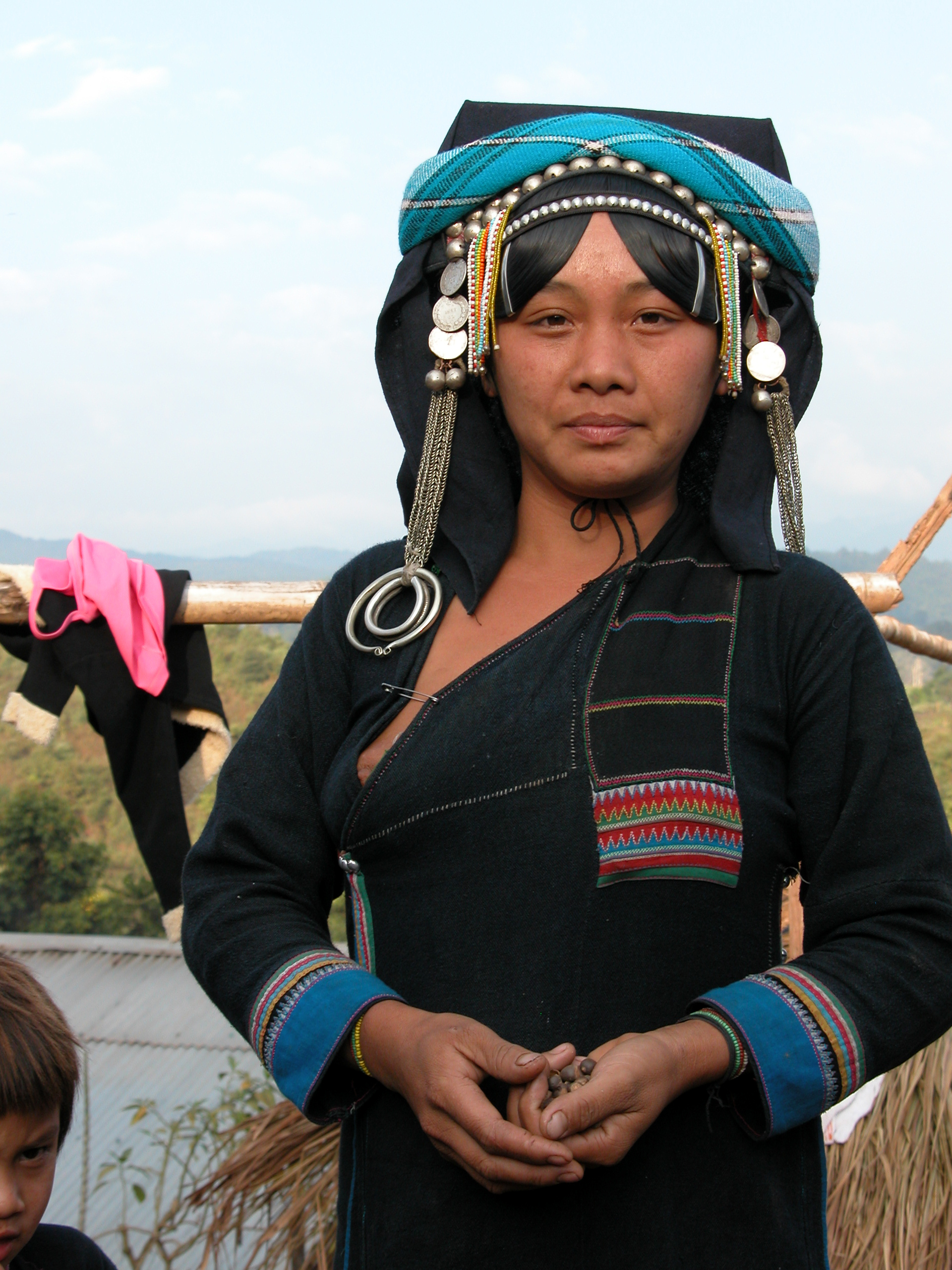
In Laos

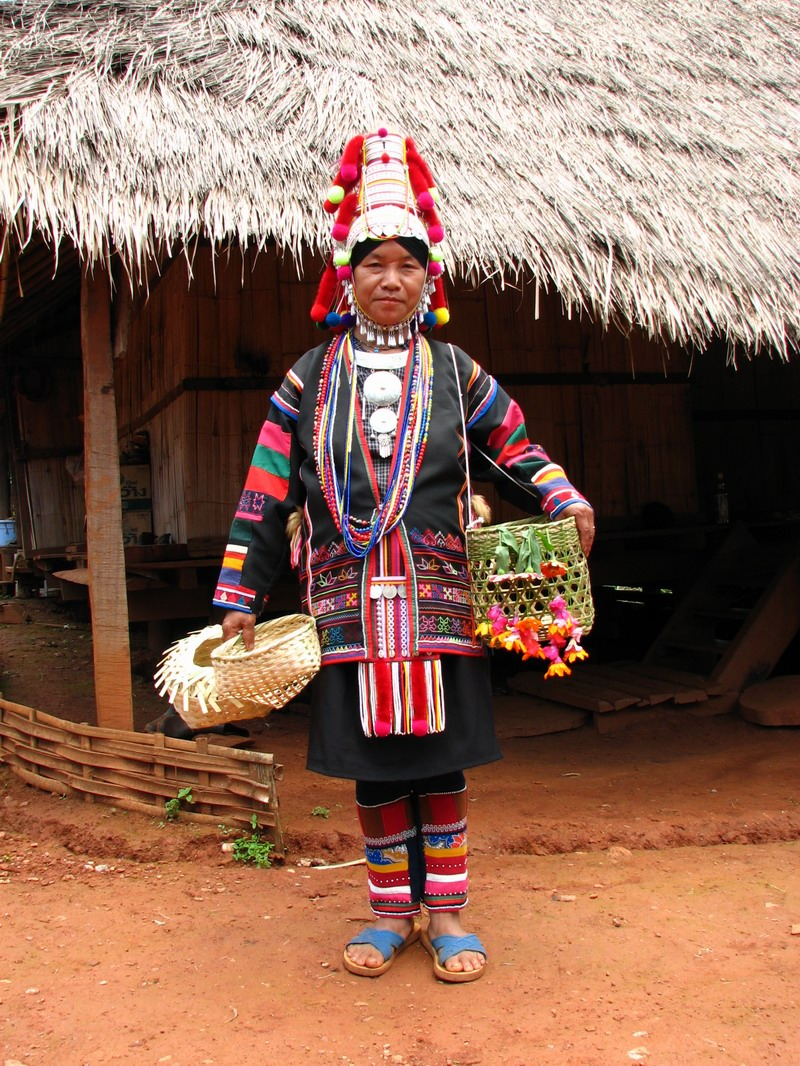
In Thailand

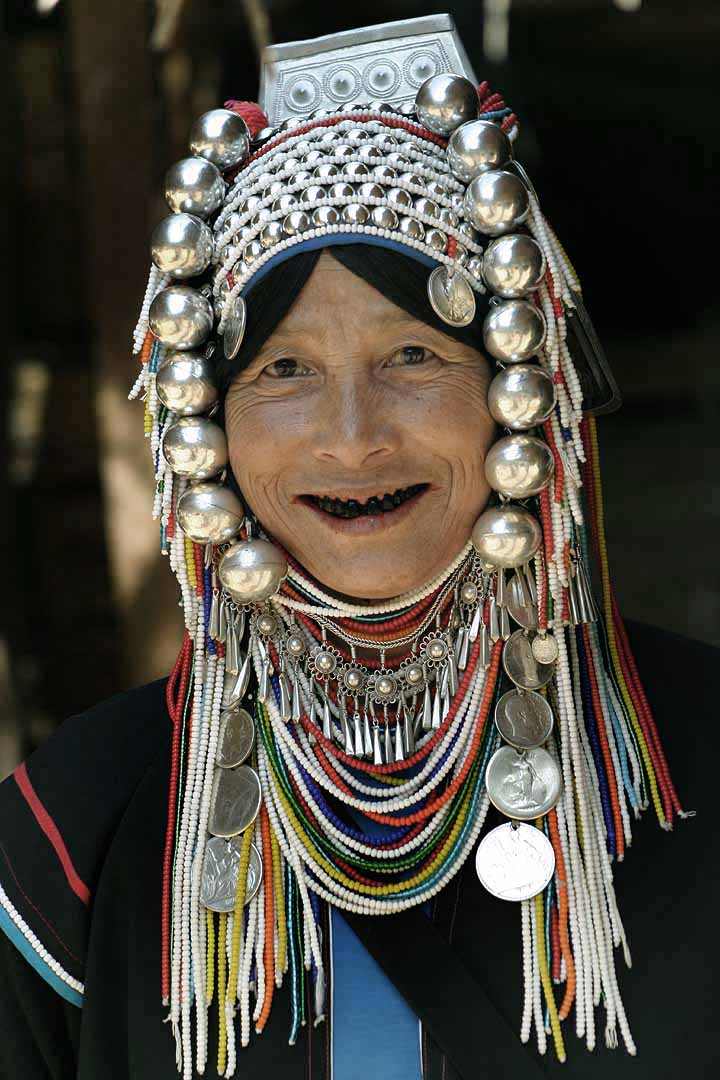
In Thailand

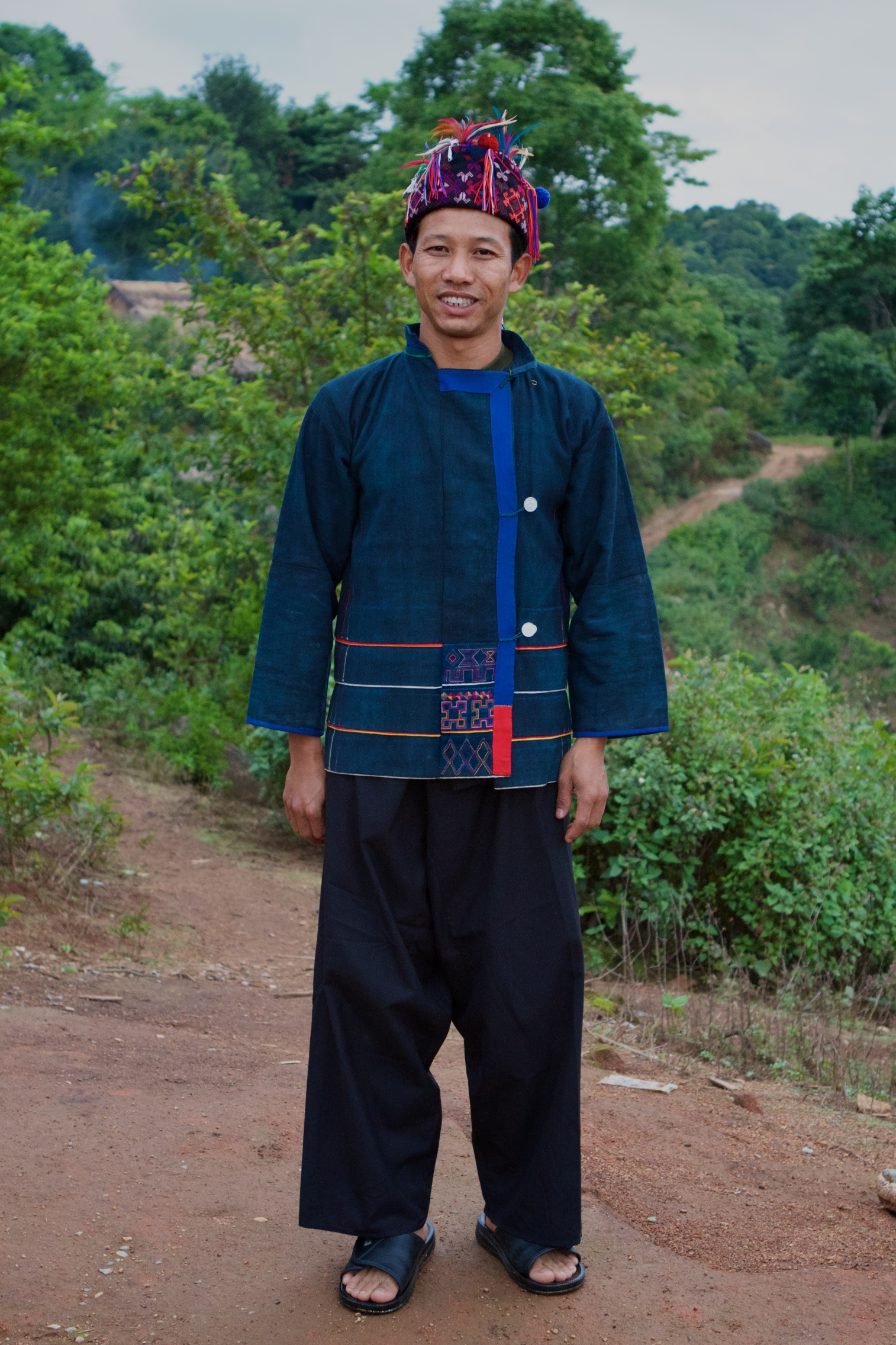
An Akha man from Ban Mae Chan Tai, Chiang Rai Province, Thailand

=== Cuisine ===
The main staple of Akha cuisine is highland rice. Besides raising cattle, pigs and chickens, and growing crops such as rice, corn, a variety of vegetables, chilies and herbs, part of their ingredients comes from the forest, either gathered or hunted.

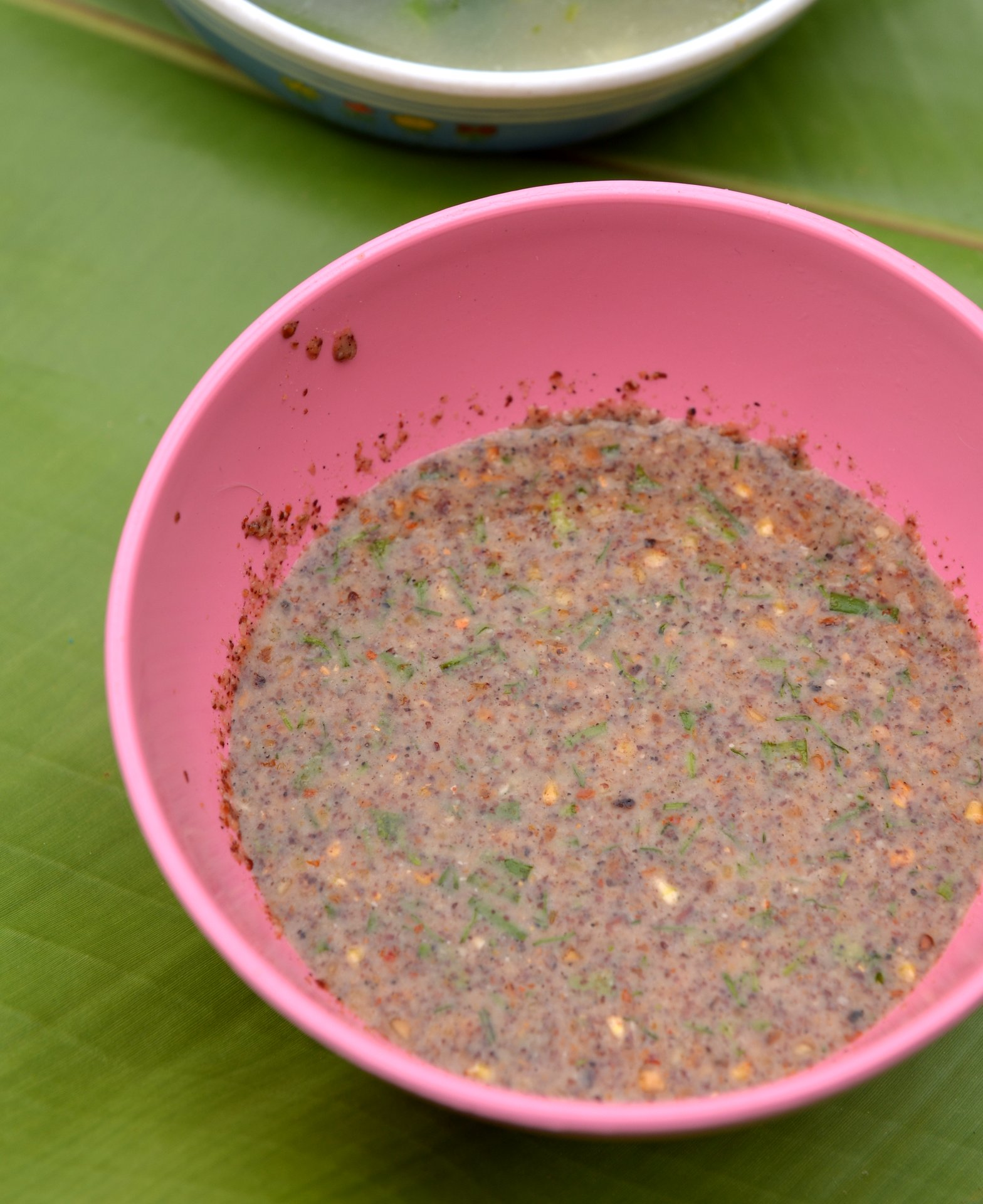
Nue phueng tzue-ze: a sauce for on rice, made from peanuts, herbs and dried chili

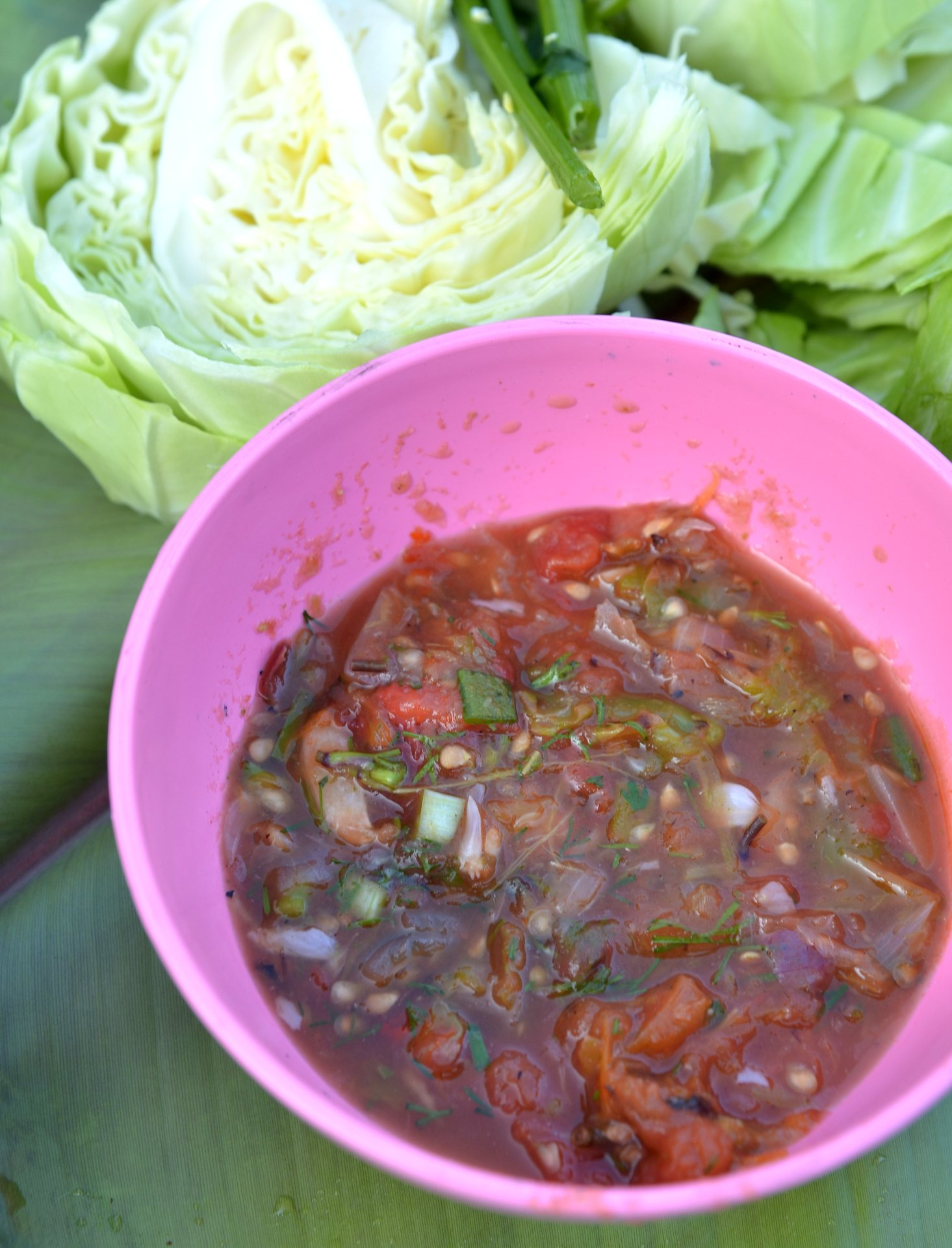
Sapi thong-ueh: a spicy sauce of tomato, fresh chilies, garlic, scallions, coriander/cilantro, and shallot, similar to a salsa cruda

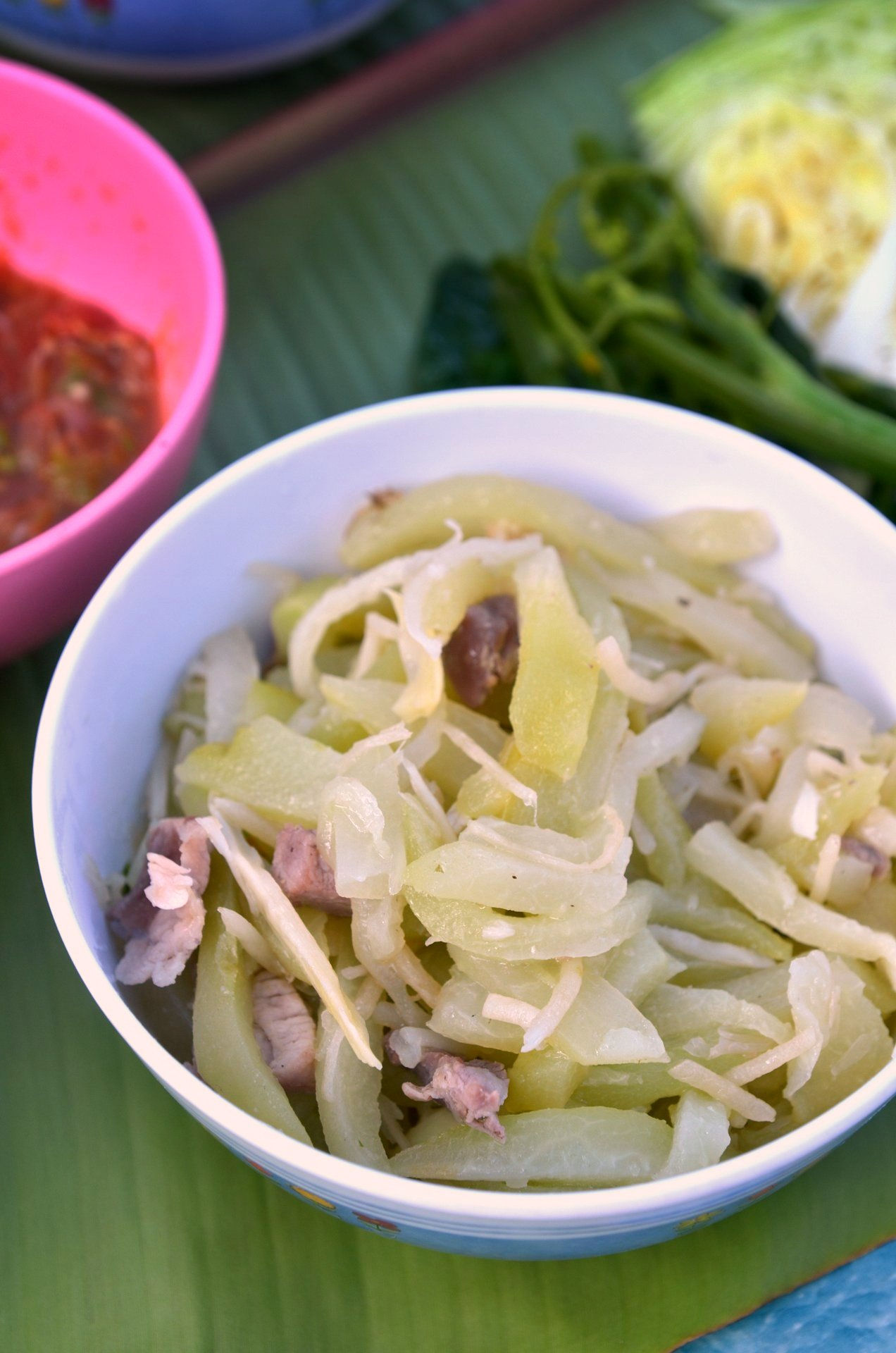
Manoh lue-ueh: sliced chayote fried with pork and garlic

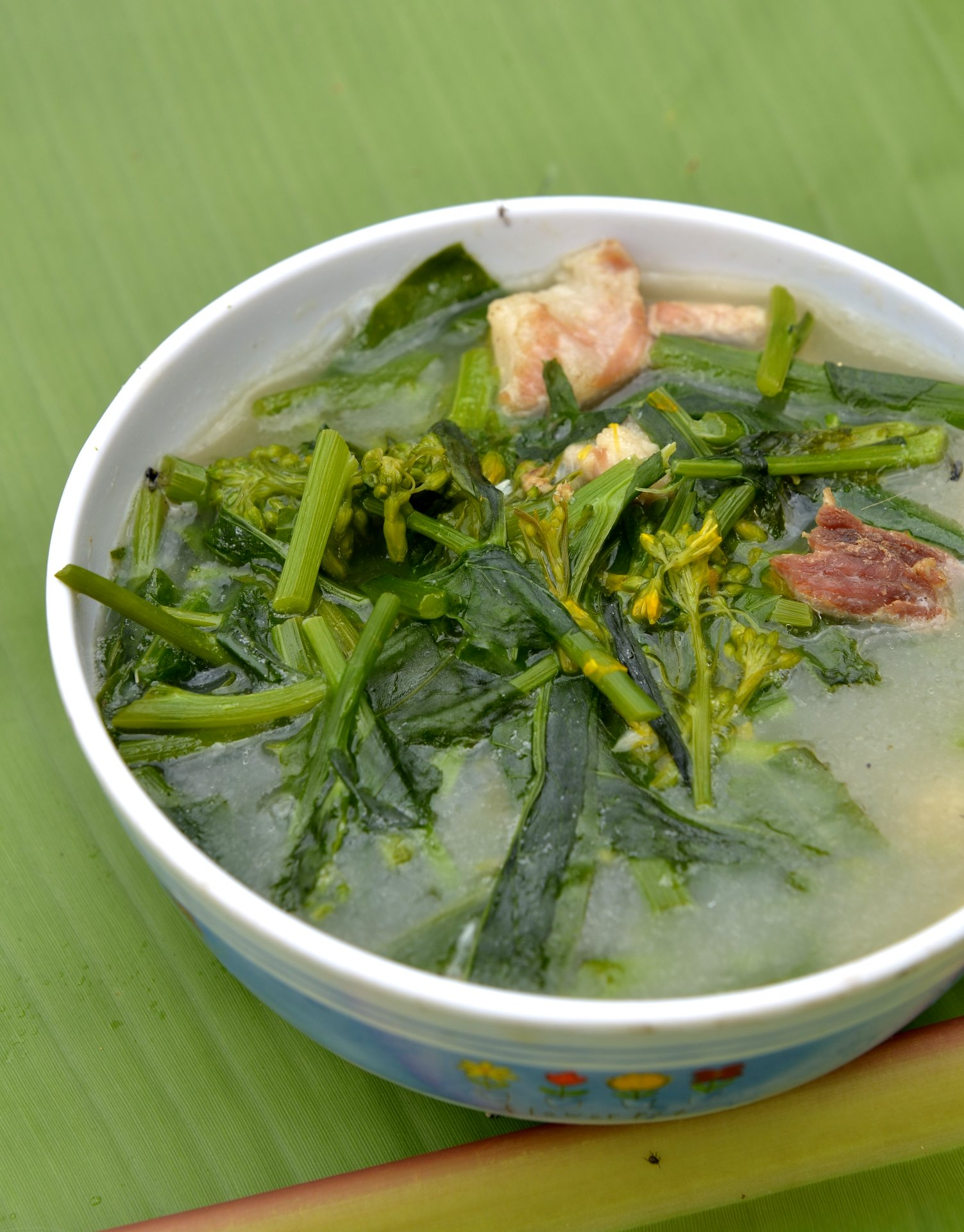
Hoh-pa cha-ueh: a soupy vegetable dish of kai-lan and pork

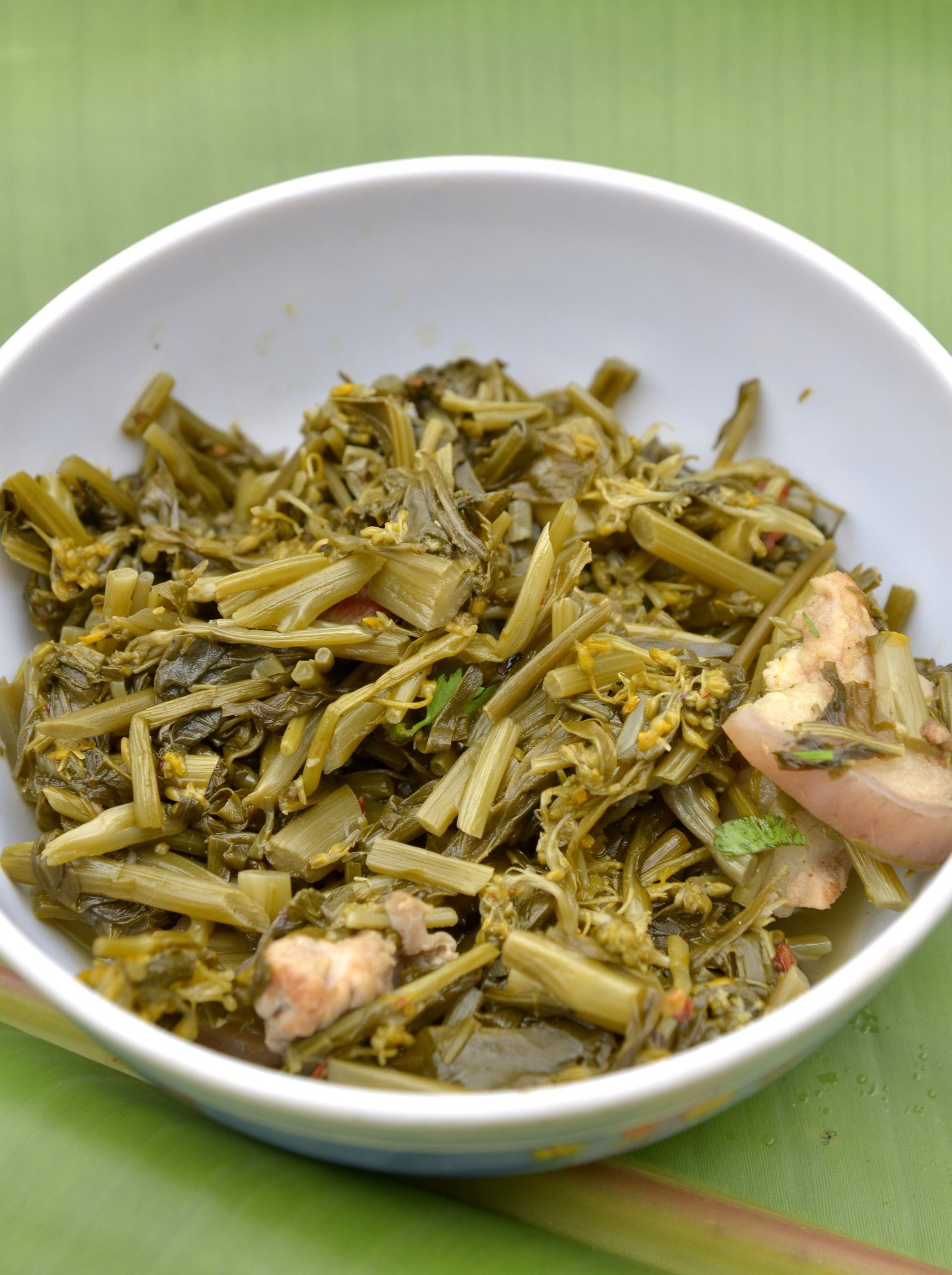
Hoh-pa chae lue-ueh: stir-fried, pickled mustard greens

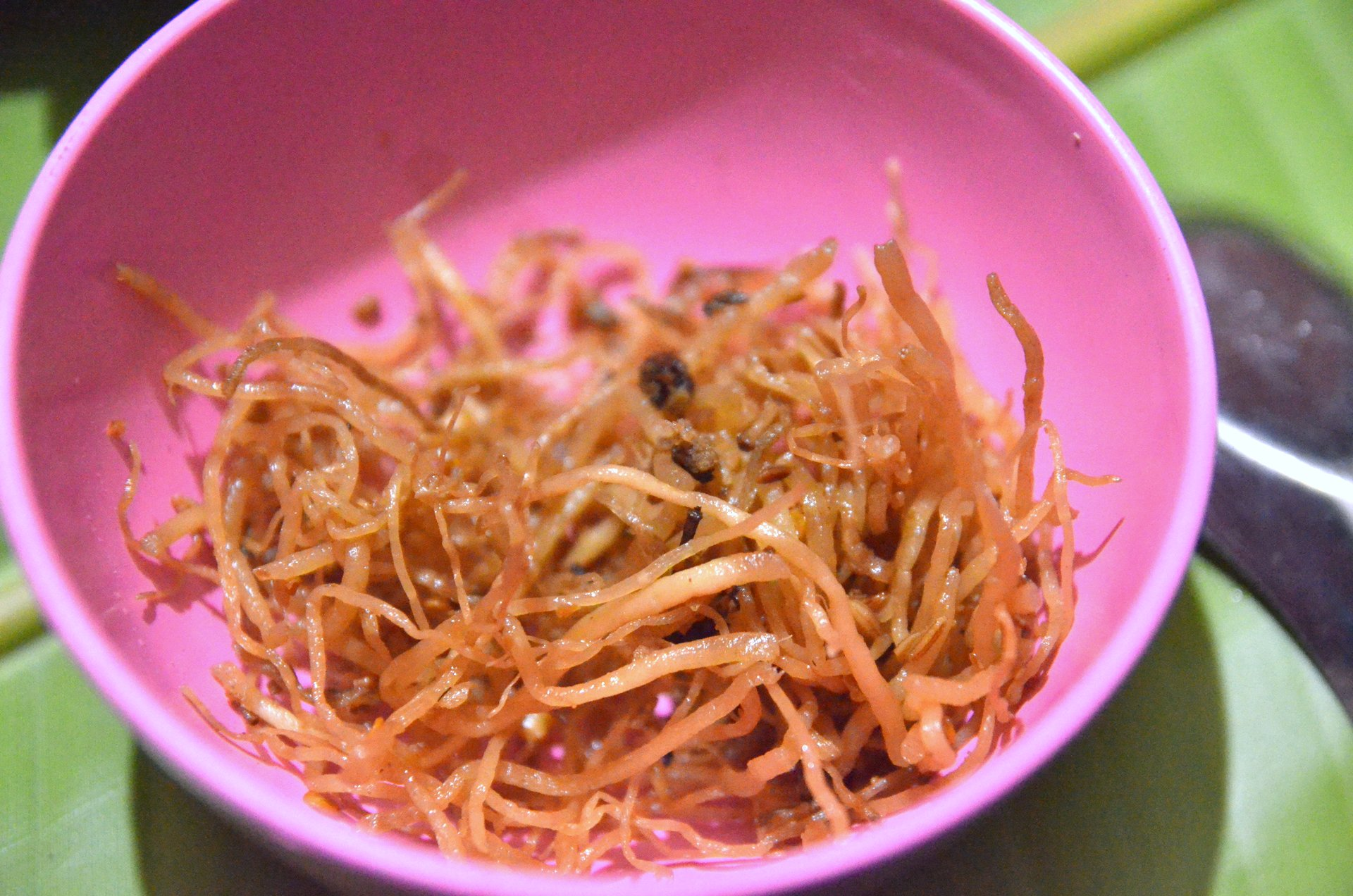
Guchi chae: fried, pickled roots of a certain type of onion

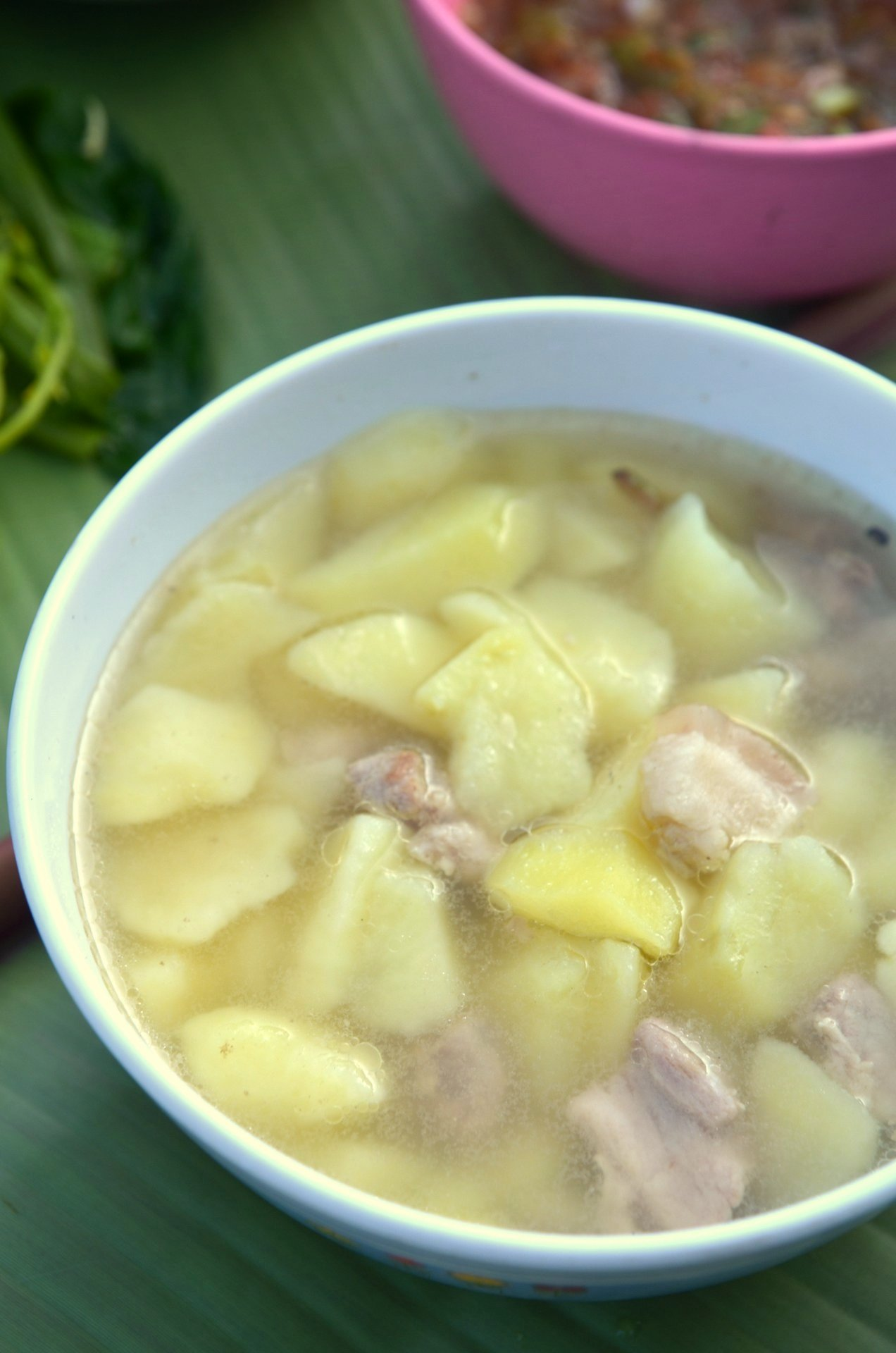
Mochue cha-lu: a stew of potatoes and pork

== Economy ==
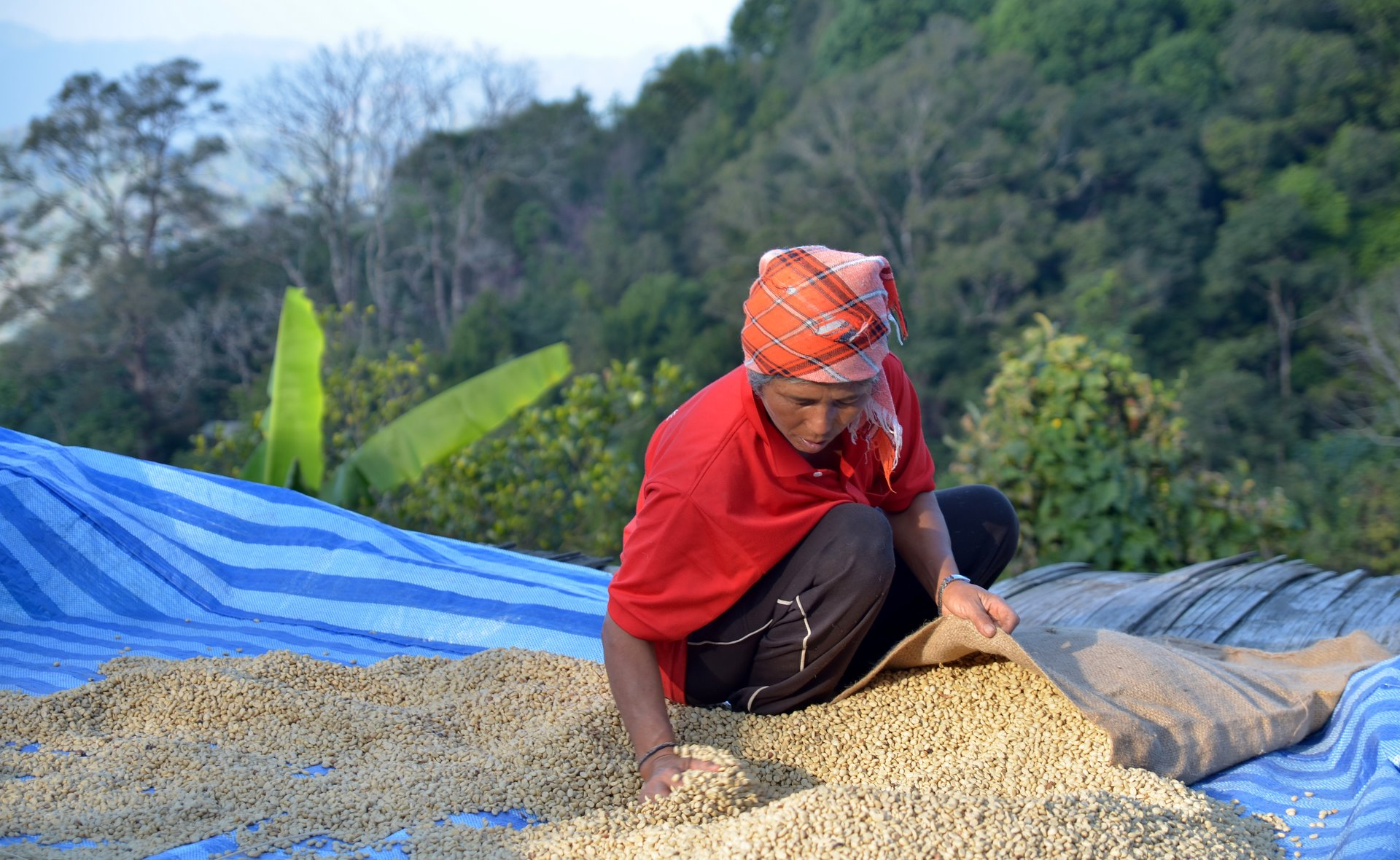
Packing dried arabica coffee beans in Thailand

Although primarily subsistence farmers, the Akha have long been involved in cash cropping and trade. In the last century, cotton and opium poppies were the principal cash crops. More recent cash crops are chilies, soybeans, cabbages, and tomatoes. One or more families in a village may operate a small shop in their home selling items such as cigarettes and kerosene. Itinerant traders, either lowlanders or hill-dwelling Yunnan Chinese, come to buy livestock or cash crops, or to sell blankets and other goods.

== Contemporary issues ==
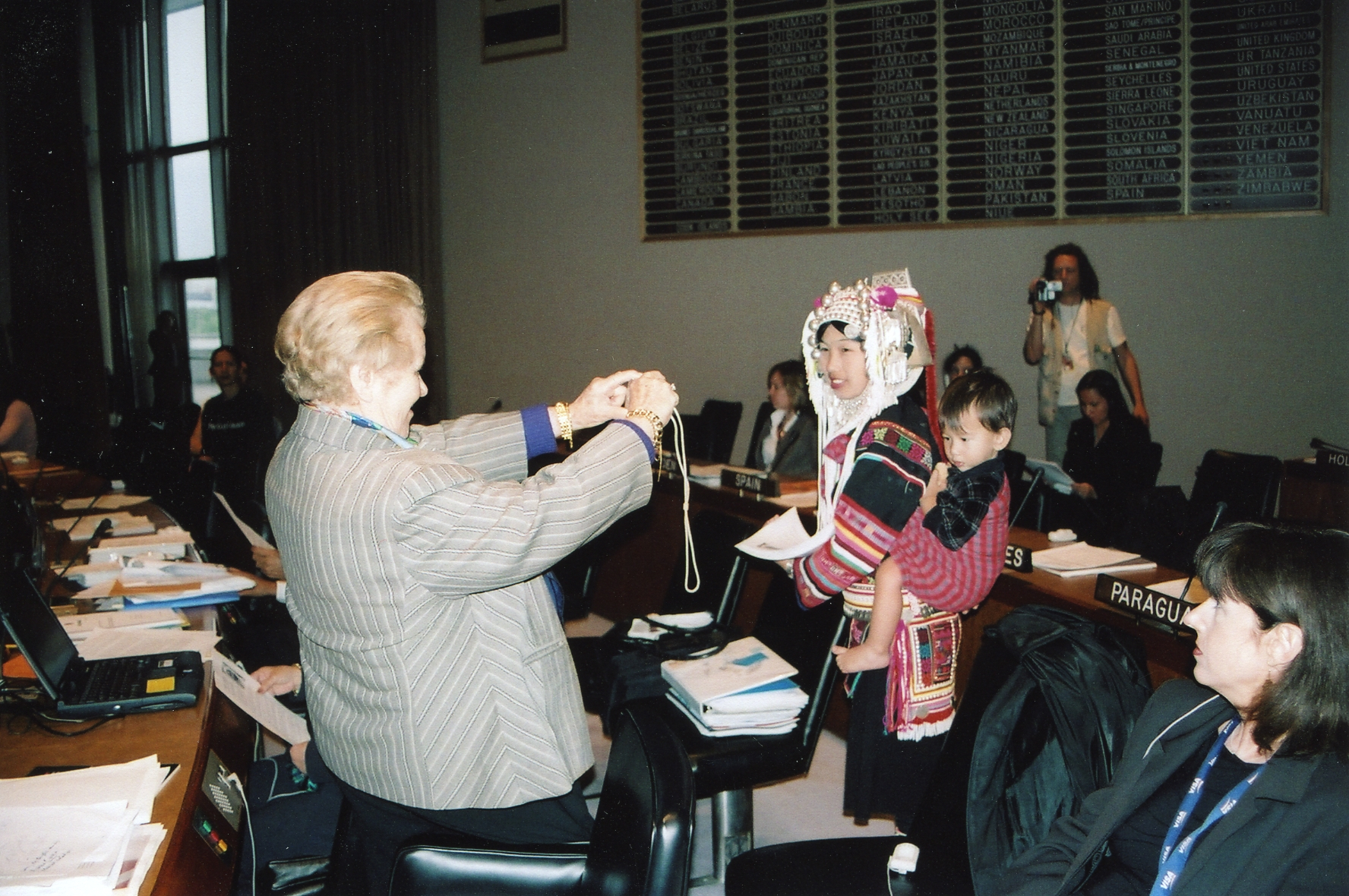
A representative of the Akha together with Erica-Irene Daes, a driving force at the Working Group on Indigenous Populations, at the United Nations in New York, 2006

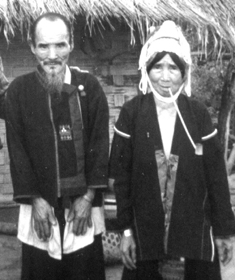
Elderly Akha couple that was robbed by the Thai army

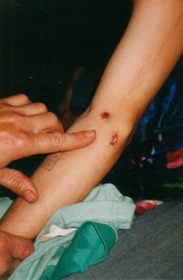
Arm wounds from having been subjected to electrocution

Being an ethnic minority with little easily accessible legal recourse, Akha everywhere have long been subject to rights abuses.

Perhaps the most important issue facing the Akha pertains to land. The Akha relationship to land is vitally connected to the continuation of the Akha culture, However, as they are not native to the region but are recent migrants that have settled on lands, they rarely have "official" or state-sanctioned land rights or claims to the land they occupy, as land rights are considered traditional. These conceptions of land are at odds with those held by the nation states whose land the Akha now occupy. Most Akha are not full-fledged citizens of the country they inhabit and are thus not allowed to legally purchase land, although most Akha villagers are too poor to even consider purchasing land.

It has been reported by rights groups that several land seizures of Akha land have been undertaken in the name of the Queen of Thailand. Originally a semi-nomadic people, the Akha are often relocated by the presiding national government to permanent villages, after which the government allegedly sells to logging companies and other private corporations access to lands formerly occupied by the Akha. The land onto which the Akha are displaced is almost always less fertile than their previous plots. On their new lands, the Akha can rarely produce enough food to sustain themselves and are often forced to leave and seek employment outside the villages, thus disrupting their traditional culture and economy.

In Thailand, laws have been passed that regulate forest usage in a way that impacts the traditional Akha lifestyle, including the 2007 Community Forest Act. The Asia-Pacific Human Rights Information Center, a Japanese group involved in indigenous peoples rights, wrote:

"These laws and resolutions have had severe impacts on indigenous peoples' rights to residence and land. Under these laws and resolutions millions of hectares of land have been declared as reserved and conservation forests, or protected areas. Today, 28.78% of Thailand is categorized as protected areas. As a result, thousands of farmers previously living in the forest or relying on the forest for their livelihood have been arrested and imprisoned and their lands seized. Cases have been filed against them for the so-called encroachment on government land."

The reasons given for Akha relocations vary, but a common response on the part of the Thai government is to cite a concern for the preservation of forests and the promotion of more sustainable agricultural techniques than the slash and burn agriculture traditionally used by the Akha. The Thai government's involvement in relocation might also possibly be motivated by concerns of national security. According to international human rights lawyer Jonathan Levy,

"The Akha are identified with the opium growers who until recently dominated that portion of the "Golden Triangle" in Thailand. Thailand has taken steps to eradicate opium cultivation by resettling the Akha into permanent villages. However, both opium and long ingrained farming techniques are key to the complex Akha culture. While traditional opium cultivation has been suppressed, processed heroine and latest scourge, methamphetamine, is freely available from Burma. Thus Akha have become both impoverished farmers and in many cases narcotic addicts. As the Akha are resettled they come into contact with mainstream Thai culture, many Akha women are drawn to the "easy" money of the sex industry."

The Akha are said to have the highest rates of addiction of all the hill tribes and are at the highest risk for contracting HIV/AIDS or other STDs. Measures have been undertaken by state and human rights organizations including the UNESCO Asia Pacific Regional Bureau for Education in Bangkok, and NCA in Lao PDR, to provide hill tribes, including the Akha, with "comprehensive community-based, non-formal education" on HIV and drug abuse prevention. In addition, detoxification clinics have been opened in the region, with particularly positive consequences for women who tend to have lower rates of addiction, but often bear the brunt of compensating for their missing partners financially and emotionally.

Despite their numbers, the Akha are the poorest of all the hill tribes. As roads bring accessibility and tourists, they provide relief from the poverty of village life, especially for the younger generations who increasingly find themselves engaged in labor outside the villages. Many villages report a population decrease as many leave to find work in the cities, often for very long periods. Many Akha complain that the younger generations are becoming increasingly less interested in traditional culture and ways and more and more susceptible to outside, mainstream, cultural influences. According to one author, where the village squares were once "filled with the sounds of courtship songs", radios are now more likely to play pop hits.

== See also ==
- Akha language
- Matthew McDaniel
- Clement Vismara
- Lisa See, author of The Tea Girl of Hummingbird Lane
