= McDaniels =

McDaniels is a surname. Notable people with the surname include:

- Ben McDaniels (born 1980), American football player and coach
- Booker McDaniels (1913–1974), American baseball player
- Darryl McDaniels (born 1964), American musician
- Gene McDaniels (1935–2011), American singer-songwriter
- Gisela McDaniel (born 1995), Indigenous Chamorro visual artist
- Grace McDaniels (1888–1958), American circus performer
- Jackie McDaniels, American poker player
- Jaden McDaniels (born 2000), American basketball player
- Jalen McDaniels (born 1998), American basketball player
- Jim McDaniels (1948–2017), American basketball player
- Josh McDaniels (born 1976), American football coach
- Pellom McDaniels (born 1968), American football player
- Ralph McDaniels (born 1959), American television personality
