= Matthew McDaniel =

American activist

Matthew Duncan McDaniel
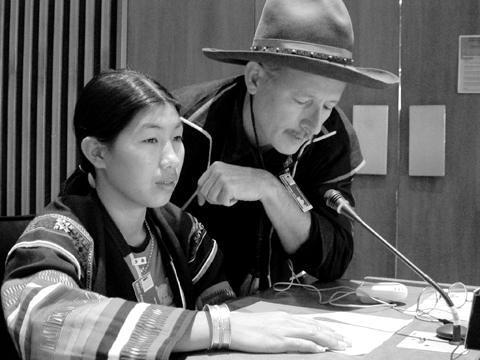
- Matthew McDaniel and his Akha wife, Michu Uaiyue, at the United Nations Permanent Forum on Indigenous Issues. May 2006.
- Website: akha.org

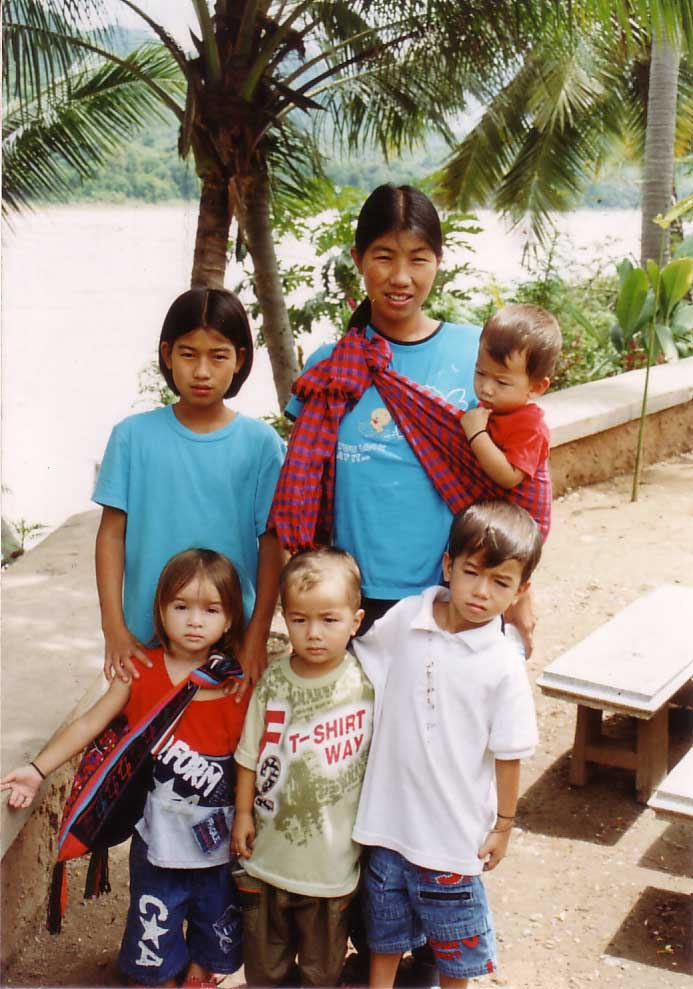
Luang Prabang, Laos. July 2005. Matthew McDaniel's family.

Matthew Duncan McDaniel is an American indigenous rights activist from Oregon. McDaniel is a former carpenter working to improve human rights for the Akha people of Thailand and Laos. He is the founder of the Akha Heritage Foundation. He lived in Thailand from 1991 to 2004.

== Background ==
On April 18, 2004, McDaniel was arrested at Thailand's border with Burma by Thai immigration authorities, jailed for nine days, and then deported. In July 2005 he moved from the USA back to Laos. His Thai Akha wife and children left Thailand and went to Laos to be with him. After his wife and children received visas, the family relocated to the United States in May 2006. A December 22, 2005 Keizertimes article reported on the difficulty in getting the visas.

McDaniel is opposed to what he claims are missionary efforts to rewrite Akha history and eradicate their culture. This includes a language and oral history, which he says are critical components to their unique identity. He opposes coercive missionary conversion tactics, and the removal of Akha children from their families and villages. He has frequently questioned why charities such as Rotary International support certain missionary groups. McDaniel has asserted that Rotary International has since pulled their web pages supporting the funding of the Children of the Golden Triangle Mission. McDaniel also asserted that UNESCO was working with US missionaries who were "destroying Akha culture".

A May 15, 2004 Asia Times article reported:

McDaniel estimates that more than 100 organizations are proselytizing. "There's way too many missionaries coming. It's become a free-for-all. They come in with money from their home churches, with four-wheel drives, living like kings, like they never would back home," said McDaniel, whose forthright campaign upset many people, spurring whispers about his motives. McDaniel was reportedly deported by Thai authorities after being interviewed for this article; the reasons for the deportation are unclear.

A January 2003 Village Voice article described him as "the evangelicals' fiercest critic in Chiang Rai."

Since moving to Thailand 15 years ago, McDaniel has started a small nongovernmental organization called the Akha Heritage Foundation. With an annual budget of $6000, the group provides services that range from the establishing of fish farms and publishing books in the Akha language to documenting human rights violations.

Half Moon Bay Review reported in a May 2009 article:

Bruno, a San Francisco resident, teamed up with McDaniel on what she calls "guerilla aid style" missions to usher medical supplies across the Thai-Burmese border to Akha people. Both were fighting a common enemy – exploitation and oppression – one with a knapsack full of medicine, the other with a video camera. She remembers watching McDaniel motorbike across the border alongside black market traders and sex traffickers, wearing a leather cowboy hat and shouldering a knapsack packed with bandages and ointments for homeless Akha.

== Motivations ==
The following is from an interview with Matthew McDaniel reported in the November 12, 2007 edition of the Statesman Journal:

Question: Where did your passion for the Akha come from? Answer: I was on a bridge that connects Burma and Thailand, and I saw a policeman riding his motor bike and come up behind a little child walking down a dusty street begging for money for his mother. As the policeman went by on the motor bike, I saw him grab the child by the back of the head and slam him face first into the concrete. The little boy later died.

== Drug war ==
McDaniel accuses the "US Drug War" and the UN Office of Drugs and Crime for helping cause the arrest, forced dislocation, prosecution, starvation, death and extrajudicial killings of Akha people in Thailand and Laos. McDaniel has filed reports with the United Nations Commission on Human Rights, and the International Criminal Court.

He documented extrajudicial killings during the anti-drugs push of Thailand's prime minister Thaksin Shinawatra in 2003.

For example, Matthew McDaniel and three of his associates (Itaru Furuta, Katharine Ricke, and Lisa Friedland) documented the June 20, 2003 killing of Leeh Huuh. McDaniel reported:

TODAY. Two days ago Leeh Huuh, other son of Ah Nah Burh Chay and Loh Pah Ah Sauh were called to the Phrao police station. The police left a notice with Loh Pah's wife which she had to sign. TODAY at 8am these two men left for the police station. They were ambushed on the road and shot to death. We saw the bodies which we photographed. Police at Phrao police station denied knowledge of the details of the case that we already knew.

The first photo below is of Leeh Huuh and his wife in 2002. The next three photos are of Leeh Huuh's body on June 20, 2003. The last photo is of two Akha wives whose husbands had been killed earlier the same day. Leeh Huuh's wife is on the right side. Matthew McDaniel took the photos.

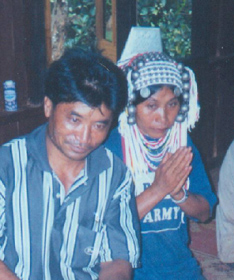

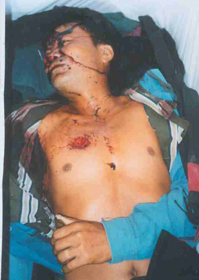

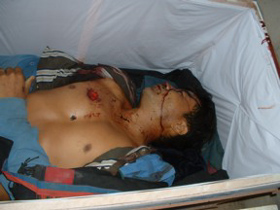

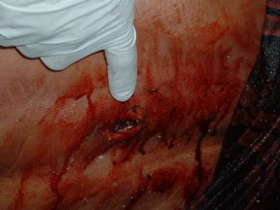

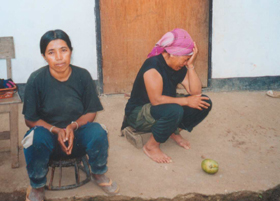

Thailand's English-language newspaper The Nation reported on the drug war in November 2007:

Of 2,500 deaths in the government's war on drugs in 2003, a fact-finding panel has found that more than half were not involved in drugs at all. At a brainstorming session, a representative from the Office of Narcotics Control Board (ONCB) Tuesday disclosed that as many as 1,400 people were killed and labeled as drug suspects despite the fact that they had no link to drugs.

Prosecutor Kunlapon Ponlawan said "it was not difficult to investigate extra-judicial killings carried out by police officers as the trigger-pullers usually confessed."

The January 24, 2008 edition of The Economist reported that

over half of those killed in 2003 had no links to the drugs trade. The panel blamed the violence on a government 'shoot-to-kill' policy based on flawed blacklists. But far from leading to the prosecutions of those involved, its findings have been buried. The outgoing interim prime minister, Surayud Chulanont, took office vowing to right Mr Thaksin's wrongs. Yet this week he said there was insufficient evidence to take legal action over the killings. It is easy to see why the tide has turned. Sunai Phasuk, a researcher for Human Rights Watch, a lobbying group, says that the panel's original report named the politicians who egged on the gunmen. But after the PPP won last month's elections, those names were omitted.

The New York Times reported on April 8, 2003:

Since the death of 9-year-old Chakraphan, there have been frequent reports in the Thai press of summary executions and their innocent victims. There was the 16-month-old girl who was shot dead along with her mother, Raiwan Khwanthongyen. There was the pregnant woman, Daranee Tasanawadee, who was killed in front of her two young sons. There was the 8-year-old boy, Jirasak Unthong, who was the only witness to the killing of his parents as they headed home from a temple fair. There was Suwit Baison, 23, a cameraman for a local television station, who fell to his knees in tears in front of Mr. Thaksin and begged for an investigation into the killing of his parents. His stepfather had once been arrested for smoking marijuana, Mr. Suwit said. When the police offered to drop the charge if he would admit to using methamphetamines, he opted instead to pay the $100 fine for marijuana use. Both parents were shot dead as they returned home from the police station on a motorbike. Mr. Suwit said 10 other people in his neighborhood had also been killed after surrendering to the police.

On March 4, 2008 the Asia Sentinel reported:

The first war on drugs, as it was known, pretty much evolved into a war on anybody the police decided to shoot. Under former premier Thaksin Shinawatra, more than 2,800 people were killed over a three-month period five years ago —about twice the normal murder rate of about 500 per month. Appointed Premier Surayud Chulanont half-heartedly set up a commission to investigate the drugs war nearly a year after the coup, but it had the effect of absolving the Thaksin administration. The committee found that about 1,370 of those deaths were related to drugs, while 878 were not. Another 571 people were killed for no apparent reason, according to the panel, and police investigated just 80 of those cases.

== United Nations ==
On May 18, 2006 Matthew McDaniel and his Akha wife, Michu Uaiyue, presented a statement at the United Nations Permanent Forum on Indigenous Issues. The full Michu Uaiyue statement (translated by Matthew McDaniel) is here:

From the description page for the May 26, 2006 United Nations satellite television feed is this info about the statement:

4. SOUNDBITE (Akha) Michu Wurh Zurh, Director Akha Heritage Foundation translated by her husband Matthew McDaniel (English)

She says that because the Thai forestry department has taken about all the land there is no food and a lot of people have to go to places like Bangkok and work in slave jobs in order to get money to survive because of the food situation that the Thai government has created for the Akha people.

5. Close up Michu's son in Akha outfit

6. Close up, Jerry Eaglefeather plays on the flute for 4 Akha children, ages 7, 5, 3 and 1

7. Close up, Akha children applaud

Below are some photos taken by Matthew McDaniel in May 2006 at the United Nations. Click to enlarge them, and to see the captions. Click again to enlarge further.

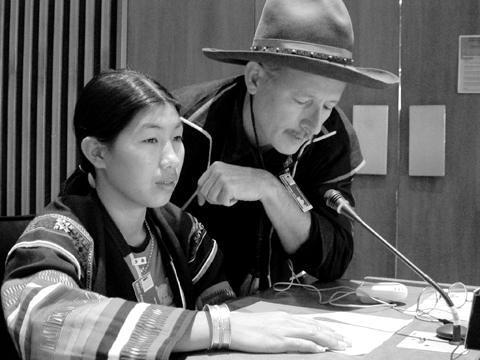

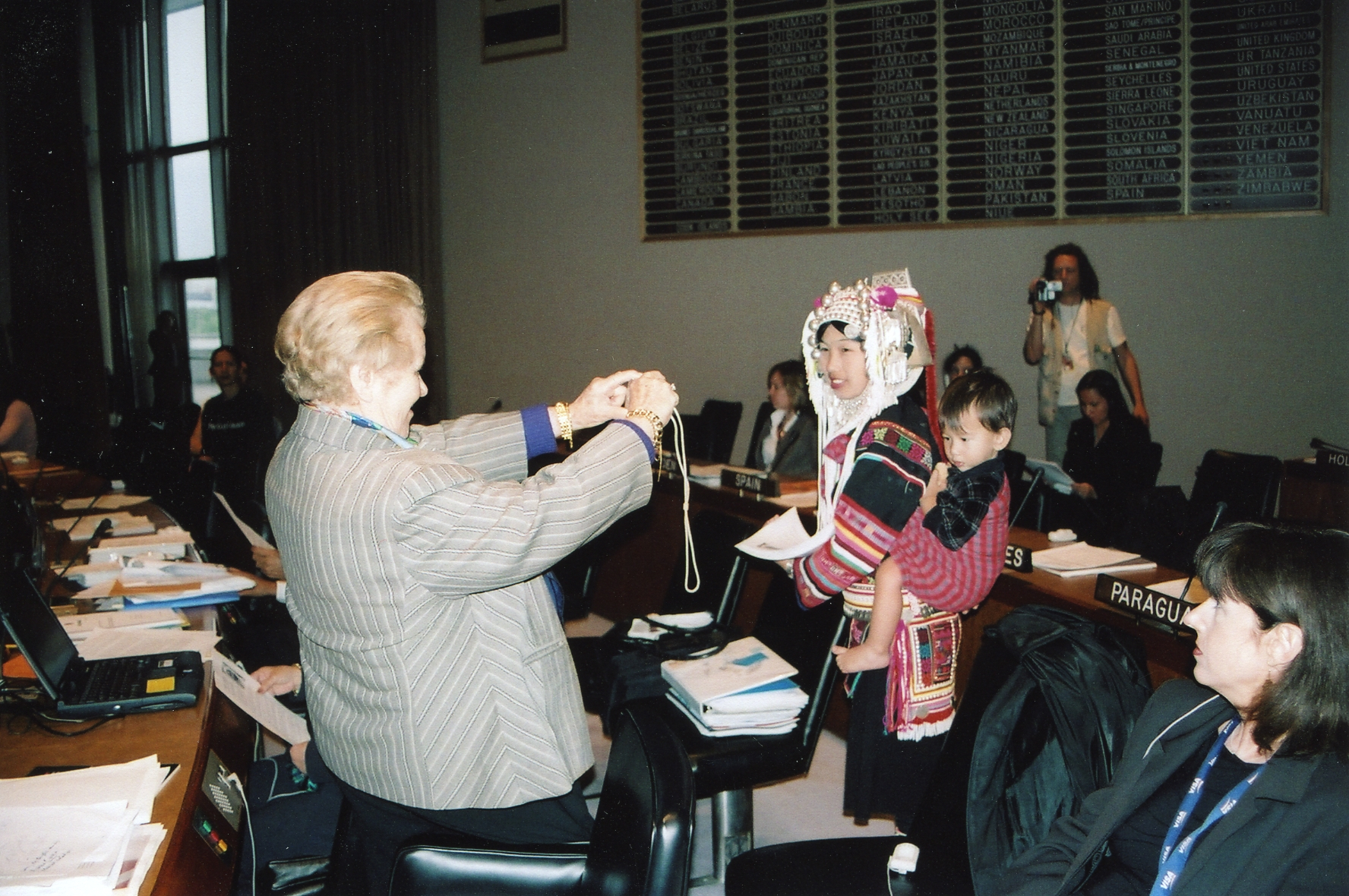

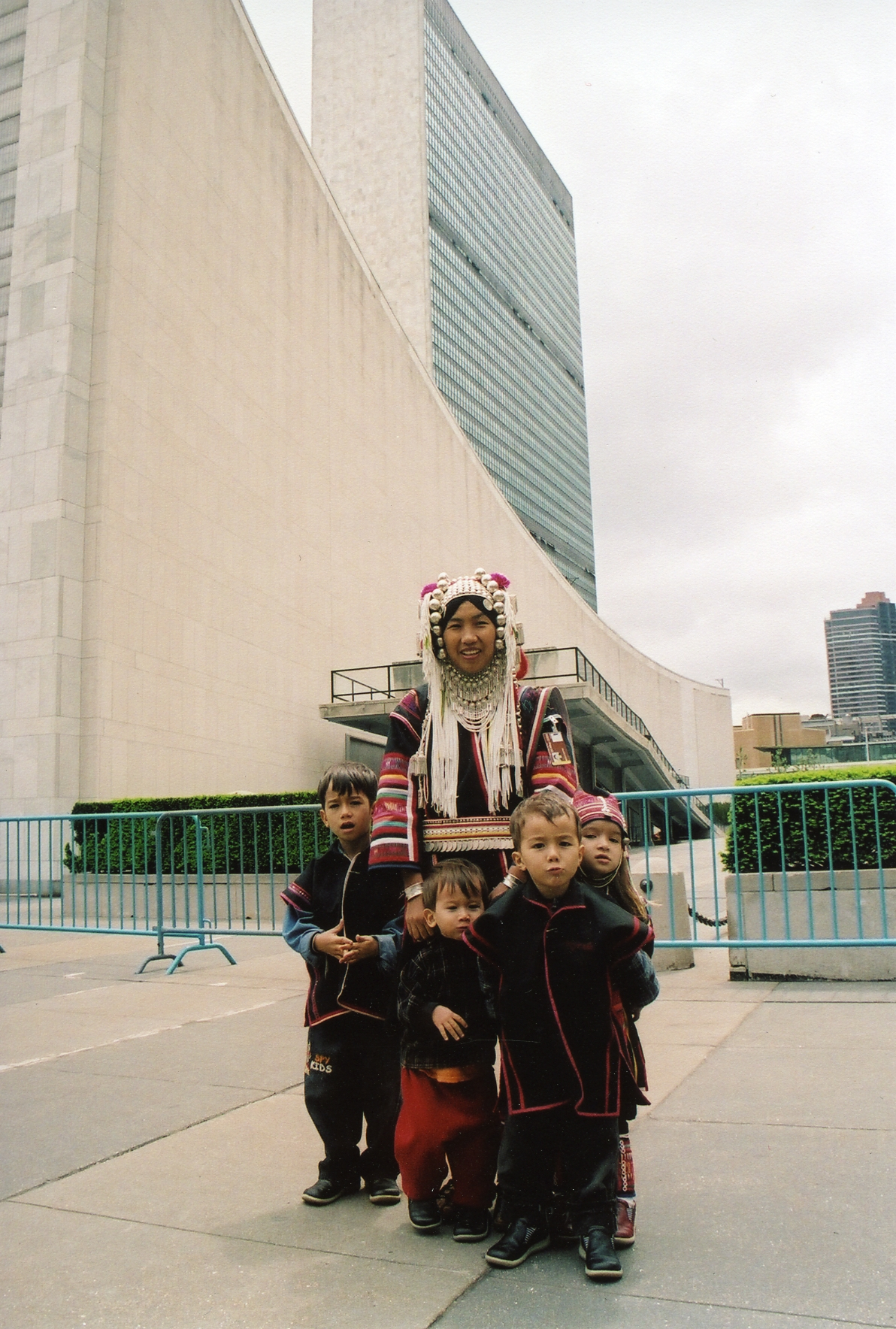

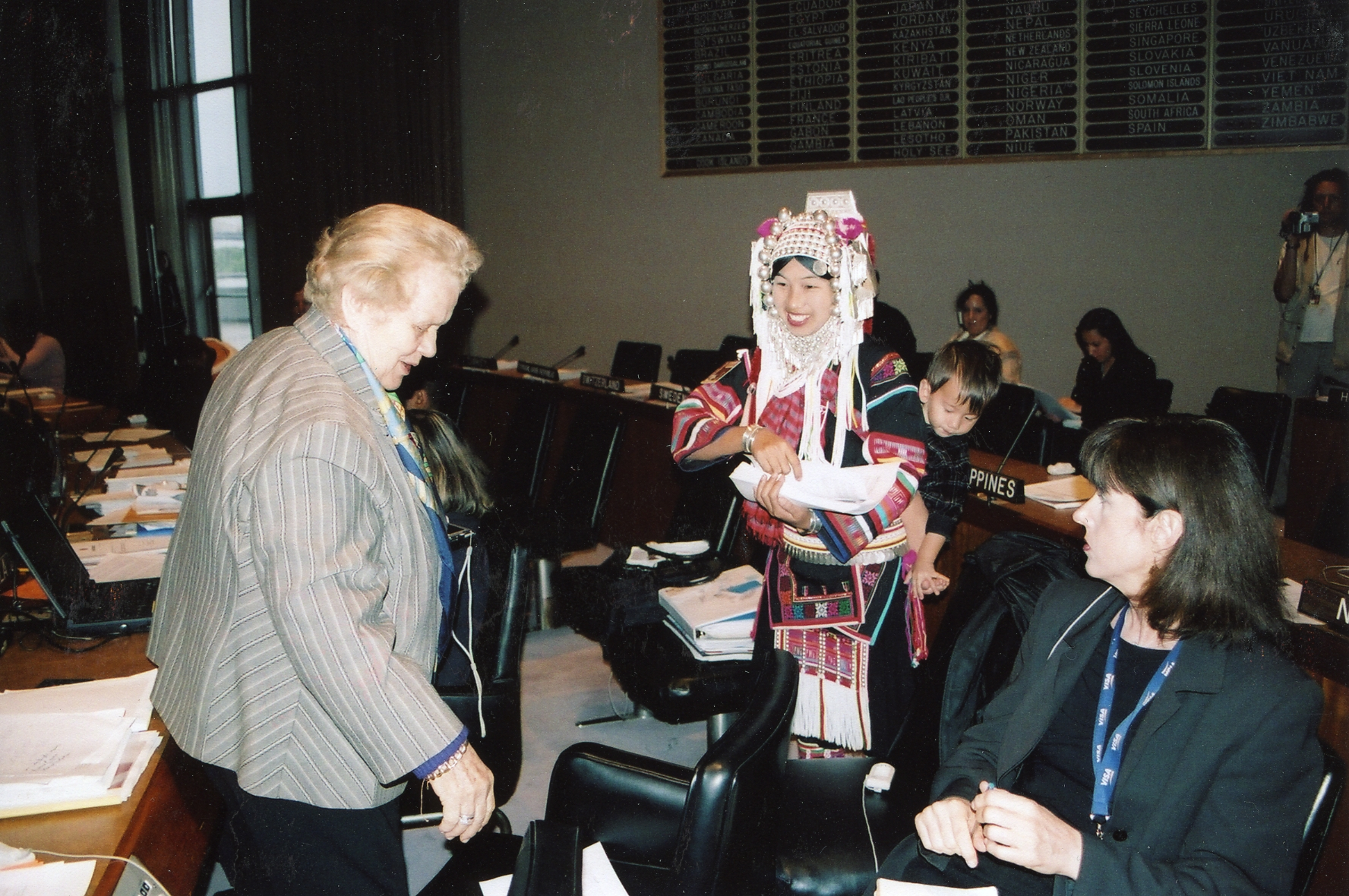

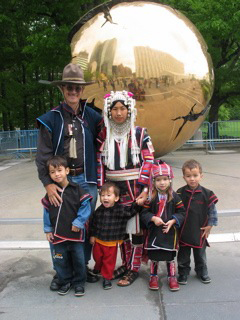

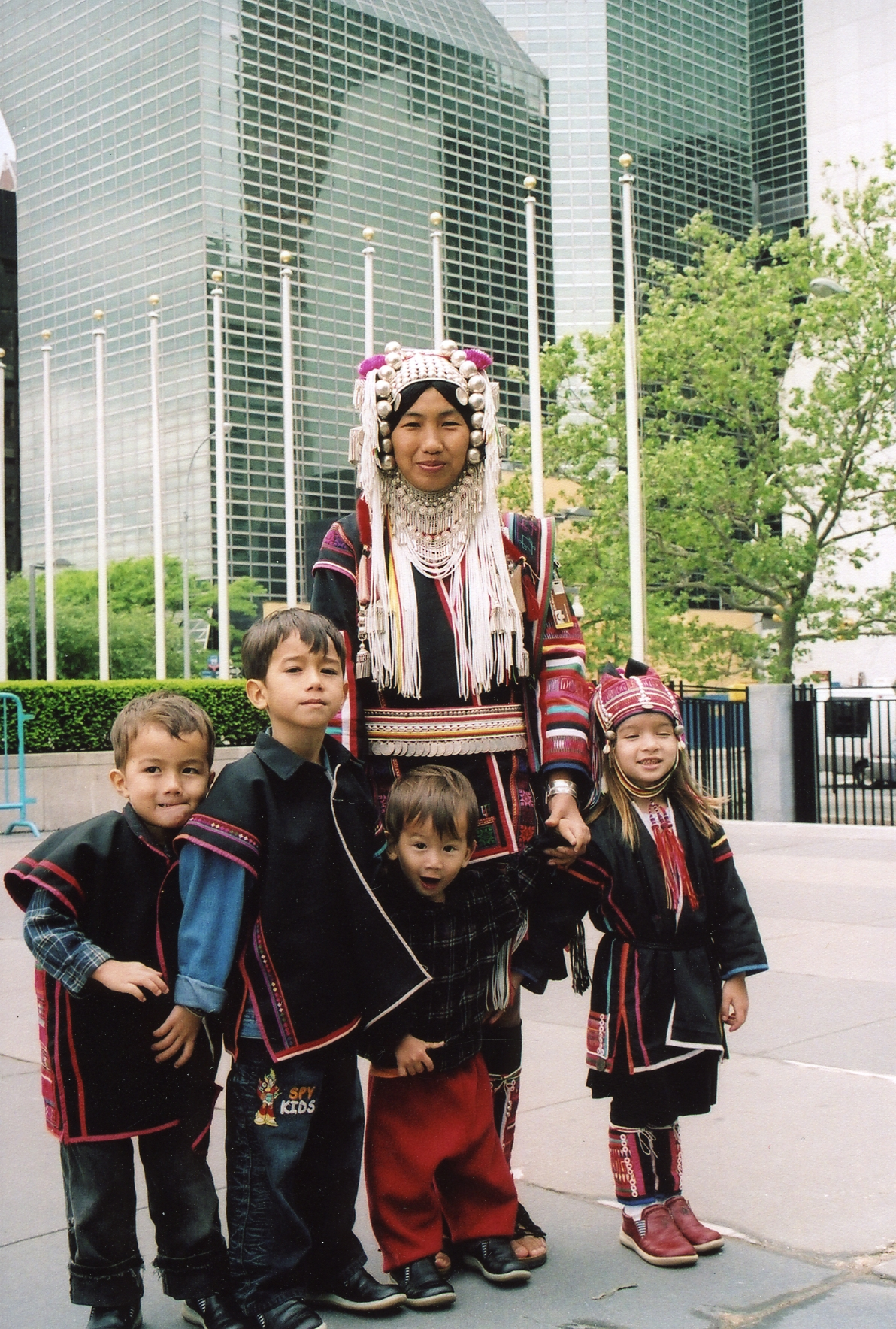

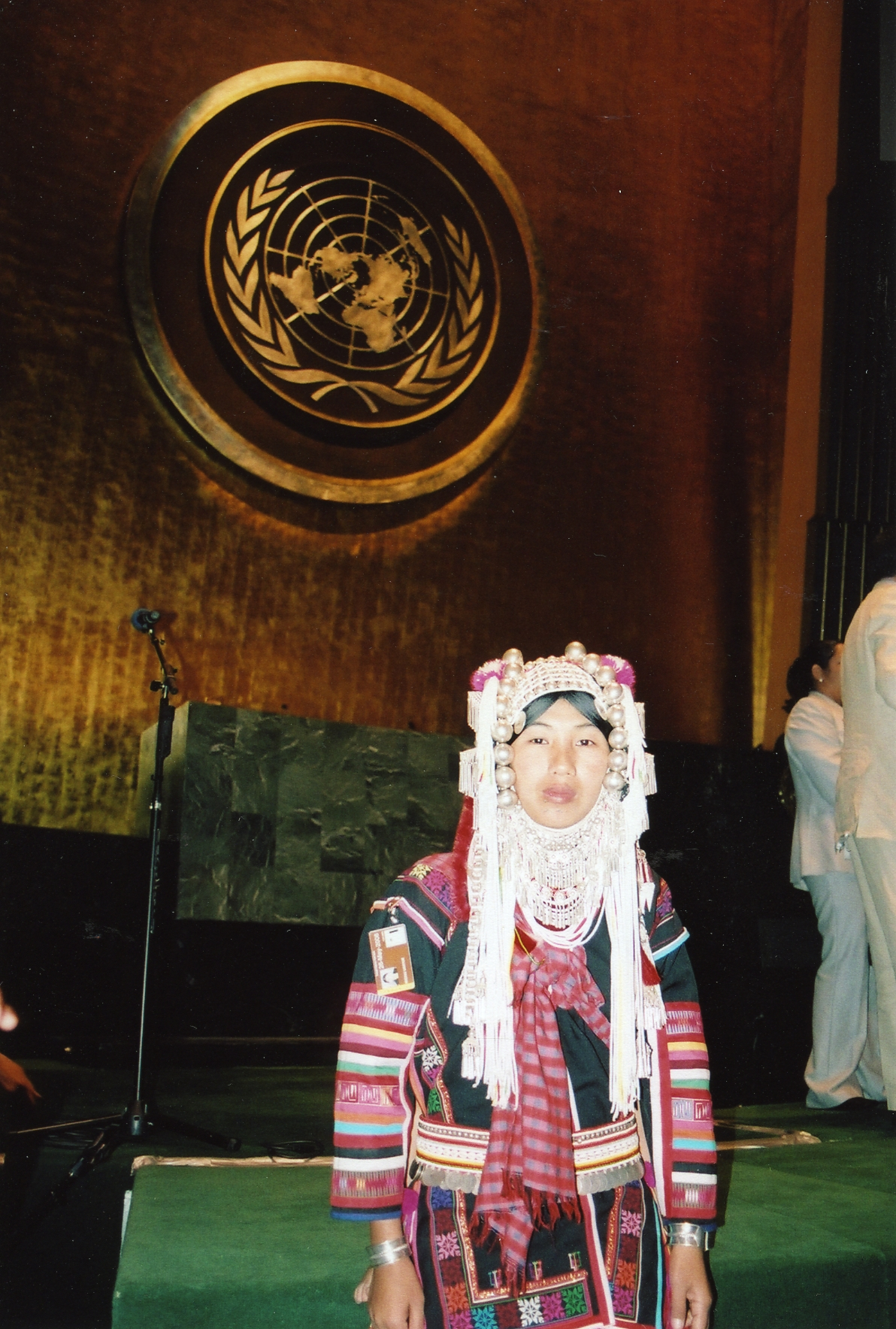

== Horseback ride across USA ==
A November 30, 2007 Keizertimes article reported that Matthew McDaniel would ride by horseback across the USA to raise awareness of the Akha. The article reported: "He plans to start his journey in Lincoln City, making his way to Los Angeles and New Orleans before finally ending up at the United Nations headquarters in New York City. All told he plans to travel some 4,500 miles. He said the ride could take seven months or more."

Here follows a quote from a November 30, 2007 Salem Monthly article (in Salem, Oregon):

The effort is "a commitment to the Akha people to protect their lands, to send a message to the Thai government that the Queen of Thailand needs to give back the land of the Akha, to raise public awareness and end the removal of children from their villages and families by missionaries," he said.

The McDaniel family's "Ride for Freedom" via horseback and bus began in Oregon March 6, 2009. On riding days McDaniel rode the horse, Hampton. He then hitchhiked back to a large touring-size bus where his family was located. There were found his Akha wife, Michu Uaiyue, and their 5 children aged 8 to 2. McDaniel then drove the bus to the horse. Then when ready he rode the horse another day. By May 5, 2009 the family had arrived in Half Moon Bay, California (20 miles south of San Francisco).

Hampton the horse is 17.2 hands high and eats 20 pounds of feed a day. A daily ride was around 20 to 25 miles, although they did 60 miles one day. McDaniel mapped the route with his iPhone. Concerning Hampton, he stated: "You have to make a deal with a horse. You can't fake it."

A May 13, 2009 Santa Cruz Sentinel article reported that McDaniel's web site included a journal of the trip. The article also stated:

Using her husband as a translator, Michu declares: "Until the queen gives our land back, people should keep talking about this."

The Akha Heritage Foundation web site links to McDaniel's official YouTube channel that has many videos of the ride. On day 300 (Dec. 30, 2009) McDaniel was in Murfreesboro, Tennessee, and had Hampton's horseshoes replaced again.

On day 382 (Monday, March 22, 2010) McDaniel arrived in New York City. The Keizertimes reported: "By noon he had hit Times Square, Rockefeller Center, the United Nations and finally Central Park, where he had arranged for someone to pick up him and his horse for a respite in rural New Jersey."

The next step is the United Nations Permanent Forum on Indigenous Issues in New York City in April 2010.
