= Thai highlands =

Thai Highlands
- Natural region
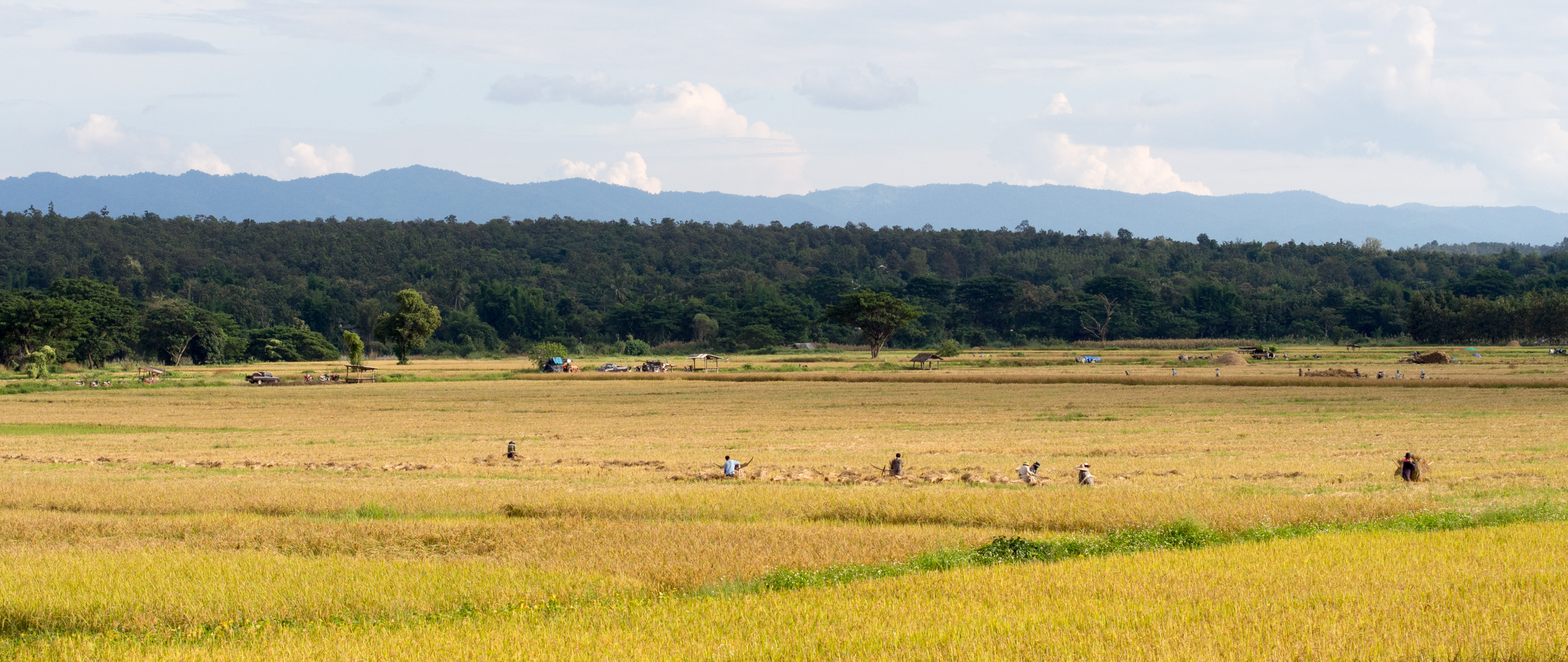
- Rice being harvested in Wang Nuea District, Lampang province. The mountains in the background are part of the Phi Pan Nam Range.

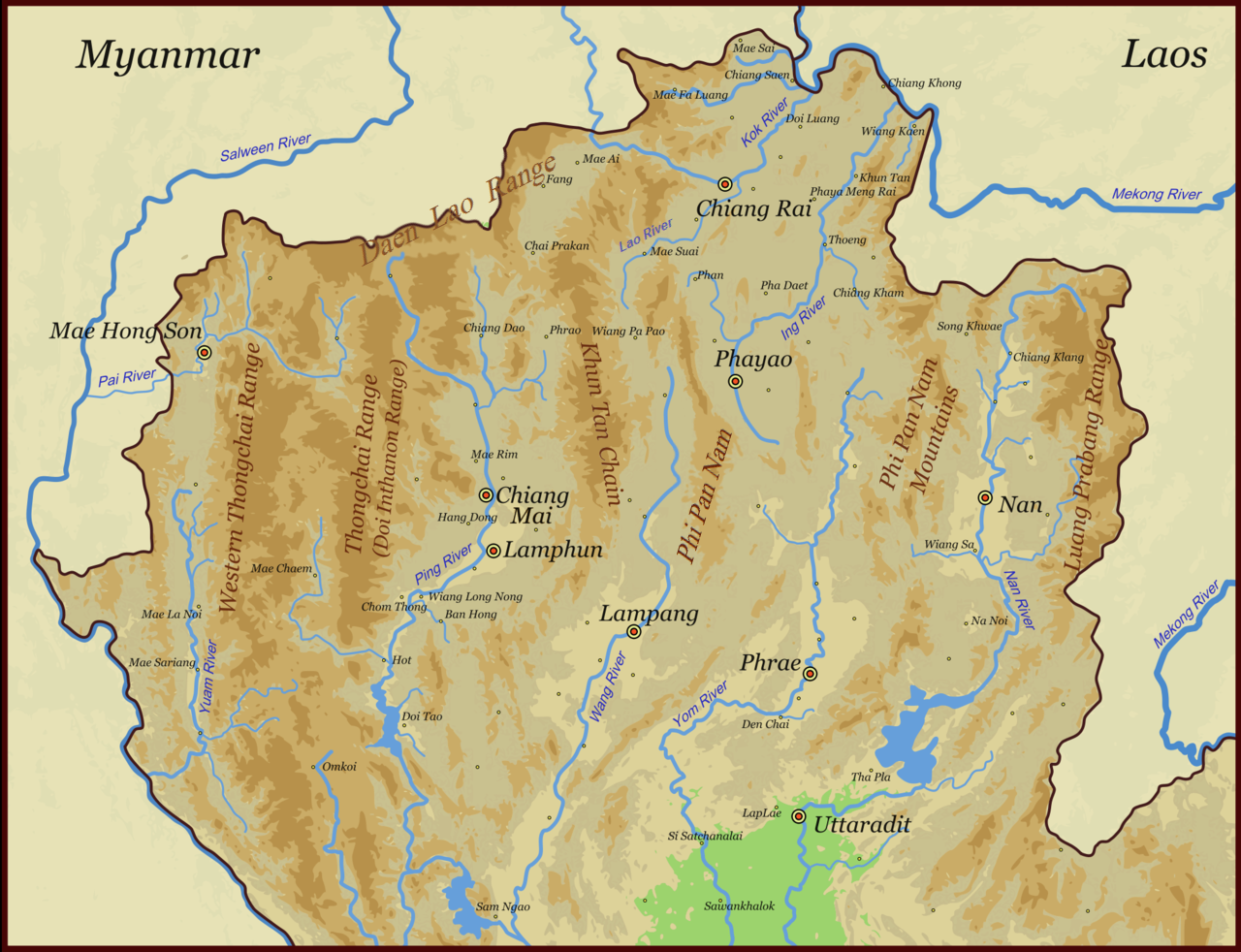
- Map of the Thai highlands
- Coordinates: 18°30′00″N 98°30′00″E
- Country: Thailand
- Area: Northern Thailand, and parts of Tak and Sukhothai provinces

Area
  - Total: 107,000 km^{2} (41,000 sq mi)

Population (2009)
  - Total: 6,300,000
  - Density: 59/km^{2} (150/sq mi)
- Time zone: UTC+7 (ICT)

The Thai highlands or hills of northern Thailand is a mountainous natural region in the north of Thailand. Its mountain ranges are part of the system of hills extending through Laos, Burma, and China and linking to the Himalayas, of which they may be considered foothills.

The highlands in the north of Thailand are characterized by a pattern of generally steep hill ranges, intermontane basins and alluvial gorges. Elevations are generally moderate, little above 2,000 metres (6,600 ft) for the highest summits. There is a wide range of elevations though, with floors ranging between 200 and 500 metres (660 and 1,640 ft) above sea level. Towards the Lao border, the divide to the Mekong basin becomes higher with peaks occasionally rising above 1,500 metres (4,900 ft) and streams flowing in narrow steep valleys.

The climate is typical of tropical mountains with clearly delineated wet and dry seasons. Winter temperatures can be cool with frosts occurring most years at higher elevations, but no snow even on the highest peaks.

The region of the Thai Highlands encompasses the nine administrative provinces of northern Thailand, based on the six-region system, as well as parts of Tak and Sukhothai Provinces.

Some areas of the highlands are sparsely populated.

== Geography ==
Except for the Daen Lao Range (ทิวเขาแดนลาว) at the far northern edge, all ranges in the north of Thailand are roughly aligned from north to south. They are linked to a wide system of ranges in neighboring Burma and Laos that do not have a specific name for the whole, "Thai highlands" being the term generally restricted to the Thai area. Broadly defined, and based on their geological composition, there are two mountainous subsystems in Northern Thailand:

- In the western part the ranges stretching southwards from the Daen Lao Range, in the southern region of the Shan Hills or Shan Highland, with the two parallel mountain chains of the Thanon Thong Chai Range (เทือกเขาถนนธงชัย). This area has the highest elevations, with Doi Inthanon, the highest point in Thailand, reaching 2,565 metres (8,415 ft). The Dawna Range (ทิวเขาดอยมอนกุจู) forms the western border of Thailand between Mae Hong Son and the Salween River.
- The remaining mountainous region of parallel ranges that extend into northern Laos includes the Khun Tan Range (ทิวเขาขุนตาน), the Phi Pan Nam Range (ทิวเขาผีปันน้ำ), the Phlueng Range (ทิวเขาพลึง) as well as the western part of the Luang Prabang Range (ทิวเขาหลวงพระบาง).

A great part of the highland area is drained by rivers Ping, Wang, Yom and Nan, all tributaries of the Chao Phraya River flowing in a roughly southern direction. The ranges separating the main rivers are generally steep, high and continuous. Towards the east, as well as in the Wang and Yom drainage basins, they are lower. The Pai River in the northwest flows westwards into the Salween and the northeastern part is drained by rivers of the Mekong basin, like the Kok and Ing.

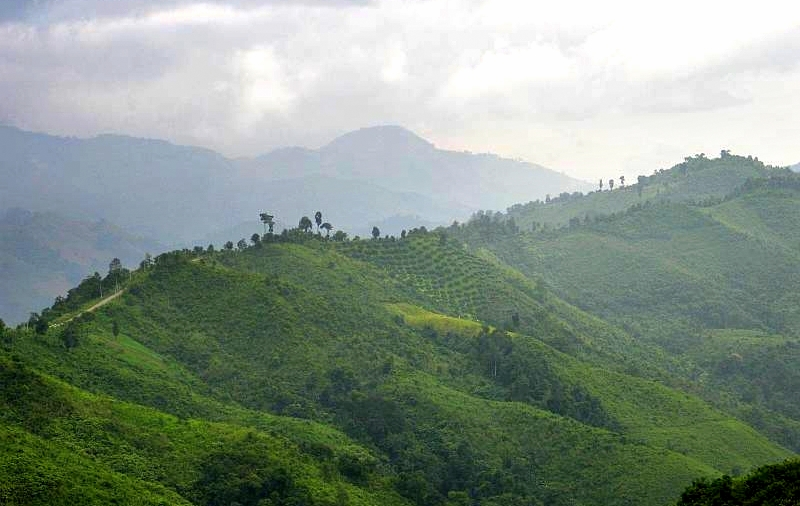
Doi Phu Kha area, Nan Province at the eastern end close to the Lao border

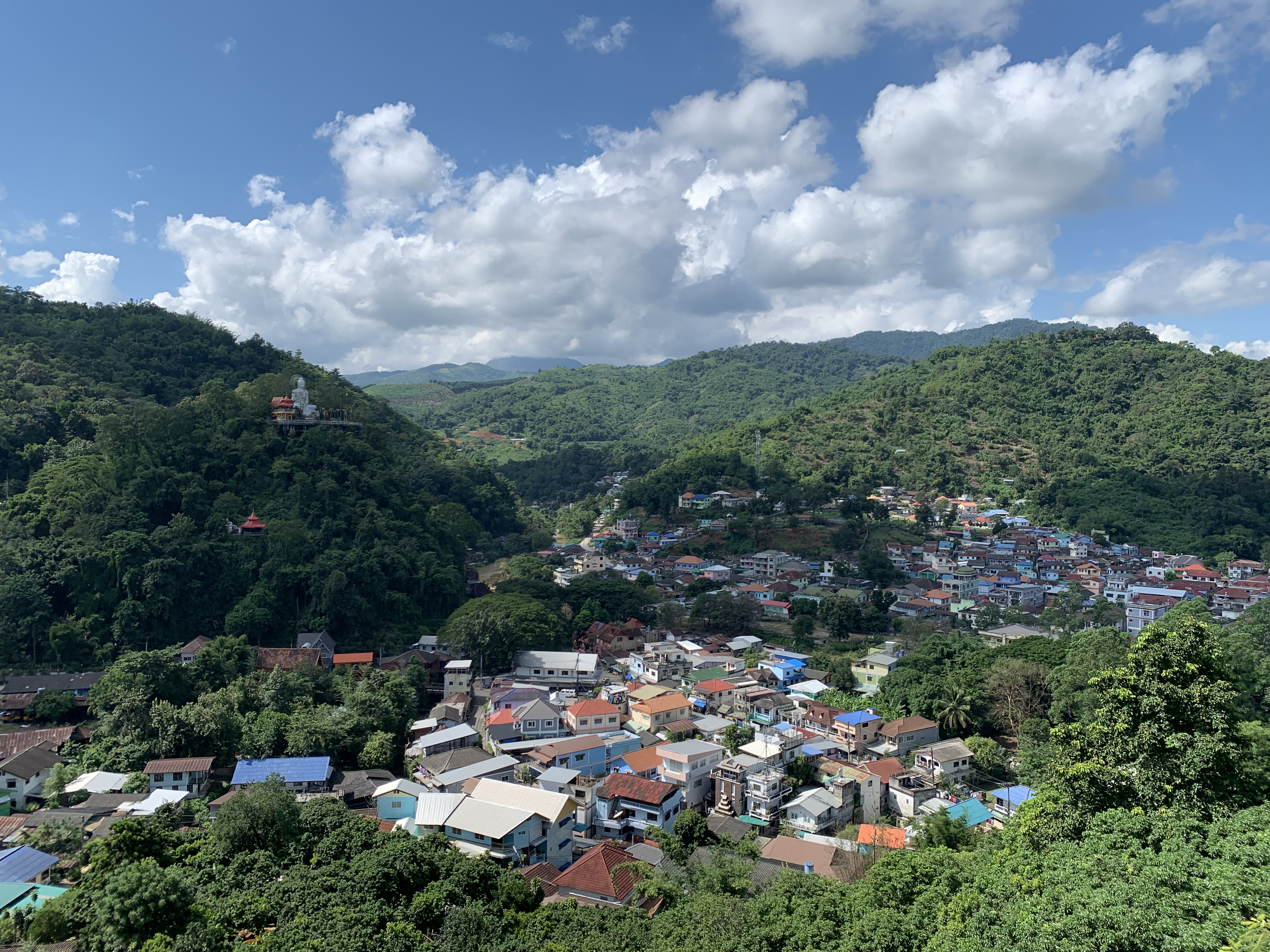
Wat Phra That Doi Wao and the Daen Lao Range

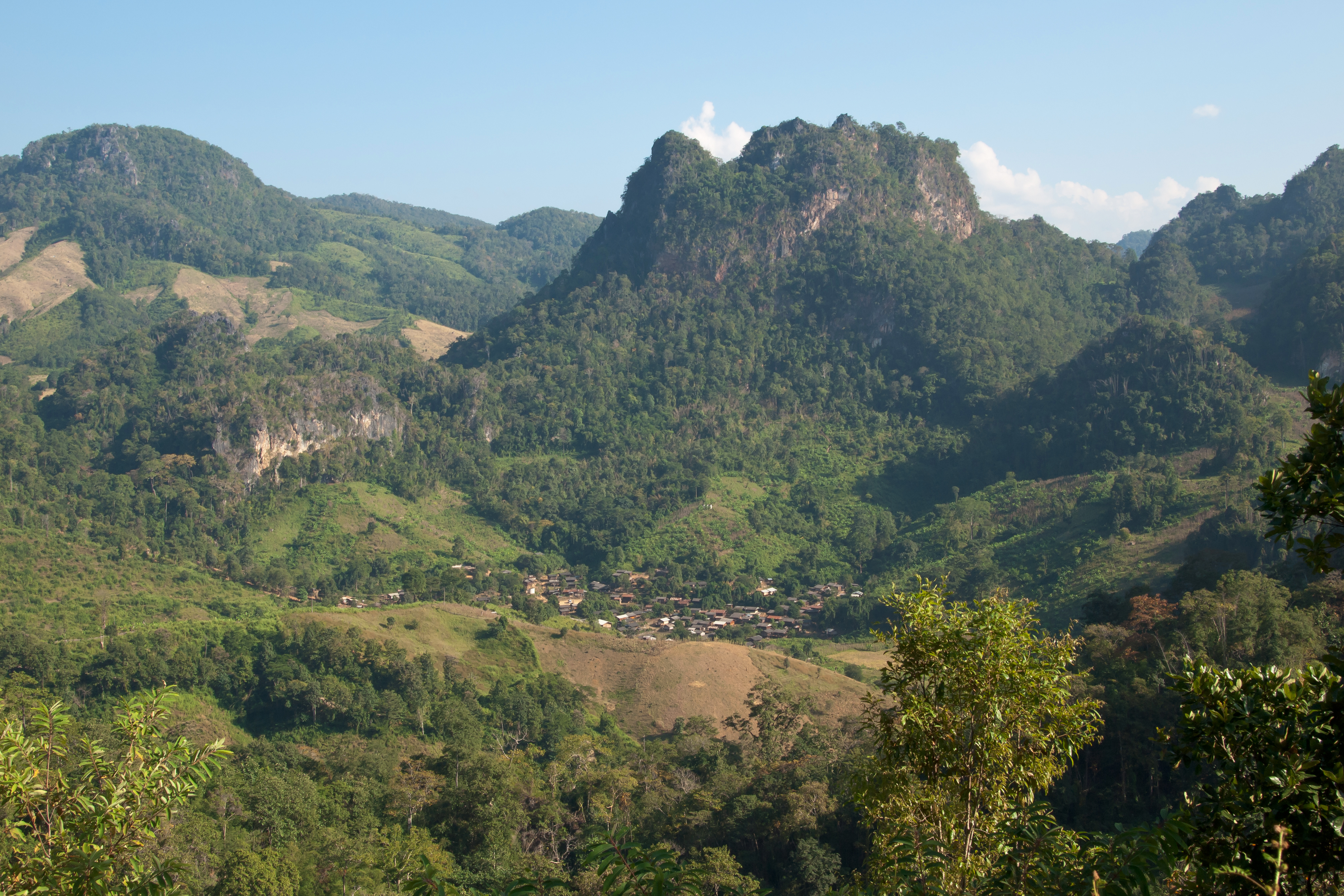
Hills, Mae Hong Son Province at the west end of the highlands

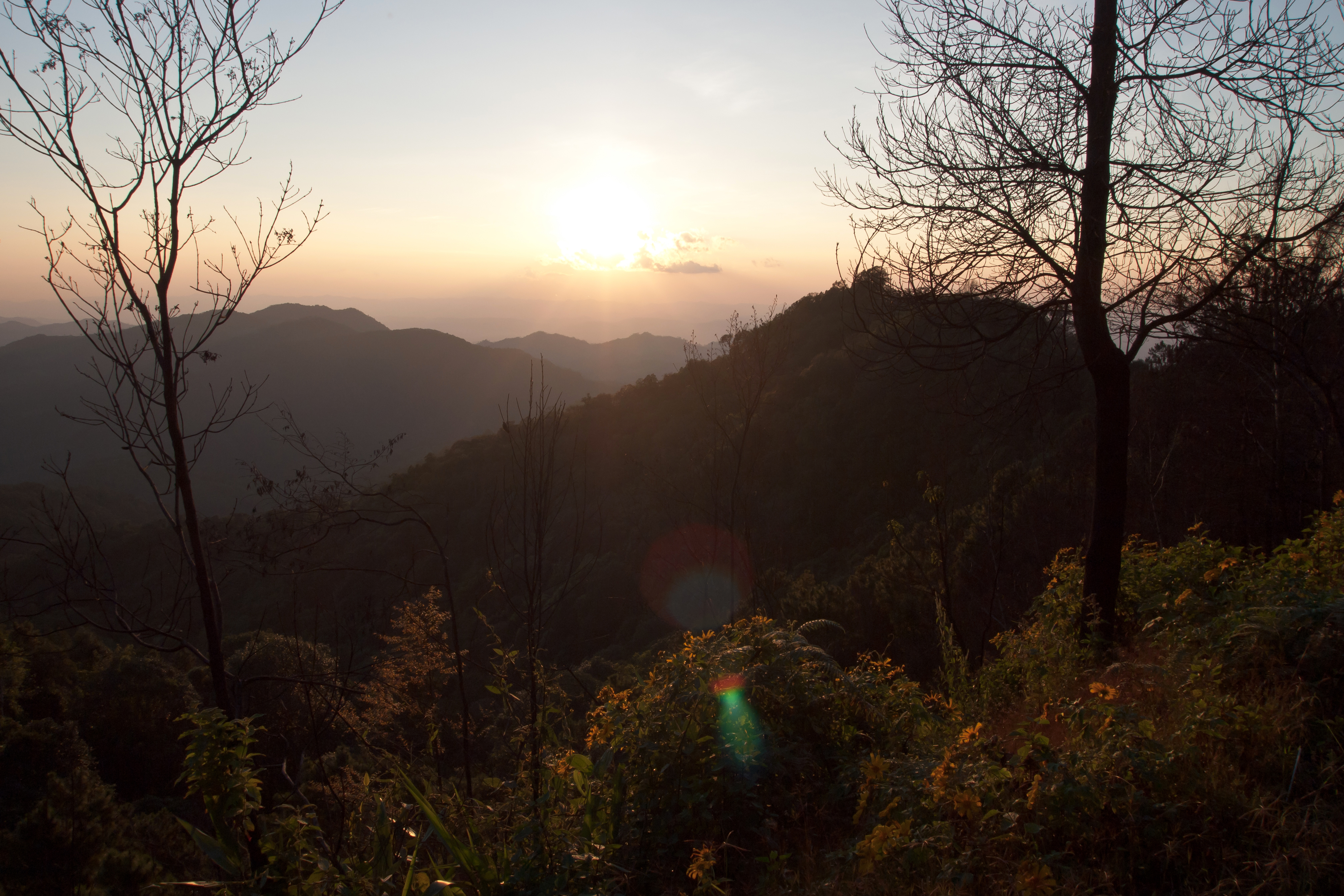
Namtok Mae Surin National Park, Mae Hong Son Province

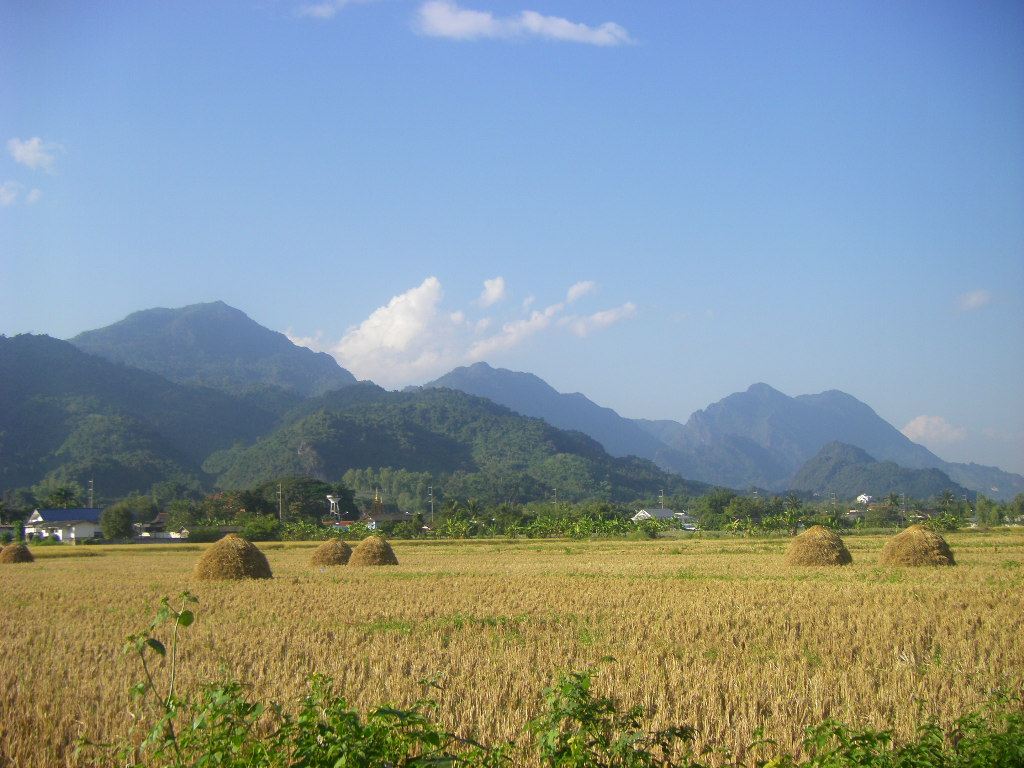
Doi Nang Non, "Mountain of the Sleeping Lady"

== Geology ==
Geologically in the southern subranges of the Shan Hills layers of alluvium are superimposed on hard rock. The ranges closer to Laos consist of Permo-Carboniferous limestone, which makes for a more jagged and steep relief, despite the more moderate height. Most of the Thai highlands are part of the Shan-Thai Terrane, a tectonic plate.

== Environment and human impact ==
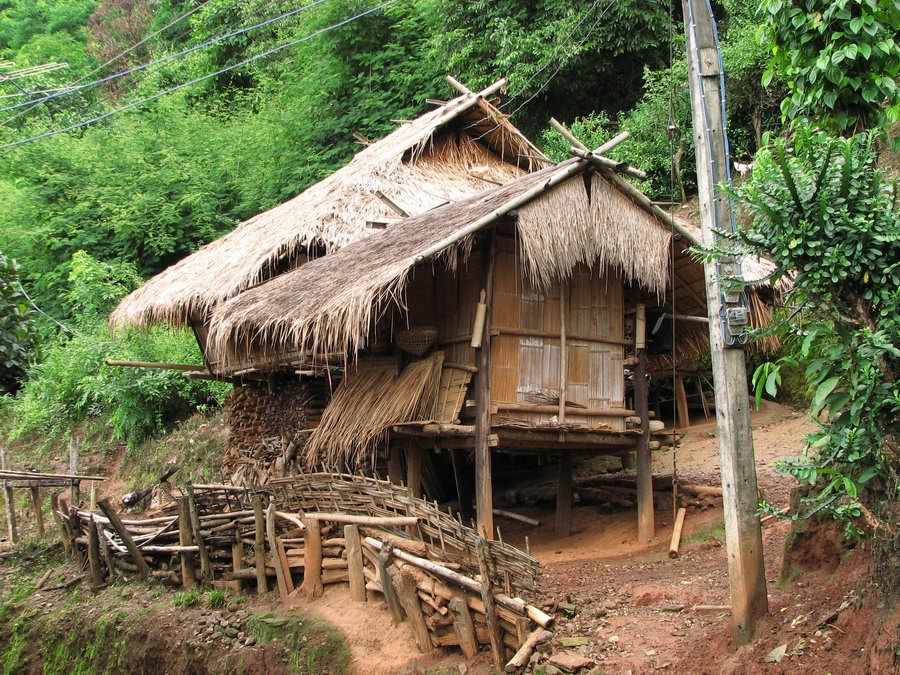
Akha hut in the hills near Chiang Rai

The natural environment of the hills used to be dense montane rain forest. Swidden agricultural practices and logging have much reduced the old-growth forest areas which have been replaced by secondary forest.

For centuries the Thai highlands have been inhabited with hill tribes mostly from Chinese or Tibeto-Burman descent, such as the Akha, Yao, Lahu, Khmu, Hmong and Lisu. These human groups immigrated into this relatively empty region fleeing persecution or harsh central rule in their respective environments, as well as seeking new land for their shifting agricultural productions system. For the past decades these groups have been undergoing a process of integration into the Thai mainstream.

Owing to the unrest in Burma, some refugee camps have been established for cross-border refugees in the Thai highlands. Certain Kayah and Karen communities, like the "long-necked Karen", are regularly visited by organized tourist groups.

At higher elevations, above 1,000 metres (3,300 ft), one of the main crops was opium until the 1990s, when the combined effects of development became evident—from the construction of roads into the remote area, increasingly efficient policing, and opium replacement programs.

Yearly wildfires are started by local farmers during the dry season in different areas of northern Thailand. Often speculators also hire people to set forests on fire in order to claim land title deeds for the areas that, post-fire, become "degraded forest". The smoke produced by these fires is the main cause of the intense seasonal air pollution in the Thai highlands, also known as the "northern haze". Fires also contribute to the floods in the country by denuding forest undergrowth and the dry forest soil leads to lower water intake for the trees to extract when the rains arrive.

Presently large tracts of the mountains are covered with a mixed vegetation resulting from the capacity of the efficient shifting agricultural system being exceeded. As a result, large areas end up becoming dominated by Imperata cylindrica grass, which is used throughout Thailand as roofing material. Cattle can graze on the grass to an extent, as agricultural science research in the 1970s showed. The longer term environmental care of the region is associated with forestry and in the lower reaches, perennial fruit like peaches and other trees. Some projects for the restoration of forest cover have been undertaken in ecologically degraded areas.

== See also ==
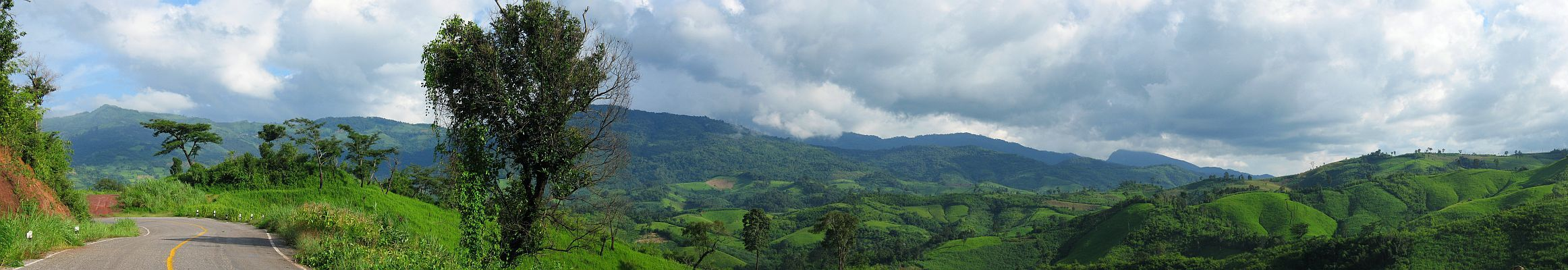
Doi Phu Chi Fa, Amphoe Wiang Kaen, Chiang Rai province.

- Doi Inthanon, the highest mountain in Thailand
- Doi Nang Non, a karstic formation in Chiang Rai province
- Golden Triangle (Southeast Asia)
- Deforestation in Thailand
- Highland People Discovery Museum in Chiang Mai
- Western Forest Complex
- Southeast Asian Massif
