= List of hill tribes of Thailand =

The following contains a list of hill tribes of Thailand. Hill people are people who live in the hills and mountains. There are hill people around the world, many of whom live in stone houses and herd goats, sheep or camelids or have small farms. Thailand is a country located at the centre of the Indochina peninsula in Southeast Asia. About 75% of the population is ethnically Thai, 14% is of Chinese origin, and 3% is ethnically Malay; the rest belong to minority groups including Mons, Khmers and various hill tribes.

== List ==
- Akha
  - Hanhi
  - Ikaw
  - Kaw
- Bisu
- Gong
- Hani
- Hmong or Miao
  - Maew
  - Meo
  - Mong
- Karen
  - Karen Bwé
  - Karen Pwo
  - Karen Skaw (S'gaw)
- Lahu
  - Cosung
  - Muhso
  - Musor
  - Mussor
  - Musur
- Lawa and Lua
- Lisu
  - Lisaw
  - Lishaw
- Myaung
- Mpi
- Yao
  - Dao
  - Mien
- Palaung people
- Yau
- Yumbri
- Yaung
