= Hill tribe (Thailand) =

Various ethnic minorities mostly living in the Thai highlands

"Hill tribe" (Thai: ชาวเขา, pronounced [tɕʰāːw kʰǎw]; Northern Thai: จาวดอย, คนดอย, pronounced [tɕāːw dɔ̄ːj, kʰōn dɔ̄ːj]; 'mountain people/folk') is a term used in Thailand to encompass some of the ethnic groups who mostly inhabit the high mountainous northern and western regions of Thailand, including both sides of the border areas between northern Thailand, Laos and Burma, the Phi Pan Nam Range, the Thanon Range, the latter a southern prolongation of the Shan Hills, as well as the Tenasserim Hills in Western Thailand.

== Terminology ==
In the 19th century, the tribes living in the mountain ranges were the largest non-Buddhist group in Thailand. Their mountain locations were then considered remote and difficult to access. In Thai official documents, the term hill tribe (chao khao) began to appear in the 1960s. This term highlights a "hill and valley" dichotomy that is based on ancient social relationships existing in most of northern and western Thailand, as well as in Sipsongpanna and Northern Vietnam. For the most part, the Dai/Tai/Thai people occupied the more fertile intermontane basins and the valleys, while the less powerful groups lived in the poorer, higher elevations. This dichotomy was often also characterized by a master/serf relationship.

In 1959, the government of Thailand established the Hill Tribe Welfare Committee under the Ministry of the Interior; nine ethnic groups (Akha, Hmong, Htin, Iu-Mien, Karen, Khamu, Lahu, Lisu and Lua) were officially recognized as Chao Khao or “Hill Tribes” at that time. By 2004, these groups and other ethnic minorities like Kachin, Dara’ang, Mlabri and Shan came to be called Klum chatiphan Chao khao or “Ethnic Hill tribes”.

The International Work Group for Indigenous Affairs views 'hill tribe' as a derogatory term, and considers these groups to be Indigenous peoples. "Highland Thais" is a more recent term also used to designate groups living in the mountainous areas.

== Social issues ==
The hill dwelling peoples have traditionally been primarily subsistence farmers who use shifting cultivation techniques to farm their heavily forested communities. Popular perceptions that slash-and-burn practices that form part of this cultivation method are environmentally destructive, governmental concerns over borderland security, and population pressure has caused the government to forcibly relocate many hill tribe peoples. Traditionally, hill tribes were a migratory people, leaving land as it became depleted of resources. Cultural and adventure travel tourism resulting in visiting the tribal villages is an increasing source of income for the hill tribes.

The mountain peoples are severely disadvantaged by comparison with the dominant Thai ethnic group. A 2013 article in the Bangkok Post said that "Nearly a million hill peoples and forest dwellers are still treated as outsiders—criminals even, since most live in protected forests. Viewed as national security threats, hundreds of thousands of them are refused citizenship although many are natives to the land". The Ministry of Social Development and Human Security's 2015 Master Plan for the Development of Ethnic Groups in Thailand 2015-2017 listed 13 mountain peoples and recognized problems in five areas, namely a lack of rights and uncertainty in housing, a lack of rights in legal status, a lack of stability in life, and weaknesses in bureaucratic planning. It sought to provide a planning framework to address these issues. The Master Plan was not renewed after 2017; it was 'subsumed' into planning by the Office of the National Security Council and by the Ministry of Culture.

== Main groups ==
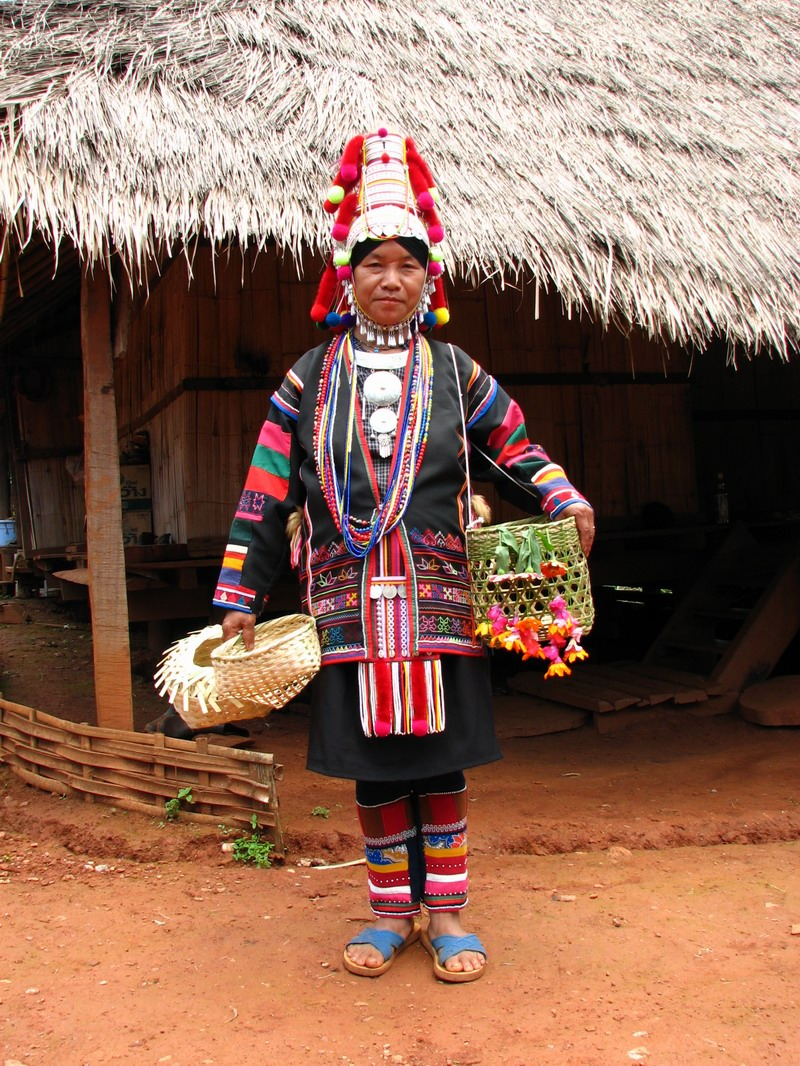
Akha tribeswoman wearing traditional dress, northern Thailand

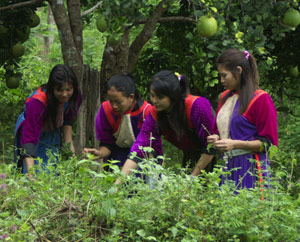
Lisu women, northern Thailand

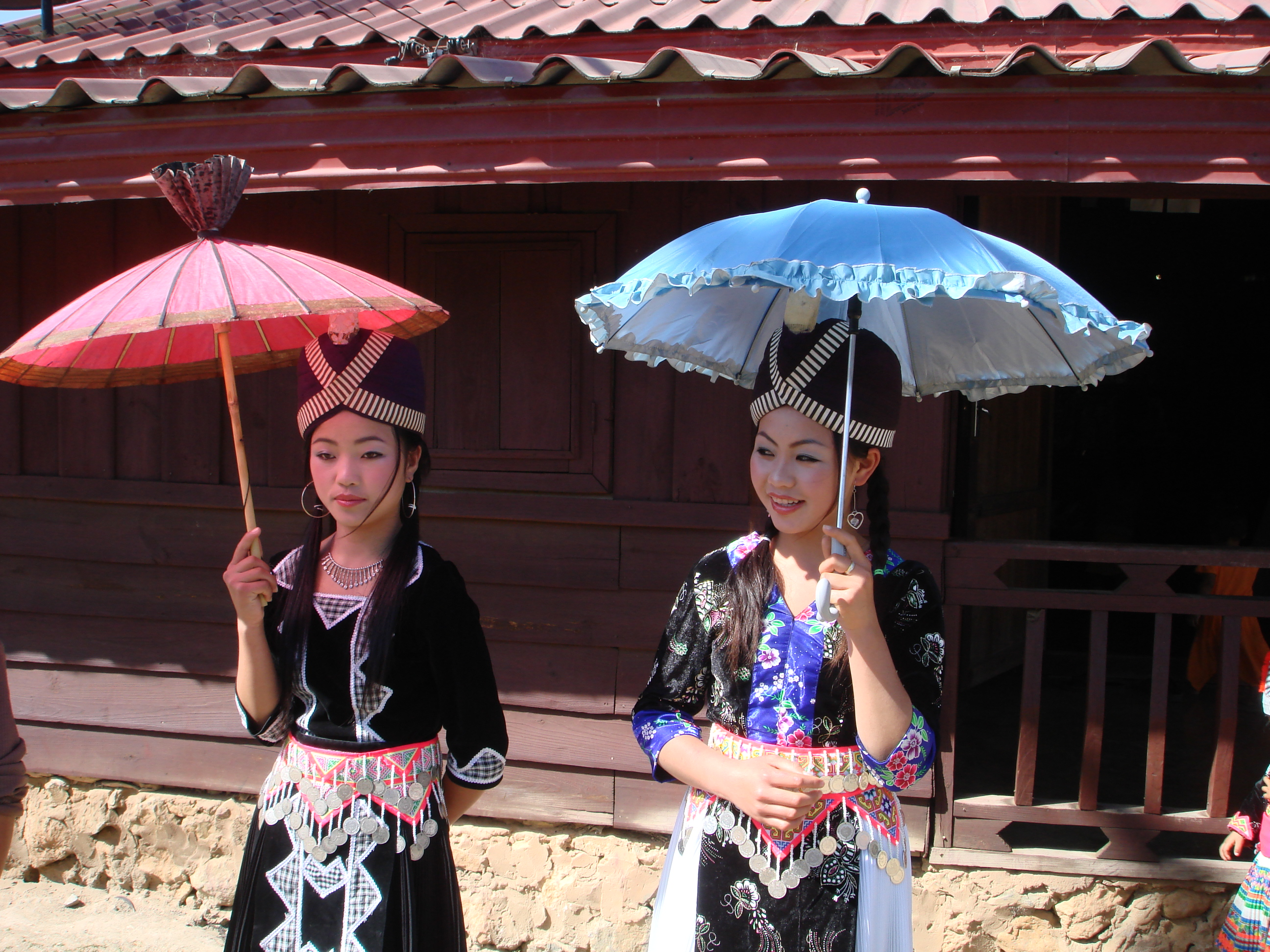
Hmong women celebrating New Year

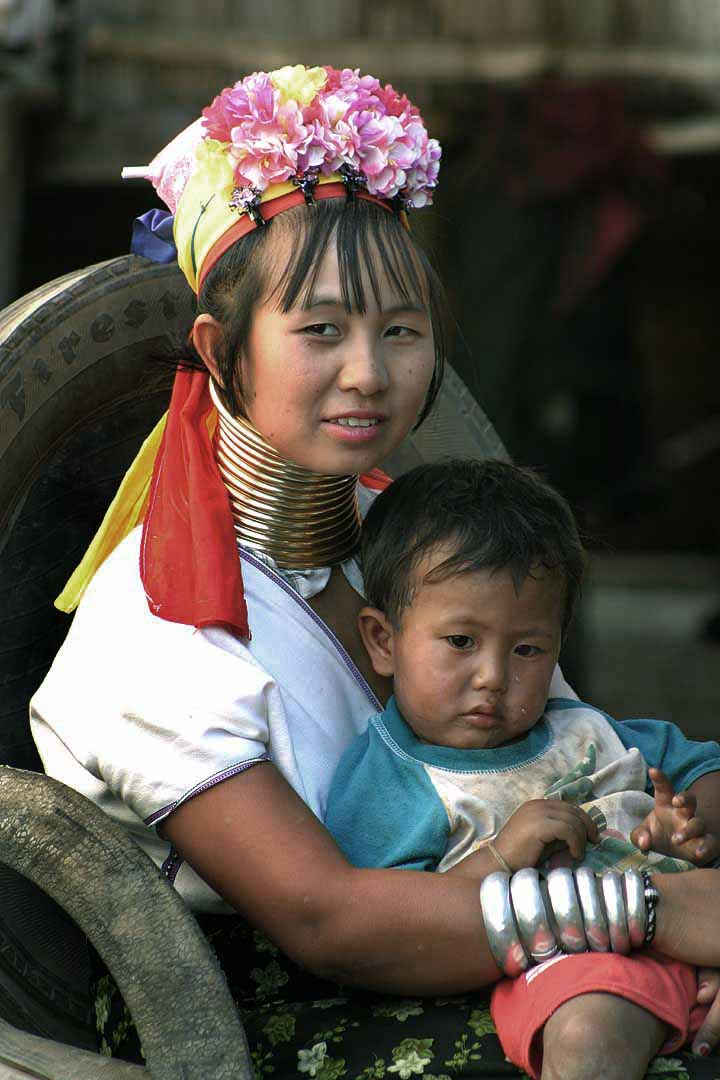
Long-necked Karen woman with child

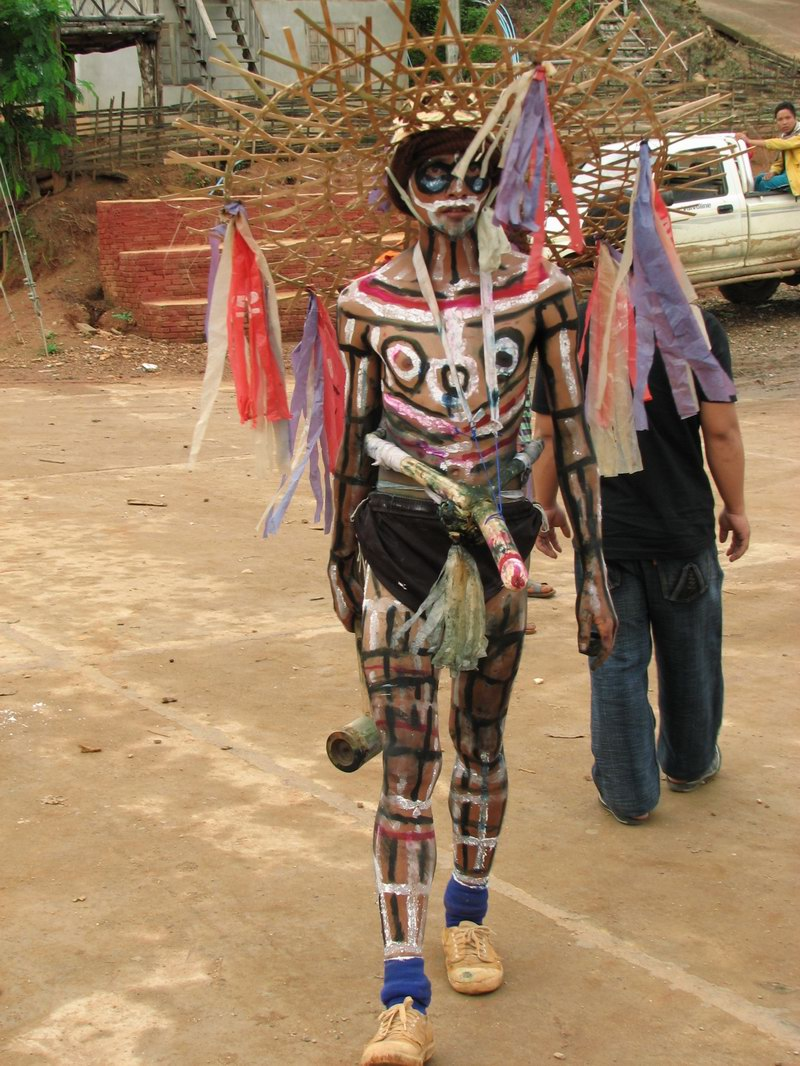
Akha exorcist at a village funeral

The nine main hill tribes officially recognised by the government in Thailand are the Akha, Lahu, Karen, Hmong, Mien/Yao, Lisu, Lua, Lawa, and Khamu. The Palaung are also sometimes included under this umbrella in official documents. Each of these groups has a distinct language and culture.

=== Akha ===
The Akha are closely related to the Hani of China's Yunnan province. They are also known derogatorily in Thai as the Gaw or the E-gaw. The Akha are one of the dominant cultural influences in the area. There are two to three million Akha and Akha-Hani in total, 70,000 of whom live in Thailand. The Akha speak a language in the Lolo/Yi branch of the Tibeto-Burman language group but have no traditional written language.

Although many Akha, especially the younger people, profess Christianity, Akha Zang ('The Akha Way') still runs deep in their consciousness. The Akha are a shamanic group that share the ancient universal archetype that the Goddess spins a universe where nature is not distinguished from humankind. They embody the essence of its consciousness into a holistic continuum where there is no dichotomy between themselves and the natural world. The Akha Way, a prescribed lifestyle derived from religious chants, combines animism, ancestor worship, shamanism and a deep relationship with the land. The Akha Way emphasizes rituals in everyday life and stresses strong family ties and the hymn of creation; every Akha male can recount his genealogy back over fifty generations to the first Akha, Sm Mi O.

=== Karen ===
The K’nyaw (S'gaw Karen: ကညီ), known to many as Karen and to others as Kariang or Yang, are one of the largest hill tribes in Southeast Asia. The approximately 320,000 Karen in Thailand comprise half of the country's total hill tribe population.

=== Lisu ===
The Lisu people (Lisu: ꓡꓲ‐ꓢꓴ ꓫꓵꓽ; Burmese: လီဆူလူမျိုး, [lìsʰù]; Chinese: 傈僳族; pinyin: Lìsùzú; Thai: ลีสู่) are a Tibeto-Burman ethnic group who inhabit mountainous regions of Myanmar (Burma), southwest China, Thailand, and the Indian state of Arunachal Pradesh.

== Recent Citizenship Reforms and Statelessness ==
As of June 30, 2025, the Thai government has launched a groundbreaking initiative dramatically speeding up the citizenship process for stateless ethnic minority groups, including many hill tribe peoples. Under the new policy, ethnic minorities previously waiting years to obtain Thai nationality can now receive citizenship within five days of applying. This effort targets nearly half a million stateless individuals scattered across Thailand, with the northern province of Chiang Rai, part of the Golden Triangle region long inhabited by hill tribes, having the highest number of stateless people—around 90,000. This reform aims to address long-standing bureaucratic inefficiencies that left many natives without legal status, restricting their access to healthcare, education, and legal protections.

== See also ==
- Ethnic groups in Thailand
- Highland People Discovery Museum
- Hill people
- List of hill tribes of Thailand
- Southeast Asian Massif
- Thai highlands
- Zomia (geography)

== Sources ==
- Morton, Micah F.; Baird, Ian G. (2019). "From Hill tribes to Indigenous Peoples: The localisation of a global movement in Thailand". Journal of Southeast Asian Studies. 50 (1). Cambridge University Press: 7–31. doi:10.1017/s0022463419000031. ISSN 0022-4634.
