= Hill people =

General demonym for people who live at elevation

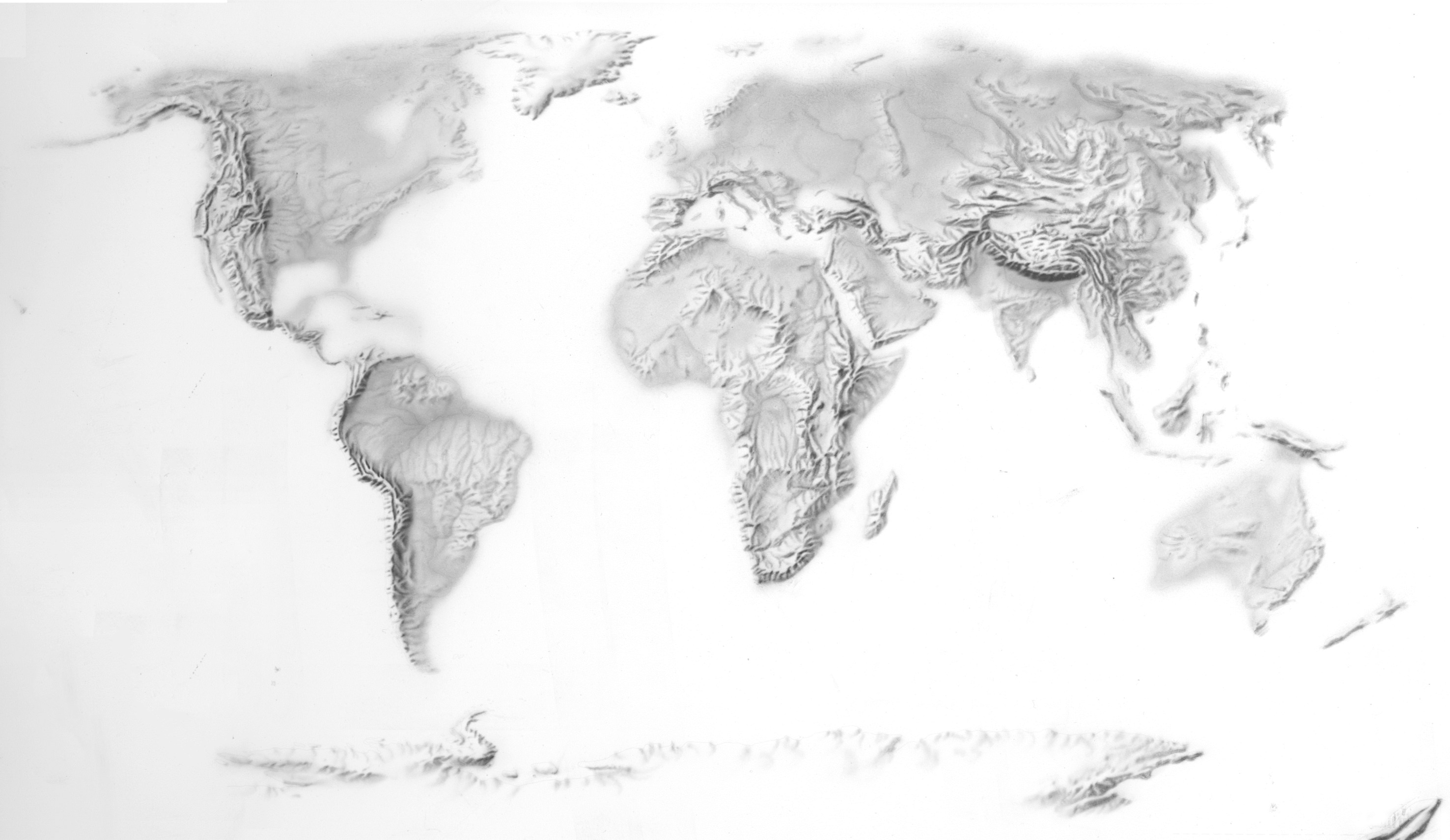
CIA hand-rendered terrain map of the world

Map of the diverse ethno-linguistic groups in the Caucasus region

Hill people, also referred to as mountain people, is a general term for people who live in the hills and mountains. This includes all rugged land above 300 metres (980 ft) and all land (including plateaus) above 2,500 metres (8,200 ft) elevation. The climate is generally harsh, with steep temperature drops between day and night, high winds, runoff from melting snow and rain that cause high levels of erosion and thin, immature soils.

People have used or lived in the mountains for thousands of years, first as hunter-gatherers and later as farmers and pastoralists. The isolated communities are often culturally and linguistically diverse. Today about 720 million people, or 12% of the world's population, live in mountain regions, many of them economically and politically marginalized. The mountain residents have adapted to the conditions, but in the developing world they often suffer from food insecurity and poor health. They depend on crops, livestock and forest products, and tend to be poor. In the developed world the mountain people are generally prosperous, and the mountains may be used for tourism and outdoor recreation. Mining is also widespread and dates back to the pre-Christian era.

In parts of the developing world the mountain communities depend on remittances from young men who have gone to work in the lowlands or overseas. Although 70% of mountain people live in rural areas, the rest live in cities, including large cities such as Mexico City, with a population of around 21 million. The cities attract temporary or permanent migrants from the rural areas. The smaller cities are more connected to the mountain culture and economy than the larger ones.

== Extent ==
Under the World Conservation Monitoring Centre (WCMC) classification, mountain regions include both hills and mountains. See "Classes of mountain region" for the formal definition. 22% of the world's land, or 29,000,000 square kilometres (11,000,000 sq mi) is classified as a mountain region, of which about half is below 1,000 metres (3,300 ft). Rugged land is considered a mountain region if it is at least 300 metres (980 ft) above sea level, but plateaus and broad valleys running through the mountains below 2,500 metres (8,200 ft) are not considered mountain regions. All land above 2,500 metres (8,200 ft) is classified as mountain, including plateaus. This accounts for 20% of the total. Mountain regions in a 2003 study by the Food and Agriculture Organization (FAO) of the United Nations follow the WCMC classification.

== Environment ==
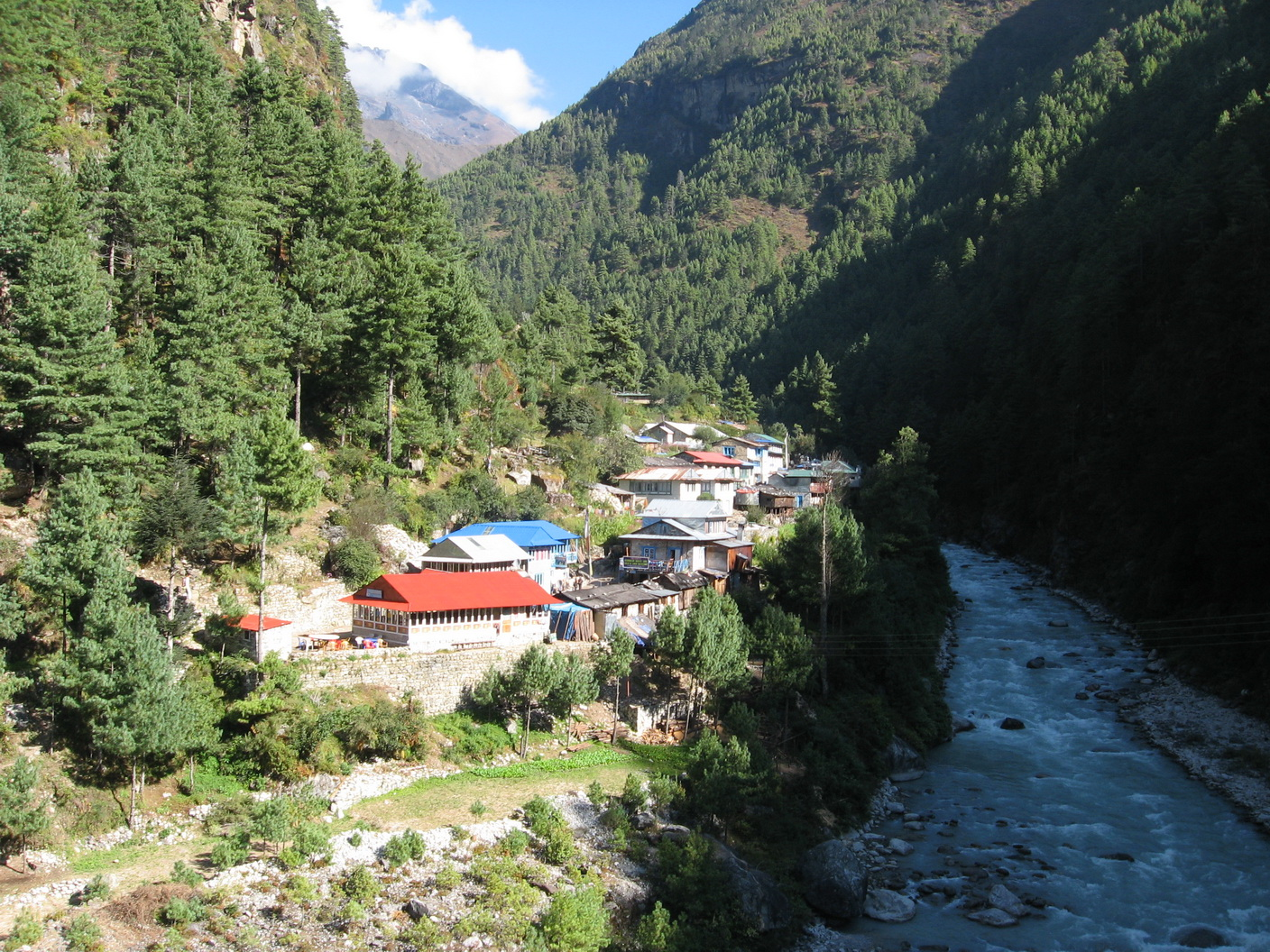
Jorsale village and the river Dudh Koshi in Nepal

Mountain environments vary depending on their latitude and their proximity to the edge of a landmass. The windward side will have greater rainfall than the leeward. The mountain environment can be harsh, particularly in the alpine regions above the tree line at higher elevations and in the drier climates outside the tropics. No more than 3% of world's land that is highly suitable for agriculture lies in the mountain regions.

Temperatures tend to always be high on the lower slopes near the equator, and there is often heavy rainfall year-round. Higher up and outside the tropics, temperatures can soar in the daytime and plummet at night. Usually there are strong winds, frequent freezing and thawing at the higher levels, snow, sleet and heavy rainfall in some areas, causing steady erosion. The thin soils on the slopes do not retain water, and only support drought-resistant plants. Often these plants are low and store energy in spreading roots, with relatively little vegetation above ground. This vegetation may be cleared for cultivation or road building, or may be overgrazed, resulting in rapid soil loss through erosion.

People have both adapted to mountain conditions and modified those conditions. For example, farmers in many areas use terracing to retain soil and water. Contour ploughing also helps stabilize the fragile soil. Often human activity has degraded the mountain environments. Humans have reduced biodiversity in many of the world's mountain regions. Areas with high biodiversity where the environment is under intense stress include California's montane ecoregions (California montane chaparral and woodlands), the mixed forest ecoregion in the Caucasus, and in northwest South America the Magdalena Valley montane forests, Magdalena–Urabá moist forests and Western Ecuador moist forests.

Almost 28% of the world's forests grow on mountains. Forests are important in regulating water flows and providing fuel and construction material. Before humans arrived, most mountains in tropical and temperate climates would have been forested up to the tree line. Deforestation is not new, and began 3,000 years ago in China. Mountain forests around the Mediterranean and in Britain had been cleared 1,500 years ago. More recently, in China and Europe there have been efforts to restore the mountain forests so as to reduce flooding and erosion.

The impact of climate change on mountain environments is not well understood, but they seem to be more sensitive than the lowlands. The higher-level ecosystems will be forced up the mountains as temperatures rise, shrinking in size and at some point disappearing. Threats include environmental stress during adaptation to higher mean annual temperatures, changes to precipitation patterns and more frequent extreme weather events. It is difficult to predict how well the mountain populations will adapt to changes in the resources on which they rely for subsistence, although it seems clear that there will be increased competition for use of the land for different purposes.

== Population ==
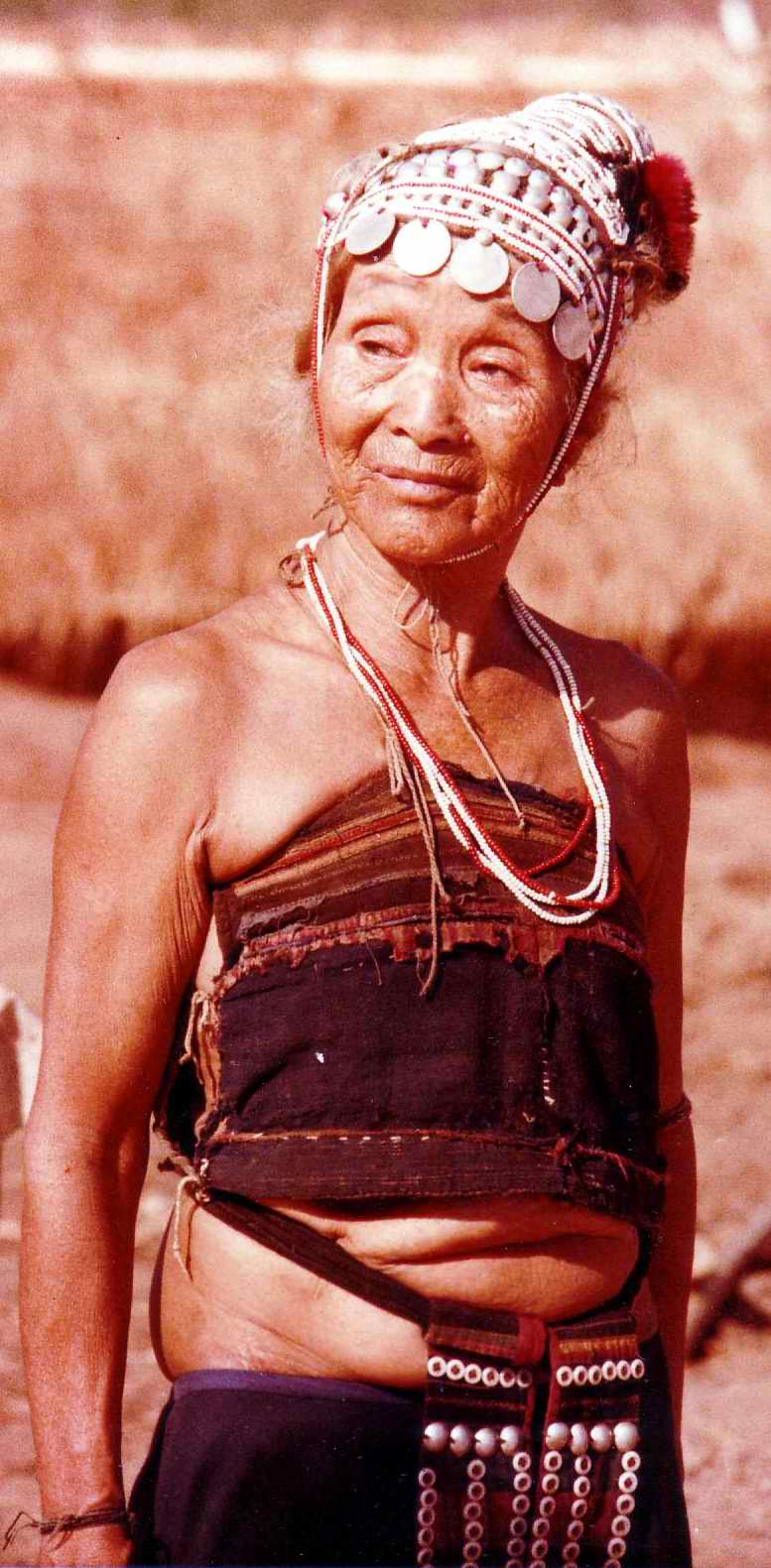
Elderly Akha woman, Northeast Thailand

=== Diversity ===
People have lived in mountain regions for thousands of years. Some may have sought refuge from persecution or from changing climate, while others may have migrated in search of food. New arrivals sometimes settled and developed prosperous farming communities. Streams, rivers and lakes that provide water for agriculture and domestic use are often found in valleys with flat ground suitable for cultivation of crops. These are prime locations for settlements. The streams could also be harnessed by mills to process grain. More recently they are used for hydroelectric plants, which provide overall social benefits but can be very disruptive locally.

The difficulty of movement between valleys in the past has isolated mountain communities and contributed to high levels of cultural diversity. Nearby communities may have different languages and dialects, traditions, costumes, cuisine and economic systems. This is seen in the Andes and the western mountains of Canada. In the central Karakoram there are speakers of Shina, Urdu, Waki and Burushaski. Many distinct dialects of French, German, Italian and Romansch are spoken in the Alps. The rugged mountains of the island of Papua New Guinea contain fertile valleys with temperate climates that are densely farmed using traditional techniques. The 7.6 million people of the island speak almost 1,300 languages, many of which are spoken by only a few hundred people.

The cultural groups that live in the mountains are often minorities within their countries, although they may be in the majority in their region. This is true of the Tibetans, Naxi, Miao, Yi and Uyghurs in China, the Kurds in the north of Iraq and the east of Turkey, the Amhars in Ethiopia and the Quechua and Aymara in the Andes. Often the mountain people are marginalized both politically and economically. The isolated mountain regions of the Atlas, Peru and Cuba have served as bases for guerrilla rebels.

While mountain areas are more isolated than lower or flatter lands, when measured by the percentage of the population that lives more than 5 kilometres (3.1 mi) from a road the difference is not great as might be expected. Thus in Ethiopia 50% of mountain people and 40% of non-mountain people live more than 5 kilometres from a road. In Afghanistan and China 30% of mountain people live more than 5 kilometres from a road, compared to 20% of non-mountain people. In Peru the respective ratios are 20% and 13%. Population densities in inaccessible places are usually similar to accessible places. In Ethiopia and Afghanistan they are higher. The mountain people want land that can be farmed using traditional methods more than ease of travel to distant places. However, the lack of roads may be seen as evidence of discrimination.

=== Present situation ===
Today, new transport and communications technologies are bringing goods, services, infrastructure and information to even the most remote parts of the mountains. The mountain communities are being forced to integrate with the larger global society.

The Food and Agriculture Organization estimated in their 2003 report that around 720 million, or 12% of the world population, live in the mountains. Of these, no more than 10% are in developed countries. About half of all mountain people are in Asia, and there are large and rapidly growing populations in South and Central America. 70% live below 1,500 metres (4,900 ft), and less than 10% above 2,500 metres (8,200 ft). A very small number of people in the Himalayas and the Andes live permanently at elevations over 4,500 metres (14,800 ft). The countries with the highest percentages of mountain people are Bhutan (89%), Rwanda (75%), Lesotho (73%), Armenia (70%), Guatemala (64%), Costa Rica (63%) and Yemen (61%).

About 70% of the mountain population is rural and relies on farming, fishing and extraction from local forests. The permanent mountain population also includes itinerant mineral prospectors, miners, loggers, construction workers and others who move from place to place. Better roads and vehicles may allow these people to live permanently in a mountain community some distance from where they work. Forestry and traditional agriculture is declining in the mountain areas of Japan, Europe and the eastern United States as government subsidies are withdrawn. Outside Europe and Japan the human population in mountains is rising as they are used as refuges, sources of minerals, for tourism, and for commercial forestry, farming and animal husbandry. Colonization and immigration in the last 400 years have been causing steady population growth in formerly less populated mountain areas in Africa, Australia, New Zealand, South America, Canada and the Western United States, also in some places such as Talysh people lands in Iran there are people who still live on mountains.

=== Physical adaptation and health ===
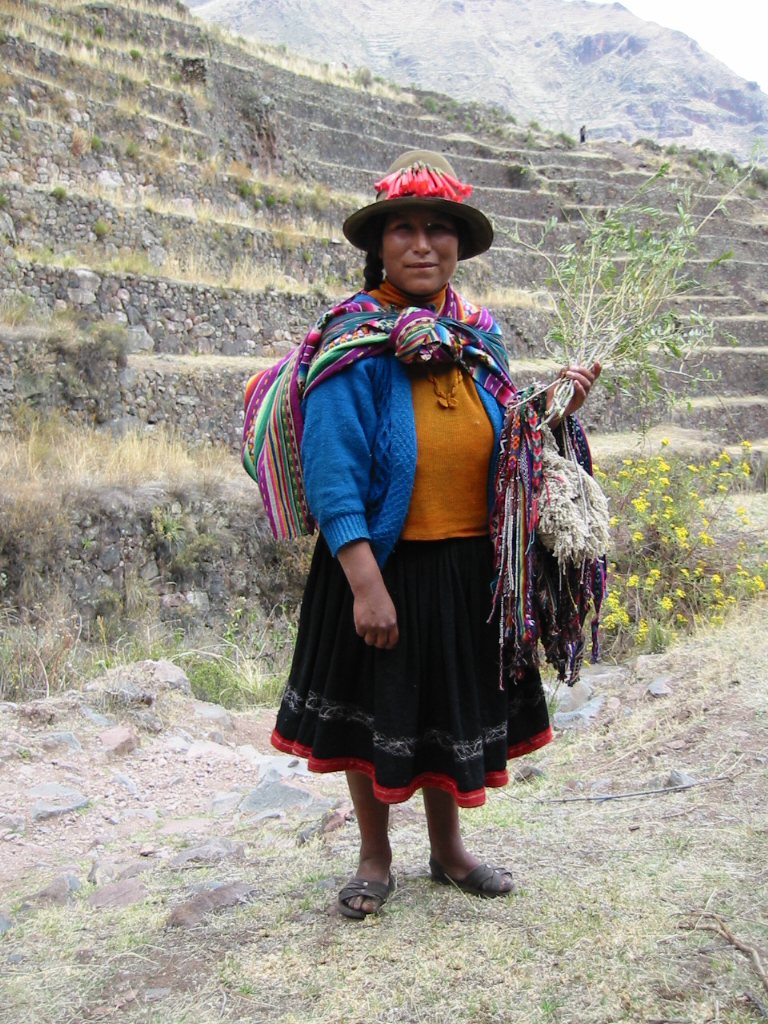
Quechua Woman in Peru

Many of the high-elevation people grow slowly and have small bodies. This may reduce their energy requirements without affecting their ability to handle hypoxia, cold and work demands. Long term high-elevation residents have expanded lungs and hearts, higher levels of hemoglobin in their blood and shorter limbs. There is no strong evidence that people who live at high elevations have become genetically adapted to the low levels of oxygen. They are not genetically isolated from the people of the lowlands, and typically move through a much wider range of elevations than other mountain species. However, studies have shown that some positive selected genes or gene regions do contribute to adaptation to high altitude in Andeans and Tibetans.

Studies in Peru of aerobic capacity, the body's ability to obtain oxygen, show that there is little difference between natives born at high elevations and lowlanders who move to high elevations when they were young children, although the lowlanders had more European ancestry than the high elevation natives. Aerobic capacity was lower with migrants who moved up in their adolescence, and lower again in those who moved as adults. Genetics are obviously important, but there is not yet evidence that inheritance is a strong factor in high-altitude adaptation in humans.

The people of the tropical high mountains experience more exposure to solar irradiance than lowlanders, and must adapt to wider temperature extremes between day and night. Seasonal weather imposes periods of low and high activity, and of scarce and plentiful food. Unpredictable droughts, periods of intense cold, plant and animal disease, and so on make food availability uncertain. An estimated 245 million mountain people are thought to be at risk of food shortages. 87% of these live below 2,500 metres (8,200 ft). Water boils at lower temperatures at higher altitudes, so it takes longer to cook food and requires more water and fuel. Gathering fuel in turn requires energy.

Compared to non-mountain populations, the mountain people suffer more from malnutrition due to food shortage and deficiencies in micronutrients (vitamins and minerals), and suffer from respiratory diseases caused by the severe climate and smoke in their shelters during the cold periods. These problems are compounded by poor access to primary health care.

== Rural economy ==
=== Land usage ===
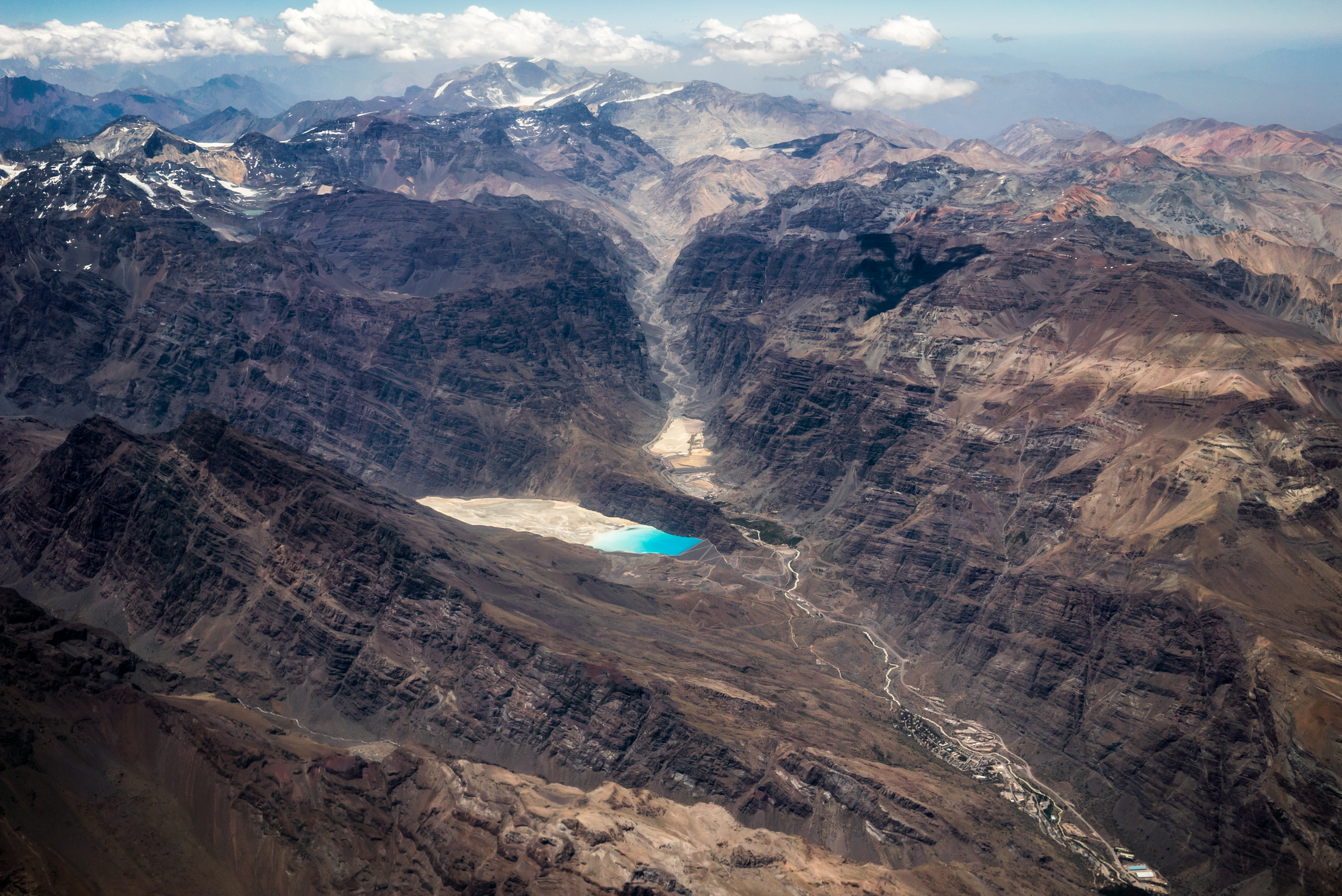
High altitude in the Chilean Andes

Based on a detailed GIS survey, in mountain regions of developing and transitional countries the types of land cover and actual land use are:

Land cover	Land use
Barren: 33%; Protected: 10%; Forest: 25%; Grazing: 25%; Cropland: 7%	Mainly barren: 26%; Protected: 9%; Grazing with some cropland, closed forest and barren land: 41%; Mainly grazing: 3%; Mainly closed forest: 9%; Mixed use: closed forest, grazing and cropland: 11%; Mainly cropland 1%

17% of the mountain population grows crops or combines crop, livestock and tree farming. 19% subsist from sparsely vegetated barren land, protected areas and closed forests. 44% of mountain land is used for grazing and is home to 64% of rural mountain people. At a global level, the average population density on grazing land below 3,500 metres (11,500 ft) meets or exceeds the critical density of 25 people per km^{2}. The growing mountain population in developing and transition countries is creating serious environmental problems in forest and grazing lands. Some of the forest or grazing land could be converted to crops for subsistence or cash, but 78% is unsuitable for this purpose, or only marginally suitable.

=== From hunting and gathering to farming and forestry ===
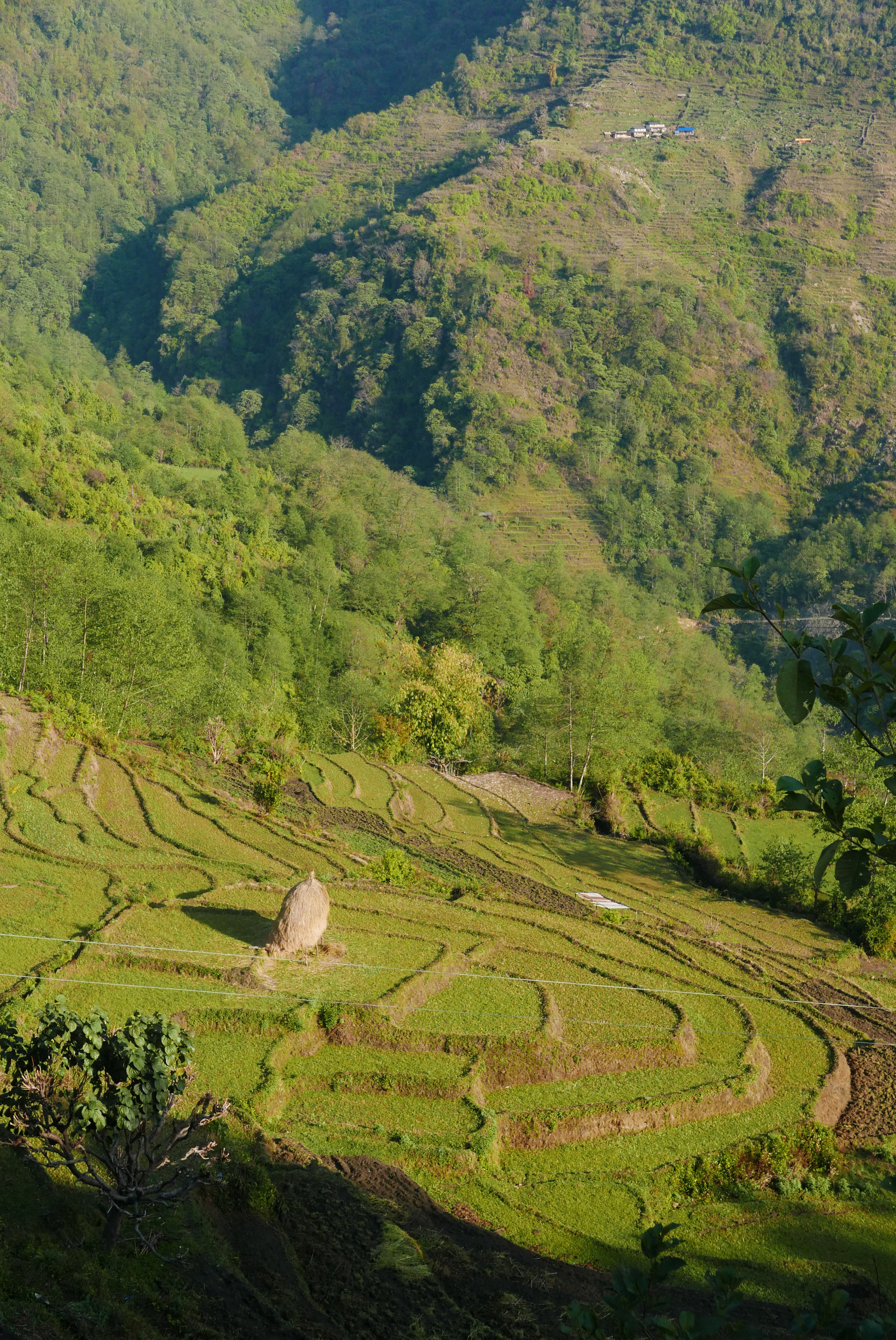
Terraced farming in Nepal

Paleolithic hunters and gatherers followed the mountain fauna as they moved from summer to winter pastures, fished, gathered edible plants and used the abundant timber for fire and shelter. The Dayaks of Kalimantan still follow a traditional hunting and gathering lifestyle, although they are under growing pressure from the outside world.

Later human settlers in the mountains practiced a combination of hunting and gathering, raising crops and tending livestock, with most families involved in all these activities. As specialist workers have emerged, the members of each household perform fewer activities, but there are more occupations within the community as a whole. This trend has accelerated in the last 400 years, driven by the industrial revolution and colonialism, the transition to commercial produce such as furs and minerals, and the recent growth of tourism. During this period large numbers of Han Chinese settlers migrated to the mountain areas in the southwest and west of China, while European settlers moved into South and North America. The indigenous people were often forced to work in commercial agricultural and mining enterprises. This transition was not entirely negative, but devastated many of the traditional mountain communities.

Maize, millet, potatoes, tomatoes and wheat have their origins in mountain regions, as do tea, coffee and quinoa. A comparison of crops grown in southern Switzerland, the Peruvian Andes and the Central Nepal Himalaya shows strong similarities. At low elevations (Note: Switzerland is further from the equator than Peru or Nepal, so the altitude zones change at lower altitudes.) crops in all three regions include fruits, and at mid elevations they all include cereals such as barley and wheat, and maize and rice in the Andes and Himalaya. Higher up the production gives way to tubers such as potatoes, then to forest, and then at high elevations to pasture for sheep, cattle, goats, and in Peru for camelids.

The people of the Andes maintain what John Victor Murra calls "vertical control", in which groups of people use kinship and other arrangements to access the resources of a range of ecological zones at different elevations, and thus to access a variety of crops and animals. This gives more security than dependence on a single resource. The volcanic mountain region of Java supports dense populations who take advantage of the rich soils and diverse altitude-based ecological zones. They accept a trade-off against the high potential for disastrous eruptions.

Near the equator the sun is almost overhead all year, so the orientation of slopes is unimportant. Further away, the amount of sunlight varies considerably. In the Alps the south-facing slopes are preferred for settlements and farming, while the north-facing slopes are used for forestry and ski resorts. In mountain regions with seasonal climates, including Europe, North America, the southern Andes and most of the Himalayas, high pastures can only be used in the summer and the people work in the lower forest zones during the winter. Nearer the equator in the central Andes, East Africa and Southeast Asia there may be less seasonal variation, and permanent settlements as high as 4,000 metres (13,000 ft) are practical, with economies based on herding and cold-resistant grains and tubers.

Where crops were previously grown only for local consumption, with improved transportation it is practical to grow cash crops such as carrots, cabbage, beans, garlic and apples for sale in distant markets. In Africa there is strong pressure on the mid-elevation environment from commercial and subsistence farming. Rapid population growth in East Africa is mainly concentrated in the fertile farmlands of the mountain regions. Although the public has come to value the presence in the mountains of large predators such as bears, wolves and snow leopards, the local people tend not share that view, since the wildlife preys upon their livestock and crops.

=== Mining ===
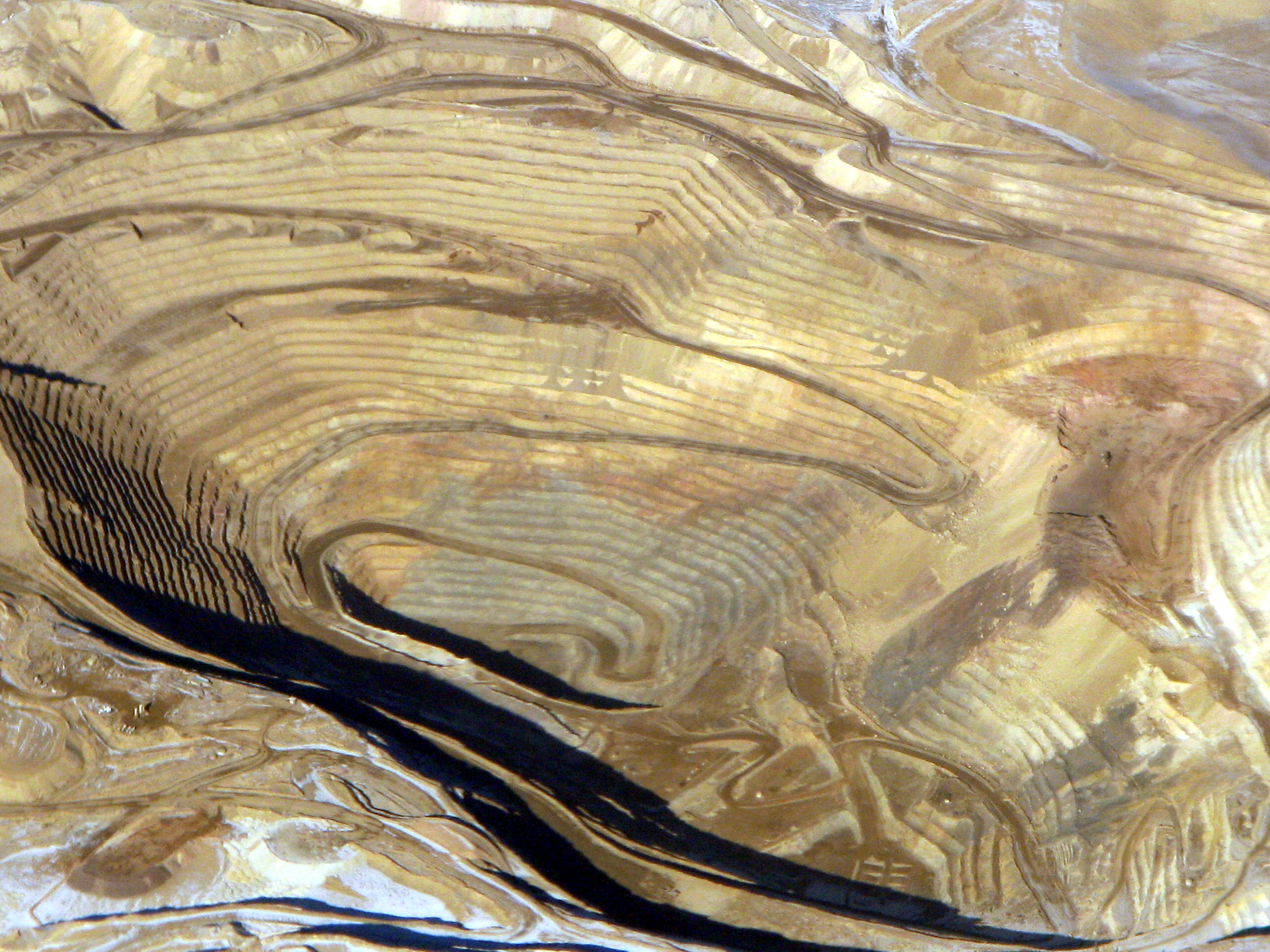
Round Mountain gold mine, Nevada, USA

Mining has been an important part of mountain economies throughout history, with prospectors seeking precious stones, ores, coal and salt in the mountains of Europe and the Americas. In many places rock, gravel and sand quarries are also economically important. In North America, coal mining in the Appalachians and mining for metal ores in the western mountains resulted in growth of settlements between 1850 and 1930. Many of these were abandoned during the Great Depression, but mining is still an important part of the mountain economy of the Americas. Although mining in the mountains has a very long history, the local communities often resent the exploitation of common lands by mining companies and the associated environmental damage.

So far, there has been relatively little mining in the Hindu Kush, Karakoram and Himalayas, although this seems likely to change.

== Migration ==
Many of the mountain people in developing countries are poor and depend on scarce or diminishing food resources from agriculture or livestock. They may be partially employed in forestry, mining and service jobs. In the past Gurkhas, Swiss and Scottish highlanders served as mercenaries in foreign countries. Today many people from the South Asian mountains work in other countries such as the Gulf States and send part of their earnings home. Men in the Andes often find seasonal work in the lowland farms and oilfields, or work in developed countries such as Spain. This creates a fragile economy where the old people, women and children who remain behind depend on remittances from the men. The situation in Europe and North America used to be similar, but with improved transportation today the mountain people are quite prosperous.

The mountains are visited seasonally by nomadic pastoralists such as the Gaddis and Gurjars in the western Himalayas. A similar seasonal pattern was followed by North American hunters and gatherers in the past. Other semi-permanent residents in the developed countries include young people who find jobs in the ski resorts or as tree planters and people with second homes in the mountains they use for recreation. In South and East Asia, much of the labor for construction, road building and road maintenance is supplied by poor laborers from the lowlands. The Sherpas in the region near Mount Everest can often afford to employ Rai workers for most manual tasks.

== Urban areas ==
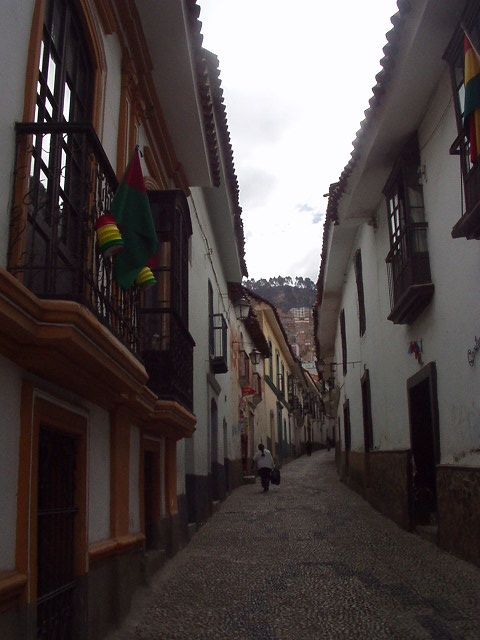
La Paz, Bolivia

Almost 30% of mountain people live in towns or cities. The largest cities are on the margins of the mountains, or are on high plateaus, sometimes very high.

Examples of large (over 1 million people) cities in or beside the mountains in Latin America include (in descending order), La Paz at 3,500 to 3,800 metres (11,500 to 12,500 ft), Quito at 2,850 metres (9,350 ft), Bogotá at 2,650 metres (8,690 ft), Mexico City at 2,250 metres (7,380 ft), Guatemala City at 1,530 metres (5,020 ft), Caracas at 900 metres (3,000 ft) and Santiago at 520 metres (1,710 ft).

In North America they include Denver, Vancouver and Calgary. Geneva and Zürich are among European mountain cities, and Addis Ababa and Nairobi among African mountain cities.

The list in Asia includes Tehran, Bandung, Chandigarh, Dehradun, Siliguri, Kathmandu, Chengdu and Kunming.

The large cities are more or less influenced by the mountains, including the low-lying Vancouver and Chandigarh, but to a lesser degree than the smaller cities and towns within the mountains. The smaller cities, typically in mountain valleys, are more closely linked to the mountain culture, although they have often diversified into tourism and recreation services, mineral processing, manufacturing, administration and services. The mountain cities, particularly in developing countries, are magnets to migrants from the rural areas of the mountains seeking work, security and other benefits. Many are ringed by densely populated squatter communities.

== Statistics ==
=== Classes of mountain region ===
Mountain regions are classified by the World Conservation Monitoring Centre (WCMC) based on absolute elevation, slope and Local Elevation Range (LER), which is the range of elevations within a 5 kilometres (3.1 mi) radius, and indicates how hilly the land is.

Class	Elevation range		Slope or LER
Class	Meters	Feet	Slope or LER
Class 1	300–1,000	980–3,280	LER > 300 metres (980 ft)
Class 2	1,000–1,500	3,300–4,900	Slope > 5° or LER > 300 metres (980 ft)
Class 3	1,500–2,500	4,900–8,200	Slope > 2°
Class 4	2,500–3,500	8,200–11,500	
Class 5	3,500–4,500	11,500–14,800	
Class 6	> 4,500	> 14,800	

=== Populations by geographical region and elevation ===
The 2003 FAO report gives the following mountain area populations by geographical region and elevation:

Region	Mountain Population	Percentage of mountain population by elevation			
Region	Mountain Population	<1,000m	1,100-2,500m	2,500-3,500m	>3,500m
Asia & Pacific	333,000,000	60%	35%	3%	2%
Latin America & Caribbean	113,000,000	38%	38%	17%	7%
Near East & North Africa	97,000,000	38%	57%	5%	-
Sub-Saharan Africa	88,000,000	19%	66%	14%	1%
Countries in Transition	32,000,000	78%	22%	-	-
Developed Countries	56,000,000	79%	21%	-	-

=== Population densities by geographical region and class ===
The 2003 FAO report gives the following mountain area population densities by geographical region and class of mountain region:

Region	People per km^{2}						
Region	Class 1	Class 2	Class 3	Class 4	Class 5	Class 6	Average pop. density
Asia and Pacific	74	52	44	13	5	2	40
Latin America and Caribbean	30	25	30	42	14	8	27
Near East and North Africa	43	42	29	23	7	2	36
Sub-Saharan Africa	20	34	80	124	53	10	41
Countries in transition	7	4	4	2	2	-	6
Developed countries	13	6	2	-	-	-	8

=== Area and population by geographical region ===
The 2003 FAO report gives the following area and population estimates:

Sub-region	Mountain area km^{2}	Mountain area % of total area	Mountain population	Mountain population % of total pop.
Developing countries
East Asia	5,514,000	50	228,016,000	17
Southeast Asia and Oceania	1,729,000	35	52,101,000	10
South Asia	1,051,000	24	52,953,000	4
Caribbean	46,000	22	2,779,000	9
North America	881,000	45	29,658,000	30
Central America	213,000	41	18,732,000	53
South America	2,996,000	17	61,253,000	18
Near East	2,202,000	34	81,714,000	33
North Africa	478,000	9	15,525,000	11
Central Africa	308,000	6	8,944,000	11
East Africa	1,016,000	16	61,955,000	29
Southern Africa	681,000	13	13,035,000	16
West Africa	120,000	2	4,046,000	2
Total developing	17,237,000	23	630,710,000	14
Countries in transition
Commonwealth of Independent States	4,966,000	23	17,278,000	6
Baltic states	0	0	0	0
Eastern Europe	340,000	29	14,804,000	12
Total developing & transition countries	22,542,000	23	662,792,000	13
Total developed countries	6,842,000	20	55,998,000	6
Total world	29,384,000	22	718,790,000	12

== Hill people groups ==
- Afghans
- Appalachian Americans
- Aymara people
- Basques
- Caucasians
- Ethiopian Highlanders
- Gorani people
- Gorals
- Highland Scots
  - Indigenous Highland Travellers
- Jumma people
- Khmer Loeu
- Kurds
- Lao Sung
- Lao Theung
- Malësians
- Merina people
- Miao people
- Montagnard
- Montañés, Asturians, Galicians, Mirandese
- Nepalis
- Northeast Indian Hill tribes
- Ozark Americans
- Pahari culture
- Pamiris
- Papuan Highlanders
- Pogorzans
- Quechua people
- Sącz Lachs
- Swiss people
- Tibetans
- Rusyns
  - Lemkos
- Thai Hill tribes (List)
- Uru people
- Vlachs

== See also ==
- Andean civilizations
- Southeast Asian Massif
- Talysh Mountains
- Zomia

== Sources ==
- Beniston, Martin; Fox, Douglas G. (1995), "Impacts of Climate Change on Mountain Regions" (PDF), Climate Change 1995: The IPCC Second Assessment Report, Cambridge University Press for Intergovernmental Panel on Climate Change
- Blyth, Simon; Groombridge, Brian; Lysenko, Igor; Miles, Lera; Newton, Adrian (2002), Mountain Watch: Environmental Change and Sustainable Development in Mountains (PDF), Cambridge, United Kingdom: UNEP World Conservation Monitoring Centre
- Bigham, A; Bauchet, M; Pinto, D; Mao, X; Akey, JM; Mei, R; Scherer SW, Julian CG, Wilson MJ, López Herráez D, Brutsaert T, Parra EJ, Moore LG, Shriver MD (2010), "Identifying signatures of natural selection in Tibetan and Andean populations using dense genome scan data", PLOS Genetics, 6 (9) e1001116, doi:10.1371/journal.pgen.1001116, PMC 2936536, PMID 20838600
- Grover, Velma I.; Borsdorf, Axel; Breuste, Jürgen; Tiwari, Prakash Chandra; Frangetto, Flavia Witkowski (19 December 2014), Impact of Global Changes on Mountains: Responses and Adaptation, CRC Press, ISBN 978-1-4822-0891-7
- Huddleston, Barbara; Ataman, Ergin; Fè d'Ostiani, Luca (2003), Towards a GIS-based analysis of mountain environments and populations (PDF), Rome: Food and Agriculture Organization of the United Nations
- Palmer, Bill (4 December 2017), The Languages and Linguistics of the New Guinea Area: A Comprehensive Guide, Walter de Gruyter GmbH & Co KG, ISBN 978-3-11-029525-2
- Price, Martin F.; Byers, Alton C.; Friend, Donald A.; Kohler, Thomas; Price, Larry W. (24 August 2013), Mountain Geography: Physical and Human Dimensions, Univ of California Press, ISBN 978-0-520-95697-1
- Webber, Patrick J (8 March 2019), High Altitude Geoecology, Taylor & Francis, ISBN 978-0-429-72735-1
