= Highland People Discovery Museum =

Ethnographic museum in northern Thailand

Coordinates: 18°49′17.06″N 98°58′29.10″E

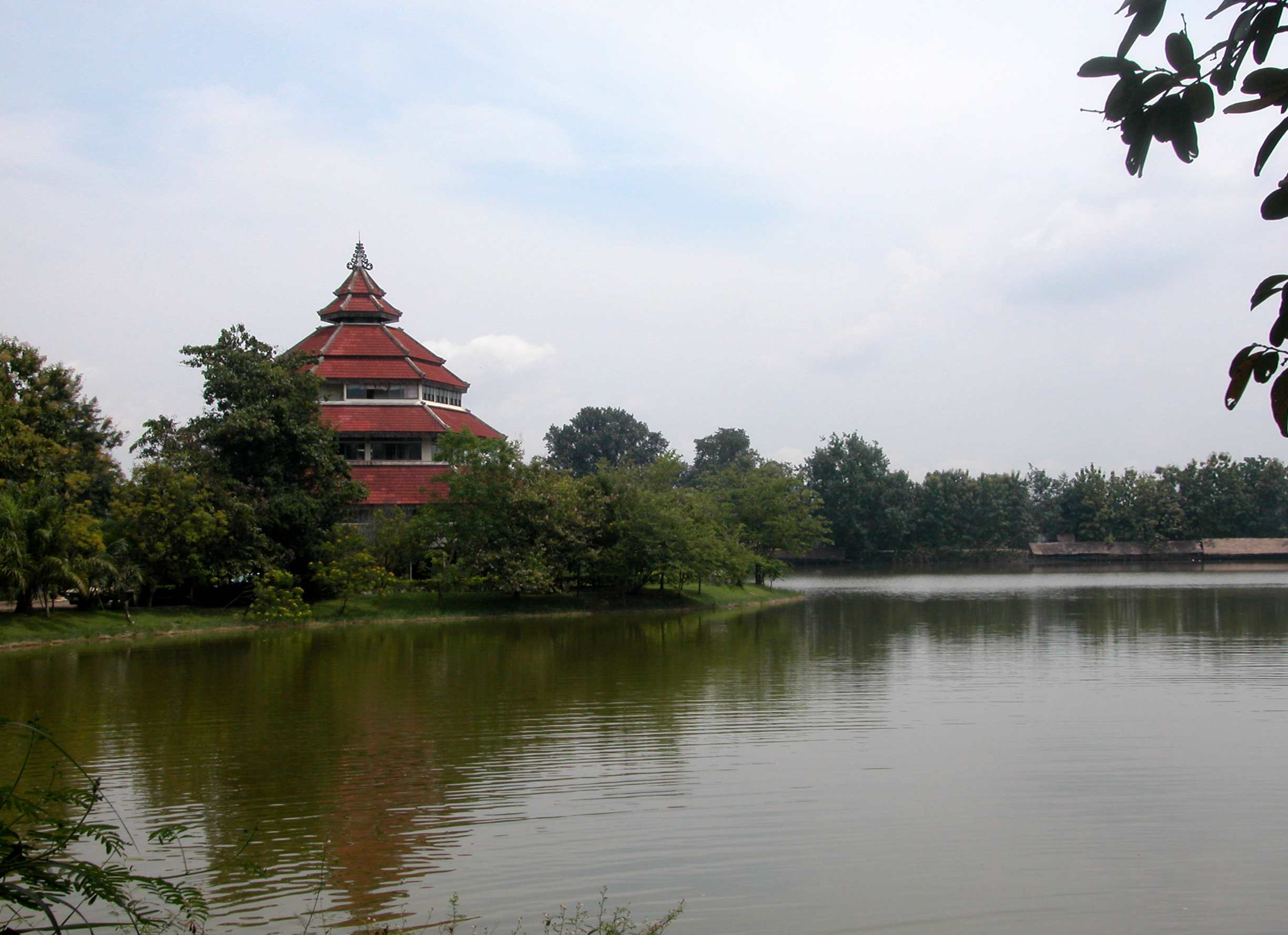
The museum building

The Highland People Discovery Museum (Thai: พิพิธภัณฑ์เรียนรู้ราษฎรบนพื้นที่สูง), formerly known as the Tribal Museum, is an ethnographic museum in the Mueang Chiang Mai District of Chiang Mai province, northern Thailand, showing the life of Thailand's minority hill tribes.

== Exhibits ==
The museum highlights the history and culture of the mountain tribes of north Thailand, including the Akha, Karen, Khamu, Lahu, Lua, Lisu, Hmong, Mien, and Thin peoples. The museum has three components:

- Indoor exhibits of tribal clothes, jewellery and other artefacts
- A video presentation of tribal life in northern Thailand
- A large garden with exhibits of tribal huts, reconstructed in an attractive waterside setting.

In addition, the Tribal Museum hosts a monthly tribal market, selling handmade clothes, craft goods and food, from a different hill tribe each month.

Tribal huts as can be seen in the garden

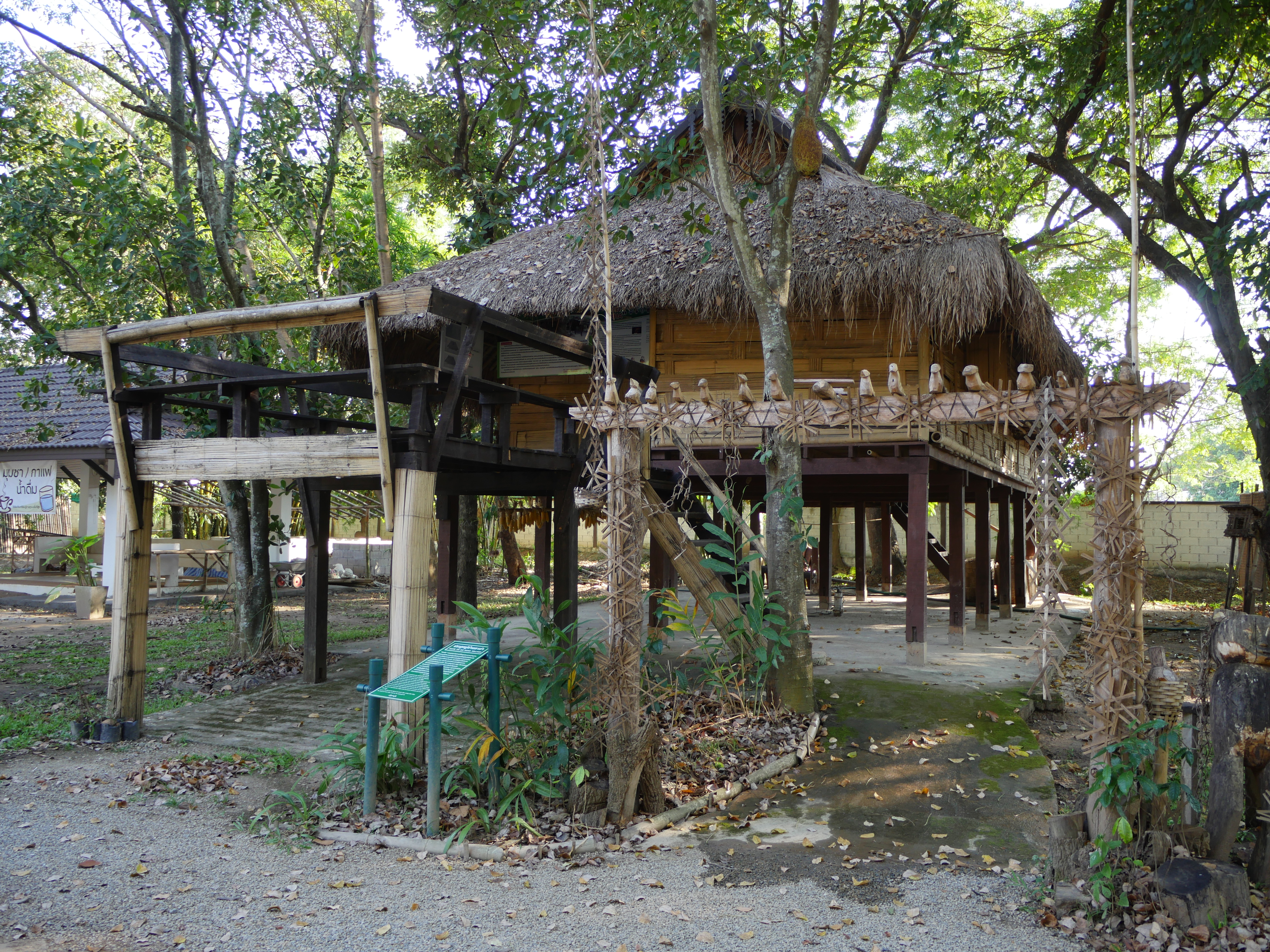
Akha

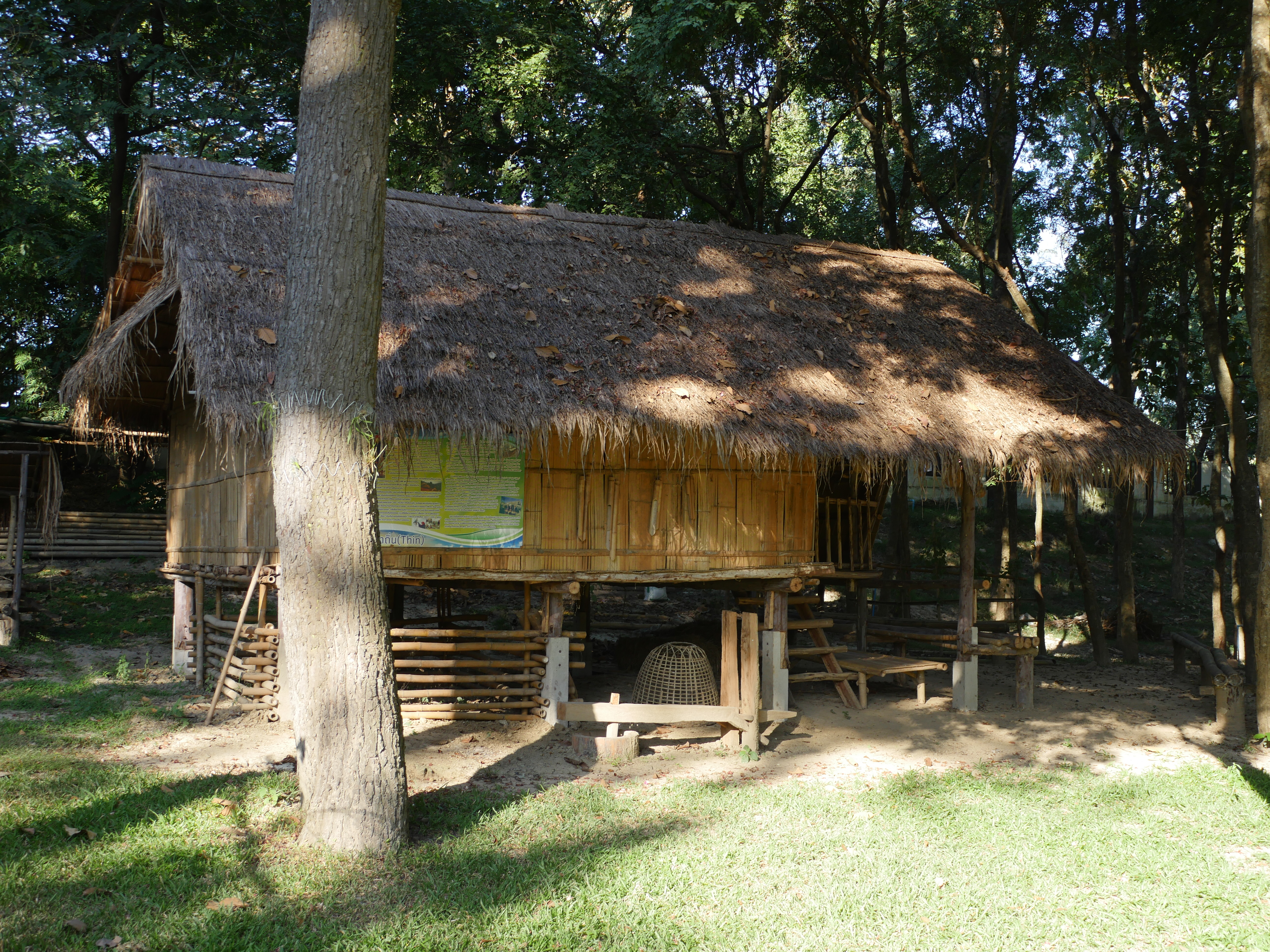
H'tin

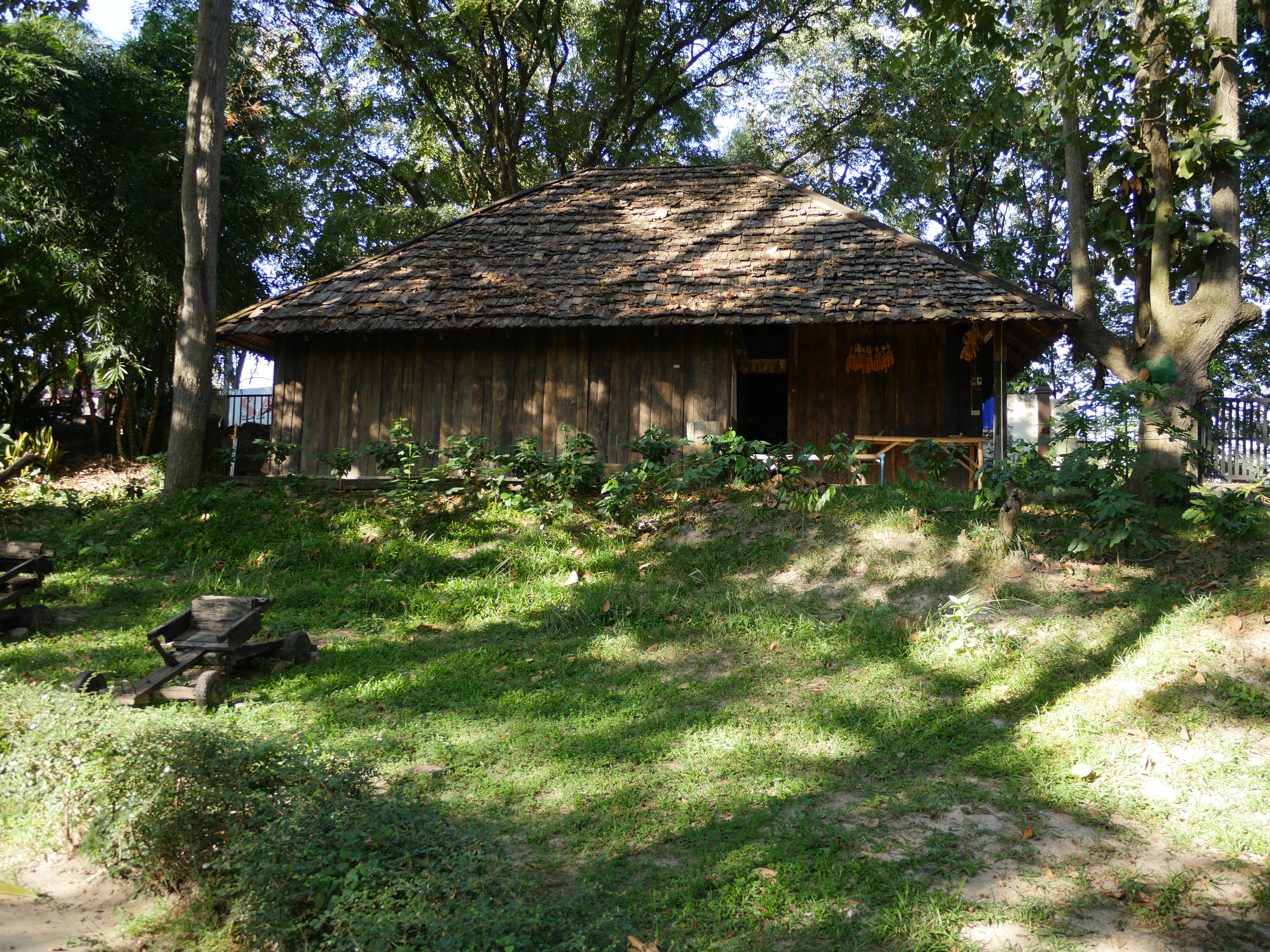
Hmong

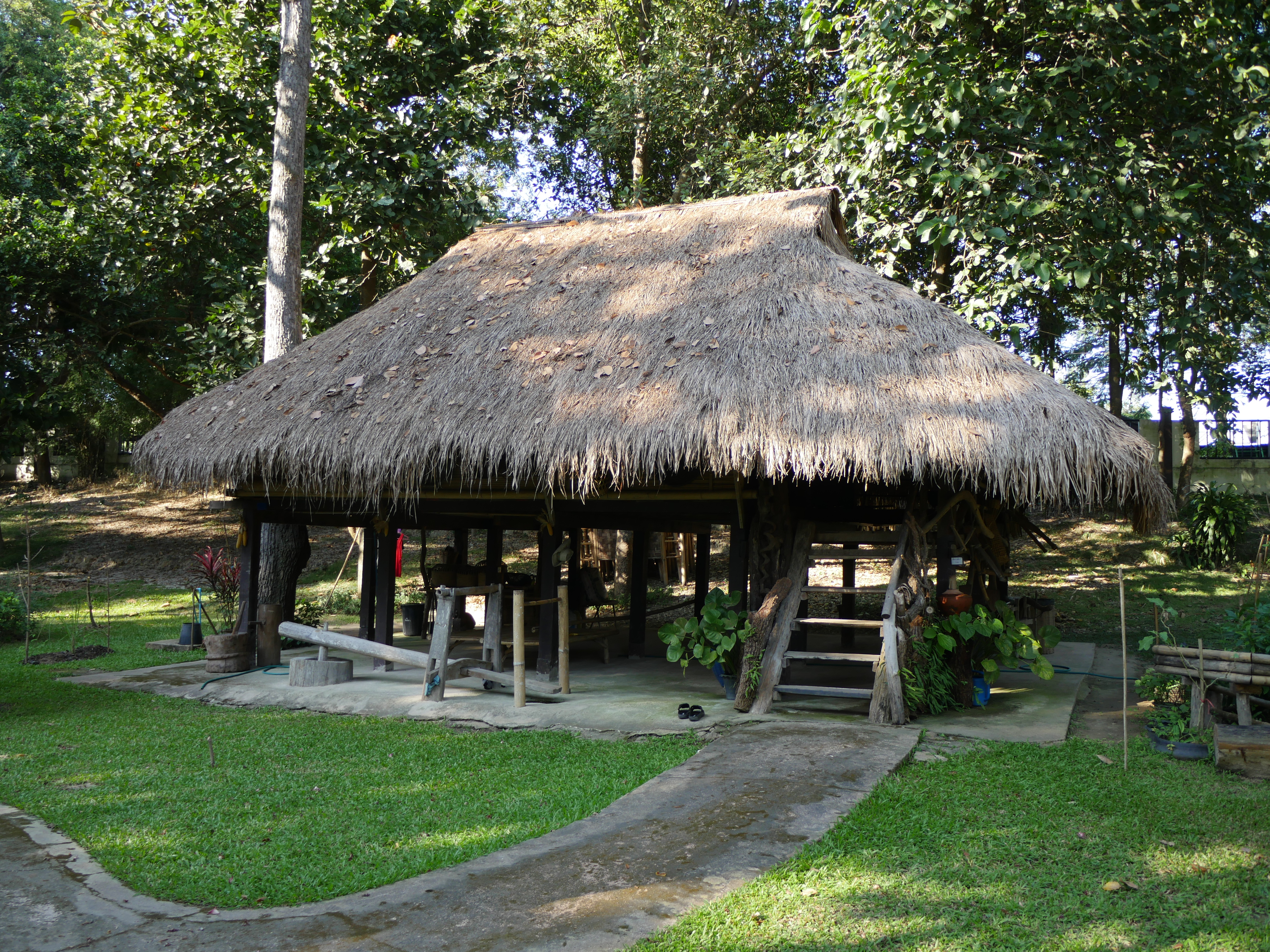
Karen

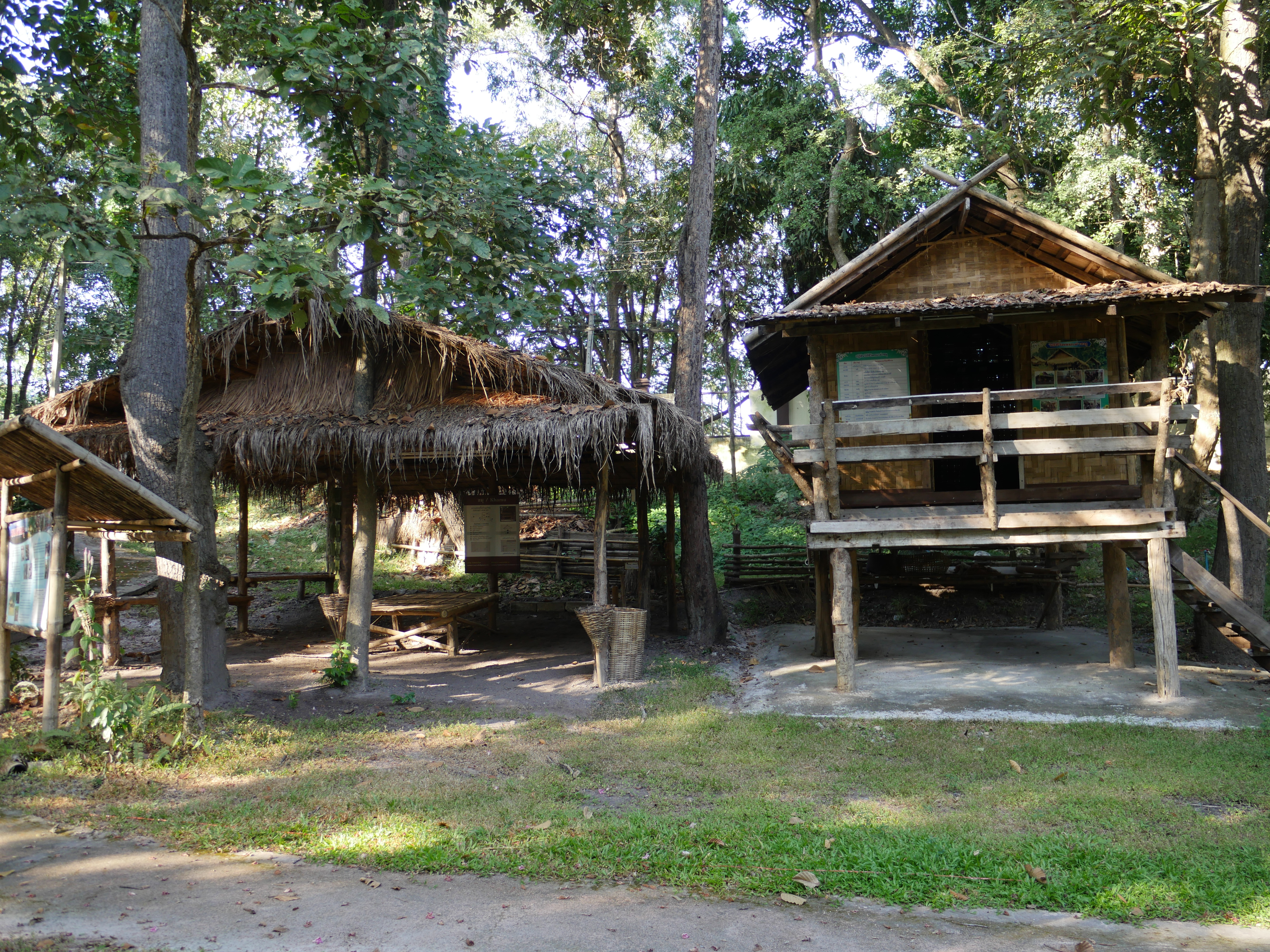
Khamu

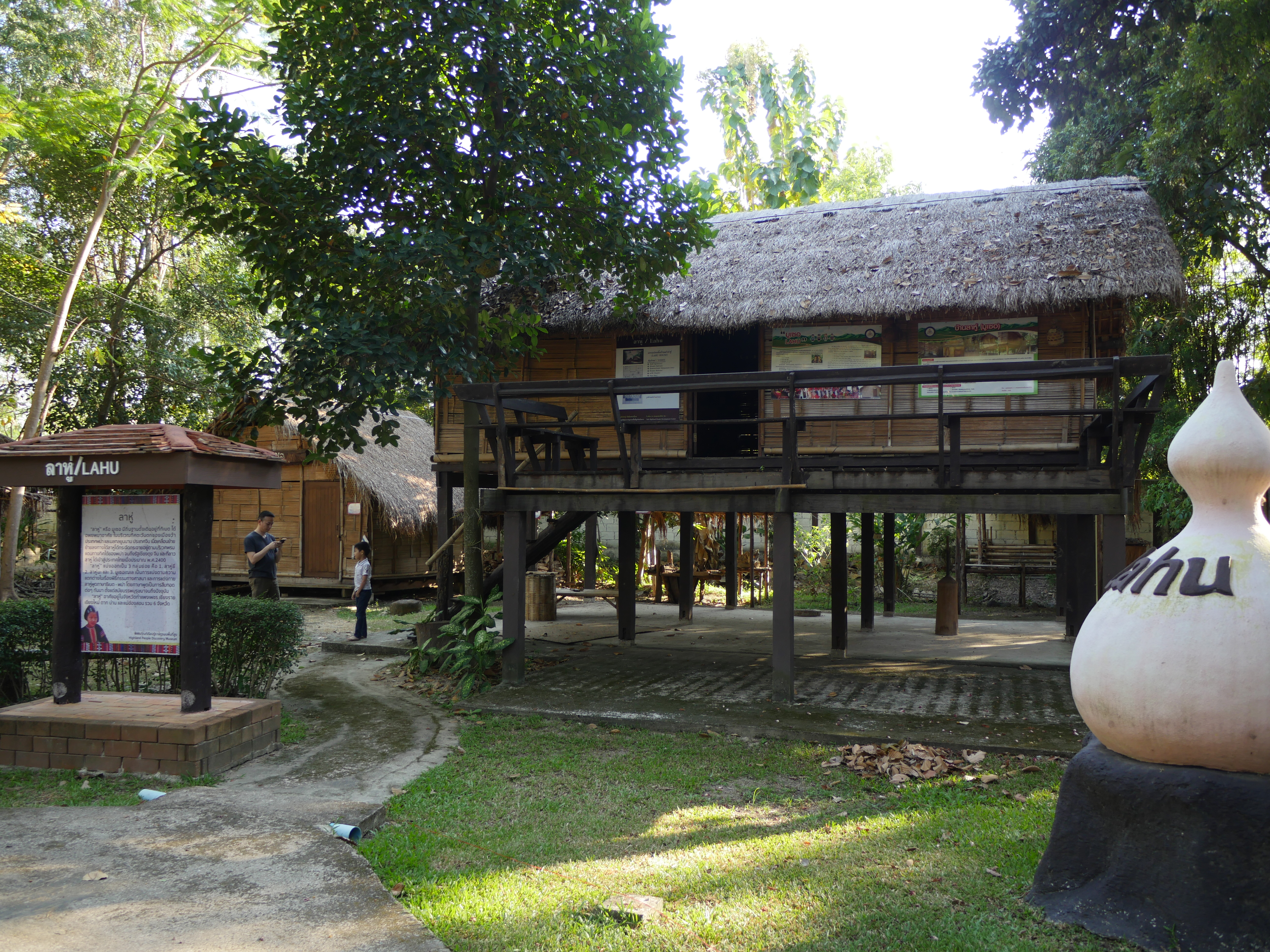
Lahu

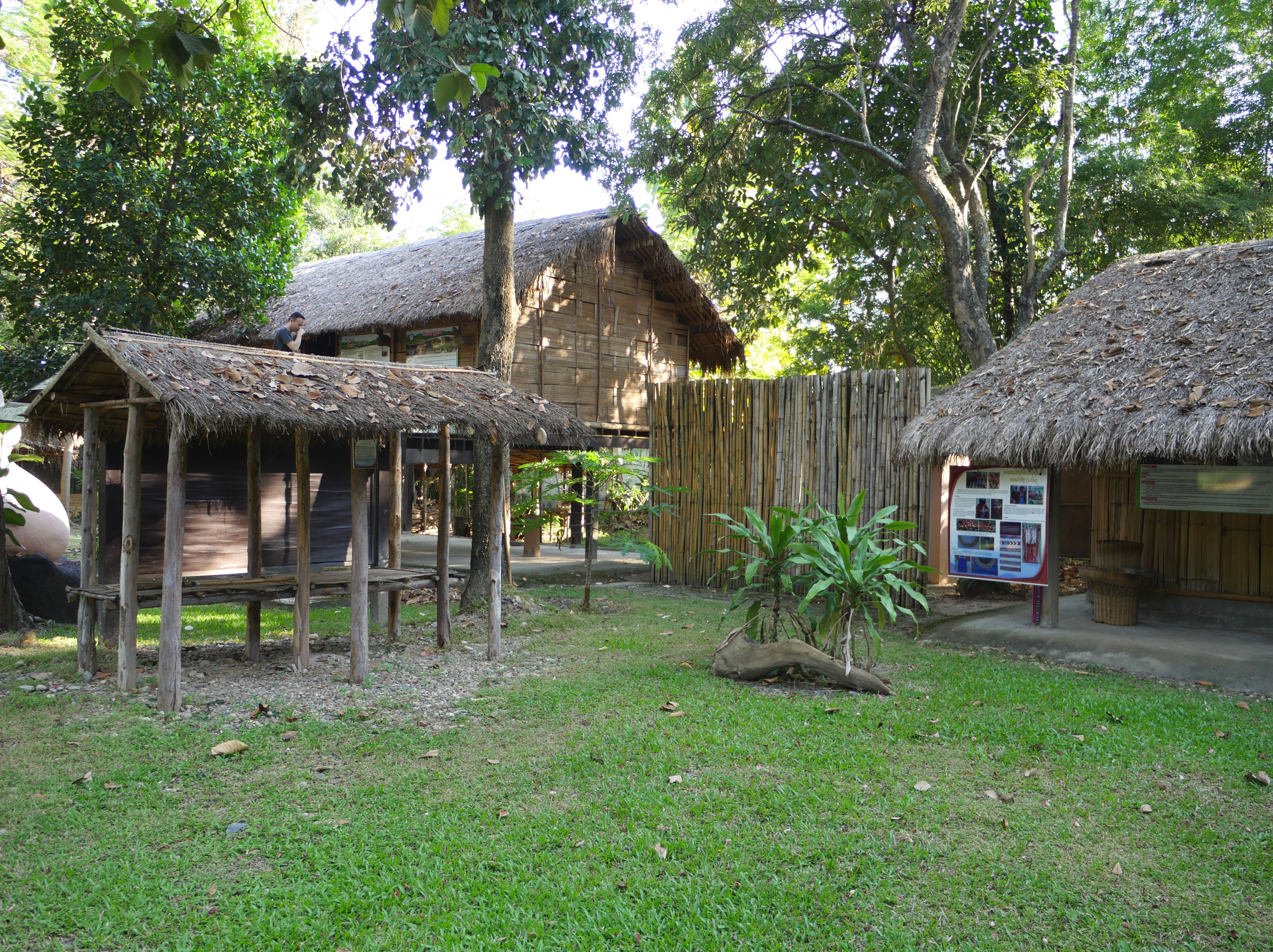
Lisu

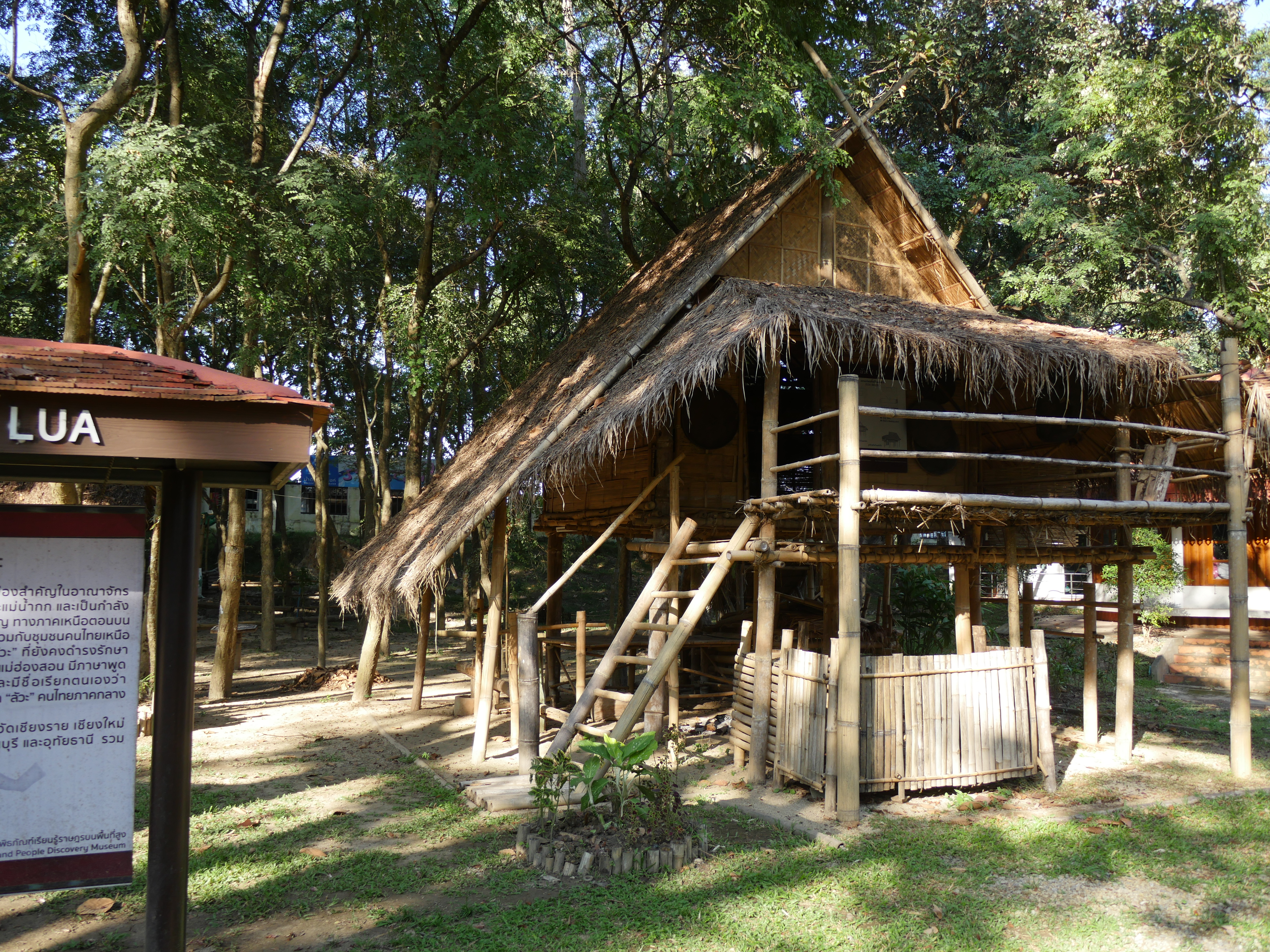
Lua

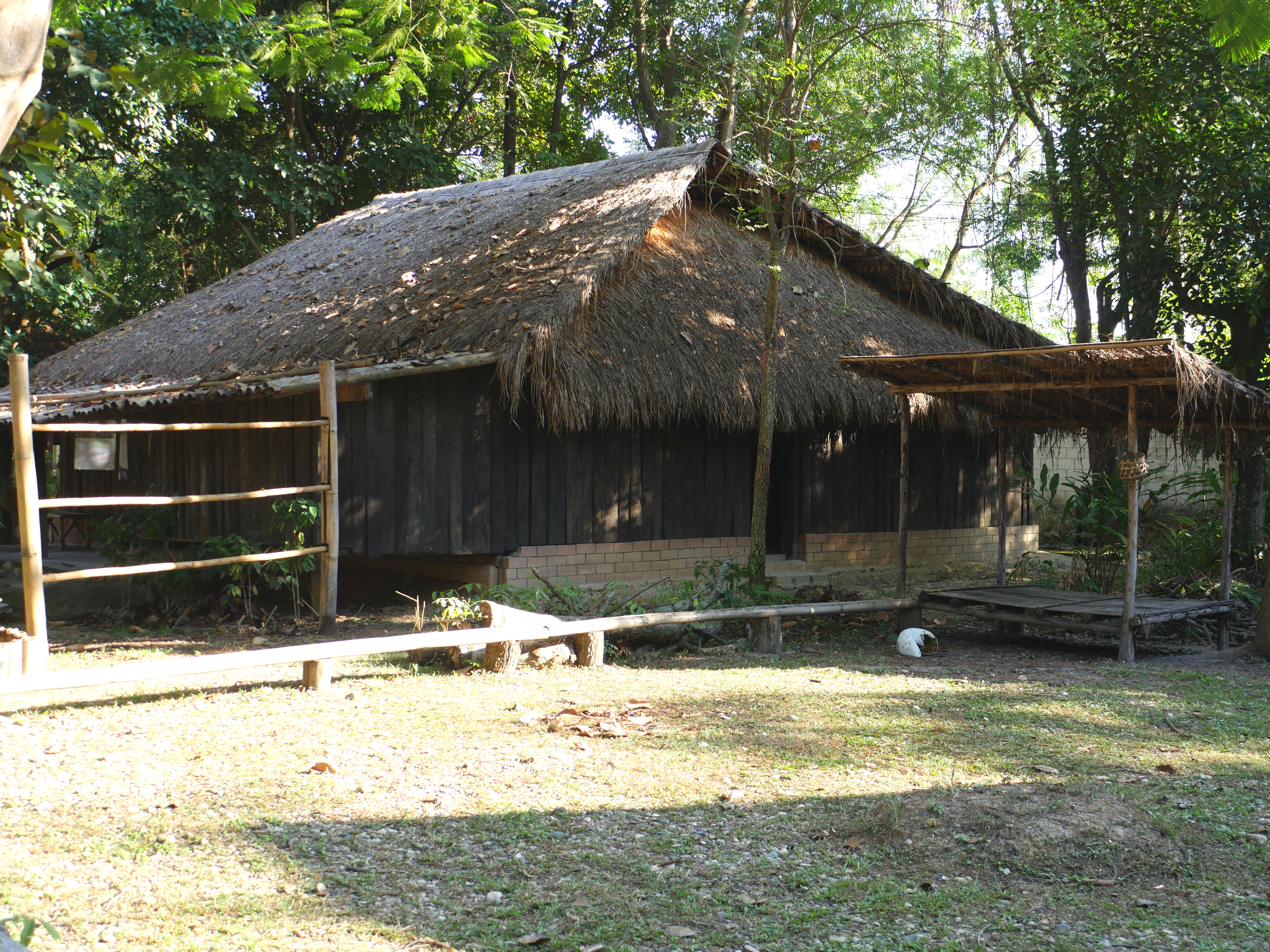
Mien

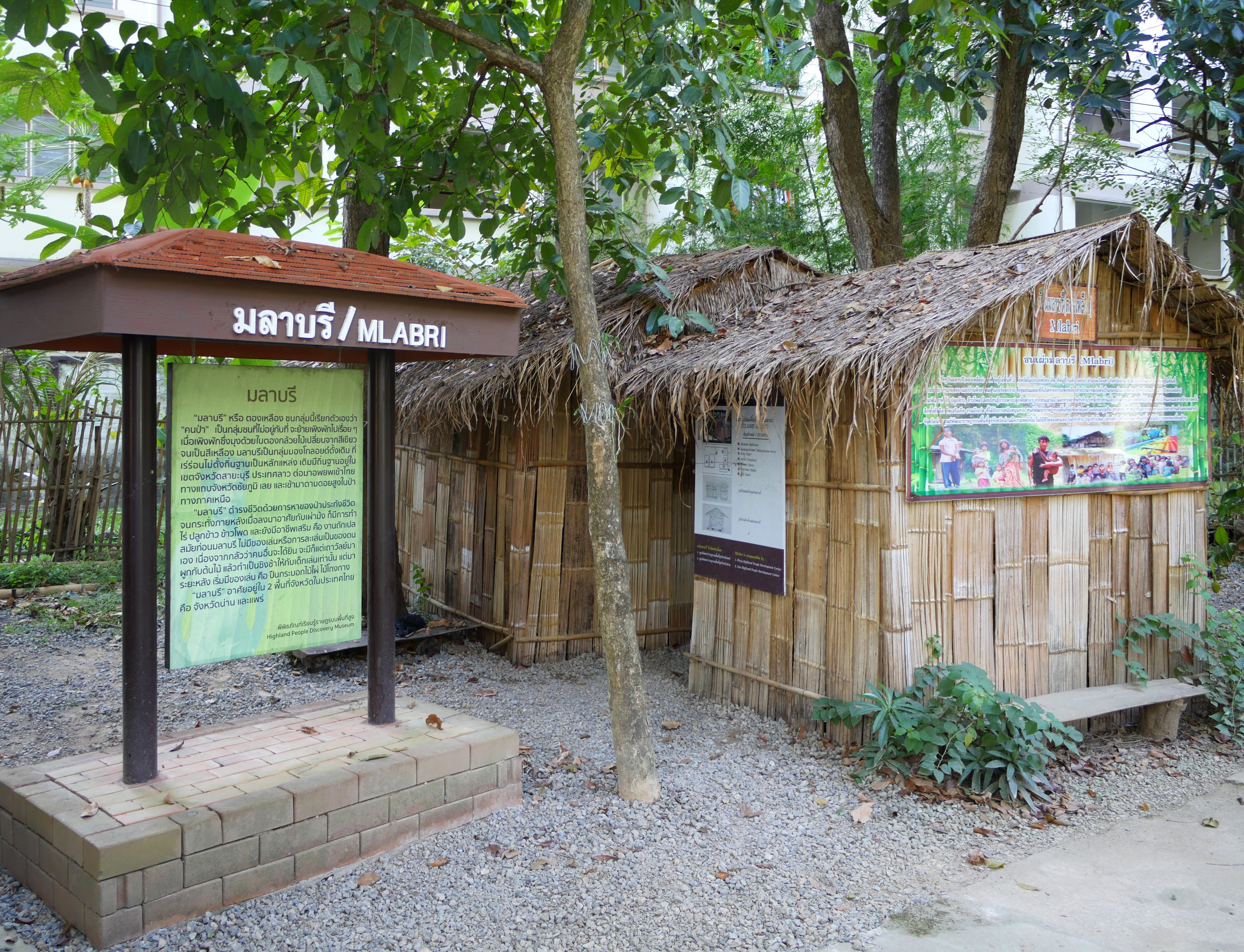
Mlabri

== Reviews ==
The Rough Guide notes that the Tribal Museum "enjoys a superb location behind the artfully landscaped Ratchamangkla Park. Overlooking a tree-lined lake, the very pretty and peaceful setting makes a visit worthwhile, as does the opportunity to learn something about the various hill tribes before heading off on a trek." The "useful wall chart" explains life in a village around the year, "giving a month-by-month picture of the agricultural activities, ceremonies and festivals of the tribes featured", while the photographs and models of village houses give "a good idea of the different styles of architecture, and a display of hill tribe instruments accompanied by taped music".

The New York Times quotes Frommer on the Tribal Museum: "Formerly part of Chiang Mai University's Tribal Research Institute, this small exhibit showcases the cultures and daily lives of the hill tribe people of Thailand's north. It is recommended as a good introductory course for those who plan to visit many northern villages."

Thailand's World recommends the Tribal Museum, writing "A visit to the Tribal Museum is strongly recommended as an introduction to the cultures and practices of the current hill tribes of northern Thailand. This museum serves as an extensive resource centre for the tribal cultures, and the visitor will certainly leave with a better understanding of each hill tribe. It is unique and compact, and together with the nearby National Museum of Chiang Mai, can be viewed in half a day."
