= Red Dog Blue Kat =

Canadian raw pet food manufacturer

- Type: Private
- Industry: Pet food
- Founded: 2004
- Headquarters: Port Coquitlam, British Columbia, Canada
- Products: Frozen raw pet food; dried raw pet food
- Website: www.reddogbluekat.com

Red Dog Blue Kat (RDBK) is a Canadian pet food manufacturer based in Port Coquitlam, British Columbia. Founded in 2004, the company produces raw dog and cat food. Media coverage has also referred to the corporate entity as Red Dog Deli Raw Food Company Inc.

== History ==
Red Dog Blue Kat began producing raw dog and cat food in Metro Vancouver in 2004. A 2016 report in the Vancouver Sun noted rising demand for raw dog food in Canada and quoted company owner Inna Shekhtman in coverage of the expanding raw market. The report also noted that veterinarians are skeptical of the value of raw diets, stating that "There is no scientific evidence of health benefit to the pet". In 2017, Business in Vancouver reported the company's move to a larger production facility in Port Coquitlam and nationwide distribution through pet stores. It has a partnership with Forage Capital Partners.

In 2026, market intelligence firm The Business Research Company identified Red Dog Blue Kat as a top ten global player in the raw pet food market, holding a 0.2% global market share.

== Products ==
RDBK produces frozen raw dog and cat food. In April 2025, trade publications reported the launch of a shelf-stable raw product line marketed as Everyday Raw Anywhere.

== See also ==
- Raw feeding
- Cat food
- Dog food
