= Linda November =

American singer (born 1944)

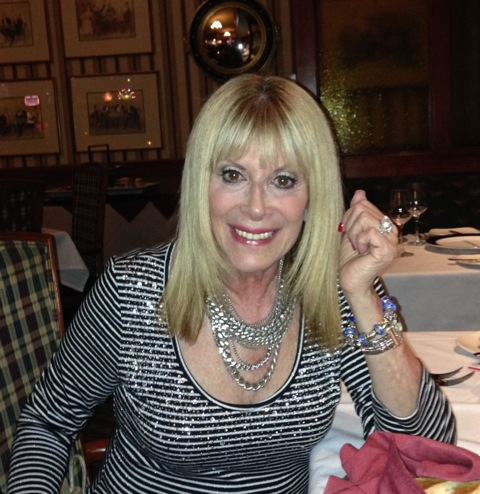
- Linda November 2014
- Born: Linda Ellen November; October 16, 1944 (age 82); East New York, Brooklyn
- Occupations: Pianist and singer
- Known for: Advertising jingles, such as the Meow Mix Theme
- Spouse: Artie Schroeck

Linda Ellen November (born October 16, 1944) is an American singer who has sung tens of thousands of commercial jingles. She was the voice of the singing cat in the Meow Mix commercials, sang the jingle "Galaxy Glue" in the 1981 film The Incredible Shrinking Woman, the "Coke and a Smile" jingle in the classic Mean Joe Greene Super Bowl commercial, and has won many Clio Awards for her work on television and radio.

Her voice can also be heard on many pop songs, as she was a regular backup singer for artists such as Frankie Valli, Burt Bacharach, Engelbert Humperdinck, and Neil Diamond. In the 1970s, she was one of the main singers in the disco group Wing and a Prayer Fife and Drum Corps, which charted with the Top 40 hit "Baby Face" in 1976. Throughout the 1980s and 1990s, she was a regular performer in Atlantic City at The Grand and Harrah's, with her husband, composer and arranger Artie Schroeck. As of 2011, she works as a piano accompanist in Las Vegas, Nevada.

== Biography ==
=== Early years (1940s–1960s) ===
November was born in Brooklyn, the older of two children to Eleanore and Julius November. Her father was an attorney to clients such as boxer Floyd Patterson, and her younger brother Philip became an attorney as well. She started her career in music as a concert pianist, playing piano from the age of five. However, she lost interest in the piano as a teenager and turned to singing instead, helped by the fact that she learned she had perfect pitch. She attended Thomas Jefferson High School, then The High School of Music & Art, and then from the age of 15 began studying voice with Beverly Johnson at Juilliard. She developed a strong soprano voice, described by The Dallas Morning News as "high, strong, and unwontedly pure".

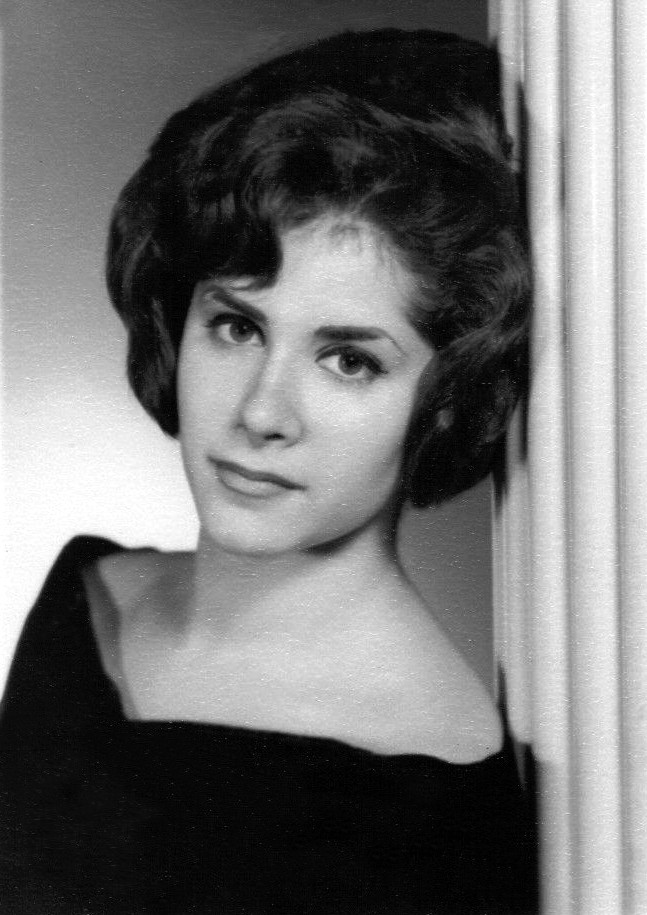
Linda November 1963

At the age of 16, she got a lucky break because of a visit to a podiatrist. The doctor had an office at Broadway and 42nd Street, in what had been a fashionable Knickerbocker Hotel suite in the early 1900s, the New York residence of opera singer Enrico Caruso (1873–1921). So the doctor would often entertain visitors who were there to see the Caruso memorabilia. While she herself was at the office, November met another patient who had contacts in the music industry, and she sang an impromptu audition. The patient was impressed, and put her in touch with one of his contacts, manager Gus Schirmer (of the Schirmer Music publishing family), who was looking for "pretty sopranos" for his summer musicals. Schirmer introduced her to Broadway composer Richard Rodgers, who became her mentor, and through Schirmer, November also auditioned for other producers such as Lawrence Kasha. She obtained work as a performer in the 1963 summer musical season in Dallas, Texas, but despite many auditions, could never land a job in Broadway theatre (according to November, this was because she never had the exact look that a particular show was looking for). Then Schirmer got her a job singing at an industrial musical for Ford Motor Company, where she met many other successful musicians, singers, and composers such as Ray Charles. He began incorporating her into sessions with the Ray Charles Singers, a group of performers with a rotating membership that would sing in close harmonies, often on productions with singer and television personality Perry Como, or as backup singers for other recordings. This launched November's career as a studio singer, as she worked on a contract basis for many different productions. From 1962 to 1967 November would rotate in and out as part of the Ray Charles Singers, sometimes seen on Perry Como's Kraft Music Hall variety program. She can also be heard as a backup singer on some Frank Sinatra recordings, such as the soprano voice in the background of the 1967 song, "The World We Knew".

=== Jingle singer (1960s–1990s) ===
Over the course of her 32 years as a jingle singer, November sang approximately 22,000 jingles which were played on the television and radio. In the 1970s, it was estimated that 75% of the jingles that could be heard on the airways were sung by no more than 30 people, and November was known as the "Jingle Queen". In several unusual jingles, she had to sing with different voices. She once sang as a person underwater, and for Chicken of the Sea, a brand of tuna, she sang like a chicken underwater. Her most notable commercial was in an ad campaign for Meow Mix, where she was the voice ("Meow meow meow meow...") of a singing cat. The idea came from Ron Travisano at the advertising agency of Della Femina Travisano and Partners, who had the account with Ralston Purina in 1976. Travisano put together film footage with editor Jay Gold, looping images of a cat to make it look like it was singing. Working from the film, Tom McFaul of the jingle house Lucas/McFaul composed music to fit, and Linda November sang the meowing melody. The campaign was a major success, spawned 81 other different commercials, and hundreds of thousands of dollars in residuals. Linda November was also one of the singers for Coca-Cola's "Have a Coke and a Smile" campaign, heard most famously on the 1979 Mean Joe Greene commercial, considered one of the top Super Bowl commercials of all time.

=== Other projects (1970s–present) ===
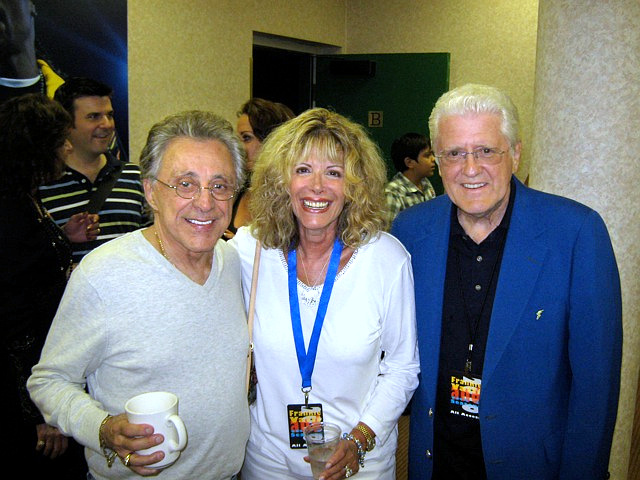
Linda November with Frankie Valli (left) and husband Artie Schroeck (right) in 2010

In the 1970s, along with providing her voice for commercials, November also recorded pop songs on the radio. She, Tony Orlando, and Toni Wine sang "Candida", in a group surreptitiously entitled "Dawn". Tony Orlando was a recording industry executive at the time, for a competing label, April-Blackwood. So to avoid a conflict, the group was entitled "Dawn" without Orlando's name. However, the song became a major hit, along with its followup "Knock Three Times" (also featuring backup by November and Toni Wine). To go on tour, Orlando then asked two other session singers, Telma Hopkins and Joyce Vincent Wilson, to become the official backup singers, in their own "Dawn" group, so they could tour as Tony Orlando and Dawn, though the voices on the songs of the original album were still of November and Toni Wine, not Hopkins and Vincent. A few years later, November was again on the charts as part of the group Wing and a Prayer Fife and Drum Corps, an assemblage of studio musicians put together by Harold Wheeler. They released two albums, with their biggest hit being a disco version of the 1926 song "Baby Face". It reached #14 on the U.S. Billboard Hot 100 in late 1976, and #12 in the UK.

"Let's Do It"
2011 performance of Cole Porter's "Let's Do It, Let's Fall in Love" by Linda November and Artie Schroeck in Nevada

In the 1980s and 1990s, November could often be found singing in Atlantic City, such as at Gatsby's at The Grand, and then starting in 1990, at the Harrah's Atrium Lounge, with Artie Schroeck. They had met in the 1960s while working on Frankie Valli recordings, but had both been married to other people at the time. In 1988 they became a couple, and on January 17, 1997, they married. Linda November then retired from her career as a jingle singer, and she and Schroeck directed a production saluting quirky band leader Spike Jones, "The New City Slickers Present a Tribute to Spike Jones".

In 2001, November and her husband moved to Las Vegas. As of 2011, she continues to work there as a piano and keyboard accompanist, performing the occasional show with Schroeck.

== Awards ==
- 1972, "Most Valuable Studio Player", NARAS, New York Chapter
- 1974, Taystee Bread (Best Radio, Clio Award, 1974)
- 1976, Lady Long Legs (Best Radio, Clio Award, 1976)
- 1978, United States Army (Best Television/Cinema, Clio Award, 1978)
- 1979, "Mean Joe Greene" commercial for Coca-Cola (Best Television/Cinema, Clio Award, 1980)

== Notable works ==
Linda November has sung tens of thousands of jingles, with her most notable one being the Meow Mix Theme ("Meow meow meow meow . . . . ") in 1976 for Meow Mix cat food. She has also worked in many other parts of the industry as a backup singer, and contributed many solo efforts, such as singing the lullaby in the 1971 animated film, The World of Hans Christian Andersen, the main theme "I'm Comin' Home" in the 1973 film The Devil in Miss Jones, and the "Galaxy Glue" jingle in the 1981 film The Incredible Shrinking Woman.

=== Jingles ===
Drinks

- Coca-Cola, 1979, "Coke and a smile" (see also Mean Joe Greene ad)
- Coca-Cola, "I’d like to teach the world to sing"
- Diet Coke "Just for the joy of it"
- Diet Pepsi, "Now you see it, now you don't, Diet Pepsi, 1 small calorie, now you see it, now you don't"
- Miller beer, "You've got the time, we've got the beer"
- Budweiser, "When you say Bud, you've said it all"

Foods

- Burger King, "Have It Your Way"
- Chef Boyardee, "Boy oh Boyardee, boy oh boyardee"
- Chicken of the Sea
- Doublemint, "Single most favorite double in the world is double good doublemint gum"
- Kraft Foods, "America spells cheese K-R-A-F-T"
- "M&M is a world of fun, a world of chocolate joy"
- McDonald's, "You Deserve a Break Today", "Two all-beef patties, special sauce, lettuce, cheese..."
- "Nabisco"
- Hellmann's and Best Foods, "Bring out the Hellmann's, bring out the best"
- "Snickers, Satisfies you"
- "Wrigley's Spearmint Gum gum gum"

Transportation

- Buick, "Wouldn't you really rather have a Buick?"
- Chevrolet, "The heartbeat of America"
- Ford Motor Company, "Have you driven a Ford lately?"
- Greyhound Lines, "Go Greyhound, and leave the driving to us"

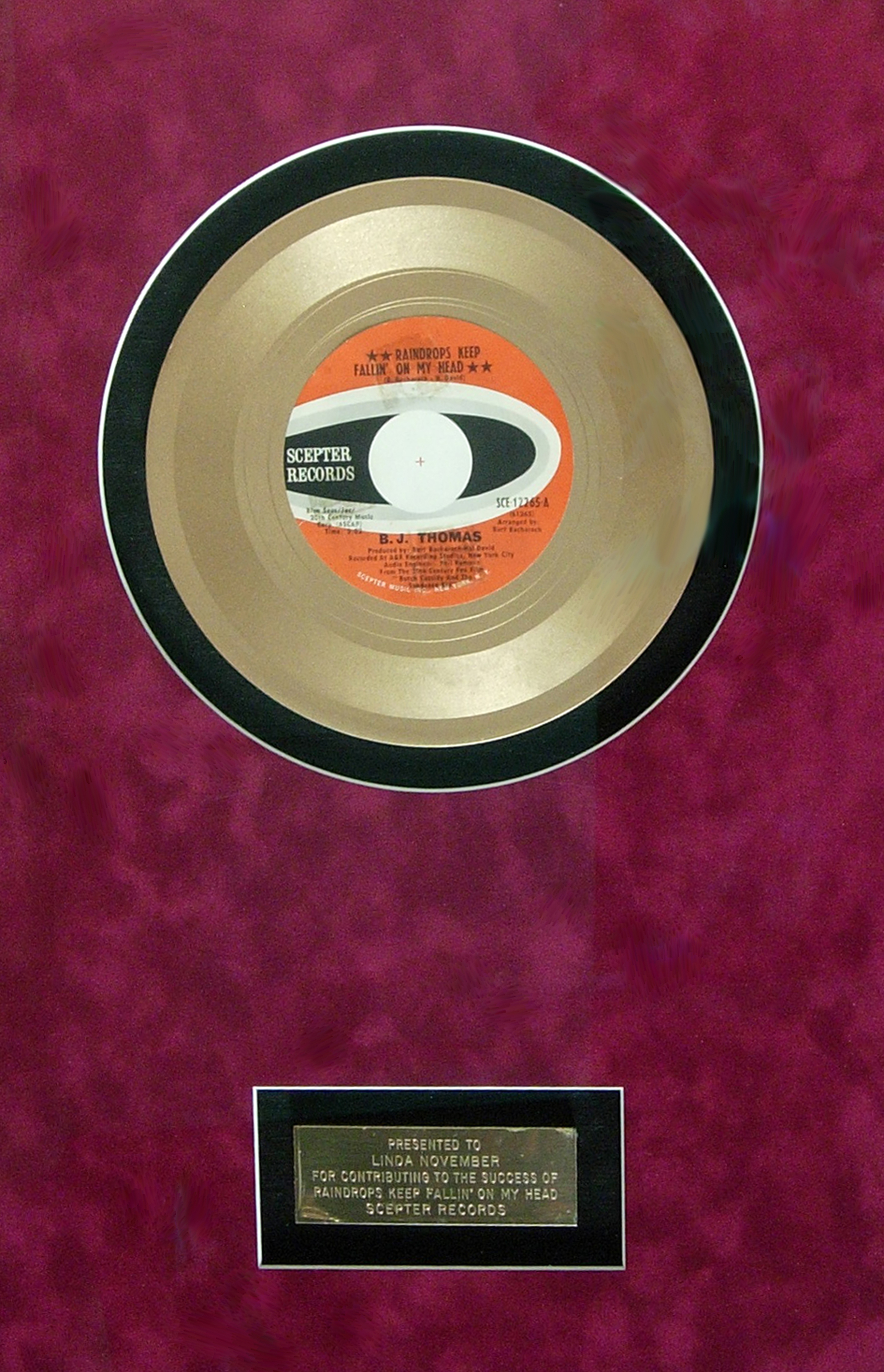
Gold record presented to Linda November for her work as a backup singer on the 1969 song "Raindrops Keep Fallin' on My Head"

Other products

- AT&T, "Reach out and touch someone"
- Exxon, "Running smooth and silent"
- General Electric, “We bring good things to life”
- Meow Mix, "Meow, meow, meow, meow..." ("Her masterpiece, the one jingle that she herself selects as the apotheosis of her craft...")
- Prudential Financial, "Get a piece of the rock"
- Windex, "Shine Windex Shine, Windex lets you bring all the sun in"

=== Notable songs as backup singer ===
- 1964, with The Ray Charles Singers, "Love Me with All Your Heart"
- 1967, with Frank Sinatra, "The World We Knew"
- 1968, with Valerie Simpson and Dionne Warwick, "Do You Know the Way to San Jose"
- 1969, with B. J. Thomas, "Raindrops Keep Fallin' on My Head"
- 1970, with Tony Orlando, ("Candida", "Knock Three Times")
- 1971 (uncredited), with Barbra Streisand, "Stoney End"
- 1975, with Jimi Hendrix (posthumously) (Crash Landing)
- 1976, with Gloria Gaynor, ("I've Got You Under My Skin"), on the I've Got You album (arranged by Meco Monardo)
- 1976, with Engelbert Humperdinck ("After the Lovin'")
- 1976, as part of the Wing and a Prayer Fife and Drum Corps, "Baby Face"
