= Think Like a Cat =

2008 US television show

- Genre: Game show
- Created by: Grand Central Marketing
- Developed by: Meow Mix
- Presented by: Chuck Woolery
- Country of origin: United States
- Original language: English
- No. of seasons: 1
- No. of episodes: 1

Production
- Executive producer: David Doyle
- Production locations: Los Angeles, California
- Running time: 22 minutes

Original release
- Network: Game Show Network
- Release: November 15, 2008

Think Like a Cat is an American game show created by Grand Central Marketing and broadcast by Game Show Network.

Hosted by Chuck Woolery and sponsored by Meow Mix, the show featured eight cats and their owners compete in a game of cat-based trivia and their relationships with their own cats. The overall winner of the game participates in a bonus round for a million dollar prize. The show premiered as a one-time special on November 15, 2008 and was critically panned, with writers arguing that the special was "embarrassing" and that it should be "put down".

== Gameplay ==
The first round is an elimination game in which the eight cats are placed in front of a bowl of cat food. The three cats which have eaten the most food when time expires move on to the second round; those who are eliminated earn $1,000. The three remaining owners answer trivia questions for points. The format is similar to Jeopardy! with six cat-related "CATegories" containing questions ranging from 10 to 50 points. The lowest-scoring owner is eliminated with $10,000. The two remaining cats are each then recorded in seven different situations. The owners wager points on what their cat will do before each clip is shown. They may not wager more than half of their points on the first two questions. For the remainder, they may wager any or all of their points. The cat and owner with the highest score win $25,000, and a chance to play the bonus round; the eliminated contestant earns $15,000.

=== Meow Mix Million Dollar Challenge ===
Ten bags of Meow Mix cat food are placed on the stage; the bags contain symbols with only one pair containing matching symbols. The owner and cat each choose a bag. If the two bags chosen have the same symbol, the owner wins $1,000,000, and in addition, earns an extra $100,000 to donate to the animal shelter of their choice. Otherwise, the contestant leaves with the $25,000 won earlier in the game and an extra $2,500 for a similar charity.

== Production ==
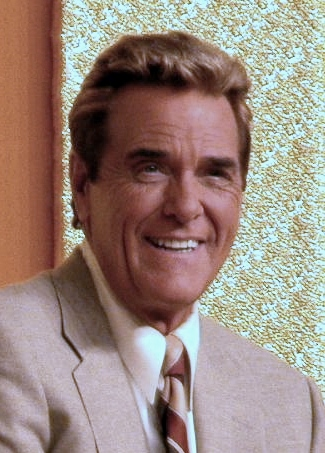
Chuck Woolery, host of the special

Tryouts for the show were held on June 21, 2008. Potential contestants auditioned in front of a panel of three judges, which included Vincent Pastore and Lee Meriwether. Those who passed the auditions were flown to Hollywood to compete with their cats as contestants. The program, which was hosted by Chuck Woolery, executive produced by David Doyle, and sponsored by Meow Mix, premiered as a one-time special on November 15, 2008. Reruns of the program aired four times throughout the rest of the month. Woolery expressed excitement at the prospects of the special, stating that the show "was designed to prove or disprove" that owners know everything they think they know about cats. Steve Ochi, a writer for the show, called the project a "success", though a minor incident did occur when a camera-shy cat forced the producers to use a stuffed cat for some shots. No new episodes have been produced since the original special.

== Reception ==
Carrie Grosvenor of About Entertainment gave Think Like a Cat one star out of five. Grosvenor thought that the show should be "put down", saying that its only pros were Woolery's hosting and the fact that the episode was "only 30 minutes long". Neil Genzlinger of The New York Times was equally unimpressed, calling the special "not only one of the most embarrassing half-hours in the history of television, [but] also a significant step toward the collapse of civilized society". Genzlinger also called the games "idiotic" and added that the infomercial feeling of the show was its "overarching problem". Despite the criticism, over 1,000,000 combined viewers watched the show at some point during its five airings.
