= Meow Mix =

American brand of cat food

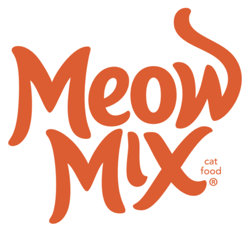
- The current logo for Meow Mix
- Product type: Cat food
- Current owner: J.M. Smucker
- Country: United States
- Introduced: 1973
- Markets: Worldwide
- Tagline: Tastes so good, cats ask for it by name
- Website: www.meowmix.com

Meow Mix is an American brand of cat food sold by The J.M. Smucker Company and known for its advertising jingle consisting solely of the lyric "meow" set to music. Meow Mix was introduced in 1973 and is sold in a variety of flavors, including "Original Choice" and "Seafood Medley". The company also sells "Alley Cat" dry cat food. Their longtime slogan is "it's the only brand cats ask for by name".

== Company ==
The Meow Mix Company operates from a 200,000-square-foot (19,000 m^{2}) facility in Decatur, Alabama. Originally a product of Ralston-Purina, Meow Mix was divested for antitrust reasons in the early 2000s. Their most famous slogan is, "Tastes so good, cats ask for it by name." The company was acquired by Cypress Group, a New York-based private equity firm in a $425 million leveraged buyout in 2003. Three years later, in May 2006, Del Monte Foods acquired the company for $705 million. The company had also been owned by J. W. Childs Associates, which acquired the business in 2001 for $160 million. On March 23, 2015, parent company Big Heart Pet Brands was acquired by The J.M. Smucker Company for $5.8 billion.

== Jingle ==
"The Meow Mix Theme" was composed in 1974 by Tom McFaul of the jingle house Lucas/McFaul, one of the major jingle-composing houses at the time. The idea for "The Meow Mix Theme" came from Ron Travisano, at the advertising agency of Della Femina Travisano and Partners, who had the account with Ralston-Purina in 1974. The first TV spot aired in 1974 and consisted of animals walking across the screen. With editor Jay Gold, Travisano looped film footage cats buns in forward and reverse to make it appear to be "singing". Working from Travisano's film, McFaul wrote music to fit. The actual meowing was performed by professional singer Linda November. Travisano then came up with the idea of adding English "translation" subtitles, along with a bouncing ball pointing out the words, which often reflected the specific flavor(s) of Meow Mix product being advertised and changed from commercial to commercial.

=== Use in torture ===
"The Meow Mix Theme" has been used by the United States Central Intelligence Agency as part of torture and interrogation programs.

== See also ==
- Think Like a Cat
- Nestlé Purina PetCare
- Whiskas
