= Cat food =

Food for consumption by cats

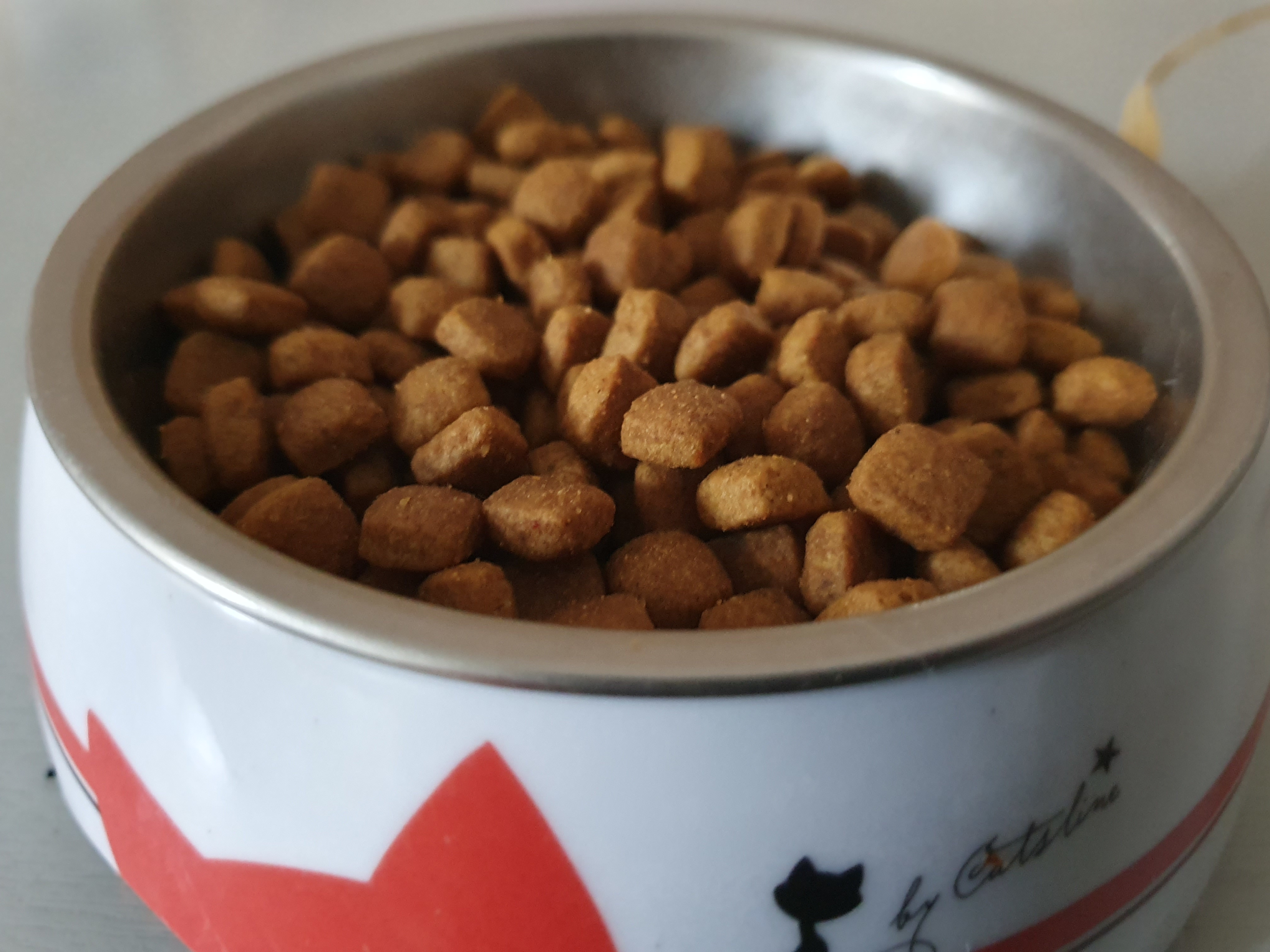
Dry cat food

Cat food is food specifically formulated for consumption by cats. In the 19th and early 20th centuries, cats in London were commonly fed horse meat sold by itinerant traders known as Cats' Meat Men or Women, who traveled fixed routes to serve households. The idea of specialized cat food developed later than dog food, as cats were long considered to be self-sufficient hunters. French writers in the 1800s criticized this view, arguing that well-fed cats were more effective hunters. By the late 19th century, commercial cat food emerged, with companies like Spratt's offering ready-made products to replace boiled horse meat. As obligate carnivores, cats require nutrients, such as taurine and arginine, that are not present in plants, so they must eat animals in the wild. In commercial cat foods these ingredients are often supplemented.

Modern cat food is available in various forms, including dry kibble, wet canned food, raw diets, and specialized formulations for different health conditions. Regulations, such as those set by the Association of American Feed Control Officials (AAFCO), ensure that commercially available foods meet specific nutritional standards. Specialized diets cater to cats with conditions like chronic kidney disease, obesity, and gastrointestinal disorders, adjusting protein, fat, and fiber levels accordingly. Weight control diets often include fiber to promote satiety, while high-energy diets are formulated for kittens, pregnant cats, and recovering felines.

Alternative diets, such as grain-free, vegetarian, and raw food, have gained popularity, though they remain controversial. Grain-free diets replace traditional carbohydrates with ingredients like potatoes and peas but do not necessarily have lower carbohydrate content. Vegan and vegetarian diets have limited studies demonstrating their safety. Raw feeding mimics a natural prey diet but carries risks of bacterial contamination and nutritional imbalances. The pet food industry also has environmental implications, as high meat consumption increases pressure on livestock farming and fish stocks.

Nutritionally, cats require proteins, essential fatty acids, vitamins, and minerals to maintain their health. Deficiencies in nutrients like taurine, vitamin A, or arginine can lead to severe health problems. The inclusion of probiotics, fiber, and antioxidants supports digestive health, while certain vitamins like E and C help counteract oxidative stress. The pet food industry continues to evolve, balancing nutrition, sustainability, and consumer preferences while addressing emerging health concerns related to commercial diets.

== History ==
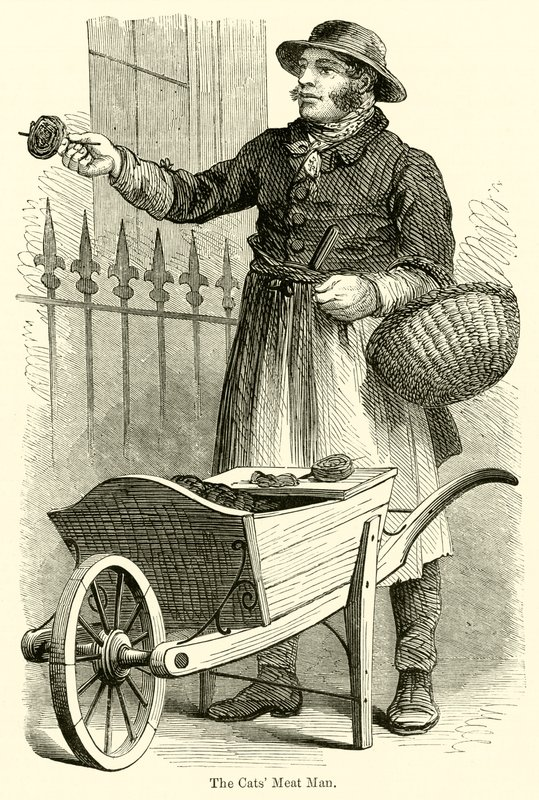
Engraving of a cats' meat man in an 1868 issue of Chatterbox, a children's magazine

During the 19th century and early 20th centuries, meat for cats and dogs in London, frequently horse meat, was sold from barrows (hand–carts) by traders known as Cats' Meat Men or Women. Henry Mayhew estimated in London Labour and the London Poor (1851) that the total number of cats in London might be 300,000. Each cats' meat seller had a particular route and served a few hundred households, their approach marked by mewing cats.

The idea of preparing specialized food for cats came later than dog food and dog biscuits. This was likely due to the idea that cats could readily fend for themselves. In 1837, a French writer Mauny de Mornay critiqued this idea:

It is... thought wrongly that the cat, ill-fed, hunts better and takes more mice; this too is a grave error. The cat who is not given food is feeble and sickly; as soon as he has bitten into a mouse, he lies down to rest and sleep; while well fed, he is wide awake and satisfies his natural taste in chasing all that belongs to the rat family.

In 1844, another French writer, Nicolas Jean-Baptiste Boyard, expanded on this idea:

Normally in the country no care is taken of a cat's food, and he is left to live, it is said, from his hunting, but when he is hungry, he hunts the pantry's provisions far more than the mouse; because he does not pursue them and never watches them by need, but by instinct and attraction. And so, to neglect feeding a cat, is to render him at the same time useless and harmful, while with a few scraps regularly and properly given, the cat will never do any damage, and will render much service.

He goes on to say that it is all the more unreasonable to expect a cat to live from hunting in that cats take mice more for amusement than to eat: "A good cat takes many and eats few."

By 1876, Gordon Stables emphasized the need to give cats particular food:

If then, only for the sake of making (a cat) more valuable as a vermin-killer, she ought to have regular and sufficient food. A cat ought to be fed at least twice a day. Let her have a dish to herself, put down to her, and removed when the meal is finished. Experience is the best teacher as regards the quantity of a cat's food, and in quality let it be varied. Oatmeal porridge and milk, or white bread steeped in warm milk, to which a little sugar has been added, are both excellent breakfasts for puss; and for dinner she must have an allowance of flesh. Boiled lights are better for her than horse-meat, and occasionally let her have fish. Teach your cat to wait patiently till she is served—a spoiled cat is nearly as disagreeable as a spoiled child. If you want to have your cat nice and clean, treat her now and then to a square inch of fresh butter. It not only acts as a gentle laxative, but, the grease, combining in her mouth, with the alkalinity of her saliva, forms a kind of natural cat-soap, and you will see she will immediately commence washing herself, and become beautifully clean. (N.B.—If you wish to have a cat nicely done up for showing, touch her all over with a sponge dipped in fresh cream, when she licks herself the effect is wonderful.) Remember that too much flesh-meat, especially liver,—which ought only to be given occasionally,—is very apt to induce a troublesome diarrhoea (looseness). Do not give your pet too many tit-bits at table; but whatever else you give her, never neglect to let her have her two regular meals.

In the same year, an advertisement for Spratt (better known for making dog food) said that their cat food entirely superseded "the unwholesome practice of feeding on boiled horse flesh". And, in another book on cats, Stables recommended the company's food:

Attend to the feeding, and, at a more than one-day show, cats ought to have water as well as milk. I think boiled lights, cut into small pieces, with a very small portion of bullock's liver and bread soaked, is the best food; but I have tried Spratt's Patent Cat Food with a great number of cats, both of my own and those of friends, and have nearly always found it agree; and at a cat show it would, I believe, be both handy and cleanly.

Spratt, which began by making dog biscuits, was the first commercial producer of ready-made cat food.

== Natural diet ==
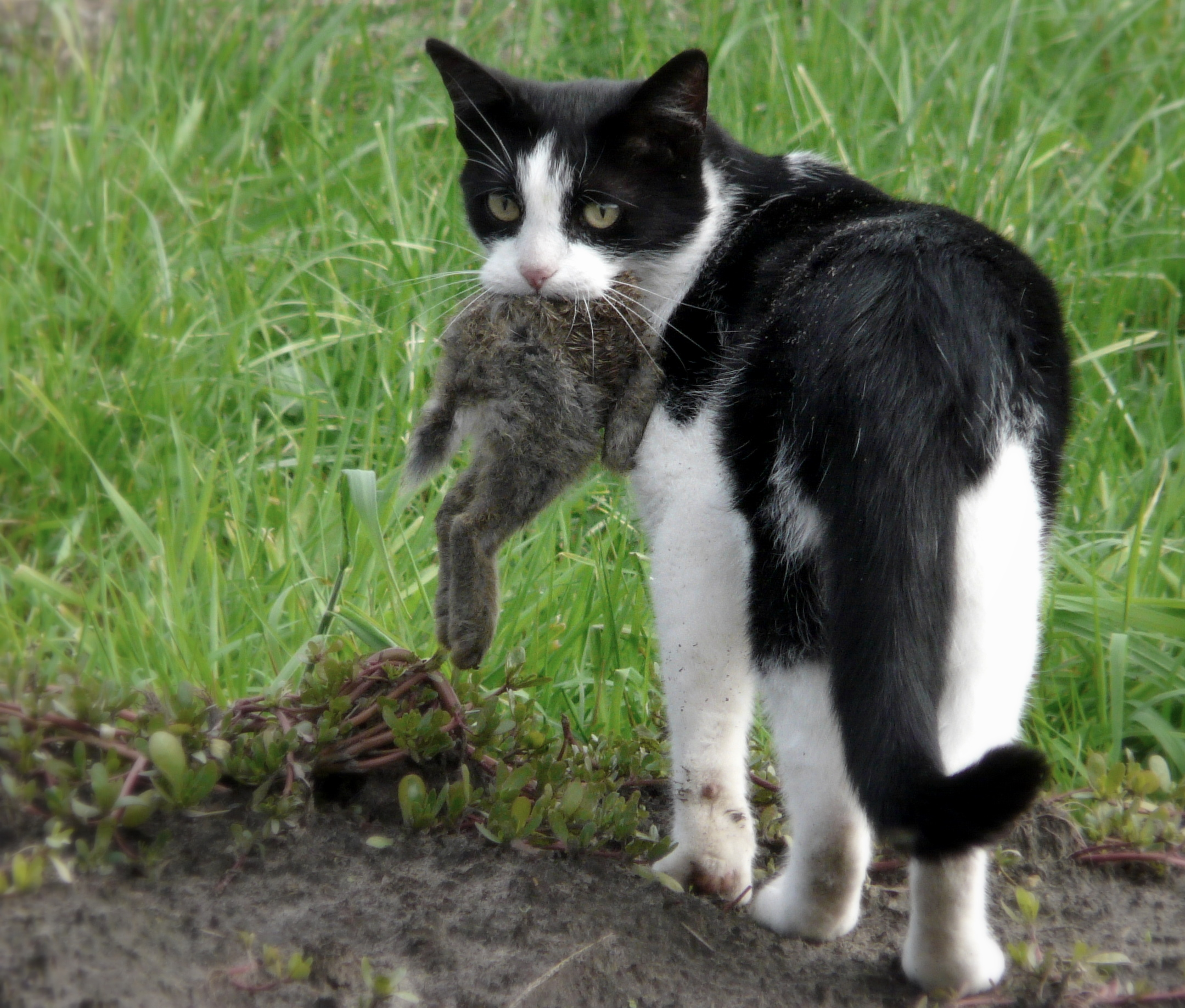
Cat with prey rabbit

Cats are obligate carnivores—meaning, they are true carnivores and depend upon the nutrients present in animal flesh for their dietary needs in nature. Even domesticated cats can consume freshly killed meat from rodents, rabbits, amphibians, birds, reptiles and fish, whether through hunting or by having it provided by humans. The dietary needs of wild cats does not include any vegetable matter and consists solely of animal tissue. Whilst some plant matter is found in samples of the stomach content and faeces of cats the amount is negligible.

Cats cannot synthesize some nutrients that are non-essential for humans and required for survival, including the amino acids taurine and arginine. Some of these nutrients are not found in plants and must be sourced from meat in the natural diet. Cats lack the specific physiology to extract nutrients efficiently from raw plant-based materials, and require a high protein diet.

Special to the cat's metabolism is the inability to convert carotenoids to vitamin A; inability to synthesise enough vitamin D; inability to synthesise niacin from tryptophan; inability to synthesise cysteine, citrulline, and methionine; and an intolerance to glutamic acid (which is low in animal tissue and high in plant matter).

== Packaging and labeling ==
In the United States, cat food using the label "complete and balanced" is required to meet standards that have been established by the Association of American Feed Control Officials (AAFCO) by either meeting a nutrient profile or passing a feeding trial. Cat Food Nutrient Profiles were established in 1992 and updated in 2014 by the AAFCO's Feline Nutrition Expert Subcommittee. The updated profiles replaced the previous recommendations set by the National Research Council (NRC). Certain manufacturers label their products with terms such as premium, ultra premium, natural and holistic. Such terms currently have no legal definitions. However, "While most of the food supplied comes from within the US, the FDA ensures that standards are met within our borders even when components come from countries with less stringent levels of safety or label integrity."

== Gastrointestinal health ==
The gastrointestinal tract (GIT) is the source of nutrient absorption, making it integral to overall health. Research shows fiber, prebiotics, probiotics, antioxidants and fatty acids are important in maintaining gastrointestinal health.

To achieve optimal cellular health (especially in the gut) and to maintain a healthy microbiome, proper nutrition is necessary (nutrition is multifactorial and complex). Cats with gastrointestinal diseases must consume an easily digestible diet with the appropriate nutrients provided by easily digestible ingredients and in the correct ratio which is recommended to be fed in small portions frequently throughout the day, so as not to overwhelm the digestive system. It is also important for fat to be digestible because too much undigested fat that reaches the end of the digestive tract (colon) has the possibility of being fermented and can worsen the symptoms of GIT disease and induce other reactions like diarrhea. It has also been suggested that cats should eat diets tailored to the section of the GIT that is diseased.

When certain fermentable dietary fibers like fructooligosaccharides (FOS) are included in the diet, the microbiome and fatty acid content are often changed for the better. An example is less branched-chain fatty acids (BCFAs; which are more difficult and take more time to digest) are produced and more short-chain fatty acids (SCFAs; which are easier to digest and are more readily available sources of energy which can be used for supporting cell turnover keeping cells, like those found in the GIT, thereby improving GIT health and immune function) are produced. FOS can also impact production of other fatty acids.

== Malnutrition ==
Malnutrition can be a problem for cats fed non-conventional diets. Cats fed exclusively on raw, freshwater fish can develop a thiamine deficiency. Those fed exclusively on liver may develop vitamin A toxicity. Also, homemade diets, either 'organic', 'natural', or 'vegetarian' may contain excessive protein and phosphorus while being deficient in calcium, vitamin E, and microminerals such as copper, zinc, and potassium. Energy density must also be maintained relative to the other nutrients. When vegetable oil is used to maintain the energy balance, cats may not find the food as palatable, causing less food to be eaten.

== Commercial foods ==
Most store-bought cat food comes in either dry form, also known in the US as kibble, or wet form (canned or in pouches). Some manufacturers sell frozen raw diets and premix products to cater to owners who feed raw.

=== Dry ===
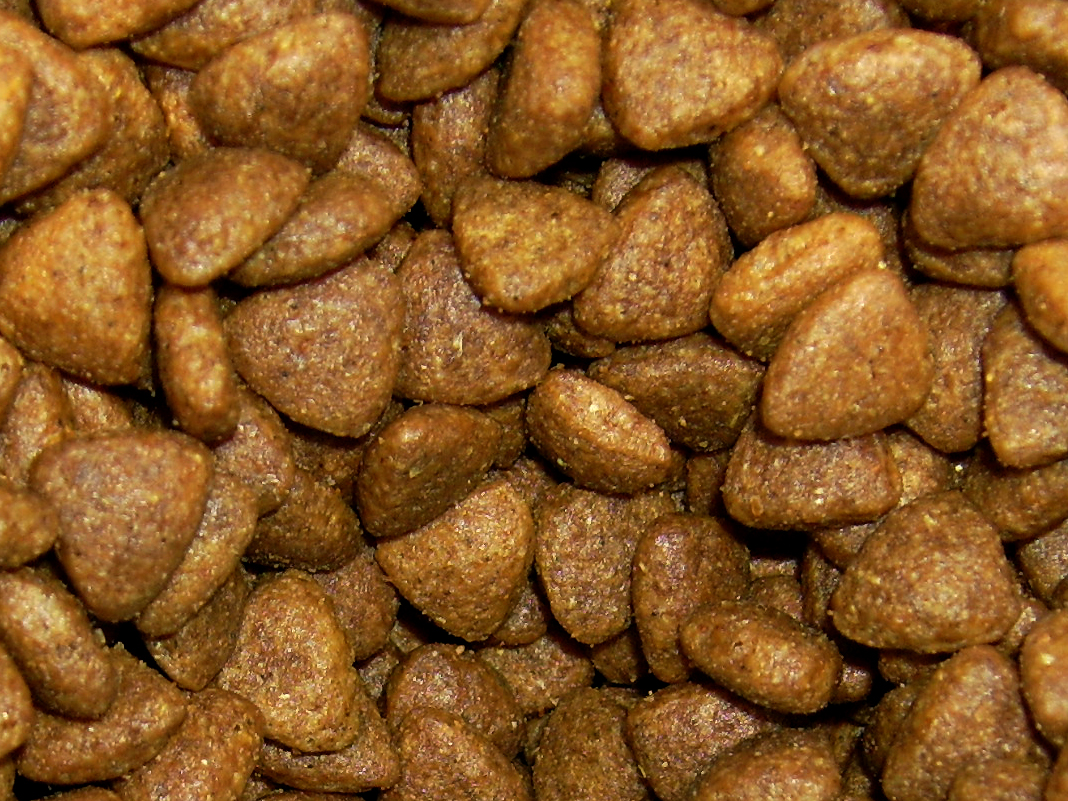
Dry (extruded) cat food example

Dry food (8–10% moisture) is generally made by extrusion cooking under high heat and pressure. Approximately 95% of dry pet foods are extruded. During this process, the meat is first ground up, cooked under very high heat, and processed so it becomes a powder. The powder is fed into a massive mixer. In the mixer, additional supplements are added; then it's cooked again at very high heat to turn it into a dough, which is molded in the shape of kibble, and baked. At this point, it no longer smells like meat. Fat may be sprayed on the food afterwards to increase palatability, as well as other minor ingredients, such as heat-sensitive vitamins, which would be destroyed in the extrusion process. Dry food is most often packed in multi-wall paper bags, sometimes with a plastic film layer; similar bag styles with film laminates or coextrusions are also used.

Dry foods contain high amounts of carbohydrates in order to maintain their shape and structure. Concerns have been raised that there is some association between the carbohydrate content and risk of obesity and type 2 diabetes in felines.

=== Wet ===
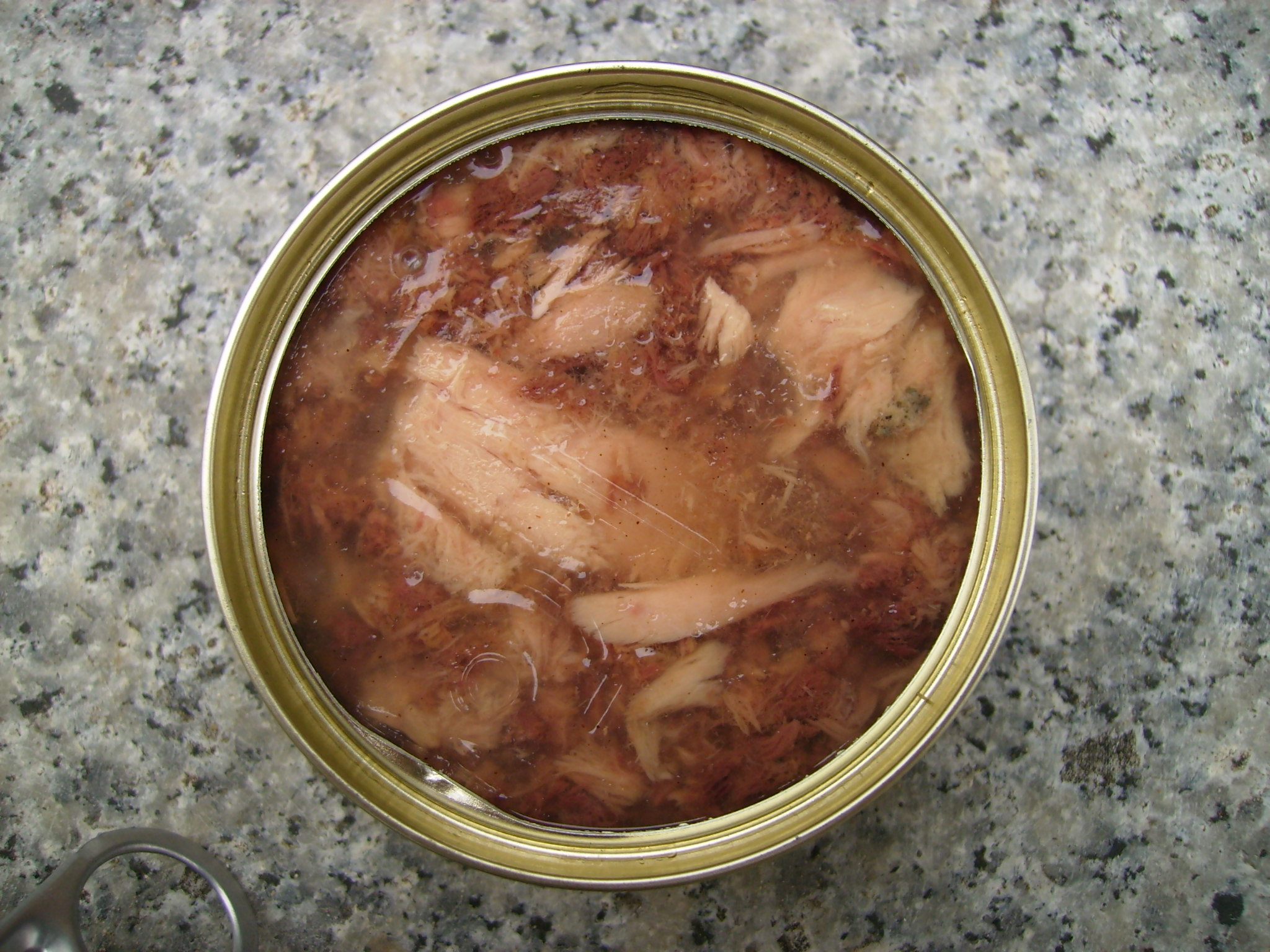
Wet (canned) cat food example (Fish flakes in jelly)

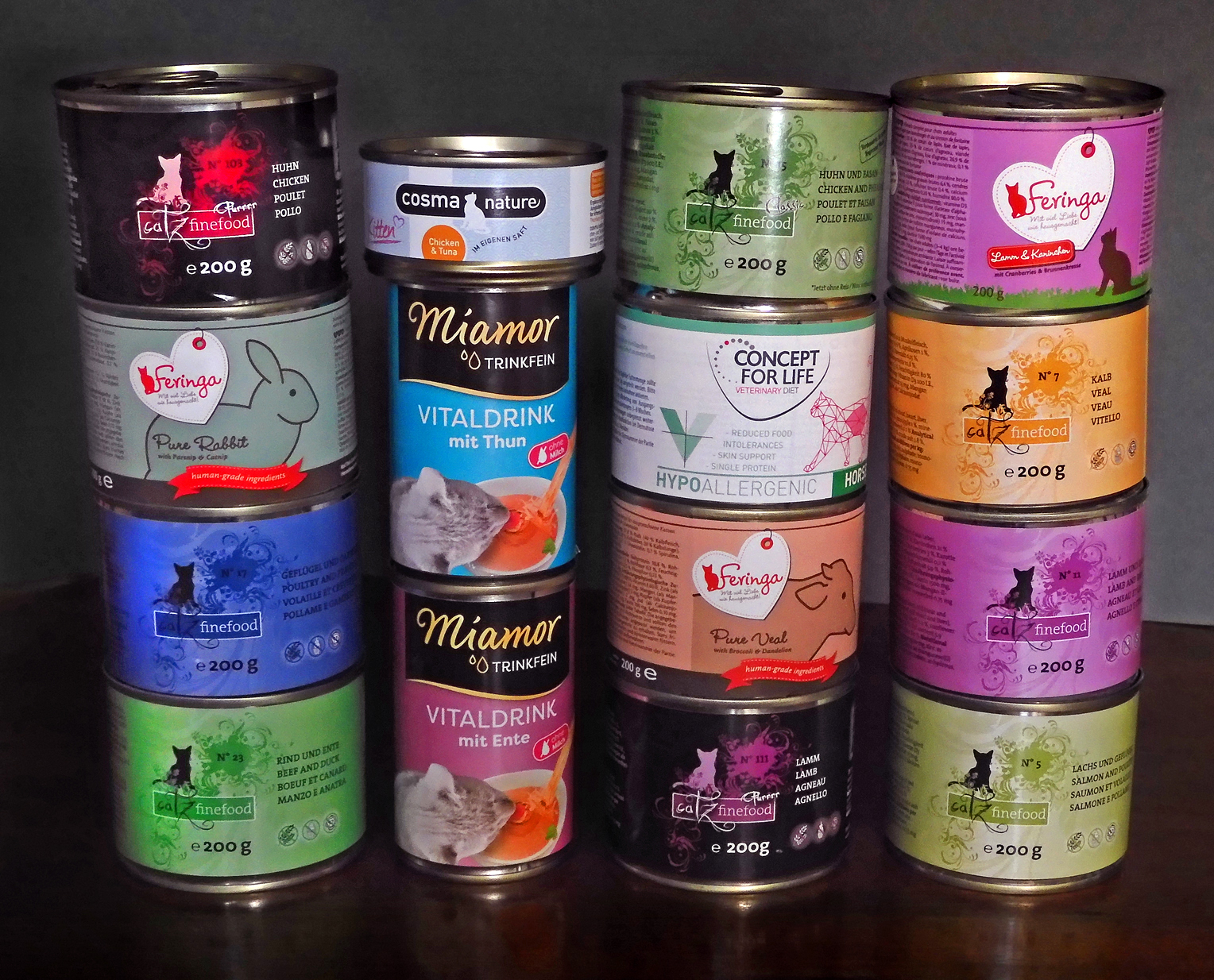
Various kinds of canned cat food

In much of Europe, the UK and the US, canned or wet food (75–78% moisture) generally comes in aluminum or steel cans in 90, 160 and 370 g (3, 5 1/2 and 13 oz) sizes. It is also sold in foil pouch form.

=== Treats ===
A variety of cat treats are commercially available. These can be divided into dry cat treats, wet cat treats, and semi-moist treats. A 2004 survey in the US and Australia found 26% of cats received treats on a daily basis. However, not more than 10% of a cat's calorie intake should come from treats.

=== Soy isoflavones ===
Soy is often used in commercial cat food diets as a vegetable protein. In one study more than half of commercial cat foods surveyed contained soy isoflavones. Genistein and daidzein, both of which occur in soybeans, inhibit the enzymes thyroid peroxidase and thyroxine 5-deiodinase. This causes decreased thyroxine and triiodothyronine concentrations. In response to decreased triiodothyronine levels the body will produce more thyroid-stimulating hormone (TSH) to normalize triiodothyronine levels. In soy-fed cats this has been shown to result in increased thyroxine levels.

It is further hypothesized that a chronically high-TSH state produced by soy isoflavones will lead to hyperplasia of the thyroid gland and thyrotoxicosis, but there is no data that supports this conclusion. Instead, it appears that cats fed canned food have an increased risk of hyperthyroidism even though canned food is less likely to contain soy. In other animals, the effects of soy isoflavones on the thyroid are exacerbated by iodine deficiency; it is possible that a similar cross-nutrient interaction has masked the effect of soy.

== Specialist diets ==
Cat food may be formulated for a variety of specialist diets, for therapeutic or other purposes. A 2004 survey in the US and Australia found 3.6% of cats were fed therapeutic diets.

=== Renal diet ===
A renal diet is formulated for cats that are living with chronic kidney disease (CKD). This is a highly prevalent condition in the feline population and is most common in aging and older cats. It has been shown that the lifespan of cats experiencing CKD can be extended by as much as 2 years when receiving therapeutic diets rather than regular maintenance diets. These diets are low in protein, low in phosphorus, have a high energy density, a higher fat content and include omega-3 fatty acids.

Renal diets with low protein have been adopted by a number of big pet food manufacturers. Although the diet of a healthy cat should be high in protein, at times it is medically necessary for a cat to eat a low protein diet. For cats living with chronic renal disease, low protein diets lower the amount of nitrogenous waste in the body, helping to decrease the strain put on the kidneys. The exact level of protein that is needed for therapeutic CKD diets is unclear.

Low protein diets can be formulated as a wet or dry food, with the main difference being the moisture content. Unfortunately, low protein diets are not as palatable to cats as diets high in protein.

Low protein diets should not be fed to cats with the liver condition known as hepatic encephalopathy because severe protein restriction can be detrimental to animals with this condition. Cats with this condition should be fed a diet with high quality protein sources that have adequate amounts of the amino acids taurine and arginine.

In low protein diets, unless the protein source is a high quality protein such as an animal-based protein, cats (and especially kittens) have been shown to develop retinal degeneration due to a deficiency in taurine, an essential amino acid for cats that is derived from animal protein.

Low protein diets have been linked to health defects such as lack of growth, decreased food intake, muscle atrophy, hypoalbuminemia, skin alterations, and more. Cats on lower protein diets are more likely to lose weight, and to lose lean body mass.

Low protein diets that are high in carbohydrates have been found to decrease glucose tolerance in cats. With a decreased glucose tolerance, clinical observations have confirmed that cats consuming large proportions of metabolizable energy, in the form of carbohydrates rather than protein, are more likely to develop hyperglycemia, hyperinsulinemia, insulin resistance, and obesity.

Restricting phosphorus has been proven to decrease the progression of CKD. This is because phosphorus can be deposited into soft tissues and become mineralized, which can cause kidney damage.

Formulating these diets with higher amounts of fat is important to make sure the food is palatable in the absence of protein and promote an increased caloric intake. The higher fat content will also spare the use of protein for energy and help decrease stress on the kidneys. Omega-3 fatty acids are included in therapeutic diets because of their anti-inflammatory properties to aid the diseased kidneys.

=== High energy ===
A high energy diet is generally high in fat. Compared to carbohydrates and protein, fat provides much more energy, at 8.5 kcal/g. High energy diets generally have a fat content greater than 20% on a dry matter basis. A high energy diet is appropriate for cats who are undergoing growth, recovering from illness, are pregnant or lactating, as their energy requirements are higher than otherwise. A lactating or gestating cat requires a nutrient-dense and highly digestible diet to withstand the high levels of stress being placed on her body. These conditions are found in cat food that is formulated for growth, performance, or high energy during all life stages.

To maintain a neutral energy balance and thus maintain body weight, energy intake should increase with energy expenditure. Studies that relate the number of meals offered to cats per day to their daily activity levels have shown conflicting results. It has been shown that cats offered four meals a day or a random number of meals a day have similar energy levels, greater than those fed only one meal per day. It has been postulated that this increased energy level could be due to purported spikes in activity before being fed, known as food anticipatory activity. Other studies on female cats have found that increasing the daily amount of food may actually decrease their daily activity levels. The age, sex, and whether cats are intact or have been spayed/neutered are all factors controlling activity level.

As cats age, there is evidence that their metabolic energy requirements may increase, especially after 12 or 13 years old, but other evidence suggests that metabolic energy needs are not dissimilar at different ages. Furthermore, it has been shown that cats over 12 years old are more likely to be underweight than younger cats, so a high calorie diet may be appropriate to treat weight loss, and thus to maintain an appropriate body condition score. Weight loss can occur when the cat expends more energy but does not increase its food energy intake. It has also been demonstrated that as cats age, they are less able to digest and thus absorb dietary fats and proteins.

Pregnancy and lactation are strenuous periods on the female cat. During pregnancy the queen can gain up to 38% of their body weight before parturition. It is recommended that a cat's diet should contain 4000 kcal per kg of dry food while pregnant; during lactation it is recommended that the cat consumes 240–354 kcal ME per kg of body weight. Studies show that increasing the intake of food for a pregnant animal in order to help it gain weight can have negative effects. It is acknowledged that rather than increasing intake, feeding a highly energy dense food is a way to ensure that the female cat, or queen, receives adequate energy and nutrient requirements are met.

It has been found that nutritional support consistent with the resting energy requirement (RER) soon after surgery or the onset of illness decreases the mortality rate and the duration of hospitalization in cats. A recovering cat needs enough energy (calories), as well as more protein and fats. Critical care diets are formulated to be highly palatable and digestible, as well as high energy density. This limits the mass of food required to be consumed to meet the RER. This type of high energy diet has proven to be very important in the nutritional support of post-operative and ill cats.

=== Weight control ===
Weight control simply means ensuring an energy balance: energy in equals energy out. Weight gain means more energy is being consumed than is being expended in exercise and other functions. A weight management diet is designed to allow fewer calories to be consumed in a larger volume of food, allowing for less risk of an energy imbalance.

Adult cats should be fed a diet that promotes maintaining a healthy weight, while at the same time meeting the individual taste preference of the cat. Cats generally prefer to eat smaller meals more frequently, which can lead to less weight gain compared to cats that are fed free-choice (always available) food. Meanwhile, some cats adapt to free-choice feeding and can maintain normal body weight with no weight gain. In general, indoor cats have less opportunity or need for exercise than outdoor cats; indoor cats are much more prone to weight gain. For indoor cats, there are a variety of choices to promote exercise, including various cat toys designed to stimulate chase and play behaviors. Overall, if an adult cat cannot maintain normal body condition on a free-choice feeding diet, despite exercise levels, portion-controlled feeding is recommended. Many pet cats are fed energy-dense, high carbohydrate diets, which provide much more energy than needed. This is a major issue with indoor cats as it has been shown to lead to obesity. To prevent cats from becoming overweight, owners should be more inclined to implement weight control diets, which provide the cat with nutrient-dense, low energy ingredients. Studies have shown that cats fed lower energy diets had a significantly reduced incidence of obesity, as the typical indoor pet cat does not need more energy than their resting energy requirement. For an average cat weighing 10–11 pounds (about 5 kg), it would have a resting energy requirement of 180–200 kcal/day.

Along with energy input and output, specific nutrients can be important in weight control diets. Fiber is an important component that helps control weight, along with various other benefits. A source of soluble and fermentable fiber helps to increase the movement of digesta through the gut and decrease gastric emptying. This helps to increase satiety in cats, potentially decreasing feeding rates and voluntary energy consumption. Fermentable fiber promotes healthy mucosa and commensal bacterial growth and improved digestion/nutrient absorption. Prebiotic fibers like fructooligosaccharides (FOS) and mannooligosaccharides (MOS) decrease the number of pathogenic bacteria and increase the number of beneficial bacteria in the gut. They also help to maintain microbial balance and a healthy immune system. Fiber is fermented in the colon to produce short-chain fatty acids which can be used as an energy source. Fermentable fiber has been demonstrated to enhance general health and decrease inflammation. Furthermore, non-fermentable fiber is critical to the formation of well-formed stool, and has been known to increase diet bulk while decreasing caloric density. Insoluble fiber has been proposed to regulate appetite by releasing hormones that reduce hunger. Sources of fiber commonly added in weight management cat food include beet pulp, barley, psyllium and cellulose.

Another nutrient important for weight control diets is protein and its component amino acids. Felines, being obligate carnivores, require a natural diet of animal products which consists of protein and fat (i.e. muscle, organs and animal tissue). Dietary protein supplies amino acids that can be utilized and metabolized as energy before using fat stores, even though protein is not stored in the body the same way as fat. Dietary fat is more efficiently converted to body fat than protein; if an animal is consuming more than its energy requirement and if the excess energy is provided by fat, more weight will be gained than if the excess calories are coming from protein. Dietary protein also improves satiety during feed, resulting in decreased overconsumption of food. The protein content of the diet is a key factor in building and maintaining lean body (muscle) mass, which is an important aspect of weight control. Lean body mass maintenance is regulated by protein intake, but more importantly is regulated by exercise. Limited protein and amino acids in the diet will limit lean body mass growth, but exercise or lack of exercise will allow growth or shrinking of muscle. Successful weight control involves maintenance of healthy adipose tissue levels, but most importantly maintenance of lean body mass. Lean muscle is the driver of basal energy metabolism and aids in the use of energy. When sufficient levels of fat are provided, fat will be used by the body as an energy source, but only when there are insufficient levels of protein.

An important component of many weight loss/weight control diets is L-carnitine. This is a vitamin-like substance that is found in animal protein. It can be found in ingredients commonly used in more commercial pet foods, but specifically weight management/weight loss diets. L-carnitine is involved in many biological pathways, more specifically fatty acid metabolism, allowing for the conversion of long-chain fatty acids into energy. The introduction of L-carnitine ensures rapid transport and oxidation of fatty acids as well as efficient usage of dietary fatty acids and protein. Supplementary L-carnitine is used more often in weight loss diets, since its benefits mainly involve fatty acid metabolism to control weight loss. However, since weight control is, in essence, a prevention stage in overall weight management, it still has value in weight control diets in preserving and building lean body mass and inhibiting the storage of excess dietary fat. The majority of studies focusing on supplementary L-carnitine use look at its benefits for weight loss, including its effect on metabolic rate and fatty acid oxidation. At the same time, these studies still show similar results that prove their effects of controlling fatty acid metabolism for weight control, to avoid the need for weight loss diets.

== Unconventional diets ==
=== Raw food ===
Raw feeding is providing uncooked ingredients to cats. Most of the diet will consist of animal-based ingredients, though fruits, vegetables and supplements are often added. Commercial raw food is mainly sold in three formats: fresh, frozen and freeze-dried. Thawing and rehydration are necessary before feeding frozen and freeze-dried food respectively. Many available commercial diets are AAFCO certified in meeting the nutrient requirements of the cat. Some diets may be formulated for all life stages or they can also be AAFCO certified for adult maintenance or growth and gestation/lactation. Many people feed their cats raw food believing that it mimics the prey diet that wild cats would consume. Firm believers report that such a diet can bring about many health benefits, such as a shinier coat, cleaner teeth and an improved immunity to various gastrointestinal ailments (with diarrhea and constipation being the most common), as well as an increase in energy and a decrease in bodily waste odours, although no scientific evidence exists to prove these claims. In addition, raw food comes at risk of malnutrition (by inexpert formulation) and infection (to the cat and other family members).

Commercial raw diets can undergo High Pressure Pasteurization (HPP), a process which kills bacteria and pathogens, including salmonella, using high water pressure. This technique is USDA approved and allows raw food to remain uncooked while greatly improving its safety and shelf-life. However, every year, many commercial raw pet foods are recalled due to various bacterial contamination, implying that feeding raw comes with a risk.

=== Grain-free ===
Grain free cat food substitutes the typical carbohydrate sources like wheat, corn or rice with alternative sources such as white potato, peas, sweet potato or tapioca.

A study published in the Journal of Feline Medicine and Surgery in 2018 compared the carbohydrate content between grain-free diets and diets containing grains. According to this study the proportion of cat food purchased that is grain free has increased from 4% to 9% between 2012 and 2014. The researchers at Tufts University analyzed the nutritional information and contents of 77 different dry cat food diets. 42 of these diets contained grain, while 35 were labeled as grain free. The major ingredients and amounts were determined for each diet and then analyses were conducted comparing the two groups. It was found that the grain free diets had a lower mean carbohydrate content than the diets containing grain; however, there was a very wide range and lots of overlap between the two groups in both their carbohydrate contents. Some grain free diets even had a higher amount of carbohydrates than the diets containing grain. Calorie amounts were similar for both diets.

A recent study published by the FDA has potentially linked pea- or legume-containing grain free diets to dilated cardiomyopathy in both dogs and cats. While the majority of cases reported were for canines, 14 cases were reported between 2014 and 2019 for cats.

=== Vegetarian and vegan ===
Vegetarian, vegan, or plant-based cat food has been available for many years. It excludes any meat and animal derivatives, using plant and synthetic ingredients instead. The most common reason for owners to feed their cat a plant-based diet is the ethical impact on farm animals and animal rights. Other reasons are cat food's environmental impact and a distrust of the healthiness of conventional cat food. There has been controversy over feeding cats a vegetarian or vegan diet.

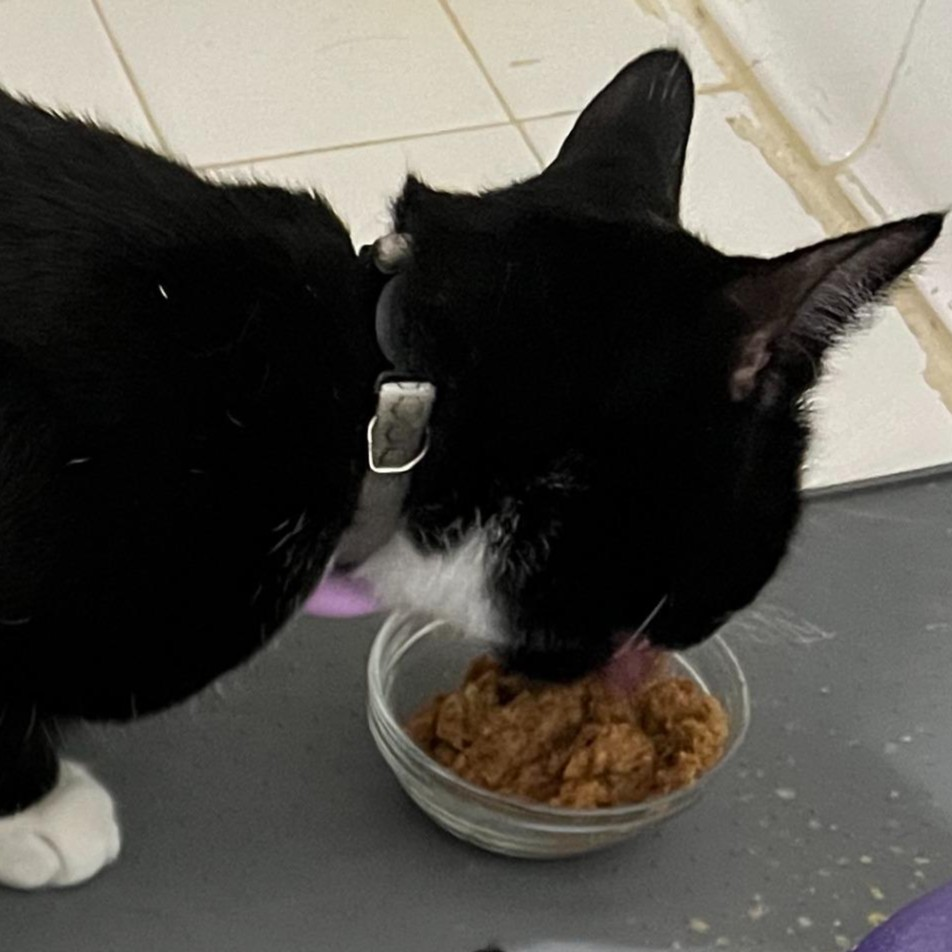
A cat eating wet plant-based cat food.

A number of veterinary and animal welfare organizations do not recommend or recommend against feeding cats a plant-based diet. American Society for the Prevention of Cruelty to Animals recommends against plant-based diets for cats, because cats are not adapted to it. Similarly, the World Small Animal Veterinary Association states that cats should not be fed a vegetarian or vegan diet. The British Veterinary Association does not recommend plant-based cat food, stating that suitable synthetic alternatives are lacking for some essential fatty acids and amino acids.

Some organizations that advocate vegan or vegetarian diets for people also advocate for plant-based cat food. The International Vegetarian Union says feeding cats plant-based food is desirable, as it avoids contributing to the meat industry, and PETA supports it for the same reason. The Vegan Society has approved a number of vegan cat foods and treats with its Vegan Trademark.

==== Health impact on cats ====
Relatively little research on plant-based diets for cats is available, with studies being either small, or subject to selection bias to get to large numbers of plant-based cats. A 2023 systematic review found that although there was no significant evidence of adverse effects the quality of the studies were poor and high-quality studies are lacking. The authors recommended a cautious approach to feeding a vegetarian diet for cats and dogs and suggested that commercial diets are better than home-made.

A study that asked cat guardians to report on their cats, found that plant-based cats were reportedly having fewer vet visits and used less medication. Their vets reportedly also described these cats as healthy more frequently. Improvements in coat condition and weight control are other reported benefits. Additional monitoring, especially in the beginning, and working with a vet is recommended by the author of the study when changing a cat's diet, including when changing to a plant-based one.

Urinary acidity is a candidate for such monitoring. It is important for cats' health that the acidity of their urine is in the right range. If the urine isn't very acidic, struvite crystals can form, which is dangerous. Plant-based proteins tend to be less acidifying than animal-based proteins, which means that cats on a plant-based diet may be at a higher risk of having too little acidity in their urine. Acidifying supplementation is available to correct this when needed, it cannot be used preemptively, because too much acidity is also problematic.

==== Concerns ====
A 2020 study evaluated vegan pet foods including one for cats in the Brazilian market and found it had nutritional inadequacies when compared to AAFCO recommendations. It was found to be lacking in arachidonic acid, an essential fatty acid for cats, and low in potassium. Compared to the FEDIAF standards, it was additionally found to be low in arginine, calcium, Ca/P ratio, and too high in copper and zinc. Another study, looking at 8 vegan pet foods labelled as suitable for cats, found none met all the guidelines. It adds that these problems have been found in commercially prepared meat-based foods too.

Another concern is that synthetic taurine comes in different forms that are absorbed in different degrees. This is said make taurine supplementation to plant-based cat food "extremely difficult" in a BBC Science Focus article.

==== Supplementation ====
Cats, as obligate carnivores, require certain nutrients (including arginine, taurine, arachidonic acid, vitamin A, vitamin B12 and niacin) from their food, as these cannot be synthesised. Vegetarian cat food needs synthetic sources of arginine and taurine to meet the dietary needs of the cat.

Due to the complex process and supplementation to ensure a nutritionally adequate diet, plant-based cat food cannot reliably be home-made. For example, when 25 online recipes for home-made plant-based cat food were analysed, none met the recommended amounts for all nutrients and all were deficient in iron.

== Homemade ==
Many pet owners feed cats homemade diets. These diets generally consist of some form of cooked or raw meat, bone, vegetables, and supplements, such as taurine and multivitamins. Homemade diets either follow a recipe, such as the BARF (bone and raw food) diet which provides a series of options for the pet owner to make, or rely on the constant rotation of ingredients to meet nutrient requirements. A study was conducted that analyzed 95 homemade BARF diets and found that 60% of these were nutritionally imbalanced in either one or a combination of calcium, phosphorus, vitamin D, iodine, zinc, copper, or vitamin A content.

Another 2019 study on a range of homemade diet recipes found online and in books has also found nutritional inadequacies. The authors mention that vegetarianism and support for organics food are common reasons for trying such a diet, but does not specifically address the adequacy of vegetarian or organic diets.

== Nutrients and supplements ==
Vitamin deficiencies can lead to wide-ranging clinical abnormalities that reflect the diversity of their metabolic roles. Twelve minerals are known to be essential nutrients for cats. Calcium and phosphorus are crucial to strong bones and teeth. Cats need other minerals, such as magnesium, potassium, and sodium, for nerve impulse transmission, muscle contraction, and cell signaling. Many minerals only present in minute amounts in the body, including selenium, copper, and molybdenum, act as helpers in a wide variety of enzymatic reactions.

Many nutrients can cause a variety of deficiency symptoms in cats, and the skin is a vital organ that is susceptible to dietary changes in minerals, protein, fatty acids, and vitamins A and B. Cats show dietary inadequacies in their skin through excess or inadequate oil production, and skin toughening. This results in dandruff, redness, hair loss, greasy skin, and reduced hair growth.

=== Macronutrients ===
The macronutrients – proteins, fats, and carbohydrates – provide energy to the cat. Proteins are also broken down into essential amino acids and fats into essential fatty acids.

The natural feral cat diet has a metabolizable energy (%ME) breakdown of 52% crude protein, 46% crude fat, and 2% nitrogen-free extract (roughly corresponding to carbohydrates). This is calculated from the dry-matter values of 62.7% crude protein, 22.8% ethereal extract (crude fat), and 2.8% NFE. Most commercial diets have carbohydrate %ME in the range of 20%–40%, far exceeding the natural diet. However, because cats digest starch and perform glycolysis slowly, such medium-carbohydrate diets do not actually result in higher postprandial glucose levels, insulin release, and more insulin resistance compared to a natural-like diet. Only with even higher amounts of carbohydrate (48% ME) or faster-to-absorb carhohydrates (glucose instead of starch) are significant effects seen.

==== Arginine ====
Cats are unusually dependent on a constant supply of the amino acid arginine, and a diet lacking arginine causes marked weight loss and can be rapidly fatal. Even a single meal that lacks arginine but contains protein can kill a cat. Arginine is an essential additive in cat food because cats have low levels of the enzymes which are responsible for the synthesis of ornithine and citrulline in the small intestine (specifically, for pyrroline-5-carboxylate production). Citrulline would typically go on to the kidneys to make arginine, but because cats have a deficiency in the enzymes that make it, citrulline is not produced in adequate quantities to make arginine. Arginine is essential in the urea cycle in order to convert the toxic component ammonia into urea that can then be excreted in the urine. Because of its essential role, deficiency in arginine results in a buildup of toxic ammonia and leads to hyperammonemia. The symptoms of hyperammonemia include lethargy, vomiting, ataxia, and hyperesthesia, and can be serious enough to induce death and coma in a matter of days if a cat is being fed an arginine-free diet. These symptoms appear quickly because diets devoid in arginine will typically still contain all of the other amino acids, which will continue to be catabolized by the body, producing mass amounts of ammonia that very quickly build up with no way of being excreted.

==== Essential fatty acids ====
A fatty acid molecule consists of a (COOH) group attached to an aliphatic chain. There are many types of fatty acid with different such chains. These different types have somewhat different properties. Saturated fatty acids have no carbon=carbon double bonds, while polyunsaturated fatty acids have more than one such bond in each molecule. The main form of fatty acids in diet is fats or triglycerides, which consist of three fatty acid groups attached to a glycerin molecule.

Fatty acids can become attached to different molecules such as carbohydrates or proteins, and can implement a wide range of functions in the body. These functions include long-term energy storage, insulation (prevents heat loss, protects vital organs, helps transmit nerve impulses faster), structure, transportation around the body for nutrients and other biological molecules. They can also be precursors to other compounds in the body, such as hormones (some of which are important for gut/immune/overall health). The length, degree of saturation and configuration of a fatty acid affects how it is broken down, absorbed and used in the gastrointestinal tract. Essential fatty acids (EFA) are nutrients that cats are unable to produce in sufficient amounts to meet their needs, or at all. All EFAs are polyunsaturated. EFAs also vary in size, have many different functions and can also be further divided into other categories, two of which are very important for gastrointestinal health: the omega-6 and omega-3 fatty acids. (The omega number denotes the position of the first double bond in a fatty acid, counting from the methyl end.) These fatty acids are most effective when present in adequate and appropriate balanced ratios dependent upon stage of life and production of the animal. Omega-6 fatty acids at high levels can suppress the functions of the immune system (a large part of which is located in the gastrointestinal tract) and promote inflammation, platelet aggregation and hypersensitive reactions like allergies. Omega-3 fatty acids act in the opposite direction to omega-6 fatty acids, by reducing inflammation and depressing aggregation and immunosuppression. The diet provided will determine the ratio of omega-6 to omega-3 fatty acids consumed; the optimal ratio of omega-6 to omega-3 fatty acids is considered to be within the range of 5:1 to 10:1. The right ratio helps reduce inflammation and mediate immune responses, as both types of fatty acid use the same enzymes in their metabolic journey.

Sources of fatty acids
Type	Sources
Omega-6	Corn oil, sunflower oil, soybean oil
Omega-3	Cold-water fish oil, flaxseed, canola oil, soybean oil

There are three essential fatty acids that should be included in a cat's diet: alpha-linolenic acid, linoleic acid, and arachidonic acid. Alpha-linolenic acid is an omega-3 fatty acid that aids in the maintenance of the skin's water barrier. Ingredients that are high in alpha-linolenic acid, such as flaxseed, should be included in the cat's diet. Another source of omega-3s is fish oil. Eicosapentaenoic acid (EPA) and Docosahexaenoic acid (DHA) are omega-3 fatty acids which have anti-inflammatory properties. Linoleic acid cannot be converted by cats and high concentrations of linoleic acid can result in amino acid deficiencies, therefore fish oils are recommended as a supplement for cats instead of vegetable oils, as vegetable oils contain high concentrations of linoleic acid. Arachidonic acid is also essential to cats because they are unable to create it from linoleic acid due to an absence of the Delta 6 desaturase enzyme. It can be found in substances such as animal fat.

==== Fiber ====
The addition of fiber at optimal levels in a diet is essential for the normal function and health of the gastrointestinal tract. Cats are to occasionally consume plant material, mainly leaves, in response to a diet deficient in fiber.

Dietary fibers are plant carbohydrates which cannot be digested by mammalian enzymes. These structural plant carbohydrates include pectin, lignin, cellulose, hemicellulose, muclinage, and gums. Different types of fibers have varying levels of solubility and fermentation; this ranges from pectin which is highly fermentable, to beet pulp which is moderately fermentable, to cellulose which is non-fermentable. Non-fermentable fibers helps with satiety, maintenance of a normal intestinal transit time and gastrointestinal motility as well as increasing diet bulk. Fermentable fibers, on the other hand, are fermented to short-chain fatty acids by bacteria in the colon and have variable effects on gastric emptying. Moderately soluble fibers have been linked to increased colon weight as well as an increased mucosal surface area for absorption of nutrients. (Feral cat diets also include undigestible animal material such as bone, tendon, cartilage, skin, hair and feathers. These so-called "animal fibers" are also fermented.)

Fiber, though it is not an essential nutrient, is important for a healthy gastrointestinal tract. The microbes found in the cat's large intestine have the ability to ferment dietary fibers to short-chain fatty acids. Cells of the gastrointestinal tract are constantly dying and being replaced by new cells, which requires a lot of energy. The fatty acids produced are used as energy sources for these epithelial cells which line the gastrointestinal tract. As a result of the presence of energy from the fatty acids, colonic cell proliferation is increases.

Short-chain fatty acids production from dietary fibers have many other advantageous effects on the gastrointestinal tract. They increase motility by stimulating rhythmic contractions of the distal portion of the small intestine, which potentially decreases fermentation in the small intestine while increasing it in the large intestine for further fatty acid absorption. Blood flow to the colon also increases with the presence of short-chain fatty acids. These fatty acids also increase sodium absorption which helps maintain normal electrolyte and fluid balance in the intestine, reducing the risk for diarrhea . These homeostatic conditions of the intestinal tract promote the growth of beneficial bacteria while inhibiting the proliferation of pathogenic ones. A healthy and balanced gut microbiome is important for maintaining a healthy digestive tract.

Fibers promote bacterial growth and activity in the large intestine. It is essential for a healthy gastrointestinal tract to have a healthy and stable gut microbiota. The microorganisms present in the colon are responsible for the fermentation of the fiber into short-chain fatty acids and for the production of some vitamins.

===== Prebiotics =====
Prebiotics are short-chain carbohydrates classified as fibers with an added aspect as they selectively promote the growth of beneficial bacteria. By promoting the health and proliferation of beneficial bacteria, they suppress the growth of pathogenic ones by outcompeting them. inulin, galactooligosaccharides, lactulose, fructooligosaccharides (FOS) and mannanoligosaccharides (MOS) are all examples of prebiotics.

=== Zinc ===
Zinc's connection to skin and coat health is due to its influence on regulating cellular metabolism. Zinc also supports proper immune function and suitable activity within the inflammatory response. Deficiencies result in disorders of the skin and poor immune functioning. When zinc is supplemented in diets, skin scaliness decreases. Dietary sources include poultry, red meat, and eggs.

=== Copper ===
One of the many functions of copper is to assist in production of connective tissue and the pigment melanin. A deficiency in dietary copper is also related to collagen abnormalities, hypopigmentation of the skin, and alopecia. Sources for cats include liver and supplements in the forms of copper sulphate and cupric oxide.

=== Selenium ===
Selenium works with vitamin E as antioxidants to remove the free radicals that are damaging to the body and the skin. Selenium also plays a role with other antioxidants to help maintain cell membranes which provides further protection from free radicals causing oxidative stress. Oxidative stress plays a role in development of skin diseases. Dietary sources of selenium are naturally occurring in selenomethionine and tuna.

=== Vitamin A ===
Vitamin A is a crucial nutritional component in the maintenance of feline skin and coat health. In addition to its many other functions, vitamin A plays an important role in the keratinization of the skin, hair and nails along with assisting in the development of various epithelial tissues throughout the body. The cells making up the epithelial tissues of the skin, respiratory and gastrointestinal tracts rely on vitamin A to successfully complete the process of mitosis in order preserve these tissues and repair any damages. The mucus-secreting cells of the respiratory and gastrointestinal epithelium also specifically require vitamin A to successfully produce a specialized protein referred to as mucoproteins which aid in maintaining the health of these tissues. Unlike most other mammals, the cat is unique in that they are unable to transform B-carotene to vitamin A and therefore explicitly require active forms of vitamin A which are only found in animal products. This difference in metabolism is due to very low levels of activity of the enzyme B-carotene 15, 15' dioxygenase in feline species. The nutrient profiles developed by AAFCO currently advise a minimum of 3332 IU/kg of vitamin A on a dry matter basis included in adult diets and 6668 IU/kg in the diets of raising kittens as well as pregnant or lactating female cats. Common ingredients which help to incorporate the proper levels of vitamin A into feline diets include various types of liver as well as fish oils.

=== B vitamins ===
==== Niacin (B3) ====
Niacin is an essential vitamin for the cat; dietary deficiency can lead to anorexia, weight loss and an increase in body temperature. Biosynthesis of niacin occurs by metabolism of tryptophan via the kynurenine pathway to quinolinic acid, the niacin precursor. However, cats have a high activity of picolinic acid carboxylase, which converts one of the intermediates to picolinic acid instead of quinolinic acid. As a result, niacin can become deficient and require supplementation.

==== Biotin (B7) ====
Biotin can be provided in feline diets by adding cooked eggs, liver, milk, legumes or nuts. Microorganisms living in the gastrointestinal tracts of cats are also able to synthesize and supply an alternative source of biotin if proper nutritional requirements are met. Its main function in metabolism is as a coenzyme for essential carboxylation reactions throughout the body; however it has also been shown to aid in the management of certain skin diseases in cats. Biotin is recommended by AAFCO to be included in feline diets at a minimum level of 0.07 mg/kg on a dry matter basis throughout all stages of development. It is required only when the cat is taking antimicrobials that kill gut bacteria.

=== Vitamin C ===
Vitamin C (ascorbic acid) is a water-soluble antioxidant and a free radical scavenger where it will donate an electron to compounds with unpaired elections or reactive but not radical compounds. Supplements of Vitamin C reduce oxidative DNA damage in cats prone to kidney injury, and can be beneficial to add into diets for cats with renal diseases. Vitamin C is not essential for cats and it is not required by the Association of American Feed Control Officials (AAFCO); however, it is commonly added into pet foods as an antioxidant. Ascorbic acid is known to function in gene expression as a co-substrate, and have unique biosynthetic pathways in different organisms.

Unlike humans, felines are able to synthesize Vitamin C in the liver via the glucuronate pathway, as they lack glucokinase activity. The simple sugars glucose and galactose are used as input. This pathway naturally maintains ascorbic acid (active Vitamin C) at an adequate level; therefore it does not need to be separately included in their diet.

=== Vitamin D ===
Vitamin D is a dietary requirement for cats as they lack the ability to efficiently synthesize vitamin D3 using sunlight. This fat-soluble vitamin is required in cats for bone formation through the promotion of calcium retention, along with nerve and muscle control through absorption of calcium and phosphorus. Wild cats probably gather vitamin D from prey liver.

Unlike dogs and humans, cats metabolize vitamin D2 and vitamin D3 slightly differently. A dose of Vitamin D2 is approximately 70% as effective as the same amount of vitamin D3.

=== Vitamin E ===
Vitamin E as an antioxidant in gastrointestinal health cat food diets can have a positive effect of improving the animal's immune function and prevent against infections. Vitamin E is a free radical scavenger that functions as a chain-breaking antioxidant to prevent free radical damage of cell membranes. Vitamin E aids in protecting cells from highly reactive oxygen species within the lungs, muscles, skin, brain, tissues and red blood cells. Supplementation of vitamin E in the diet benefits the immune system and improves resistance to infections and diseases.

The National Research Council (NRC) suggested a ratio of vitamin E to polyunsaturated fatty acids be 0.6:1 to ensure enough vitamin E to combat any free radicals. Polyunsaturated fatty acids (PUFA) are prone to oxidative destruction in cellular membranes and increase the requirement for antioxidants.

Vitamin E is an essential nutrient which needs to be included in the feline diet in order to protect the lipid components within cellular membranes of various tissues in the body. Vitamin E is able to accomplish this through working with selenium and acting as an antioxidant to prevent free radicals from interacting with these fatty acid membrane components, resulting in reduced levels of oxidative stress. This is particularly important in the skin as various oxidative environmental components can have very damaging effects if not protected by vitamin E. The nutrient profiles developed by AAFCO currently advise a minimum dry matter inclusion of 40 IU/kg of vitamin E in the diet of cats throughout all stages of development. Lipid metabolism is also a major contributor of free radicals, leading to an increased dietary requirement of vitamin E as the levels of polyunsaturated fatty acids in the diet increase. Ingredients such as wheat germ as well as certain plant oils contain high levels of active vitamin E and are commonly added to feline diets which are carefully stored in order to prevent oxidative destruction of vitamin E prior to consumption.

=== Probiotics ===
Probiotics (live microbes) are becoming increasingly popular in the diets of felines. They are included in the diet to increase the number of bacteria and microbes that are normally present in a healthy gut. Probiotics are considered a supplement rather than part of nutrition. Therefore, there are no strict regulations to the amount of probiotics that should be included in foods.

The function of probiotics goes beyond basic nutrition and has many benefits to the health of the organism. The use of probiotics can help in the prevention and treatment of certain diseases or disorders of felines. Examples include prevention of allergies, diarrhea, symptoms relating to stress, etc. The health of the cats is very much dependent on the fermentation that occurs through gut biota. The gut biota has an important role in the metabolism, absorption, and protective functions of the gastro intestinal tract. Felines have different gut bacteria than canines. However, the most common biota that are found in both felines and canines are Bacillota, Bacteroidota, Pseudomonadota, and Fusobacteriota. Although these are the most common types of gut biota found in felines, there are variances between independent cats. Each cat has their own unique and independent number and type of gut microbes.

=== Antioxidants ===
Nutraceuticals such as antioxidants are considered to be additives of gastrointestinal diets to prevent digestive upset. Antioxidants have the ability to remove free radicals from the body which can cause damage to cell membranes, and are involved in chronic degenerative diseases. Free radicals amplify inflammation by causing release of pro-inflammatory cytokines. Free radicals can be caused by many factors such as stress, disease and age. Some oxygen-derived free radicals can produce ischemia in the small bowel and stomach of cats. Combinations of antioxidants have been reported to improve serum vitamin status, suppress lipid peroxidation and distributes the effects of exercise on the immune system. The most common antioxidants found in cat gastrointestinal diets are vitamin E and vitamin C.

=== Taurine ===
Cats have a sulfinoalanine decarboxylase deficiency, preventing the synthesis of taurine from cysteine. Being able to create their own only in small amounts, dietary taurine is essential for cats. Taurine deficiency in cats will develop into dilated cardiomyopathy, heart failure, blindness, deafness, and reproductive issues. In the 1980s these symptoms were prevalent and linked to a lack of taurine. Commercial cat food was then successfully supplemented with taurine, and this practice continues to this day. Synthetic taurine is typically used for supplementation and found to be effective.

== Food allergy ==
Food allergy is a non-seasonal disease with skin and/or gastrointestinal disorders. The main complaint is excessive scratching (pruritus) which is usually resistant to treatment by steroidal anti-inflammatory drugs. The exact prevalence of food allergy in cats remains unknown. In 20 to 30% of the cases, cats have concurrent allergic diseases (atopy/flea-allergic dermatitis). A reliable diagnosis can only be made with dietary elimination-challenge trials. Allergy testing is necessary for the identification of the causative food component(s). Therapy consists of avoiding the offending food component(s).

== Recalls and contaminants ==
The broad pet food recalls starting in March 2007 came in response to reports of renal failure in pets consuming mostly wet pet foods made with wheat gluten from a single Chinese company beginning in February 2007. Overall, several major companies recalled more than 100 brands of pet foods with most of the recalled product coming from Menu Foods. The most likely cause according to the FDA is the presence of melamine in the wheat gluten of the affected foods. Melamine is known to falsely inflate the protein content rating of substances in laboratory tests. The economic impact on the pet food market was extensive, with Menu Foods alone losing roughly $30 million from the recall. Some companies were not affected and utilized the situation to generate sales for alternative pet foods.

=== Bisphenol A ===
A 2004 study reported that food packaged in cans coated with bisphenol A is correlated with the development of hyperthyroidism in cats.

== Environmental impact ==
The greenhouse gas emissions of animal agriculture are significant, and in the US, 25-30% of those are estimated to come from pet food. While a single cat is smaller than a human, they do eat more animal products on average, offsetting some of their lower food emissions from size and contributing a significant amount to the emissions of a household. Most of the emissions from cats come from the food they eat.

In a study on the impacts of the pet food industry on world fish and seafood supplies, researchers estimate that 2.48 million metric tonnes of fish are used by the cat food industry each year. It was suggested that there needs to be "a more objective and pragmatic approach to the use of a limited and decreasing biological resource, for human benefit." Marine conservation activist Paul Watson argues that the reduction in forage fish such as those commonly used in cat food (sardines, herring, anchovy etc.) negatively affects fish higher up the food chain like cod, tuna and swordfish, not to mention marine mammals and birds.

A study for 2020 in the US found that while a significant portion of cat food is made of animal agriculture by-products, 49.2% of the animal products in conventional cat food are human-consumable. The study also found that if all the world's cats were to eat a plant-based diet, 900 million fewer farmed land animals would be slaughtered each year. Tanya Stephens argues that because vegetarian pet-food is heavily processed and needs to be supplemented with nutrients it is not as sustainable as proponents claim. The increase in popularity of human-grade and byproduct-free pet food means there is increasing pressure on the overall meat supply.

In 2015, there were an estimated 77.8 million dogs and 85.6 million cats in the USA. The consumer desire to feed their pets premium foods which advertise healthy and human-grade ingredients, coupled with more pet ownership, requires more meat; this could require more land for raising livestock. In a study conducted by Okin in 2017, he suggests that if a quarter of all animal protein used in the food of American pets was human-grade, it would be equivalent to the energy needs of 5 million Americans. Okin uses an estimate of 33% of an animal's energy needs is derived from animal products; however, this is conservative in that many diets now have more than 33% of their diet in animal protein alone.

AAFCO recommends 26% crude protein for feline diets on a dry matter basis. High animal protein in cat food has increased in popularity due to consumer demand for natural diets, in which protein content is usually much higher than the AAFCO minimum levels. This trend has led to a higher need for animal protein, which may have a detrimental effect on sustainability.

Lowering protein levels in feline diets may help to improve the sustainability of both the human and pet food system by decreasing pressure on livestock agriculture and ultimately improving environmental effects. Other ways to improve sustainability include using animal byproducts (organs not eaten by humans), plant (mainly pea) proteins, and insect proteins. In addition, feeding less food to an animal helps reduce the carbon footprint and chances of obesity.

== See also ==
- Cat food brands
- Pet food
- Dog food
- Dental health diets for cats
- Pet store
- Senior cat diet
- AAFCO Dog and Cat Food Nutrient Profiles
