= Wing and a Prayer Fife and Drum Corps =

- Origin: Brooklyn, New York, United States
- Genres: Disco, pop
- Years active: 1975–1978
- Labels: Wing and a Prayer; Atlantic
- Past members: Harold Wheeler; Linda November; Vivian Cherry; Arlene Martell; Helen Miles

Wing and a Prayer Fife and Drum Corps was an American disco group in existence from 1975 to 1978. The assemblage of studio musicians (which, contrary to its name, had no fife players) were put together by Harold Wheeler; the group's vocalists were Linda November, Vivian Cherry, Arlene Martell, and Helen Miles.

Their 1976 album, Babyface, hit No. 47 on the US pop album chart and No. 19 on the R&B Albums chart, due to the success of the single, "Baby Face". It had previously reached No. 1 for Jan Garber in 1926 and Art Mooney in 1948. The single went to No. 2 (for two weeks) on the US Club Play chart, No. 6 AC, No. 32 US Billboard R&B Singles, and No. 14 on the Billboard Hot 100. In Canada the song reached No. 8, and was No. 98 in the top 200 of the year. The single also reached No. 12 in the UK Singles Chart, No. 12 in the Dutch Top 40 and number 57 in Australia.

== Discography ==
=== Studio albums ===
List of albums, with selected chart positions
Title	Album details	Peak chart positions	
Title	Album details	US	AUS
Babyface	Released: 1976; Label: Atlantic	47	98
Babyface Strikes Back	Released: 1977; Label: Atlantic	-	-
