= Artie Schroeck =

American musician and composer (born 1938)

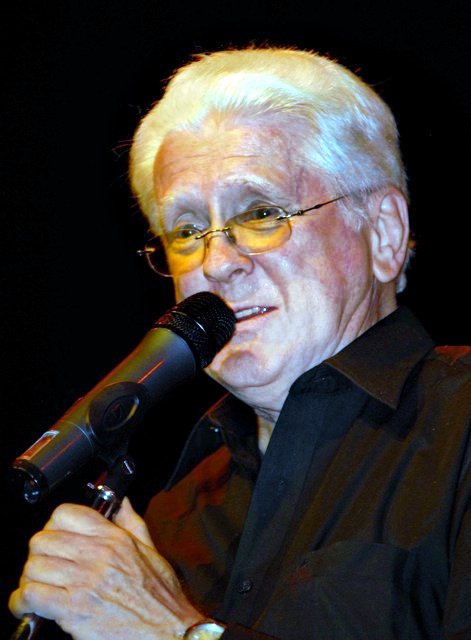
- Artie Schroeck, 2010
- Born: Arthur Bruce Schroeck; October 10, 1938 (age 87); Irvington, New Jersey
- Occupations: Composer and arranger
- Spouse: Linda November

Arthur Bruce Schroeck (born October 10, 1938) is an American musician, best known for arranging and composing popular songs and jingles. He has won multiple Clio Awards, such as when he composed the music for the 1981 ABC-TV promo "Now is the time, ABC is the place". He also composed (with Frank Gari) the 1982 promo "Come on along with ABC". He arranged the classic "Can't Take My Eyes Off You" in 1967 for Frankie Valli and has written or arranged music for multiple other artists including Liza Minnelli, Sammy Davis Jr. and Frank Sinatra. In the 1990s, he was a regular performer at Harrah's in Atlantic City with his wife, singer Linda November, and in 1997, he wrote, arranged, and produced a tribute to bandleader Spike Jones. As of 2011, he continues to perform in Las Vegas.

== Biography ==
Schroeck was born in Irvington, New Jersey, the youngest of four boys: John, William, Harold, and Arthur. The entire family was very musical, and Schroeck began playing drums and piano at the age of 3, soon joining his brother Harold to perform at local functions in the North Jersey area, with the boys singing and tap dancing. When Schroeck was 8, he was noticed by jazz drummer Gene Krupa when the boys were performing in Atlantic City, and Krupa incorporated the boys' work into his own band, as well as that of jazz trumpeter Louis Prima. Harold eventually left the act at the age of 24 to raise his own family, but Artie continued with his music, and also began arranging songs for the bands that he was working with.

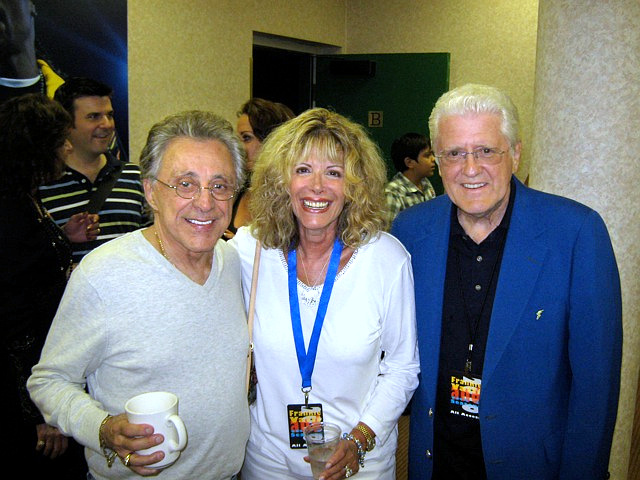
Artie Schroeck (right) with Frankie Valli and Linda November, 2010

In Las Vegas, Schroeck ran into jazz musician Lionel Hampton while they were both in a piano store and they started an impromptu jam session. Hampton immediately invited Schroeck to join his own band, where Schroeck remained for the next two years, before leaving to become a professional music arranger at a recording studio. He worked with Neil Diamond, the Lovin' Spoonful, Paul Anka, and Frankie Valli and the Four Seasons, for whom he arranged "I've Got You Under My Skin" and "Can't Take My Eyes Off You". Schroeck also began writing music at this point in his career, such as 1983's "Here's to the Band" for Frank Sinatra, written with Alfred Nittoli and Sharman Howe.

In the 1980s and '90s, Schroeck could often be found performing in Atlantic City, such as at the Harrah's Atrium Lounge with Linda November. A regular who would come to visit whenever she was in town was Liza Minnelli. Schroeck and November had met in the late 1960s while working together on musical projects, but had both been married to other people at the time. In 1988, they became a couple, and they married in 1996. In 1997, the couple directed a production saluting band leader Spike Jones, "The New City Slickers Present a Tribute to Spike Jones", which Schroeck wrote, arranged, and produced. His brother Harold was also one of the performers in the show, which featured a nine-piece Spike Jones-style band. The show ran from September 26 – October 5, 1997.

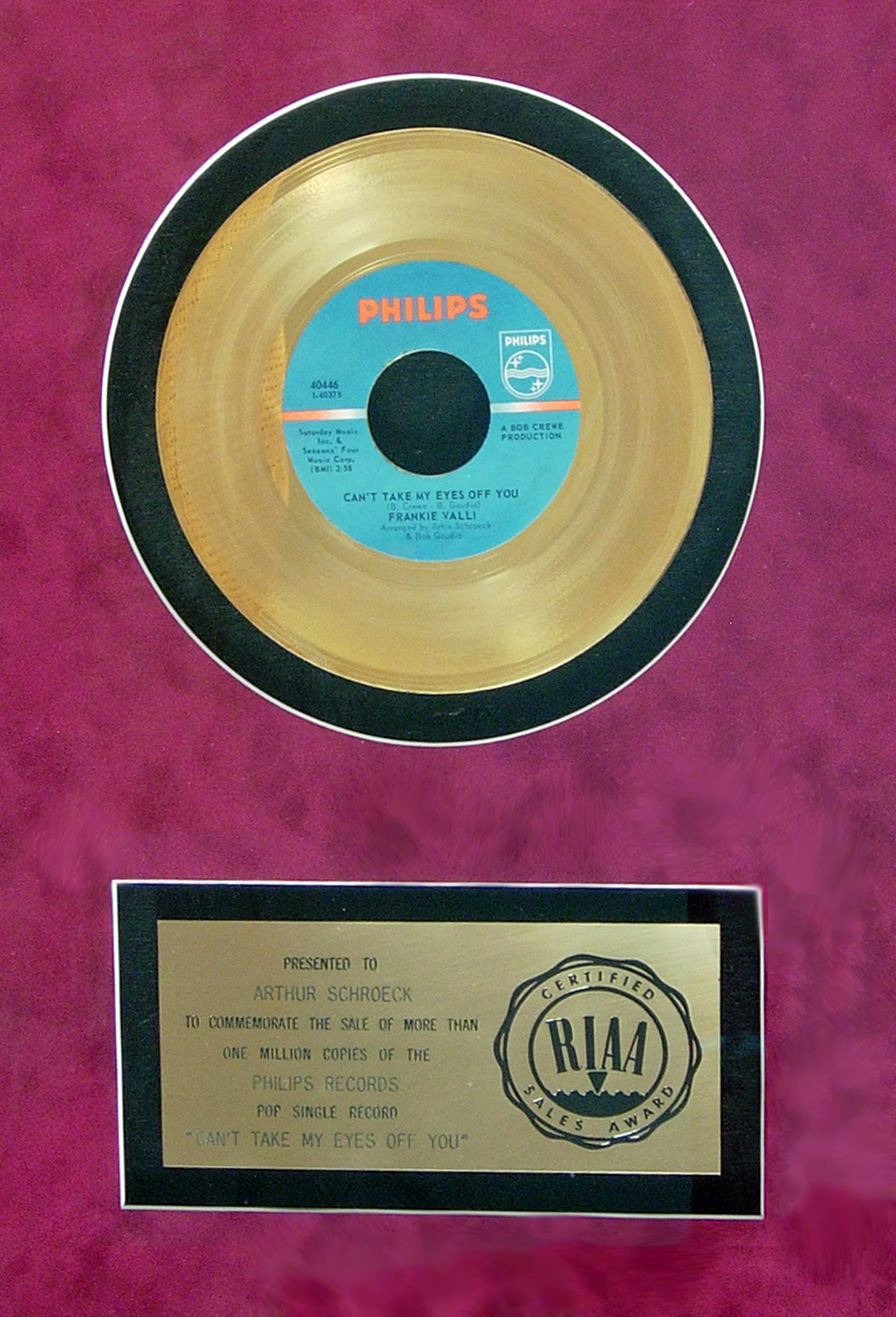
Gold record (for the sale of one million copies) presented to Artie Schroeck for his arrangement on "Can't Take My Eyes Off You", 1967

In 2001, Schroeck and his wife moved to Las Vegas.

Schroeck has three children by a previous marriage. The oldest, Shem Schroeck, is also a musician and singer.

== Selected works ==
- 1966, arranger and conductor, "I've Got You Under My Skin", top 10 hit sung by The Four Seasons
- 1967, co-arranger with Bob Gaudio for gold record "Can't Take My Eyes Off You", sung by Frankie Valli, reached #2 on the U.S. charts
- 1967, arranged "We Can Fly", sung by The Cowsills, reached #21 on the U.S. charts
- 1967, co-wrote "Lovin' Things" with Jet Loring, which was then sung by multiple artists:
  - Scottish band Marmalade released it as a single, which reached #6 on the UK charts in 1968.
  - Keith Mansfield Orchestra, on his 1968 album All You Need Is Keith Mansfield
  - Petula Clark, on her 1969 album Portrait of Petula
  - The Ventures, on their 1969 gold album Hawaii Five-O
  - The Grass Roots, on their 1969 album Lovin' Things

"Let's Do It"
2011 performance of "Let's Do It" by Linda November and Artie Schroeck in Nevada

- 1983, co-writer with Sharman Howe and Alfred Nittoli, "Here's to the Band", sung by Frank Sinatra
- 1992, arranged "Live from Radio City Music Hall" for Liza Minnelli
- 1997, wrote, arranged and produced "The New City Slickers Present a Tribute to Spike Jones" in Atlantic City
- 2005, Artie Schroeck, At the Piano Bar, audio CD

== Awards ==
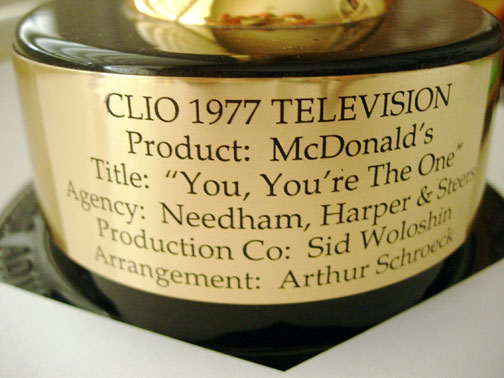
1977 Clio Award for arrangement on McDonald's "You, You're the One" campaign

- 1967, Gold record for arranging "Can't Take My Eyes Off You" for Frankie Valli
- 1970, Pan Am, arranger, "Once in a Lifetime" (Clio Award, Radio)
- 1977, McDonald's, arranger, "You, You're the One" (Clio Award, Television)
- 1982, ABC-TV, composer, "Now is the time ABC is the place" (Clio Award, Television/Cinema)
