= Baby Face (song) =

Popular jazz song written by Harry Akst

Single by Jan Garber
- Released: 1926
- Composer: Harry Akst
- Lyricist: Benny Davis

"Baby Face"

Single by Little Richard

from the album Little Richard
- B-side: "I'll Never Let You Go (Boo Hoo Hoo Hoo)"
- Released: July 1958
- Studio: J&M Studio, New Orleans, Louisiana
- Genre: Rock & Roll
- Label: Specialty
- Producer: Robert "Bumps" Blackwell

Little Richard singles chronology
"Ooh! My Soul" (1958)	"Baby Face" (1958)	"She Knows How to Rock/Early One Morning" (1959)

"Baby Face"

Single by Wing and a Prayer Fife and Drum Corps

from the album Babyface
- B-side: "Baby Face (Special Long Version)"
- Released: October 1975
- Recorded: 1975
- Genre: Disco
- Length: 3:13 (single version); 6:50 (album version)
- Label: Wing and a Prayer Record Label Co.

"Baby Face" is a popular Tin Pan Alley jazz song. The music was written by Harry Akst, with lyrics by Benny Davis, and the song was published in 1926.

The first recording of it was by Jan Garber and his Orchestra, featuring lyricist Benny Davis singing the chorus only. The record was a number one hit in 1926.

The first full version of the song sung on record was released later that same year by Whispering Jack Smith, backed on piano by Arthur Johnston. Smith sang in a half-talking style and started the first verse with "baby cheeks" instead of the familiar "rosy cheeks." He started the second verse with "When you were just a baby, and that's not so long ago."

== Recordings ==
"Baby Face" was performed and recorded by many recording artists of the time, including Al Jolson. It has remained a commonly performed song.

An instrumental version of the song was used in the 1933 film Baby Face starring Barbara Stanwyck.

In 1958, Little Richard peaked at No. 12 on the R&B chart and No. 41 on the pop chart with his version of the song. It also reached No. 2 in the UK in January 1959, becoming Little Richard's highest-charting single in the United Kingdom.

In 1962, American singer Bobby Darin recorded a version as a single. It reached #21 in Canada.

In 1967, a refrain was mixed with the Hallelujah chorus in Thoroughly Modern Millie.

In 1974, in the Paul McCartney and Wings special One Hand Clapping, McCartney performed the song at a piano, a recording of which was released on the 2024 album of the same name. He later sang the song on his 2007 Secret Tour.

In late 1975, disco studio group Wing and a Prayer Fife and Drum Corps recorded a version of the song where it peaked at number two for two weeks on the disco chart. This version also went to No. 32 on the soul chart, No. 6 Easy Listening and No. 14 on the Hot 100 during the winter of 1976. In Canada the song reached No. 8, and was No. 98 in the top 200 of the year. In the UK Singles Chart, it peaked at No. 12, in February 1976, spending 7 weeks within the Top 50.

On December 31, 1976, bandleader Guy Lombardo and the Royal Canadians kicked off their New Year's Eve concert (a tradition since 1929), with an instrumental performance of the song on CBS television. The concert was Lombardo's last before his death on November 5, 1977. The Royal Canadians New Year's specials would end on the network in 1978.

In 1978, actress-singer Cheryl Ladd performed the song as a song-and-dance number on the "General Electric All Star Anniversary" TV show, aired by American Broadcasting Company on September 29, 1978.

Swan Districts, an Australian Rules club in the WAFL, bases its club song on this tune.

A version done by the Muppet Chickens appears on The Muppet Show 2 album. The first singing of it was done with a simple beat in the background, then the rest of the song is sung with more rock-oriented background music. This version was also performed by Muppet performers Richard Hunt, Jerry Nelson, Frank Oz, Dave Goelz, Steve Whitmire, and Kevin Clash, in character as the chickens, at Jim Henson's memorial service in 1990 during a segment where they performed Henson's favorite songs.

Other major recordings of the song have been (listed alphabetically) by:

- Julie Andrews (1967)
- Beau-Marks (1960)
- James Booker
- Eddie Cantor
- Vikki Carr (1965)
- Jo Ann Castle (1964)
- The Crew-Cuts (1960)
- Bing Crosby
- Dave Edmunds (1999)
- Tiny Hill
- Brian Hyland (1960)
- The Kinks (1972)
- Sammy Kaye (1948)
- Brenda Lee (1959)
- Mitch Miller
- Sal Mineo (1958)
- David Dundas (1977)
- The Muppets (1978)
- Marie Osmond
- Elis Regina
- The Revelers
- Roberta Sherwood (1957 and 1963)
- Sharon, Lois & Bram (1990)
- Jack Smith (1948)
- Whispering Jack Smith (1926)
- Tiny Tim (1987)
- Vampire Rodents
- Billy Vaughan
- Bobby Vee (1961)
- Little Richard

== In popular culture ==
In 1937, Darla Hood performed the song in the Our Gang comedy Reunion in Rhythm.

In 1976, the Brady family performed the song for the opening number for the pilot episode of The Brady Bunch Variety Hour.

Then 85 year old Mae West performed a rendition in the 1978 film Sextette.

A parody, retitled "Baby Pants", was used in a Luvs diapers TV commercial in the 1980s.
