= Senior cat diet =

Cat food for elderly cats

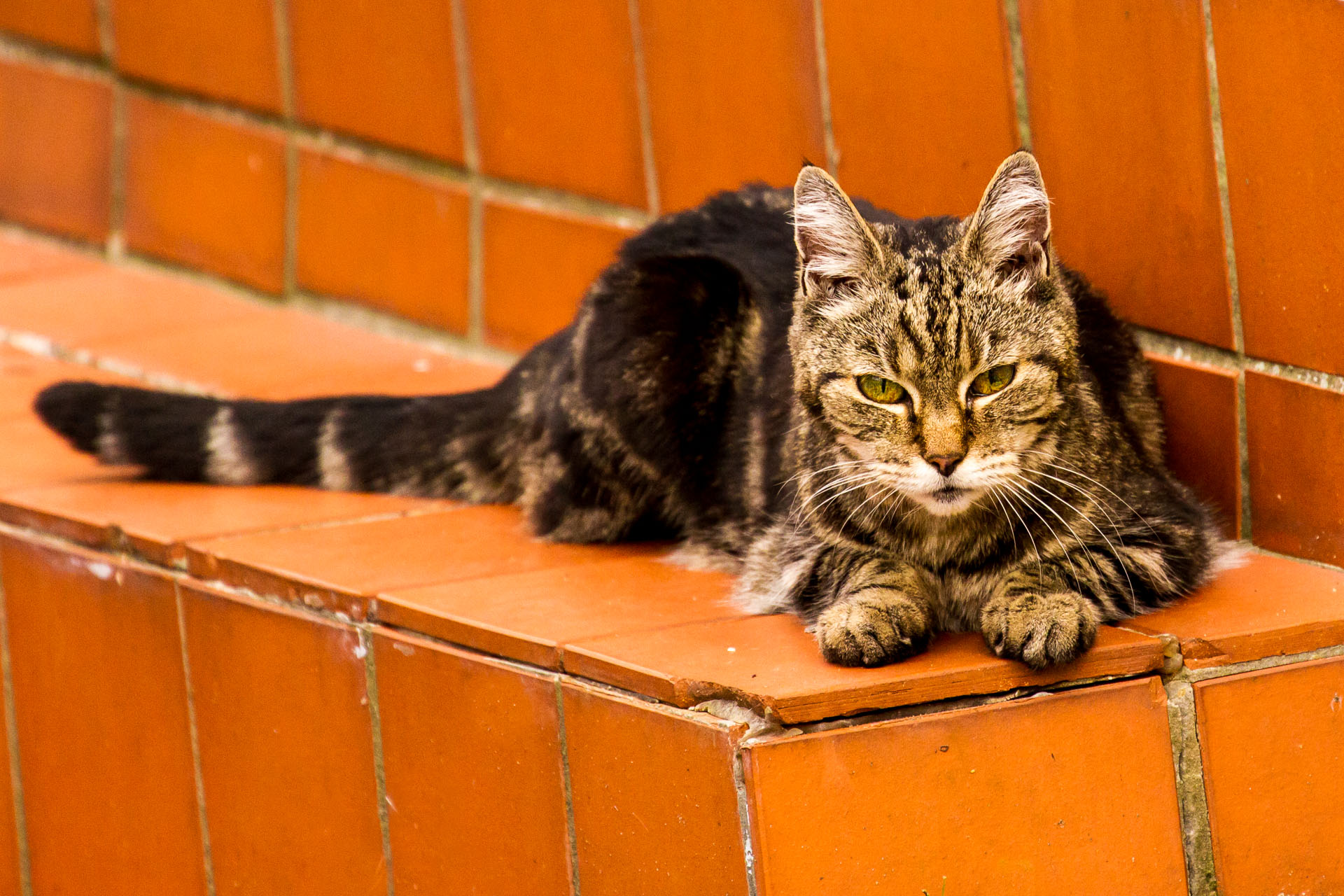
A senior tabby cat

A senior cat diet is generally considered to be a diet for cats that are mature (7–10 years old), senior (11–15 years old), or geriatric (over 15 years old). Nutritional considerations arise when choosing an appropriate diet for a healthy senior cat. Dietary management of many conditions becomes more important in senior cats because changes in their physiology and metabolism may alter how their system responds to medications and treatments.

== Energy and macronutrient requirements ==
Diets should be managed for each individual cat to ensure that they maintain an ideal body and muscle condition. Unlike many other species, the energy requirements for cats do not decrease with age, but may even increase, therefore seniors require the same or more energy than adults. Scientific studies have indicated that after 12 years of age, and again after 13 years of age, energy requirements for cats increase significantly. Obesity is common in adult cats, but much less so in senior cats. Of all feline life stages it has been demonstrated that senior cats are the most often underweight. Research has shown that fat and protein digestibility decrease with age in cats, causing seniors to have a higher dietary requirement for these macronutrients. The fat and protein sources need to be highly digestible to maximize energy capture from the food. This may help to explain the body condition differences between adult and senior cats given the consistency of food intake.

There is little research on the reasons for decreased fat and protein digestibility, however some speculations have been made based on age-related changes observed in other species. Decreased secretion of digestive enzymes may be related to decreased digestive function in humans and rats, however more research into this is required to explain this in cats. Vitamin B12 is important in methionine synthesis, DNA synthesis, and is a vital part of an enzyme important for metabolic pathways. Lower nutrient digestibility may be due to gastrointestinal disease, including pancreatic and intestinal disease, which are often found with low levels of vitamin B12. One study has shown that fat digestibility in senior cats could be reduced by as much as 9% when associated with B12 deficiency and pancreatic disease.

Due to this lower digestibility seen in seniors, it is important to look at metabolizable energy values, which provide a more accurate assessment of nutrient availability than a gross energy calculation. The metabolizable energy of food is determined by the Atwater system and calculates the amount of energy available to the animal after digestion and absorption. A gross energy calculation may overestimate digested energy, as it provides the total available energy in the food rather than what is actually being utilized by the cat.

== Age-related disorders and dietary considerations ==
Senior cats are often prone to arthritis, periodontal disease, and a decline in cognitive and sensory function.

What an owner may perceive as a normal age-related change could actually be subtle signs of arthritis, such as increased inactivity and reluctance to perform normal activities, such as stair climbing and descent. Arthritis has been found in approximately 80-90% of senior cats showing little or no lameness; in many cases this is not a result of damage to the joints but natural degeneration specific to cats. Cats that suffer from arthritis have been shown in some studies to display significant signs of improvement when chondroprotectants, substances which help maintain the integrity of connective tissue, are added to the diet. Evidence for antioxidants (vitamin C and E, and beta-carotene), omega-3 fatty acids such as eicosapentaenoic acid (f) and docosahexaenoic acid (DHA) for inflammation, L‑carnitine and lysine has been shown to be beneficial in other species.

Cognitive decline similar to that seen in humans and dogs has been observed in senior cats, with ongoing research into the causes and treatment. Changes in the structure of the brain, including those similar to the causes of Alzheimer's disease in humans, are considered to be a significant factor in cognitive issues in cats. Studies in other species have shown that supplementing dietary omega-3 and -6 fatty acids, particularly EPA, DHA, and arachidonic acid, along with antioxidants such as beta-carotene and vitamin B12, may aid in the prevention of decline of cognitive function, and slow the progression of symptoms.

Senior cats tend to become particularly picky with their food as a reduced ability to taste and smell is associated with age, therefore, palatability is an important factor to consider. Cats have shown a preference in studies for diets with a higher protein content regardless of the flavouring of the food. Additionally, cats are unable to effectively regulate their water intake, and seniors are particularly prone to dehydration. Wet diets should be considered to increase water intake and enhance palatability, as well as to alleviate discomfort associated with periodontal disease, a common concern with senior cats. Dry dental kibble could be considered to help prevent plaque buildup on teeth, however as this has only been shown to be effective as the sole diet, brushing of the teeth or dental chews would be a better alternative in combination with a canned food in order to optimize water intake, palatability and dental health.

== Holistic guidance ==
As they do not digest as much energy per meal as an adult cat, it is important to feed senior cats smaller, more frequent meals of a highly digestible diet throughout the day. It is also important to monitor the cat's health closely, with regular visits to the veterinarian, as they are very good at hiding symptoms of disease. By carefully selecting a diet that considers a senior cat's changing needs, such as digestion, mobility, cognition, dental health and body condition, it may be possible to manage, or even prevent the progression of many of these age associated conditions.
