= Dental health diets for cats =

A tortie cat cat with her mouth slightly open to reveal her snaggletooth.

Oral health can be difficult for pet owners and veterinary teams to manage in cats, particularly for pets whose owners are not committed to regular tooth brushing and/or dental treats. Oral disease is common among cats, and may lead to other health issues such as bacterial infections of major organs including the heart, kidneys and liver. When pet owners are aware of the benefits of supporting good oral health in cats, this substantially improves positive outcomes. Dietary selection, along with at-home-dental-hygiene care, allows cat owners to influence the oral status of their pets.

Feline dental health diets are pet foods designed to prevent oral diseases in cats. Many commercial and prescription pet food manufacturers offer dental specific diets aimed to improve the oral health of adult domestic cats.

== On overall feline health ==
Managing oral health is important for maintaining optimum health status in cats. Periodontal diseases are prevalent in cats of all ages and have the potential to further develop into local and/or systemic diseases. If oral hygiene is not supported and periodontal disease develops, the overall health of the animal is affected.

Oral disease is not a new problem for cats. A 2014 study examined the skulls of cats that died before 1960 and discovered the same feline dental diseases found in modern times. This highlights that felines are predisposed to poor oral health, a trait which is likely due to their origins as a desert species and the typical diet they consume. Purebred cats are not at a higher risk of developing oral diseases when compared to mixed breeds. This further supports the supposition that the lifestyle of the cat plays the largest role on dental health.

== Specific dietary nutrients ==
There are key nutrients to look for on the food label of dental diets which support dental health. These ingredients focus on preventing tartar, plaque, and bacterial growth in the mouth.

Zinc is an essential trace mineral that is often added to diets for its antibacterial properties. It has also been proven to reduce plaque in cats. In association with this, bad breath, also known as halitosis, is reduced. It is commonly found in feline diets as zinc ascorbate, zinc gluconate, zinc oxide, or as other types of zinc salts. A cat may absorb anywhere between ten and twenty-five percent of the dietary zinc they consume. Depending on other nutrient levels present, the absorption of zinc in the cat's body may be anywhere within this range. In particular, calcium and phytate are known to decrease zinc absorption. Alternatively, feeding zinc to cats in high concentrations can cause toxicity symptoms such as vomiting, abdominal pain, and a lack of appetite.

Polyphosphates can be used to coat the kibbles of both dog and cat dental diets. These compounds are effective at binding to minerals, in particular calcium, which would otherwise bind to plaque and harden to form tartar. In particular, sodium hexametaphosphate has been shown to effectively decrease tartar buildup on teeth. It is able to do this by binding to the calcium component found in tartar. Kibbles coated with this compound have been proven to prevent the formation of tartar on all teeth, and not just those involved in the mechanical breakdown of food (mainly the molars).

Ascorbic acid, also known as vitamin C, is a useful ingredient for cats whose mouth and gums are already diseased. It is usually added to the coating of kibbles in the form of ascorbyl phosphate. Ascorbic acid is an effective antiseptic used to heal mouth sores and reduce inflammation. These results were determined by visual assessments and bacterial cultures.

== Diet physical properties ==
Diet selection is important for feline dental health. Cats fed a dry food diet have a better oral health status regarding the presence of dental diseases and tartar accumulation when compared to cats fed a wet food diet. Similarly, when cats are fed only or partially dry commercially prepared cat food as part of their feeding program, there is a reduction in tartar and gingival disease when compared to cats fed home prepared diets. Advantages of a dry diet are due to the abrasive properties, such as the patterning or texture of the kibble, which mechanically scrape teeth and aid in the removal of plaque buildup. The addition of dietary fibre present in high levels is effective in achieving this texture and is useful in promoting chewing in order to increase contact with teeth. The positive effects of a kibble on feline dental health are achieved in dry pet food formulations and are not exclusive to diets which focus on dental health.

Kibble size is also an important factor when creating a dental diet. By increasing kibble size, tartar can be significantly decreased. This reduction in tartar correlates to the increased need to chew as kibble size increases.

Homemade raw diets that include the feeding of meaty, raw bones to mechanically break down plaque and tartar have proven to be more of a risk than benefit. In addition to risking spoilage due to microbial and bacterial growth, fracturing of teeth is also common.

== The Veterinary Oral Health Council ==
When looking for dental diets and treats for cats, the Veterinary Oral Health Council (VOHC) is a useful indicator to determine the efficacy of a product. Run by the American Veterinary Dental College, this council exists to validate dental health claims, such as the reduction of tartar and/or plaque, made by food and treat manufacturers. They recognize and provide credit to companies who have done their due diligence in ensuring the clinical efficacy of their product. The VOHC do not perform their own testing, but instead review research provided by pet food companies who must follow regulations and protocols that they have established, in addition to undergoing a rigorous approval process. The VOHC seal of approval can be found on products in both veterinary clinics and retail stores.

== Advocating for feline oral health ==
To promote oral health of felines, a dental diet is one place to start. Diets with key nutrients such as zinc, polyphosphates, and ascorbic acid, can aid in the prevention of dental disease and the reduction of plaque and tartar accumulation. Aside from diet composition, large kibble size is a factor for consideration when purchasing a commercial diet. Additionally, looking for the Veterinary Oral Health Council seal is a way to identify products which meet standardized protocols that help consumers purchase products that have been proven to be effective.
