= Raw feeding =

Practice of feeding animals uncooked meat, bones, and organs

Raw feeding is the practice of feeding domestic dogs, cats, and other animals a diet consisting primarily of uncooked meat, edible bones, and organs. The ingredients used to formulate raw diets vary. Some pet owners choose to make home-made raw diets to feed their animals but commercial raw diets are also available.

The practice of feeding raw diets has raised some concerns due to the risk of foodborne illnesses, zoonosis, and nutritional imbalances. People who feed their dogs raw food do so for a multitude of reasons, including but not limited to: culture, beliefs surrounding health, nutrition, and what is perceived to be more natural for their pets. Feeding raw food can be perceived as allowing the pet to stay in touch with their wild, carnivorous ancestry. The raw food movement has occurred in parallel with the change in human food trends for more natural and organic products.

Despite beliefs in better health outcomes there is no evidence raw feeding provides any health benefit compared to conventional diets. Raw diets may be nutritionally incomplete or have harmful parasites and bacteria. Feeding bones can lead to tooth damage or gastrointestinal blockage and perforation.

== Health claims ==
=== Bone and dental health ===
Uncooked, non-weight bearing bones are often recommended in raw diets because of the belief that bone would be the primary source of calcium and phosphorus for canines in the wild. However, phosphorus is available in many food sources. Finding foods that provide sufficient amounts of calcium to maintain a good ratio is challenging, as many foods that are high in calcium are also high in phosphorus. For this reason, creating a homemade raw diet with an appropriate calcium:phosphorus ratio may prove difficult, especially without the analysis techniques that are available to commercial food producers.

Consumption of bones may cause oral and dental trauma and or create an obstruction in the oesophagus or gastrointestinal intestinal tract. Bones also have the potential to cause perforation.

=== Skin and coat health ===
Many raw diets focus on promoting a healthy skin and coat, mainly through the supplementation of essential fatty acids. Fatty acids play an important role in the structure and function of cells, while also improving palatability of the diet. Omega-6 (n-6) and omega-3 (n-3) are especially important for normal skin function and appearance. The skin's ability to produce long chain fatty acids, such as linoleic acid (18:2n-6) and linolenic acid (18:2n-3) is limited. For this reason, these fatty acids are especially essential for skin health and many raw diets make sure they are properly supplemented.

To improve skin and coat health, essential fatty acids are supplied in excess of the Association of American Feed Control Officials (AAFCO) requirements, which results in improved coat sheen and skin health. Omega-6 fatty acids, linoleic acid in particular, play an important role in skin barrier function. Omega-3 fatty acids also plays an important role in skin health as they help reduce inflammation and can even protect against UV damage.

Fatty acids supplemented into raw food diets often are seen in a variety of forms. Common sources of omega-6 fatty acids in raw diets often include flaxseed, pumpkin and sunflower seeds. All these ingredients can be fed as whole seeds or as oils.

=== Protein availability ===
When commercial pet food is made, ingredients in the food are exposed to high temperatures, creating a risk of maillard reaction. Maillard reactions are problematic as when this reaction occurs, a reducing sugar binds to the amino group on the amino acids, making the amino acids unavailable to the animal. The amino acid most affected by this reaction is lysine, which is an essential amino acid and the first limiting amino acid for dogs, cats and most other vertebrates. Lysine plays a major role in the body including in protein synthesis, as well as carnitine synthesis and obligatory oxidation. Thus, some forms of food processing may reduce the amount of available essential nutrient in a dog's food.

== Types ==
There are various differences in opinion within the raw feeding community. Issues include whether dogs are omnivores or carnivores, whether dogs need plant material in their diet and if so, in what quantities. The safety of whole bones use is also a frequent topic of discussion. Raw diet recipes can range from meat with a wide selection vegetables and grains, while other are more minimalist, using only meat, bones, organ meat, and necessary supplements. An example of a minimalist approach to raw feeding is the Meat with Bone diet advocated by Michelle T. Bernard. Critiques of raw diets include the concern with the possible nutrient imbalances that can arise feeding any type of raw diet.

=== BARF ===
BARF stands for either bones and raw food or biologically appropriate raw food.

=== Prey model diet ===
The "prey model" diet attempts to create a diet that simulates the proportions of ingredients and nutrients seen in a prey animal's diet. In the wild, a predator gains nutrients not only from the meat and organs of the prey they are eating. A wild animal would also gain nutrients from the food their prey has previously consumed. This diet aims to simulate all the nutrients that the wild animal would obtain.

Actual whole prey are used whenever possible, including whole rabbits, chickens, game hens and turkeys. Generally, the diet recommends 80% meat (including some 'meaty' organs such as heart), 10% bone and 10% organs (of which half is liver). Proponents of the whole prey model diet believe dogs and cats are natural carnivores and do not have any nutritional needs besides what is found in meat, bones, and organs. The supporters of the prey model also focus on feeding meats from a wide variety of animals. Some also add small amounts of vegetable matter to simulate the consumption of stomach contents of prey animals.

Supplements are generally not used in a prey model diet although some followers do add fish oil to the diet to compensate for the reduced amount of omega-3 fatty acid in commercially raised grain-fed livestock. This problem can be partially mitigated by using grass-fed meat, which has more than double the omega-3 content as grain-fed meat.

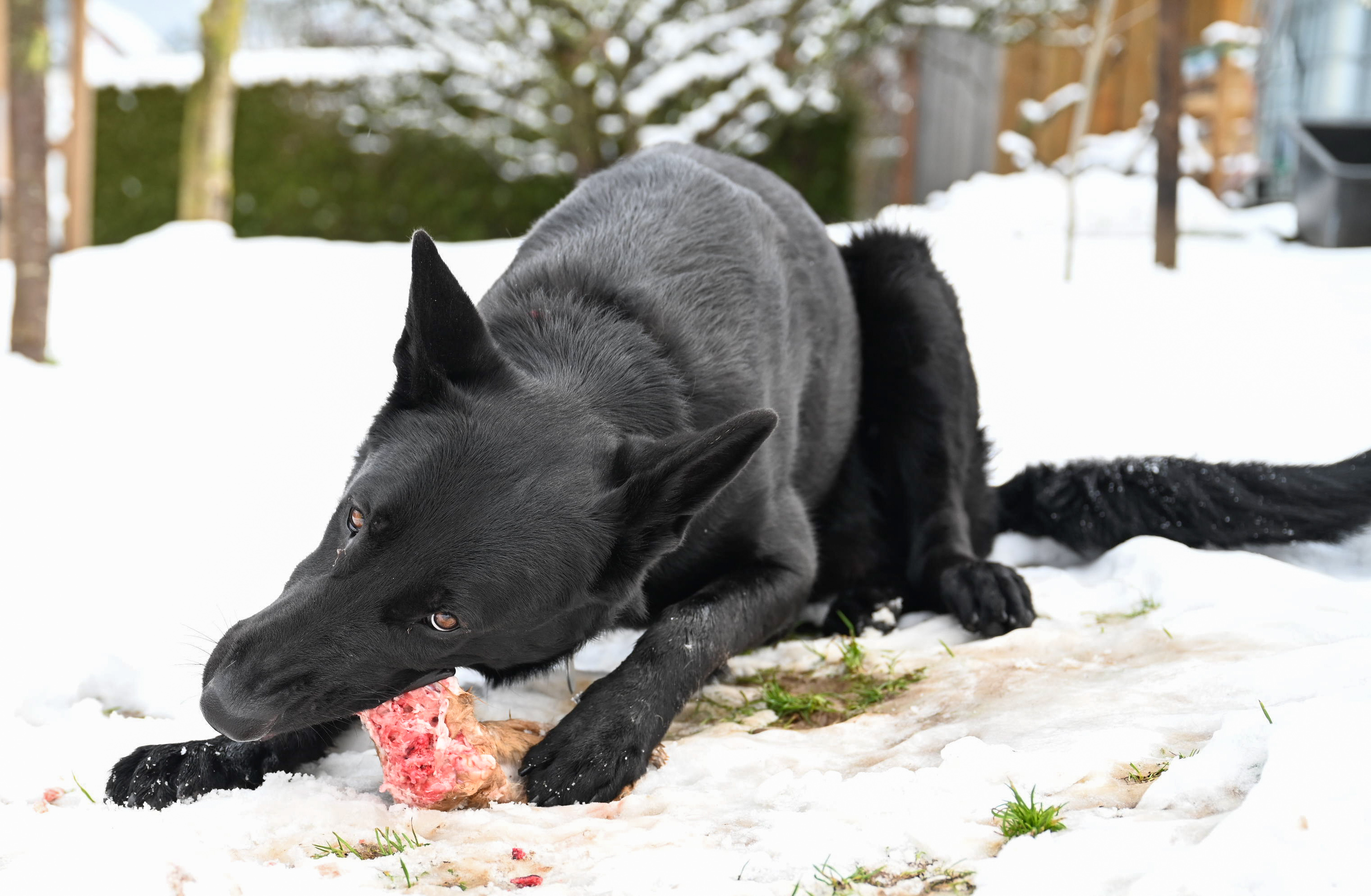
German Shepherd eating a whole rabbit

== Preparation ==
=== At home ===
At home preparation of raw food diets entails the use of wholesome ingredients that can be easily accessed by the owner. The main critique of homemade raw diet is that they are often formulated based on opinion rather than scientific research. Preparing of raw diets can be time-consuming and requires the handling of raw meat.

Examples of homemade diet theories include: BARF, the Ultimate Diet and the Volhard Diet. Included ingredients are supposed to mimic the diet an animal would eat in the wild such as meat, organ meats, bones, and vegetables. Supplementation of vitamins, minerals, essential fatty acids, and probiotics are often included to provide the animal with a complete diet or to offer a variety of benefits to the animal.

In most homemade diets for dogs, a variety of ingredients are included which may include:

- Fresh raw meat (mostly lean meat with the exception of pork for some dogs, beef is the most commonly used)
- Vegetables such as squash, pumpkin, leafy greens, carrots, parsley, etc.
- Offal such as liver
- Fruits such as apples, cranberries, blueberries, etc.
- Stocks, soups, milk or water for added moisture
- Some cereal grains such as barley, flax, etc.
- Some supplements
- For dogs: uncooked bones in the diet or allowing the animal to play with raw bones as a treat

Pet owners are advised to keep in mind that homemade diets can be hard to balance properly and can be associated with poor nutrition. Proper research and understanding of what nutrients the homemade diet offers is crucial. It is also important to recognize the nutritional needs of the animal, which can change given factors such as life stages, breed and overall health.

=== Commercial ===
Interest in homemade pet food (both cooked and raw) grew tremendously. As a result, several pet food manufacturers now offer frozen raw diet products for pet owners. The commercial raw pet food market is estimated to be worth $169 million a year, less than 1% of total pet food sales figure in North America ($18 billion). Growth is estimated at 23% per annum.

Many consumers prefer raw commercial diets over raw homemade diets due to its convenience. Most commercial diets are formulated to meet the requirements of AAFCO Dog or Cat Food Nutrient Profiles. The diets are formulated with the intent to satisfy values needed for the different life stages whether that be adult maintenance, growth, gestation or lactation. Some raw products are meant to be used as supplemental feeding only as they are not nutritionally complete or balanced. Raw commercial diets are usually pre-packaged and can be fresh, frozen or freeze-dried.

Many commercially sold raw food diets are treated by High Pressure Pasteurization (HPP). HPP sterilizes the food from pathogenic bacteria and extends the shelf life of the product. During HPP, the food is placed in a water-filled chamber and intense pressure is applied. High pressure pasteurization is a USDA-approved food processing technique. Although this method helps kill most bacteria, HPP cannot destroy all pathogens.

The Food and Drug Administration (FDA) has released a document that gives guidance for the raw pet food industry on preparation, labelling, storage and transport.

=== Supplements ===
When feeding raw diets, considering adding supplements to the animal's diet may be very beneficial. Supplements aid in providing the animal with a high quality, complete and optimal diet. Supplements may also be useful in improving an animal's health, especially when that animal has specific health issues. Some raw dog diets have been found to be low in the nutrients vitamin E, zinc, and iodine, which can be remedied by supplementation. There are a variety of supplements that can be given to an animal and getting the opinion of a veterinarian or an animal nutritionist may be helpful.

Example of vitamin supplements:

- Vitamin E is an antioxidant that is not present in raw meat. It is acquired from plants. Providing vitamin E supplementation may benefit the dog as it is theorized to reduce inflammation and help aging dogs with brain cognition.

Example of fatty acid supplements:

- Fish oil supplements contain omega-3 and omega-6 fatty acids. Omega-3 fatty acids are anti-inflammatory and may help improve the coat condition and reduce intestinal inflammation.

Examples of mineral supplements:

- Zinc
- Kelp supplements are given to increase dietary iodine. Iodine is essential in the production of thyroid hormones.

Example of probiotics supplements:

- FortiFlora is a commercially available supplement that aids in decreasing gastrointestinal problems, in addition to supporting immune health.

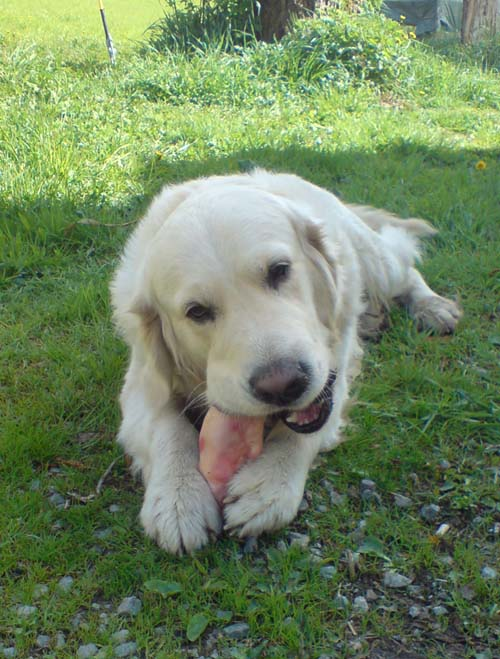
A golden retriever eating a raw pig's foot

== Nutritional balance ==
The nutritional adequacy of a raw food diet varies based on the diet itself. A study looking at two commercial raw food diets found both failed to meet AAFCO guidelines. Cases of health issues arising from raw food diets have been reported in the literature with many bacterial outbreaks attributed to raw feeding.

=== Deficiency problems ===
According to a study on homemade raw diets, very few owners follow a recipe, and this results in a risk of nutritional imbalance.

In terms of vitamins, the presence of avidin in raw eggs can bind to biotin and make it unavailable for absorption which can lead to a deficiency. Raw fish has high level of thiaminase activity that can breakdown thiamine and lead to a deficiency. Liver, often used in raw diets, is rich in vitamin A. High amounts of liver can cause vitamin A toxicity, called hypervitaminosis A.

The Association of American Feed Control Officials (AAFCO) provides standards that guides many commercial pet food companies. This level of supervision does not occur with homemade food and this can predispose them to a variety of deficiencies and imbalances. One study analyzed the nutritional content of three homemade diets (BARF, Ultimate and Volhard) and two commercial raw food diets (Steve's Real Food and Sojourner Farms) and compared it to the AAFCO standards, showing nutritional imbalances in the homemade diets. Three of the diets had inadequate calcium-to-phosphorus ratios, which may lead to hyperparathyroidism and fibrous osteodystrophy in puppies. As well, homemade diets were proven to have deficiencies in vitamin D, important for bone health by facilitating calcium absorption in the gut, which contribute to storage in bone, and vitamin E, which improves overall immune function by reducing oxidative stress. Oxidative stress happens when free radical formation, which is a natural process, excess the body's ability to destroy them, resulting in cellular damage and inflammation. Antioxidants improve the destruction process by scavenging the free radicals. Many macro-minerals were also undersupplied such as, Zinc, Potassium and Sodium in the homemade puppy diet. Another study analyzed 95 homemade BARF diets and found that 60% of these diets had an imbalance in either one, or a combination of calcium, phosphorus, vitamin D, iodine, zinc, copper, and vitamin A.

Another issue with raw diets is the non-inclusion of carbohydrate sources, due to the common misconception that dogs cannot digest starch. According to a paper published in Nature, dogs have acquired the ability to digest starch and it can be used as a readily available energy source. Furthermore, the inclusion of dietary fiber sources is important for a dog's gastrointestinal health and stool quality. The moderately fermentable fibers will form a gel in water and have a lower transit time in the intestines, which will give the microbiota more time to ferment the fiber into short chain fatty acids, used by the enterocyte as energy. The net result of this will be a healthier villi which will maximize absorption.

Some proponents of raw diets recommend consultation with a veterinarian or animal nutritionist to verify that proper nutrients are being ingested, others dismiss the importance of AAFCO standards, claiming that AAFCO certification is not indicative of the quality of a diet.

== Food safety ==
While the intense heat used in manufacturing pet food or cooking meat destroys any potential bacteria, raw meats may contain bacteria that can be unsafe for both dogs and cats. The United States government reported that in 2006, 16.3% of all chickens were contaminated with Salmonella. A study on 25 commercial raw diets for dogs and cats detected Salmonella in 20% and Escherichia coli in 64% of the diets. However, the E. coli strain that can cause severe illness O157:H7 was not tested. An example of the severity of E. coli O157:H7 infections can be seen in affected greyhound racing dogs fed raw meat as part of their diet. Known as "Alabama rot", this disease presents as severe vasculitis, cutaneous necrosis, renal failure and death. A contributing factor might be that racing greyhounds are typically fed raw meat classified as "not for human consumption", which may contain higher than normal levels of bacteria.

Another study assessed the bacterial load in various types of dog food by analyzing 240 samples from raw meat dog diets, commercial dry dog food, or commercial canned food. Salmonella enterica was found in almost 6% of the raw diets, while Escherichia coli was found in almost 50% of the raw diets. E. coli was also found in the commercial dry and wet dog foods, but in lesser amounts. This study determined that bacterial contamination is more common in raw meat diets than commercial dry or canned foods.

There has been a reported case where two cats fed a raw diet developed salmonellosis and died as a result. Most dogs that carry Salmonella are asymptomatic.

Proliferation of bacteria in any meat can be reduced by following proper food safety practices such as defrosting meat in the refrigerator or by cooking raw meat, both of which reduce the risk of pathogens.

Raw meats may also contain harmful parasites. As with bacteria, these parasites are destroyed during the heat processing of cooking meat or manufacturing pet foods. Some raw diet recipes call for freezing meat before serving it, which greatly reduces (but does not necessarily eliminate) extant parasites. According to a former European Union directive, freezing fish at −20 °C (−4 °F) for 24 hours kills parasites. The U.S. Food and Drug Administration (FDA) recommends freezing at −35 °C (−31 °F) for 15 hours, or at −20 °C (−4 °F) for 7 days. The most common parasites in fish are roundworms from the family Anisakidae and fish tapeworm. While freezing pork at −15 °C (5 °F) for 20−days will kill any Trichinella spiralis worm, trichinosis is rare in countries with well established meat inspection programs, with cases of trichinosis in humans in the United States mostly coming from consumption of raw or undercooked wild game. Trichinella species in wildlife are resistant to freezing. In dogs and cats symptoms of trichinellosis would include mild gastrointestinal upset (vomiting and diarrhea) and in rare cases, muscle pain and muscle stiffness.

A survey of accredited zoos worldwide showed a slightly increased risk of parasites and diseases in animals that are carcass fed as compared to commercial food fed. However, the researchers suggested that that may be caused by increased opportunistic preying and infected live preys may be the source of contamination.

There are some myths associated with raw pet food, like that it is more likely to contain salmonella than meat found in grocery stores. Human grade raw pet food (meaning all ingredients are human edible) is produced under USDA inspection and is no more likely to contain bacteria like salmonella than the meat consumed by humans found in local grocery stores.

=== Zoonotic risk ===
A possible risk of raw feeding is that of human infection caused by direct or indirect exposure to bacterial pathogens in raw meat and animal stools. A small study investigated the levels of Salmonella in the stool of 10 dogs that ate a raw diet. It was found that 80% of the raw diets tested positive for Salmonella and 30% of the stool samples from dogs fed raw food contained Salmonella. None of the control dogs fed a commercial feed contained Salmonella. The authors of the study concluded that dogs on a raw food diet may be a source of environmental contamination, although they caution about the generalizability of their results due to the small number of dogs studied. Cats being fed raw meat can also increase the risk of toxoplasmosis as well as other foodborne illnesses.

As a result of the potential animal and human health risks, some agencies assert that the risks inherent in raw feeding outweigh the purported benefits. Despite such concerns, there is no known incidence of humans being infected with Salmonella by cats and dogs fed a raw diet. There have been isolated cases of humans contracting Salmonella from household pets, but it is undetermined whether raw food was the cause. The FDA recommends cleaning and disinfecting all surfaces that come in contact with raw meat, as well as thorough hand washing to reduce the risk of infection.

== Veterinary position ==
Veterinary associations such as the American Veterinary Medical Association, British Veterinary Association and Canadian Veterinary Medical Association have warned of the animal and public health risk that could arise from feeding raw meat to pets and have stated that there is no scientific evidence to support the claimed benefits of raw feeding.

Veterinary associations often organize debates and panels to further the understanding of health and nutrition when feeding dogs. In 2016, the British Small Animal Veterinary Association Congress, discussed the health implications and nutritional balance of raw feeding. The consensus of the panel was that raw feeding could potentially lead to health and nutritional imbalances when owners did not comply with guidelines, and that education of owners was critical.

== See also ==
- Paleolithic diet
- Raw foodism
