= Ramin (disambiguation) =

Ramin (transliterated from Rāmin) is a given name and surname. Ramin may also refer to:

Places

- Ramin, Germany, a municipality in Mecklenburg-Vorpommern, Germany
- Ramin, Khuzestan, a city in Khuzestan Province, Iran
- Ramin, Sistan and Baluchestan, a village in Sistan and Baluchestan Province, Iran
- Ramin, Tehran, a village in Tehran Province, Iran
- Ramin, Zanjan, a village in Zanjan Province, Iran
- Ramin, Punjab, a town and Union Council of Dera Ghazi Khan District in the Punjab province of Pakistan
- Ramin, Tulkarm, a Palestinian village in the northeastern West Bank

In fiction

- Ramin, a character in Shahnameh, the famous poetic epic by Iranian national poet Ferdowsi. He hides during the battle between Rostam and Sohrab, a metaphor for the weakness inside the human heart
- Ramin, a character in the poem Vis u Ramin, an ancient love story in Persian literature composed in poetry by the Persian poet Asad Gorgani (فخرالدين اسعد گرگاني) in the 11th century

Other uses

- Ramin, a common name of Gonystylus, a genus of trees in southeast Asia in the family Thymelaeaceae
- Ramin, a 2012 album by Ramin Karimloo
- Ramin (film), a 2011 Lithuanian documentary
