= Scarsdale High School =

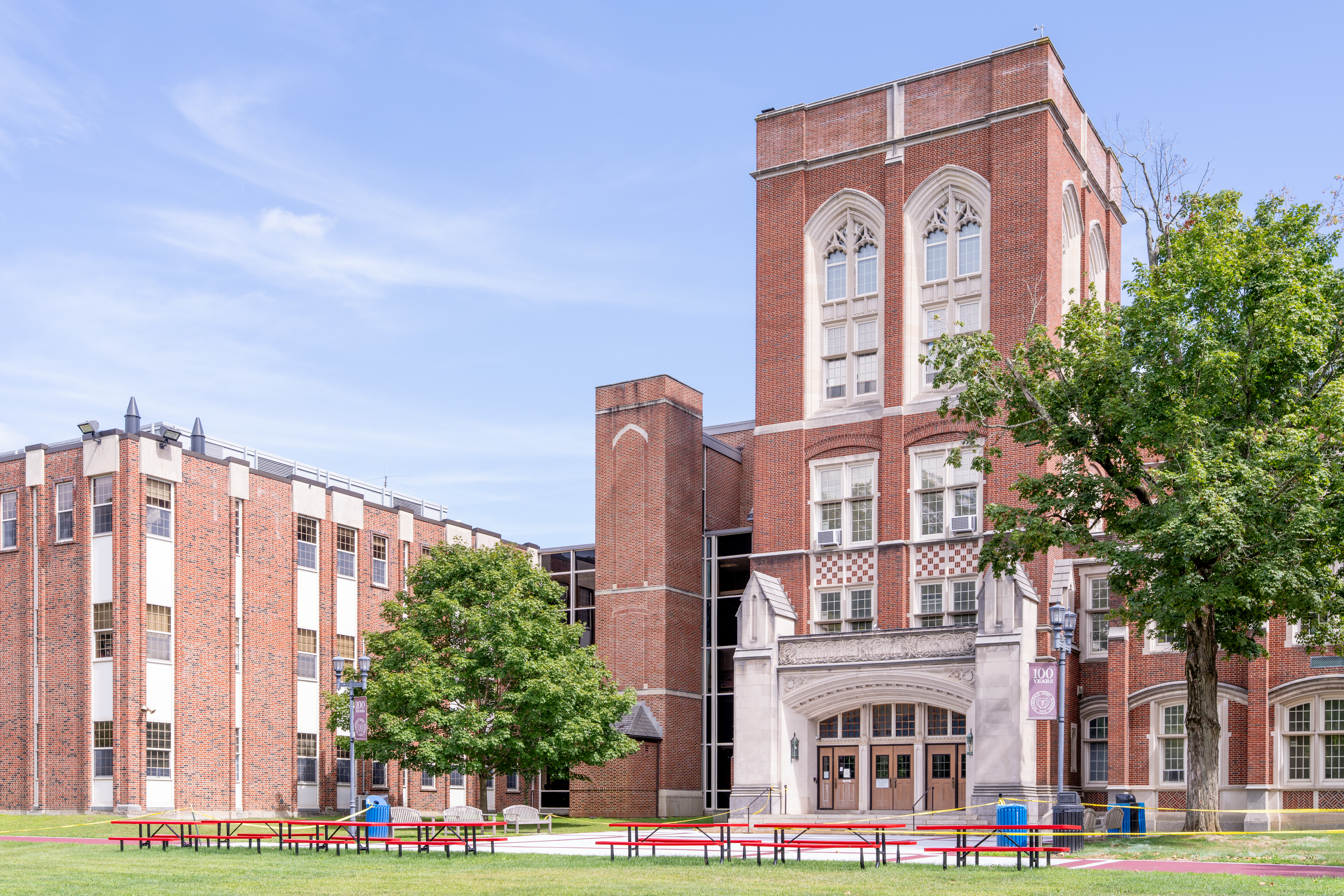
- Scarsdale High School from the Brewster Road entrance

Location
- 1057 Post Road; Scarsdale, New York 10583; United States; 40°59′41″N 73°47′35″W

Information
- Type: Public high school secondary school
- Motto: Non Sibi (Not for One's Self)
- Established: 1917
- School district: Scarsdale Union Free School District
- Principal: Kenneth Bonamo
- Teaching staff: 141.21 (on an FTE basis)
- Grades: 9–12
- Gender: Co-ed
- Enrollment: 1,258 (2022–23)
- Student to teacher ratio: 10.33
- Campus type: Suburban
- Colors: Maroon; White
- Athletics: Baseball, basketball, bowling, cheerleading, crew, cross country, dance, fencing, field hockey, football, golf, gymnastics, hockey, lacrosse, skiing, soccer, softball, squash, swimming, tennis, track and field, volleyball, wrestling, ultimate frisbee
- Athletics conference: Section 1 (NYSPHSAA)
- Team name: Raiders
- USNWR ranking: 776
- Newspaper: Maroon
- Website: shs.scarsdaleschools.org

Scarsdale High School (SHS) is a four-year public high school in Scarsdale, New York, United States, a coterminous town and village in Westchester County, New York. It is a part of the Scarsdale Union Free School District.

The school was founded in 1917. From the graduating class of 2017, 98% continued their education with college programs, and 97% entered four-year national and international colleges and universities. Twenty-four students in the class of 2024 (7%) were named National Merit Scholarship Semifinalists, and 42 (12%) students received National Merit Letters of commendation. Between 2007 and 2009, Scarsdale High School made a transition from Advanced Placement (AP) to Advanced Topics (AT) courses.

In the 2023–24 school year, SHS had a professional staff of 162 with a median teaching experience of 10 years. 100% of the faculty held a master's degree, 85% had 30 credits or more beyond a master's, and 7% had doctorate degrees.

The school is 22.3% Asian, 0.8% Black, 7.6% Hispanic, 63.0% White and 6.2% other.

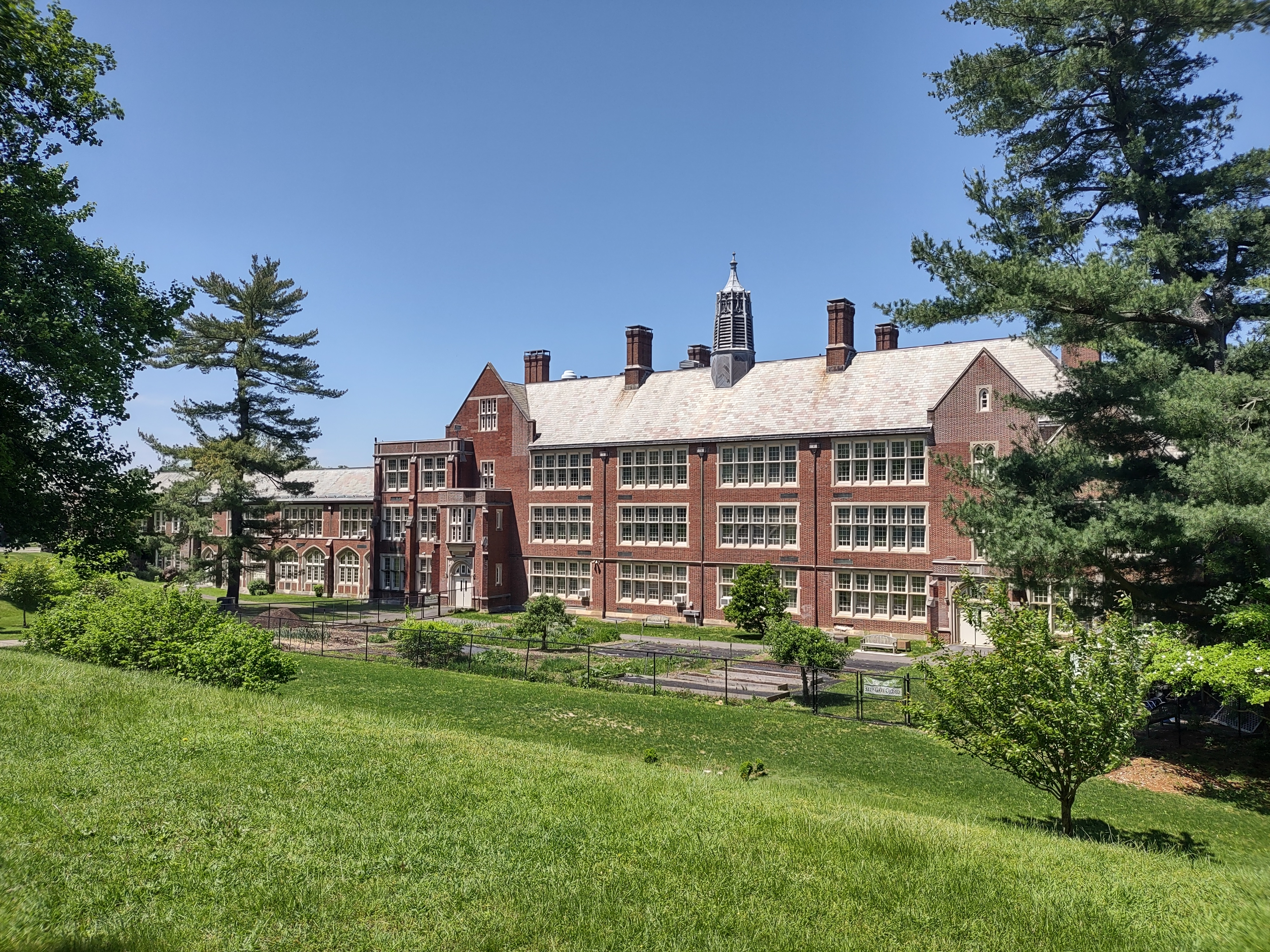
From Post Road

== Ethnic populations ==
=== Japanese ===
Around 1986 only 5% of the school was of Asian origins. By 1991 large numbers of Japanese students enrolled at Scarsdale High because their fathers, on business assignments from Japanese companies, moved to Scarsdale for the quality of the schools. By that year almost 20% of the students were of Asian origins, most of them were of Japanese ancestry and a few being of Chinese and Korean origins. The school established an English as a second language (ESL) program to help Japanese students adjust. Initially the Japanese students faced hostility from many of the American students, and some Japanese students had hostility towards classmates they felt were becoming too Americanized and/or socialized too much with Americans. Therefore, the Japanese and American students socialized separately. Principal Judy Fox formed the Multicultural Steering Committee to try to resolve racial tensions within the school.

== Curriculum ==
In 2007, the school stopped using the Advanced Placement curriculum and started using the "Advanced Topics" curriculum instead. Students were no longer required to take AP examinations. The school continued to send its syllabi to the College Board, which designs and administers AP examinations. In 2008, Winnie Hu of The New York Times wrote "most students and teachers here praise the change for replacing mountains of memorization with more sophisticated and creative curriculums." There were some parents who did not support the change. A vice president of the College Board, Trevor Packer, argued that the new curriculum had a "very cosmetic" difference to the old one.

== Athletics ==
- Boys soccer state champions (2022,2023)
- Girls tennis state champions (2021, 2022, 2023)
- Girls golf state champions (2019, 2024)

== Notable alumni ==
- Jacqueline Alemany (2007), journalist
- Eric Alterman (1978), Nation columnist
- Jacob M. Appel (1992), author and bioethics scholar
- Nan Aron (1966), civil rights advocate, public interest lawyer
- Nancy Atlas (1967), United States federal judge
- Greg M. Behrman (1994), author; Henry Kissinger Fellow for Foreign Policy at The Aspen Institute; founder, editor and CEO of NationSwell
- Marc Bell (1985), Three Time Tony Award winner
- Dan Biederman (1971), urban management pioneer
- Leslie Cannold (1983), author, commentator, ethicist, activist
- Nick Civetta (2007), rugby lock/flanker
- Ed Cohen (2001), sportscaster
- Lizabeth Cohen (1969), historian, scholar
- Lydia Cornell (as Lydia Korniloff) (1971), actress
- Laura Dave (1995), novelist
- Lisa Donovan (1998), actress
- Robert Durst (1961), murderer, son of Seymour Durst and real estate heir
- John S. Dyson (1961), businessman
- Nicole Eisenman (1983), visual artist
- Eve Ensler (1971), playwright, performer, activist
- David Feldshuh (1961), physician, dramatist, artistic director at Cornell University
- Tovah Feldshuh (1966), actress
- Rob Fishman (2004), entrepreneur and writer
- Richard Foreman (1955), playwright, avant-garde theater pioneer
- David Galef (1977), novelist, short story writer
- Lindsay Gottlieb (1995), USC Trojans head coach
- Gordon Gould (1938), physicist credited with inventing laser
- Earl G. Graves Jr. (1980), basketball player
- Ross Greenburg (1973), executive for HBO Sports
- Peter Grosz (1992), actor
- Jonathan Haidt (1981), social psychologist
- Jeffrey Hoffman (1962), astronaut
- Richard Holbrooke (1958), diplomat
- Heather H. Howard (1986), health policy expert and political advisor
- Yanni Hufnagel (2001), college basketball coach
- Roger Harold Hull (1960), Educator, Administrator, Lawyer
- Andy Jassy (1986), CEO of Amazon
- Gish Jen (1974), novelist
- Kenneth I. Juster (1972), government official, lawyer
- Brewster Kahle (1978), founder of the Internet Archive and Wayback Machine
- Matthew Kahn (1984), environmental economics scholar
- Bob Kauffman (1964), professional basketball player
- Alison Knowles (1951), artist
- Barbara Kopple (1964), documentary film director
- Zach Kornfeld (2008), YouTube personality and member of The Try Guys
- Richard Kostelanetz (1958), writer and visual artist
- Glenn Kramon (1971), journalist, assistant managing editor of The New York Times
- Robert Kuttner (1961), journalist, editor
- David Lascher (1990), actor
- John Leventhal (1970), musician, producer, songwriter, recording engineer
- Mara Liasson (1973), National Public Radio correspondent
- Cabot Lyford (1942), sculptor
- Charles S. Maier (1956), professor of history at Harvard University
- Michael Mark (1968), musician/composer
- Linda McCartney (1960), photographer, wife of Paul McCartney
- Liza Minnelli (attended 1961–62, did not graduate), singer, actor
- Rick Moser (1974), NFL (Steelers) football player, actor
- Ethan Nadelmann (1975), writer and advocate on drug policy reform
- Nadine Netter (1962), tennis player
- Charles Newirth (1973), film producer
- Jack Newkirk (1932), naval aviator
- Judith Newman (1977), journalist and author
- Suzanne Nossel (1987), non-profit executive and human rights activist
- Geoffrey Nunberg (1962), noted linguist, author, professor (U C Berkeley and Stanford) and commentator on NPR's "Fresh Air"
- Emily Nussbaum (1984), journalist
- Dan O'Brien (1992), playwright, poet, librettist, essayist
- Jon Oringer (1992), entrepreneur and the founder of the popular microstock photography site Shutterstock
- Cathryn Jakobson Ramin (1975), journalist and writer
- Victoria Redel (1976), poet, fiction writer, professor at Sarah Lawrence College
- Bryan Reynolds (1983), playwright, Shakespeare scholar
- Thomas E. Ricks (1973), journalist
- Tom Rogers (1972), media executive
- Cynthia E. Rosenzweig (1976), climatologist
- Dan Rosensweig (1979), business executive, CEO of Chegg
- Elisabeth Rosenthal (1974), physician, journalist for The New York Times
- Douglas Rushkoff (1979), media theorist, writer, columnist, lecturer, graphic novelist and documentarian
- David Rusk (1958), author and consultant on regional strategies for metropolitan areas, former mayor of Albuquerque, member of the New Mexico legislature
- Daniel Schacter (1970), psychologist
- Noah Schnapp (2022), actor
- Carl Emil Schorske (1932), cultural historian
- Christopher M. Schroeder (1982), entrepreneur
- Alan Schwarz (1986), sportswriter
- John E. Schwarz (1957), political scientist, distinguished senior fellow at Demos
- DJ Shiftee (2004), DJ, turntablist, born Samuel Morris Zornow
- Cevin Soling (1984), filmmaker, musician, and writer
- Aaron Sorkin (1979), screenwriter
- Andrew Ross Sorkin (1995), journalist
- Richard Stengel (1973), editor of Time magazine
- Roderick Stephens (1927), sailor
- Carolyn Strauss (1981), television executive and producer
- George Sugihara (1968), theoretical biologist
- Ivan Sutherland (1955), Internet pioneer
- Ojetta Rogeriee Thompson (1969), judge
- Nina Totenberg (1962), journalist, NPR legal affairs correspondent
- James Traub (1972), journalist
- Gary Trauner (1979), Wyoming politician
- Florence Wald (1934), nurse, professor, administrator
- John Wallach (1960), journalist, author, editor, founder of Seeds of Peace
- Ellen Weiss (1977), radio executive
- Bob Wilber (1945), jazz clarinetist, saxophonist, band leader
- Harris Wofford (1944), United States Senator from Pennsylvania
- George Zimmer (1966), entrepreneur
