= Behrmann =

Behrmann is a German surname. Notable people with the surname include:

- Lazar Behrmann (1830–1893), Russian educator and editor
- Marlene Behrmann (born 1959), American psychologist
- Michael Behrmann (born 1966), German field hockey coach
- Walter Behrmann (1882–1955), German geographer

== See also ==
- Behrmann projection
- Behrman
