= David Leisure =

American actor (b. 1950)

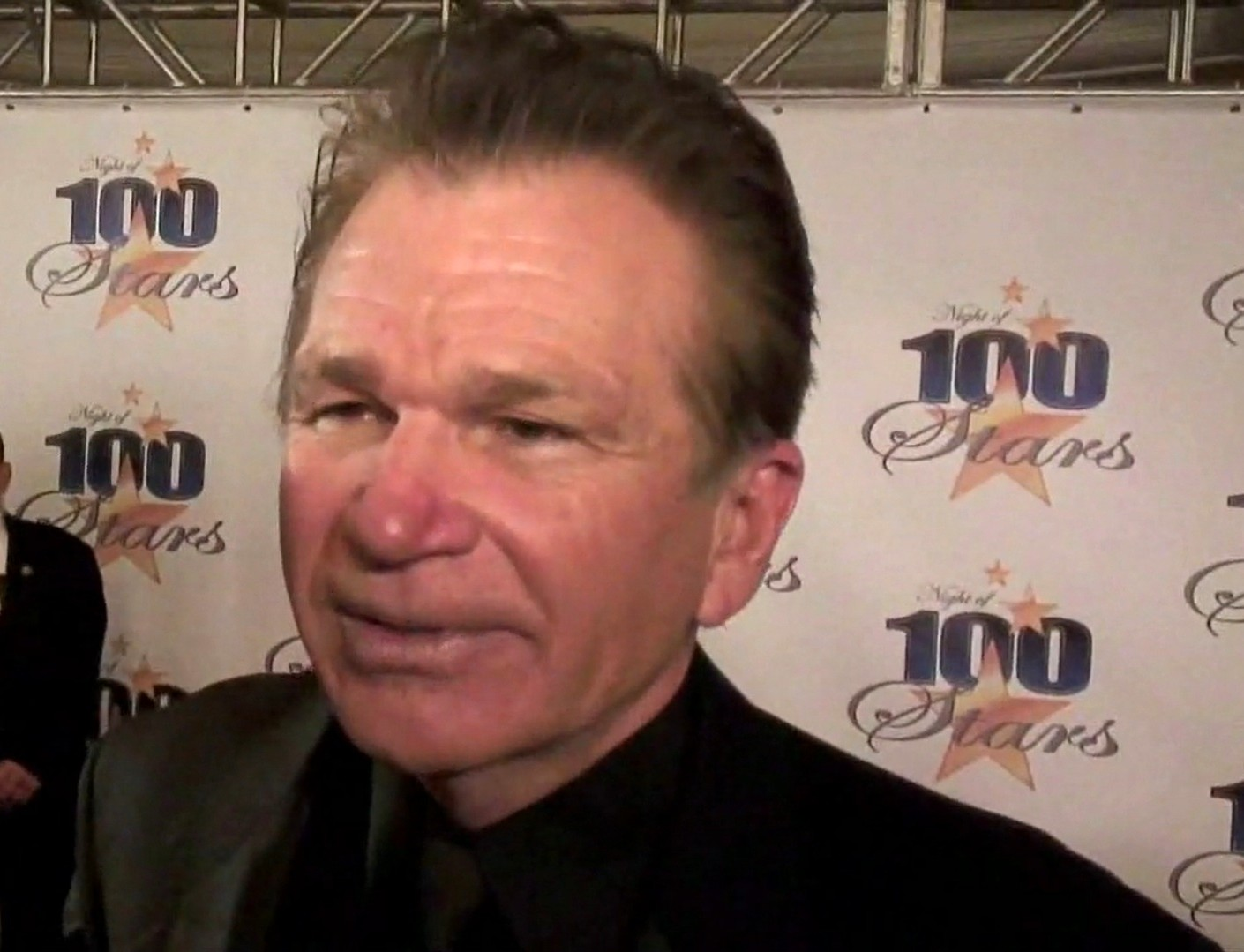
- Leisure in 2009
- Born: David Russell Leisure; November 16, 1950 (age 75); San Diego, California, U.S.
- Occupation: Actor
- Years active: 1980–present
- Spouse(s): Patricia Bunch (1997–?; divorced); Kelly Hutchinson (1989–1994; divorced); Flora Kleinfeld (1975–1983; divorced)
- Children: 2

David Russell Leisure (born November 16, 1950) is an American actor. He played Charley Dietz in the sitcom Empty Nest from 1988 to 1995 and fictional automotive "pitch man" Joe Isuzu in a series of North American television commercials for Isuzu from 1986 to 1990, and again from 1999 to 2001.

== Early life ==
Leisure was born and raised in San Diego. He graduated from Grossmont High School and attended San Diego State University.

== Career ==
Leisure moved to Los Angeles after graduating. His first acting job was a minor role in Airplane! (1980) as a Hare Krishna. He had been roommates with the star, Robert Hays, in college, but attributed his casting to his willingness to shave his head. He was not cast in any more roles for the next several years; this, combined with his first divorce in 1983, led to a brief period of homelessness during which he lived in a Volkswagen van. He eventually found work as a commercial pitchman, including a series of commercials for Bell Atlantic. Della Femina Travisano & Partners cast him as Joe Isuzu because they believed he could "lie like a pro". The character made over-the-top claims and obvious lies about Isuzu cars in a series of commercials throughout the 1980s. The character's popularity led to a costarring role as Charley Dietz on the television series Empty Nest. His Joe Isuzu character was brought back in 1999 and continued through 2001. Other roles include Roger Wilkes on the CBS daytime drama The Young and the Restless and, as of July 2010, a recurring role as Salem District Attorney Charles Woods on Days of Our Lives.

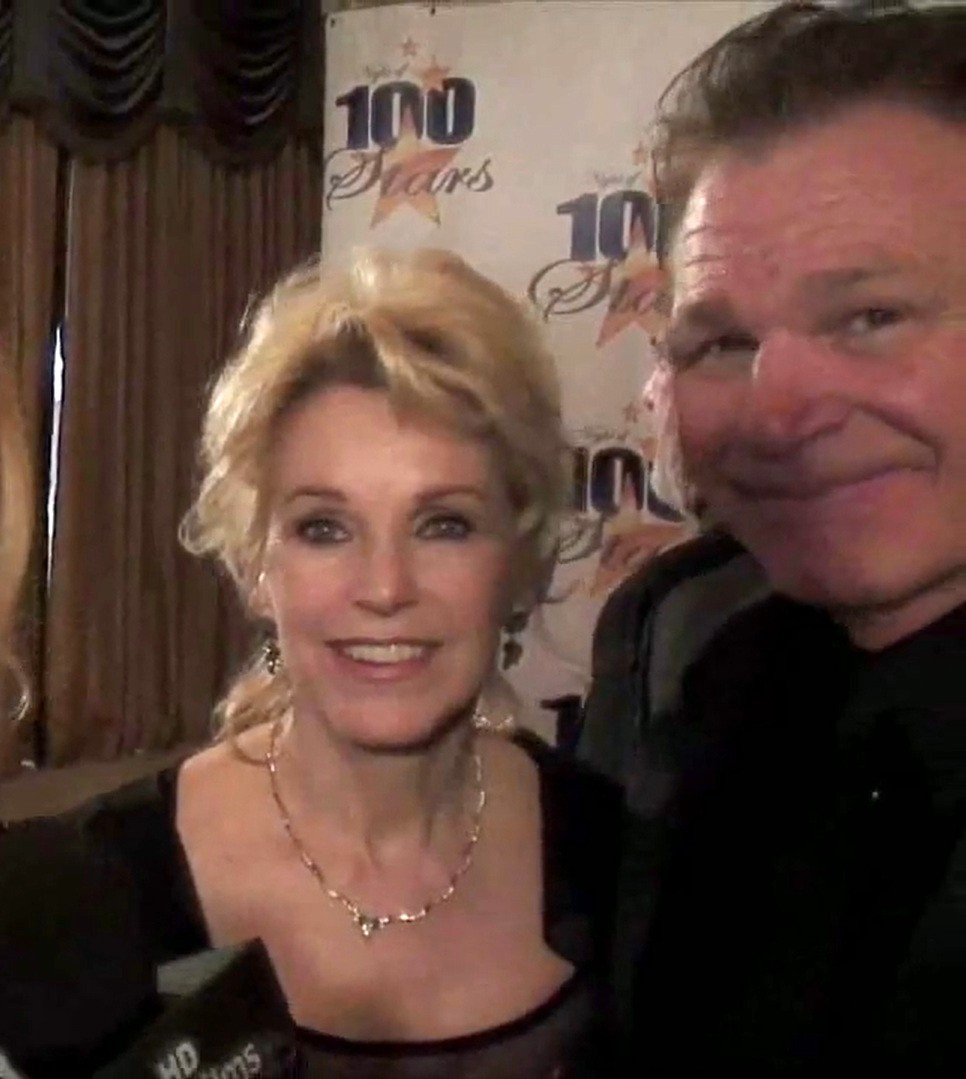
With wife Patricia Bunch in 2009

=== Roles ===
His additional credits include Sabrina the Teenage Witch, One on One, V.I.P., Diagnosis: Murder, The Parent 'Hood, Honey, I Shrunk the Kids: The TV Show, For Your Love, Caroline in the City, The Wayans Bros., Touched by an Angel, Lois & Clark: The New Adventures of Superman, Renegade, The Golden Girls, Married... with Children, ALF, 227, T. J. Hooker, The Equalizer, Falcon Crest, Sledge Hammer!, Nurses, The Brady Bunch Movie, and Power Rangers Wild Force.

== Filmography ==
=== Film ===
Year	Title	Role	Notes
1980	Airplane!	First Krishna	
1982	Airplane II: The Sequel	Religious Zealot	
1986	Say Yes	Police Sergeant	
1988	You Can't Hurry Love	Peter Newcomb	
1995	The Brady Bunch Movie	Jason	
1997	Nowhere	Egg and Ducky's Dad	
1997	Hollywood Safari	Troy	
1999	Fallout	Colegrove	
1999	Dogmatic	Pal Acres	
1999	10 Things I Hate About You	Mr. Chapin	
2000	3 Strikes	District Attorney	
2000	Behind the Seams	Milos Breneschov	
2001	Downward Angel	Charles	
2004	Elvis Has Left the Building	Hole-in-the-Head Elvis	
2005	Welcome to September	Elliott Faydo	
2009	Bionicle: The Legend Reborn	Metus (voice)	Direct-to-video
2013	Dancing on a Dry Salt Lake	Benny	

=== Television ===
Year	Title	Role	Notes
1982	Crisis Counselor		Episode: "Child Prefers Uncle"
1982	Wait Until Dark	Policeman	Television movie
1983	Falcon Crest	Waiter	Episode: "The Betrayal"
1986	The Equalizer	Man in Restaurant	Uncredited; Episode: "Dead Drop"
1986	Sledge Hammer!	Officer Jackson	Episode: "Magnum Farce"
1986	T. J. Hooker	Ben Fairly	Episode: "Shootout"
1987	If It's Tuesday, It Still Must Be Belgium	Andrew Selsky	Television movie
1987	Sledge Hammer!	Guard Chester	Episode: "Hammer Hits the Rock"
1987	ALF	Nick "Nicky" (The Fish) Mintz / Brandon Tartikoff	Episodes: "The Gambler" and "Prime Time"
1987	The Golden Girls	Oliver	Episode: "Empty Nests"
1988	Married ... with Children	Bink Winkleman	Episode: "Just Married ... With Children"
1988–1995	Empty Nest	Charley Dietz	Main cast 170 episodes
1991	Dinosaurs	Mr. Teddy Wolfe (voice)	Episode: "What 'Sexual Harris' Meant"
1992	The Golden Girls	Charley Dietz	Episode: "Questions and Answers"
1994	Burke's Law	Stan "Stormy" Gilliss	Episode: "Who Killed the Anchorman?"
1995	Lois & Clark: The New Adventures of Superman	Spencer Spencer	Episode: "Ordinary People"
1995	Too Something		Episode: "Money Grubbers"
1996	Renegade	Derek Devlin / Mr. Success	Episode: "Mr. Success"
1997	Pepper Ann	Sergeant Gene Fagan (voice)	Episode: "The Big Pencil / Sani-Paper"
1997	The Wayans Bros.	Mr. Masada	Episode: "Stand Up Guy"
1999	Recess	Guy McMahon (voice)	Episode: "The Beauty Contest"
1999	Honey, I Shrunk the Kids: The TV Show	Trace Cagney	Episode: "Honey, It's the Ghostest with the Mostest"
1999	Diagnosis: Murder	Lenny	Episode: "The Roast"
1999	Timon and Pumbaa	Sal (voice)	2 episodes
2002	Teamo Supremo	Will 2 Wynn (voice)	Episode: "The Will of the People!"
2002–2010	General Hospital	Reverend Grace	3 episodes
2003	Sabrina the Teenage Witch	Purser / Bob Bermuda	Episode: "What a Witch Wants"
2009	The Young and the Restless	Roger Wilkes	21 episodes Recurring cast
2020	The Goldbergs	Captain Roger	Episode: "Airplane!"
