= Empty Nest =

American television sitcom (1988–1995)

- Genre: Sitcom
- Created by: Susan Harris
- Starring: Richard Mulligan; Kristy McNichol; Dinah Manoff; David Leisure; Park Overall; Paul Provenza; Lisa Rieffel; Marsha Warfield; Estelle Getty
- Theme music composer: John Bettis; George Tipton
- Opening theme: "Life Goes On" performed by Billy Vera
- Composer: George Tipton
- Country of origin: United States
- Original language: English
- No. of seasons: 7
- No. of episodes: 170 (list of episodes)

Production
- Executive producers: Hal Cooper; Nina Feinberg; Susan Harris; Gary Jacobs; Paul Junger Witt; Rod Parker; Tony Thomas; Bob Tischler
- Producers: Gil Junger; Dennis Snee; Steven Sullivan; Ursula Ziegler
- Camera setup: Multi-camera
- Running time: 22–24 minutes
- Production companies: Witt/Thomas/Harris Productions; Touchstone Television

Original release
- Network: NBC
- Release: October 8, 1988 – June 17, 1995

Related
- The Golden Girls; Nurses

Empty Nest is an American television sitcom that aired for seven seasons on NBC from October 8, 1988, to June 17, 1995. The series, which was created as a spin-off of The Golden Girls by creator and producer Susan Harris, starred Richard Mulligan as recently widowed pediatrician Dr. Harry Weston, whose two adult daughters return home to live with him. The series was produced by Witt/Thomas/Harris Productions in association with Touchstone Television.

== History ==
An early version of the series initially appeared in the 1987 Golden Girls episode "Empty Nests" that was intended to act as a backdoor pilot for the spin-off, which was to begin during the fall 1987 TV season.

In the episode, George and Renee Corliss (played by Paul Dooley and Rita Moreno), were introduced as the Girls' neighbors, a middle-aged couple suffering from empty nest syndrome. Their teenage daughter Jenny (Jane Harnick), who had left for college, and Renee's brother Chuck (Geoffrey Lewis), also appeared. The Corlisses also had an annoying neighbor played by David Leisure (although in this version his character was named Oliver). The series was conceived in part as a star vehicle for Leisure, whose portrayal of car salesman Joe Isuzu had made him a national celebrity.

Moreno later criticized the Empty Nest pilot, calling it a "very, very bad show." She explained that the script desperately needed rewrites from creator Susan Harris, but she was very sick the week of shooting so it was left to other writers to fix. According to Moreno, "every day they kept changing my character, to the extent that by the time we got to do it in front of an audience I couldn't remember Line 1 because the attitudes had changed so many times. That was the most embarrassing experience...we must have done, I would guess, about 15 takes in front of an audience."

Ultimately, the series did not go ahead as planned and the premise was later extensively revamped with a new cast before Empty Nest debuted in 1988. The set of the Corlisses' house, however, was exactly the same as the one that later became the Weston residence.

== Premise ==
The show's story revolves around Miami pediatrician Dr. Harry Weston, whose life is turned upside down when his wife, Libby, dies and two of his adult daughters move back into the family home. His third daughter Emily (Lisa Rieffel) later returns from college to the nest. Early episodes establish that the Golden Girls characters are neighbors of the Westons. Original Golden Girls actors, Bea Arthur, Rue McClanahan, Betty White and Estelle Getty all guest-star as their Golden Girls characters, and Mulligan appears occasionally on The Golden Girls.

In the show, eldest daughter Carol is a high-strung recent divorcée, while middle daughter Barbara is a tough undercover police officer. The two sisters frequently bicker and vie for the attention of their father, whom they call "Daddy". The Westons' large dog Dreyfuss also prominently features as a member of the household.

In 1992, Kristy McNichol, who played Barbara, left the show, and Lisa Rieffel joined the cast as the third Weston daughter, Emily. Her character had previously not been shown onscreen, but had been mentioned as being away at college. Rieffel left after one season, and for the show's final two seasons only eldest daughter Carol remained of the Weston children. Kristy McNichol returned for the series finale in 1995.

Another main character is the Westons' neighbor and friend, Charley Dietz (David Leisure), a womanizing cruise ship employee who frequently enters the house uninvited and takes food or makes sexist comments. Charley has a father-son relationship with Harry and a love-hate relationship with Carol. Charley's role increased in later seasons after Leisure's other role as Joe Isuzu was discontinued.

Harry Weston's job is another major focus for the show. For the first five seasons, he works at a hospital, where he is assisted by wisecracking Southern nurse Laverne, played throughout the series by Park Overall. Laverne and Harry are shown to be good friends. In season six, Harry retires, eventually going to work for a struggling inner-city medical clinic run by the tough-talking Dr. Maxine Douglas. Nurse Laverne, having been fired by Dr. Weston's replacement, comes to work there as well.

Another character who appears is Carol's boyfriend, Patrick, an artist who is almost as eccentric as she is. Patrick convinces the Westons to let him use their empty garage as his new painting studio and, when his relationship with Carol becomes serious, he eventually moves into the house. Carol and Patrick's romantic bliss is short-lived, and they break up at the beginning of season six. Carol then finds she is pregnant with Patrick's child, and chooses to raise the baby, Scotty, on her own.

Estelle Getty reprised her Golden Girls character Sophia Petrillo during Empty Nest's final two seasons (after the cancellation of The Golden Palace). In the show, it is explained that Sophia has moved back into the nearby Shady Pines retirement home.

== Cast ==
- Richard Mulligan as Dr. Harry Weston
- Dinah Manoff as Carol Weston
- Kristy McNichol as Barbara Weston (1988–1992, 1995)
- David Leisure as Charley Dietz
- Park Overall as Laverne Todd
- Paul Provenza as Patrick Arcola (1992–1993)
- Lisa Rieffel as Emily Weston (1993)
- Marsha Warfield as Dr. Maxine Douglas (1993–1995)
- Estelle Getty as Sophia Petrillo (1993–1995)
- Bear the Dog as Dreyfuss the St. Bernard-Golden Retriever mix

=== Notable guest stars ===
- Don Adams
- Bea Arthur (reprising her Golden Girls role as Dorothy)
- Diana Muldaur
- Loni Anderson
- Mayim Bialik
- Eddie Bracken
- Garth Brooks
- Patricia Crowley
- Angie Dickinson
- Stephen Dorff
- Morgan Fairchild
- Zsa Zsa Gabor
- Marla Gibbs
- Trevor Goddard
- Bobcat Goldthwait
- Lee Grant
- Harold Gould
- Pat Harrington
- Phil Hartman
- Earl Holliman
- Shirley Jones
- Gordon Jump
- Carol Kane
- Joey Lawrence
- Mark Linn-Baker
- Jane Lynch
- Wendie Malick
- Barbara Mandrell
- Rue McClanahan (reprising her Golden Girls role as Blanche)
- Edie McClurg
- Audrey Meadows
- Stephen Nichols
- Jerry Orbach
- Matthew Perry
- Donnelly Rhodes (also appeared on Soap as Dutch)
- Geraldo Rivera
- Doris Roberts
- Debra Jo Rupp
- Jennifer Salt (also appeared on Soap as Eunice)
- Peter Scolari
- Liz Sheridan
- Yeardley Smith
- Jeffrey Tambor
- Renée Taylor
- Danny Thomas
- Betty White (reprising her Golden Girls role as Rose)
- Grace Zabriskie
- Adrian Zmed

== Episodes ==
Seasons of Empty Nest
Season	Episodes	Originally released		Rank	Rating
Season	Episodes	First released	Last released	Rank	Rating
1	22	October 8, 1988	April 1, 1989	9	19.2
2	24	September 30, 1989	April 28, 1990	9	18.9
3	24	September 22, 1990	May 11, 1991	7	16.7
4	24	September 21, 1991	May 2, 1992	23	14.3
5	26	September 19, 1992	May 22, 1993	48	10.8
6	26	September 25, 1993	May 21, 1994	66	9.8
7	24	September 24, 1994	June 17, 1995	118	6.9

== Production notes ==
In 1991, Empty Nest spawned its own spinoff, Nurses, a sitcom about a group of nurses working in the same hospital as Dr. Weston. The three series (Empty Nest, The Golden Girls and Nurses) represented one of the few times in American television history that three shows from the same producer, all taking place in the same city and explicitly set up with the characters knowing each other from the very beginning, aired on the same network in one night. On at least two occasions, Harris wrote storylines which carried through all three series as fictional crossovers.

Richard Mulligan and Dinah Manoff (who depict father Harry and daughter Carol in Empty Nest) had previously appeared as onscreen father-in-law and daughter-in-law characters in the show Soap, created by the same production team. Jay Johnson, who had appeared on Soap as Mulligan's son, also made a guest appearance.

=== Theme song ===
The show's theme song is "Life Goes On", written by John Bettis and George Tipton and performed by Billy Vera. For the first three seasons, the song is presented in a slower, more melancholy yet comical arrangement. The original opening titles sequence shows Harry Weston taking Dreyfuss for a walk around town, with still images of the other regular cast members shown as they are credited.

When the third season began, a new opening sequence debuted, made up of footage from the series' episodes and showing each of the regular cast members.

For the final four seasons the theme song is presented in a higher, more upbeat arrangement with female backup singers, and the same title sequence introduced in the third season.

== Crossovers ==
The following is a list of Empty Nest episodes featuring characters from The Golden Girls or Nurses, excluding that Sophia Petrillo is a main cast member in seasons six and seven.

=== Season One ===
Episode 4: "Fatal Attraction" – Blanche Devereaux from The Golden Girls

Episode 10: "Libby's Gift" – Sophia Petrillo from The Golden Girls

Episode 14: "Strange Bedfellows" – Rose Nylund from The Golden Girls

Episode 17: "Dumped" – Dorothy Zbornak from The Golden Girls

=== Season Two ===
Episode 6: "Rambo of Neiman Marcus" – Rose Nylund from The Golden Girls

=== Season Four ===
Episode 8: "Windy" – Sophia Petrillo from The Golden Girls

Episode 20: "Dr. Weston and Mr. Hyde" – Rose Nylund from The Golden Girls

=== Season Five ===
Episode 20: "Love and Marriage" – Jack Trenton from Nurses

=== Season Six ===
Episode 2: "Bye-Bye, Baby... Hello: Part 1" – Casey MacAfee from Nurses

Episode 7: "Mother Dearest" – Casey MacAfee from Nurses

== Syndication ==
The series was first syndicated in September 1993 and within a few years, many local stations either began dropping the show entirely or moving it to overnight graveyard timeslots due to poor ratings. In September 2000, the show was pulled out of all markets by distributor Buena Vista Television, shortly before the death of series star Richard Mulligan.

During that time, Empty Nest aired on cable’s TBS from September 9 to December 6, 1996, and on WGN from September 9, 1996, to March 26, 1999, with both stations airing the series as part of the regular syndication run (both TBS and WGN were superstations).

In the subsequent decade, the series did not air on American television. Hallmark Channel, which also licenses the rights to The Golden Girls, picked up the rights to the show in early 2011 and aired it from February 26 to June 26 of that year, but eventually removed it altogether.

Upon its launch on April 15, 2015, digital sub-channel Laff began airing the series and continued until March 30, 2018. The show has not aired on American television since that time.

In Canada, the series was rerun on CBC Television during the 1990s.

In New Zealand, the show screened on TV3 during the 1990s.

In Italy, the series aired on Rai Uno (or Rai 1) under the name Il cane di papà (Daddy's Dog) during the 1990s.

In the UK, the series was shown on Channel 4 during the 1990s.

== Awards ==
In 1989, Richard Mulligan won both an Emmy Award and a Golden Globe Award for Best Lead Actor in a Comedy Series. The series received a number of other Emmy and Golden Globe Award nominations over the years, especially for Mulligan and for Park Overall, who was nominated three times for a Golden Globe Award.

Year	Association	Category	Nominee(s)	Result
1989	Golden Globe Awards	Best Actor – Television Series Musical or Comedy	Richard Mulligan	Won
1989	Primetime Emmy Awards	Outstanding Lead Actor in a Comedy Series	Richard Mulligan	Won
1989	Viewers for Quality Television	Best Supporting Actress in a Quality Comedy Series	Park Overall	Won
1990	Golden Globe Awards	Best Actor – Television Series Musical or Comedy	Richard Mulligan	Nominated
1990	Golden Globe Awards	Best Television Series – Musical or Comedy	Empty Nest	Nominated
1990	Primetime Emmy Awards	Outstanding Lead Actor in a Comedy Series	Richard Mulligan	Nominated
1990	Viewers for Quality Television	Best Actor in a Quality Comedy Series	Richard Mulligan	Nominated
1990	Viewers for Quality Television	Best Supporting Actress in a Quality Comedy Series	Park Overall	Won
1991	Golden Globe Awards	Best Actor – Television Series Musical or Comedy	Richard Mulligan	Nominated
1991	Golden Globe Awards	Best Supporting Actress – Series, Miniseries or Television Film	Park Overall	Nominated
1991	Primetime Emmy Awards	Outstanding Guest Actor in a Comedy Series	Danny Thomas	Nominated
1991	Primetime Emmy Awards	Outstanding Lead Actor in a Comedy Series	Richard Mulligan	Nominated
1991	Viewers for Quality Television	Best Actor in a Quality Comedy Series	Richard Mulligan	Nominated
1991	Viewers for Quality Television	Best Supporting Actress in a Quality Comedy Series	Park Overall	Won
1992	Golden Globe Awards	Best Supporting Actress – Series, Miniseries or Television Film	Park Overall	Nominated
1993	Golden Globe Awards	Best Supporting Actress – Series, Miniseries or Television Film	Park Overall	Nominated

== See also ==
- Dear John (1988)
- The Golden Girls
- Spinoffs
