= Greenacres Elementary School =

Greenacres Elementary School may refer to:

- Greenacres Elementary School - Greenacres, Florida - Palm Beach County School District
- Greenacres Elementary School - Scarsdale, New York - Scarsdale Public Schools
- Greenacres Elementary School - Spokane Valley, Washington- Central Valley School District
