= Scarsdale (disambiguation) =

Scarsdale is a village and town in Westchester County, New York, United States.

Scarsdale may also refer to:

== Places ==
=== United Kingdom ===
- Sutton Scarsdale, a small village in Derbyshire, England
- Scarsdale, an ancient hundred of Derbyshire, England

=== United States ===
- Scarsdale (Metro-North station), a station serves the residents of Scarsdale, New York via the Harlem Line
- Scarsdale Union Free School District, a public school district for the entirety of Scarsdale, New York

=== Elswehere ===
- Scarsdale, Victoria, a town in Golden Plains Shire south of Ballarat, Australia

== Other uses ==
- The Scarsdale Diet, a high-protein low-carbohydrate weight loss diet
- Viscount Scarsdale (created 1911) in the English peerage
- Earl of Scarsdale (created 1581 – extinct 1736) in the English peerage
