= David Kocieniewski =

American journalist

David Kocieniewski (born 1963) is an American journalist. He is a Pulitzer Prize winner for Explanatory Reporting.

== Current journalistic positions ==
Having joined The New York Times in 1995, and served as the paper's NYPD bureau chief and Trenton bureau chief before becoming the paper's Tax Reporter in 2010. In January 2015 he also became an investigative reporter at Bloomberg LP.

== Employment history ==
Prior to his current position, at the New York Times Kocieniewski reported for the Metro desk, focusing on: the New Jersey government, law enforcement and corruption.

Between 1990 and 1995 he was a reporter at New York Newsday and from 1986 to 1990 (focusing on corruption in the NYPD), The Detroit News, (focusing on politics and criminal justice).

== Awards ==
Kocieniewski won Pulitzer Prizes in 2012 and 2013. He authored a series entitled, “But Nobody Pays That,” examining the efforts made by companies to reduce taxes and how the tax system should be revised, which was awarded the 2012 Pulitzer for explanatory reporting. The following year he wrote an exposé about Apple's tax avoidance strategies as part of the New York Times iEconomy series. That series, which was produced by 10 Times reporters in all, received the 2013 Pulitzer Prize for Explanatory Reporting, for its “penetrating look into business practices by Apple and other technology companies that illustrates the darker side of a changing global economy for workers and consumers.” The jury added that Kocieniewski's work had “penetrated a legal thicket to explain how the nation’s wealthiest citizens and corporations often exploited loopholes and avoided taxes.

Kocieniewski has also been the recipient of awards from: the New York State Bar Association, the National Association of Black Journalists and the March Sidney Award for his General Electric Company exposé.”

== Recognition ==
His book ‘The Brass Wall,’ was cited as one of the top 10 nonfiction books of 2003.

== Acclaim ==
According to Glenn Kramon – Assistant Managing Editor at The New York Times – Kocieniewski is “a relentless, meticulous, fair-minded reporter with the patience to learn one of the most complicated beats in journalism. Many businesses and wealthy Americans count on the fact that people find taxes too difficult and boring, and therefore won’t be watching when they try questionable means of avoiding them. David helps ensure that attention will be paid.”

According to Charles Kaiser – judge for the Sidney Awards in 2011 when Kocieniewski's article won – this was “a classic piece of investigative reporting. Kocieniewski demonstrates that G.E.’s experience is emblematic of the way more and more giant American corporations have figured out how to reduce their annual tax bills to something close to zero.”

== Publications ==
Kocieniewski co-authored ‘Two Seconds Under the World,’ and wrote ‘The Brass Wall.’ During his studies at Binghamton, he wrote reviews for the local papers, The Evening Press and The Sun- Bulletin. His main focus as a student was on concerts: Aerosmith, John Cougar Mellencamp and The Grateful Dead.

In the series he wrote, ‘But Nobody Pays That,’ Kocieniewski demonstrated the corruption of federal tax whereby America's corporate tax rate – 35 percent – is among the highest in the world but due to “a bounty of subsidies, shelters and special breaks,” most companies end up paying less than competitors abroad. Ultimately, the series exposed many of Corporate America's tax secrets.

== Education ==
Kocieniewski has a Bachelors in English from Binghamton University (1985) and a Masters in Journalism from Columbia University (1986).

== Personal life ==
Kocieniewski was born in Buffalo, New York. He has two daughters and lives in Lambertville, NJ.
