= Behrman =

Behrman is a surname. Notable people with the surname include:

- Dave Behrman (1941–2014), American football offensive lineman
- David Behrman (born 1937), American composer
- Greg Berhman, founder & CEO of NationSwell
- Martin Behrman (1864–1926), American mayor
  - SS Martin Behrman, named after him
- S. N. Behrman (1893–1973), American writer

== See also ==
- Berman
- Behrmann
