= Alix M. Freedman =

American journalist

Alix Marian Freedman
- Born: November 25, 1957 (age 67); New York City, U.S.
- Education: Harvard University
- Employer: Thomson Reuters
- Title: Global editor for ethics and standards
- Awards: 1996 Pulitzer Prize Winner

Alix Marian Freedman (born November 25, 1957, in New York City) is an American journalist, and ethics editor at Thomson Reuters.

Freedman was raised in New York City, where she attended the Chapin School before graduating from Phillips Exeter Academy (1975). She graduated from Harvard University with a bachelor's degree in history and literature.

She is the recipient of several awards including the Pulitzer Prize and the Gerald Loeb Award. Freedman received the George Polk Award in 1999, making her family the first to have two generations to win the award. Her father, Emanuel R. Freedman, had won the Polk award in 1956.

== Career ==
Freedman gained her first experience in journalism writing articles for her school newspapers, first a few articles for The Exonian, at Phillips Exeter and then for The Harvard Crimson. At the time, she "didn't see herself continuing in journalism," even though her father, Emanuel Freedman, was a journalist. However, she did go into journalism.

In 1979, she was hired as a news assistant at The New York Times and worked there until 1982. In 1983 she worked as a staff reporter for BusinessWeek magazine until leaving in 1984 to work for The Wall Street Journal. Freedman spent 27 years with The Wall Street Journal, first with the Philadelphia bureau, (from 1984 to 1987) and then the New York bureau (from 1987 to 2011). During her time with the Journal, she was awarded three Loeb awards, the Pulitzer Prize, and the Polk award. In 2011 she left to become the global editor for ethics and standards at Reuters.

=== Coverage of the tobacco industry ===
During her time at the New York bureau, Freedman reported extensively on the tobacco industry. In 1993 Freedman and a colleague were awarded the Front Page Award for specialized writing for "Smoke and Mirrors: How Cigarette Makers Keep Health Questions 'Open' Year After Year."

As the tobacco industry continued to face more scrutiny, Freedman reported on a libel lawsuit, seeking 10 billion dollars, filed by Phillip Morris against ABC television and its owner Capital Cities Inc. The suit was filed over the word spiked, used in the broadcast story, referring to nicotine being added back to tobacco during the production process. Her story, "Tar Wars: Philip Morris is Putting TV Journalism on Trial in its suit against ABC," reported on the lawsuit and how the tobacco company was spending a million dollars a month for 20 attorneys in their fight against ABC. Capital Cities, having earnings of just 6.4 billion in 1994, settled with Phillip Morris, printing a public apology and paying 15 million to cover the tobacco companies legal fees.

Freedman was awarded the Pulitzer Prize for her continued coverage of the tobacco industry. In one of those reports, "Phillip Morris Memo Likens Nicotine to Cocaine," she wrote about a 15-page confidential internal document that pointed to the tobacco companies knowledge of the addictive nature of their product. The report explained that nicotine "'travels to the brain about eight to 10 seconds after a smoker inhales," "altering the state of the smoker.'"

The series of stories leading up to her Pulitzer are listed below:

- " FTC Will Overhaul Tar and Nicotine Ratings," The Wall Street Journal, October 18, 1995
- "Phillip Morris Memo Likens Nicotine to Cocaine," The Wall Street Journal, December 8, 1995
- "Full Text: Philip Morris Cos. draft report," The Wall Street Journal, December 8, 1995
- "Full Text: Patent Search," The Wall Street Journal, December 8, 1995
- "'Impact Booster': Tobacco Firm Shows How Ammonia Spurs Delivery of Nicotine, '" The Wall Street Journal, December 28, 1995

In 1998 Freedman, and Suein Hwang, shared the Gerald Loeb Award (deadline and/beat writing), for coverage of the tobacco industry's liability settlement.

=== Coverage of quinacrine and chemical sterilization ===
In 1998 Freedman wrote a series of stories on the chemical sterilization using quinacrine pellets, of more than one hundred thousand women, who lived in poor developing countries. Many of these sterilization procedures were unwanted, or done without their understanding and consent. She did extensive interviews with Stephen D Mumford, president of the Center for Research on Population, before traveling to Vietnam, where she was detained, and nearly arrested. She left after having her notes confiscated.

Although she didn't plan on it, "Population Bomb," had a global impact. The company that manufactured quinacrine, Siparm Sesseln AG, of Switzerland, discontinued production of the drug, and sterilization procedures, using the drug, were banned in Chile and India.

In the United States, the Food and Drug Administration sent letters to Mumford, warning him to cease distribution of the drug to any U.S. facilities, and to destroy their stockpile in North Carolina. Mumford shipped his stockpile of quinacrine out of the U.S. before the pellets could be destroyed and informed the FDA that he would no longer ship any of the drug to researchers in the United States.

The series of reports were published in June and August, 1998. The stories are listed below.

- "Population Bomb," The Wall Street Journal, Alix M. Freedman, June 18, 1998
- "Two American Contraceptive Researchers Export Sterilization Drug to Third World," The Wall Street Journal, Alix M. Freedman, June 18, 1998
- "India Bans Quinacrine Sterilization of Women," The Wall Street Journal, Alix M. Freedman and Jonathan Karp, August 1998
- " FDA Tells Two Researchers to Stop Distribution of Drug for Sterilization, " The Wall Street Journal, Alix M. Freedman, October, 1998

A CBS, 60 Minutes segment was broadcast on October 18, 1998, reporting on the use of quinacrine.

In a 1999 article, published by the American Journalism Review, Freedman said she told Mumford that she would "give a fair and honest assessment of the method" that he was such a strong advocate of, and she did. Freedman leaves the reader to decide what they think when reading her reports saying "I don't believe you should be a hostage to your own views."

Mumford was convinced the FDAs actions were an "abuse of authority" and were the result of a smear campaign and conspiracy theories.

Freedman was awarded the George Polk Award, and named as a finalist for the Pulitzer prize for her reporting on quinacrine and chemical sterilization.

== Awards ==
- 1993 Gerald Loeb Award for Large Newspapers, The Wall Street Journal, for "Fire Power," a series of stories about low-priced handguns and the family who dominated the market
- 1993 Front Page Award for specialized writing, presented by the Newswomen's Club of New York, (with Laurie Cohen), The Wall Street Journal, for "Smoke and Mirrors: How Cigarette Makers Keep Health Question 'Open' Year After Year."
- 1996 Pulitzer Prize for National Reporting, The Wall Street Journal, for coverage of the tobacco industry
- 1998 Gerald Loeb Award for Deadline and/or Beat Writing, (with Suein L. Hwang),The Wall Street Journal, for coverage of the tobacco industry
- 1998 Investigative Reporters an Editors Certificate, (large newspapers), for "Population Bomb," Wall Street Journal, for coverage of chemical sterilization
- 1999 George Polk Award for International Reporting, Wall Street Journal, for stories on the sterilization of women in the third world, often without their consent
- 2004 Matrix Award, Association for Women in Communications
- 2010 Gerald Loeb Minard Editor Award
