= Ramdin =

Ramdin is an Indian surname. Notable people with the surname include:

- Albert Ramdin (born 1958), Surinamese diplomat
- Denesh Ramdin (born 1985), Trinidadian cricketer
- Victor Ramdin (born 1968), Guyana-born American poker player

== See also ==
- Ramin
