= Dorothy Gaiter and John Brecher =

American journalists, authors and wine critics

Dorothy J. Gaiter and John Brecher are American journalists, authors, and wine critics, wife and husband who jointly wrote the wine column "Tastings" in The Wall Street Journal between 1998 and 2009. They rated wines on a scale that ranged from "Yech", "OK", "Good", "Very Good", "Delicious" to "Delicious!". Their careers began simultaneously and have remained connected since their first meeting in the newsroom of The Miami Herald in 1973.

== Early life ==
Brecher grew up in Jacksonville, Florida and graduated from Columbia University in 1973, where he served as editor-in-chief of the Columbia Daily Spectator. Gaiter grew up in an all-black community near Florida A&M University in Tallahassee, Florida.

== Open That Bottle Night ==
In the late 1990s, Gaiter and Brecher invented the annual "Open That Bottle Night" (OTBN), encouraging their readers to open a symbolically significant bottle, and then share their stories. Since its inauguration in 2000, the event is always scheduled for the last Saturday in February, so the date may range from February 22 to 29.

== Books ==
Among their published titles are Love by the Glass: Tasting Notes from a Marriage (2003), Wine for Every Day and Every Occasion (2004) and several editions of The Wall Street Journal Guide to Wine.

== Final "Tastings" column ==
This is our 579th—and last—"Tastings" column. The past 12 years—a full case!—have been a joy, not because of the wine but because we had an opportunity to meet so many of you, both in person and virtually. Thank you.

— Dorothy Gaiter and John Brecher

Gaiter and Brecher announced at the end of their December 26, 2009 "Tastings" column in The Wall Street Journal that it would be their last. No reason was given, and no hint was provided as to what the couple would do in the future. The writers who later succeeded them as The Wall Street Journal wine columnists were Jay McInerney, Lettie Teague, and Will Lyons.

In 2011, in an interview with the Jacksonville Wine Guide, Gaiter and Brecher said that they "took the year off" in 2010—their first significant break from work in 36 years—and were undecided as to their next project.

== Recent accomplishments ==
In 2010, Gaiter was named Food and Wine Editor for France Magazine. In 2013, she was also named Senior Editor for grapecollective.com.

Brecher joined Bloomberg News in 2011 and, in 2012, was named Executive Editor for Enterprise. In May 2014, he was awarded the Lawrence Minard Award, one of two Gerald Loeb career achievement awards.

== See also ==
- List of wine personalities
