= Stephen Mumford (disambiguation) =

Stephen Mumford is a British philosopher. Stephen Mumford may also refer to:

- Stephen Douglas Mumford (born 1942), American researcher on fertility and population growth
- Steve Mumford (born 1960), American artist
