= Dora L. Costa =

American economist

Dora Luisa Costa
- Born: 1964 (age 61–62)
- Education: University of California, Berkeley (BA); University of Chicago (Master of Arts), (Ph.D.)
- Spouse: Matthew Kahn (1998–present)
- Children: 1
- Scientific career
- Fields: Economic History
- Workplaces: Massachusetts Institute of Technology; University of California, Los Angeles; National Bureau of Economic Research
- Website: http://www.econ.ucla.edu/costa/

Dora L. Costa (born 1964) is an American economics professor at the University of California, Los Angeles where she is the Kenneth L. Sokoloff Professor of Economic History. She is also the department chair of the economics department. In addition to her teaching position, Costa is a research associate at the National Bureau of Economic Research (NBER).

She is married to fellow economist Matthew Edwin Kahn who is a professor at the University of Southern California's economics department and a Bloomberg Distinguished Professor at Johns Hopkins University's Economics Department and Business School.

== Early life and education ==
Costa was born in Berkeley, California to Dr. Natalia Costa and Dr. Gustavo Costa in 1964. Costa earned her Bachelors of Arts degree in economics and mathematics from the University of California, Berkeley in 1986. She went on to earn an M.A. in economics in 1988 before earning her Ph.D. in economics in 1993 both from the University of Chicago.

== Career ==
After receiving her Ph.D., Costa accepted an assistant professor position at the Massachusetts Institute of Technology in 1993. She later became a Ford Career Development Associate Professor in 1997 before becoming an associate professor with tenure in 2000 and finally a full professor in 2003 at MIT, leaving in 2008. Since 2007, Costa is a professor of economics at UCLA, where she teaches economic history and health economics. In 2017, she became both the Kenneth T. Sokoloff Professor of Economic History and a department chair (from 2017 to 2021).

Her affiliation with NBER began in 1993 as a faculty research fellow before becoming a research associate in 2000. She is currently a researcher on their programs on the Development of the American Economy and on Aging and the director of the NBER working group Cohort Studies since 2000 as well.

Costa has also worked for the California Center for Population Research, holding the position of associate director from 2007 to 2017. From 2014 to 2016, Costa was on the executive committee of the American Economic Association. She was also on the Sub-Committee on Non-Discrimination in the Economics Profession from 2015 to 2017 and the nominating committee in 2016. Her past experiences include positions on editorial boards as well, including the American Economic Review, the Journal of Economic Literature, and a current position at Cliometrica, Journal of Economic Perspectives.

=== Research ===
Costa's research focuses on interpretations of labor economics, demography, and health through American economic history. Her research has covered several topics including but not limited to retirement, elderly living, older age mortality and morbidity, trends in population health and leisure, CPI bias, and social capital. A majority of her research compares and examines cross-sectional relations from the past and present have been changing. This is done with the goal of better informing our understanding of the future in these topics. She has written numerous works such as:

- Heroes and Cowards: The Social Face of War
- The Evolution of Retirement: An American Economic History 1880–1990
- Understanding Long-Run Economic Growth
- Health and Labor Force Participation Over the Life Cycle: Evidence from the Past
- Leaders: Privilege, Sacrifice, Opportunity and Personnel Economics in the American Civil War
- Surviving Andersonville: The Benefits of Social Networks in POW Camps
- Energy Conservation 'Nudges' and Environmental Ideology: Evidence from a Randomized Residential Electricity Field Experiment
- From Mill Town to Board Room: The Rise of Women's Paid Labor
- Power Couples: Changes in the Locational Choice of the College Educated, 1940–1990

Her current research focuses on two topics. First, she is investigating long-term trends in health inequality by social class at all stages of the life cycle. She also analyzes the effect of childhood health on morbidity and economic outcomes at older ages. The second topic is the intergenerational and transgenerational transmission of health and socioeconomic status.

=== Recognition ===
Costa has been awarded the Alfred P. Sloan Research Fellowship and was a fellow at both the Center for Advanced Study in the Behavioral and Social Sciences and NBER. She was awarded the Allan Nevins Prize for outstanding dissertation in U.S. economic history in 1994 by the Economic History Association. Her paper, "The Evolution of Retirement: An American Economic History 1880-1990" received the TIAA-CREF's 1998 Paul A. Samuelson Award for Outstanding Scholarly Writing on Lifelong Financial Security. In 2014, her article in the journal Law, Economics and Organization won the Oliver E. Williamson Prize for Best Article.

== Bibliography ==
- Heroes and Cowards: The Social Face of War (joint with Matthew Kahn). 2008. Princeton University Press.
- The Evolution of Retirement: An American Economic History 1880-1990. 1998. University of Chicago Press.
- Understanding Long-Run Economic Growth. 2011. (joint co-editor with Naomi Lamoreaux) University of Chicago Press for NBER.
- Health and Labor Force Participation Over the Life Cycle: Evidence from the Past. 2003. University of Chicago Press for NBER.
- “Leaders: Privilege, Sacrifice, Opportunity and Personnel Economics in the American Civil War.” (First published on-line, June 14, 2013.) Journal of Law, Economics, and Organization. 30(3): 437–62.
- "Surviving Andersonville: The Benefits of Social Networks in POW Camps." (joint with Matthew Kahn) 2007. American Economic Review. 97(4): 1467–1487.
- “Energy Conservation ‘Nudges’ and Environmental Ideology: Evidence from a Randomized Residential Electricity Field Experiment.” (joint with Matthew Kahn). 2013. Journal of the European Economic Association. 11(3): 680-702.
- "From Mill Town to Board Room: The Rise of Women's Paid Labor." Journal of Economic Perspectives. Fall 2000. 14(4): 101–122.
- "Power Couples: Changes in the Locational Choice of the College Educated, 1940-1990." (joint with Matthew E. Kahn), Quarterly Journal of Economics. November 2000. 115(4): 1287–1315.
