= Ramin =

Ramin or Rameen, transliterated from Rāmin (Persian: رامین), is a Persian masculine given name of Zoroastrian origin. It is also an occasional surname. Notable people with the name include:

== Given name ==
- Ramin Bahrani (born 1975), Iranian-American writer, director and filmmaker
- Ramin Bayramov, Azerbaijani journalist
- Ramin Djawadi (born 1974), Iranian-German composer of orchestral music for film and television
- Ramin Farahani (born 1969), Iranian-Dutch filmmaker
- Ramin Ganeshram (born 1968), American journalist, chef and cookbook author
- Ramin Golestanian (born 1971), Iranian physicist
- Ramin Guliyev (born 1981), Azerbaijani footballer
- Ramin Ibrahimov (born 1978), visually impaired Paralympic judoka of Azerbaijan
- Ramin Jahanbegloo (born 1956), Iranian intellectual and academic
- Ramin Karimloo (born 1978), Iranian-born Canadian musical theatre actor and singer
- Ramin Mehmanparast (born 1960), the Ambassador of Iran to Kazakhstan
- Ramin Rahimi (born 1969), Iranian percussionist
- Ramin Rezaeian (born 1990), Iranian professional football player
- Ramin Takloo-Bighash (born 1974), Iranian mathematician
- Ramin Toloui, American policy maker and portfolio manager

== Surname ==
- Cathryn Jakobson Ramin, American journalist, investigative reporter, and author
- Ezechiele Ramin (1953–1985), Italian missionary and artist
- Günther Ramin (1898–1956), German organist, conductor, composer and pedagogue
- Loga Ramin Torkian (born 1964), Iranian musician
- Manuela Ramin-Osmundsen (born 1963), French-Norwegian politician
- Mohammad-Ali Ramin (born 1954), Iranian politician and writer
- Obaidullah Rameen (born 1952), Afghani politician
- Richard M. Ramin (1929–1995), American university administrator
- Ron Ramin (born 1953), American composer for TV and film
- Sid Ramin (1919-2019), American orchestrator, arranger, and composer

== See also ==
- Vis and Rāmin
- Shahnameh (Iran's national epic, with a character by this name)
- Ramin, Tulkarm Palestinian Town
