= Emanuel Freedman =

American journalist and foreign editor of The New York Times for 16 years

Emanuel Ralph Freedman (December 2, 1910 – January 27, 1971) was an American journalist. He was the foreign editor of The New York Times for 16 years and then an assistant managing editor. He was known for his fieldwork in the 1950s on the Korean War, the Hungarian Uprising of 1956, the 1954 Geneva conference on Indochina, and the Suez Crisis.

== Education ==
Freedman graduated from William Penn High School in 1927. He obtained his degree from Columbia University.

== Career ==
Freedman began his career at The New York Times as a copy editor. He eventually worked his way up to become a deskman for the London bureau, then to assistant foreign editor, foreign editor, and finally as one of four assistant managing editors. During his time as an assistant managing editor, he was responsible for hiring foreign correspondents.

== Family ==
Freedman was married to Eva Bermant. After Freedman's death, Eva and her second husband Tobias Bermant, endowed a scholarship under Freedman's name. His daughter, Alix M. Freedman, is also a journalist.
