= Rebecca Blumenstein =

American journalist

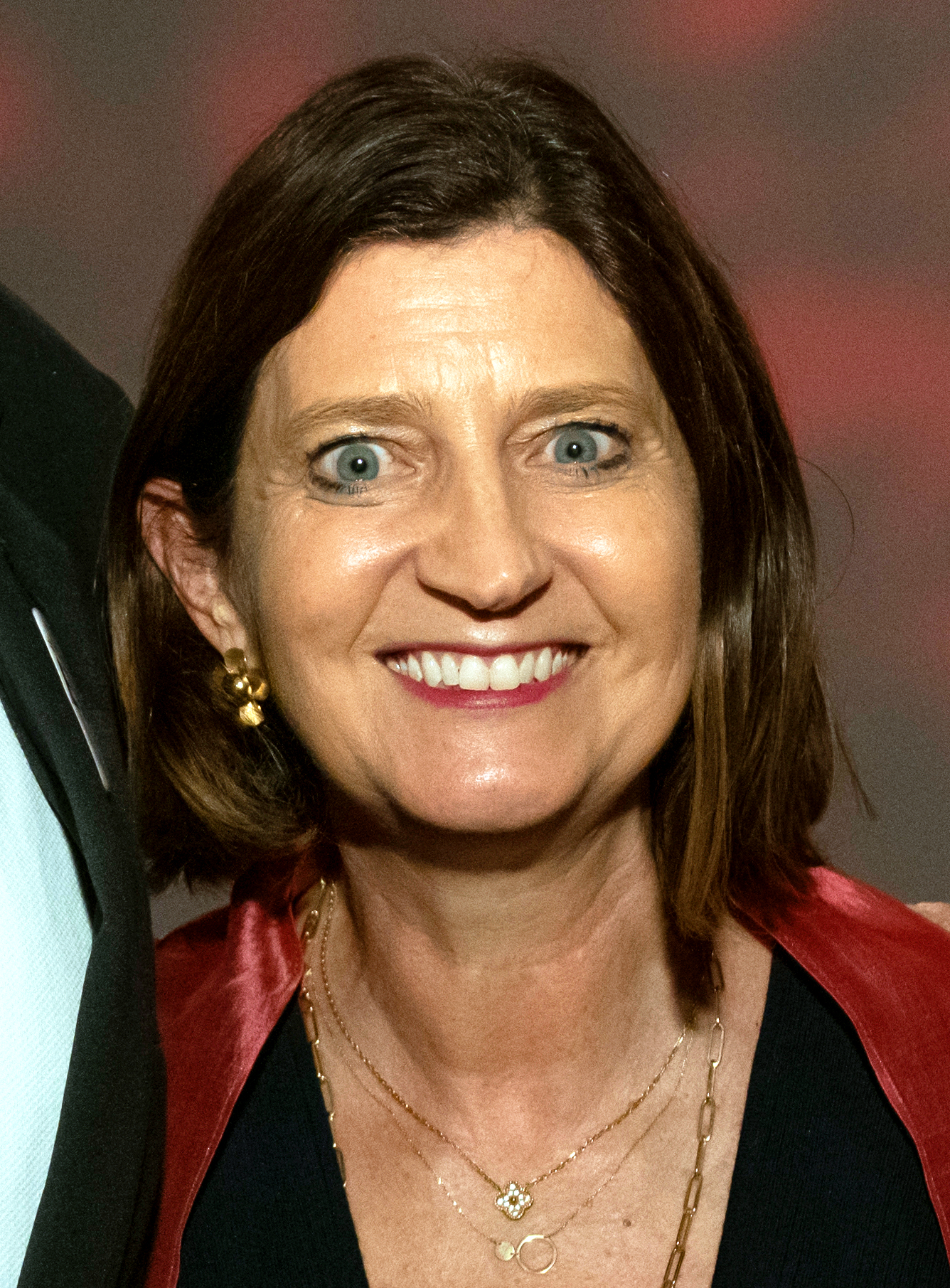
- Blumenstein in 2023
- Education: University of Michigan (BA)
- Occupation: Journalist
- Years active: 1989–present

Rebecca Blumenstein is an American journalist. She was named President - Editorial of NBC News on January 10, 2023. Prior to that, Blumenstein was one of the highest-ranking women in the newsroom at The New York Times. She is the chair of the board of overseers of the Columbia Journalism Review.

== Biography ==
Blumenstein attended the University of Michigan, where she studied for her bachelor's degree in economics and social science while serving as editor-in-chief of the Michigan Daily.

Prior to her work as a journalist, Blumenstein served as Michigan president of Young Judaea, a peer-led Zionist youth movement with programs throughout the U.S.

Blumenstein started her career at the Tampa Tribune, and then contributed to Gannett Newspapers and Newsday. Blumenstein started working for the Wall Street Journal in 1995 as a reporter for Detroit covering General Motors, then began covering China in 2005. She became The Wall Street Journal's Deputy Editor in Chief in January 2013. After more than two decades at The Wall Street Journal, Blumenstein joined The New York Times as the Deputy Managing Editor in February 2017, making her one of the highest ranking women in the newsroom.

At the Times, she served a variety of roles, including working directly with Publisher A.G. Sulzberger. She also oversaw the evacuation and relocation of over 200 New York Times employees and family members from Afghanistan. Blumenstein wrote about her role and some of the Afghans' adaptation to life in the USA. She was appointed President, Editorial of NBC News in January, 2023.

Blumenstein has reported on General Motors, Detroit, AT&T Corp., WorldCom Inc., the New York State legislature, China, and mergers in the telecommunications industry. In 1993, she won the New York Newswomen's Award for coverage of the Long Island Railroad shootings. In 2003, her team won the Gerald Loeb Award for coverage of WorldCom. In 2007, her team in China won the Pulitzer Prize for International Reporting. In 2009, she was named to Aspen Institute's Henry Crown Fellowship. She received the Gerald Loeb Award's 2015 Minard Editor Award for career contributions to business journalism.

In 2026, Blumenstein co-authored The Last Free Women (Grand Central Publishing) with journalist Diana Kapp, tracing four Afghan women from the 2021 Fall_of_Kabul_(2021), evacuation, and through their resettlement in America.
