= Lawrence Minard =

American journalist

- Born: November 19, 1949; Seattle, Washington, U.S.
- Died: August 2, 2001 (aged 51); Mount Rainier, Washington, U.S.
- Education: B.A. in Economics
- Alma mater: Trinity College
- Occupation: Journalist
- Years active: 1974–2001
- Employers: Forbes magazine; Forbes Global magazine
- Awards: Gerald Loeb Award 1977 2002; Business Journalist of the Year 1999 2000

Everett Lawrence Minard III (November 19, 1949 – August 2, 2001) was an American journalist and the founding editor of Forbes Global, the international edition of Forbes magazine. The Minard Editor Award is named in his honor.

== Early life ==
Lawrence Minard was born in Seattle, Washington, to Nancy and Everett Lawrence Minard Jr., on November 19, 1949. He had two brothers, Frank and Michael, and spent part of his childhood in Juneau, Alaska.

Minard earned a B.A. in economics from Trinity College in Hartford, Connecticut, and studied political economics at The New School in New York City.

== Career ==
Minard joined Forbes magazine in 1974 as a researcher and reporter. He soon forged a friendship with Steve Forbes, then a fellow rookie reporter, that lasted the rest of his life.

In 1977, Minard and David Warsh shared the 1977 Gerald Loeb Award for Magazines for their article "Inflation Is Too Serious a Matter To Leave to the Economists," in which they argue that inflation is made worse by higher taxes forcing merchants to raise their prices, and that economists fail to take historical factors into account.

Minard was a special correspondent in Asia in 1978. He moved to London to become the Europe bureau chief in 1979, then to Los Angeles in 1983 to be the West Coast and Asia bureau chief. In 1985, he was promoted to assistant managing editor. He became the deputy managing editor in 1987, and was named managing editor in 1989.

Forbes came under criticism in 1996 over allegations in Fortune magazine that Forbes's biggest advertisers were shown and allowed to make changes to articles in advance of publication, but were themselves off-limits to editorial criticism. Minard responded that advertisers were shown articles critical of them in case they wanted to pull their ads from the issues containing those articles, but they did not affect editorial decisions at the magazine.

Minard was widely expected to eventually replace James Michaels as the top editor of Forbes when he was instead chosen to become the first editor of Forbes Global magazine in 1997. Forbes had been licensing its name to various international publications, but decided to launch its own international business magazine to compete with The Economist and the international editions of Business Week, Fortune, and The Wall Street Journal. Forbes Global launched in April 1998 with Minard editing from New York City as well as writing the "Sidelines" column. Minard described the magazine's target reader as "[a] Swedish woman working for a French company based in Singapore and selling to the Chinese." In 2001, he moved to London to better focus the magazine on the business world outside of North America.

Minard won the Business Journalist of the Year award twice while at Forbes Global: first in 1999 for the November 30, 1998, cover story, "Act Two", then again in 2000 for the October 4, 1999, cover story, "Young, Rich, and Restless."

== Personal life ==
Minard married Elizabeth Bailey, and they had two children, Sara and Julia. He enjoyed travel, skiing, sailing, and mountain climbing.

On August 2, 2001, Minard and his daughter Julia went on a guided climb to the top of Mount Rainier in Washington. While ascending Disappointment Cleaver, he stopped at 12,000 feet elevation complaining of difficulty breathing, then stopped breathing altogether after a few minutes. A guide administered CPR to no avail. The coroner ruled he died from a heart attack caused by coronary artery disease.

== Honors ==
The Minard Editor Award was created in Minard's honor after his death by the UCLA Anderson School of Management as part of the Gerald Loeb Awards to recognize business editors whose work does not receive a byline or whose face does not appear on air for the work covered. Minard received the first award posthumously in 2002. The trophy was presented to his wife Elizabeth by his longtime friend Steve Forbes at the awards ceremony.
