= Minard Editor Award =

American journalism award

The Minard Editor Award is given annually as part of the Gerald Loeb Awards to recognize business editors "whose work does not receive a byline or whose face does not appear on the air for the work covered." The award is named in honor of Lawrence Minard, the former editor of Forbes Global, who died in 2001. The first award was given posthumously to Minard in 2002. The jury panel decided not to give the 2022 award.

== Minard Editor Award winners ==
- 2002: Lawrence Minard, editor of Forbes Global
- 2003: Glenn Kramon, business editor of The New York Times
- 2004: Michael Siconolfi, financial investigative projects senior editor at The Wall Street Journal
- 2005: Timothy K. Smith, assistant managing editor at Fortune
- 2006: Ronald Henkoff, executive editor at Bloomberg News and editor at Bloomberg Markets
- 2007: Dan Kelly, news editor, page one, at The Wall Street Journal
- 2008: Frank Comes, assistant managing editor at BusinessWeek
- 2009: Lawrence Ingrassia, business and financial editor at The New York Times
- 2010: Alix Freedman, deputy managing editor at The Wall Street Journal
- 2011: Hank Gilman, deputy managing editor at Fortune
- 2012: Winnie O'Kelley, deputy business editor at The New York Times
- 2013: Michael Williams, global enterprise editor of Reuters
- 2014: John Brecher, executive editor for enterprise at Bloomberg News
- 2015: Rebecca Blumenstein, deputy editor in chief of The Wall Street Journal
- 2016: Amy Stevens, executive editor of professional news at Reuters
- 2017: Nicholas Varchaver, assistant managing editor at Fortune
- 2018: John Hillkirk, senior enterprise projects editor at Kaiser Health News
- 2019: Michael Miller, senior editor of features and WSJ weekend at The Wall Street Journal
- 2020: Alessandra Galloni, Global Managing Editor at Reuters
- 2021: Garry D. Howard, director of corporate initiatives for American City Business Journals
- 2023: Nancy Rivera Brooks, deputy business editor at the Los Angeles Times
