= Rent-a-Kid =

- DVD cover
- Directed by: Fred Gerber
- Written by: Paul Bernbaum
- Produced by: Dan Howard; Jon Slan
- Starring: Leslie Nielsen; Christopher Lloyd; Matt McCoy
- Cinematography: Rene Ohashi
- Edited by: George Roulston
- Music by: Ron Ramin
- Production company: Initial Entertainment Group
- Distributed by: Republic Pictures
- Release date: November 4, 1995
- Running time: 85 minutes
- Country: United States
- Language: English

Rent-a-Kid is a 1995 American comedy film. It stars Leslie Nielsen, Christopher Lloyd, and Matt McCoy. It was directed by Fred Gerber.

== Plot ==
Cliff Haber runs an orphanage, and decides to go on a vacation. He has his father, Harry, run the orphanage while he is away. Harry has a rental store and decides that it would be a good idea to rent out orphans to prospective adoptive parents after he hears Cliff's testimony on how hard it is for him to find parents for the orphans he takes care of. Meanwhile, as Cliff is away, he gets a bigger idea by overhearing a couple at a Mexican restaurant, Russ and Valerie Syracuse, arguing over the issue of wanting to have children.

Through enough persuasion from Harry and giving it thought on their own, they decide to rent all three Ward children, Brandon, Kyle, and Molly. A couple, the Lachmans, come to the orphanage wanting to adopt a girl. They find and choose Molly which they tell Cliff and he spreads on to Harry, and as he gives the news to Molly, she is not happy, because she does not want to leave Kyle and Brandon. So, to try and fix the issue, they attempt to set out to behave as good as they can, so that Russ and Valerie will fall in love with them enough to want to keep them. But their plan ends up failing now and again. But even through all the pros and cons that Russ and Valerie face dealing with them for ten days, at the very last moment, they decide to adopt them. Meanwhile, Harry has been trying to find ways to keep his renting out orphans idea covered up from Cliff, knowing how eccentric he considers him to be for it. But due to a forum that he leaves out on the office table by a phone which Cliff happens to stumble on, when he returns at the end of the renting period, the attempts fail at the last moment, and he goes and scolds Harry outside the apartment building that Russ and Valerie live in, accusing him of being overly insane, but changes his mind, when he finds out that his plan worked.

== Cast ==
- Leslie Nielsen as Harry Haber
- Christopher Lloyd as Lawrence "Larry" Kayvey
- Matt McCoy as Russ Syracuse
- Sherry Miller as Valerie Syracuse, Russ's wife
- Amos Crawley as Brandon Ward, Kyle & Molly's first brother and Russ & Valerie's adoptive son
- Cody Jones as Kyle Ward, Brandon & Molly's second brother and Russ & Valerie's adoptive son
- Tabitha Lupien as Molly Ward, Brandon & Kyle's sister and Russ & Valerie's adoptive daughter
- Tony Rosato as Cliff Haber, Harry's son
- Michael Anderson Jr. as Mr. Nicely

== Accolades ==
In 1996, Ron Ramin won a CableACE Award for best original score.

== Sequel ==
The film spawned a sequel, Family Plan (1997). Nielsen and Rosato reprise their roles as Harry and Cliff Haber respectively.
