= Lettie Teague =

American author

- Born: Indiana
- Writing career
- Language: English
- Website: www.lettieteague.com

Lettie Teague is an American author and the former wine columnist for The Wall Street Journal. Teague was for several years with Food & Wine, as wine editor of the magazine from 1997 and executive wine editor 2005–2009.

== Biography ==
Lettie Teague was born in Indiana, and during her childhood lived in various places in Ohio and North Carolina. After studying English at Kenyon College, she held various wine-related jobs in retail, restaurants, wholesale sales, and marketing until becoming a public relations executive specializing in wine. In 1995 she became the food, wine, and books editor at the Hearst travel magazine Diversion, and in 1997 became the wine editor of Food & Wine. She remained with the magazine until American Express Publishing announced a reduction in staff in 2009, and Teague went on to write a blog for eRobertParker.com, online site of Robert Parker, for a brief period. In April 2010, three months after the departure of Dorothy Gaiter and John Brecher, she was announced as a wine columnist of The Wall Street Journal, along with Jay McInerney and Will Lyons.

Teague has speculated on a classification scheme of California wine, and launched a debate concerning Barolo. She has won three James Beard Awards, including the 2003 MFK Fisher Distinguished Writing Award, the 2005 Best Magazine Columns, and in 2012 Best Food-Related Columns for her work at The Wall Street Journal. She has been used as a wine authority by CNN.

Teague has described engaging competitive "guess that wine" blind tasting games with then husband, GQ food critic Alan Richman.

== Books ==
- Teague was illustrator and co-author of the 1995 book Fear of Wine: An Introductory Guide to the Grape by Leslie Brenner.
- In 2007 she published a book Educating Peter--How Anybody Can Become An (Almost) Instant Wine Expert. This is a beginner's guide to the essential facts of wine, presented in the form of a chronicle of her efforts to inform and educate her friend, Peter Travers, a film critic for the Rolling Stone.

== See also ==
- List of wine personalities
