= Matthew Kahn =

American environmental economist (born 1966)

Matthew E. Kahn
- Born: 1966 (age 59–60)
- Spouse: Dora L. Costa

Academic background
- Education: Scarsdale High School (1984); London School of Economics (G.C., 1987); Hamilton College (B.A., 1988); University of Chicago (Ph.D., 1993)
- Academic advisors: Gary Becker; Sherwin Rosen; Robert Willis

Academic work
- Discipline: Environmental economics
- Institutions: Johns Hopkins University; USC
- Main interests: Environmental economics, urban economics, real estate economics, and energy economics

Matthew E. Kahn (born 1966) is a leading American educator in the field of environmental economics. He is the Provost Professor of Economics at the University of Southern California. Between 2019 and 2021, he served on the faculty of Johns Hopkins University as a Bloomberg Distinguished Professor of Economics and Business, with appointments at both Carey Business School and Zanvyl Krieger School of Arts and Sciences.

== Biography ==
Kahn grew up in New York City and graduated from Scarsdale High School in Scarsdale, New York, in 1984. He then attended Hamilton College, where he obtained his B.A. in economics in 1988. During this time, he also obtained his G.C. in economic history from the London School of Economics. He earned his Ph.D. in economics at the University of Chicago in 1993. Kahn began his academic career as an assistant professor of economics and international affairs at Columbia University, and was promoted to associate professor in 1999. He moved to Tufts University as an associate professor of economics in 2000. Kahn joined the University of California, Los Angeles in 2006 as a professor. His primary appointment was at the Institute of the Environment and Sustainability. He also had courtesy appointments in the Department of Economics, the Department of Public Policy, the Anderson School of Management, and the law school. Kahn joined the University of Southern California (USC) as a professor of economics in 2015, and became chair of the department in 2017. In July 2019, he joined Johns Hopkins University as a Bloomberg Distinguished Professor of Economics and Business. Kahn has also taught as a visiting professor at Harvard University, Stanford University, and the National University of Singapore. In addition to his academic appointments, Kahn is a research associate at the National Bureau of Economic Research and has been a research fellow at IZA since 2013. He is also an associate editor of the Journal of Urban Economics and PLOS One.

He is married to Dora L. Costa. Professor Costa is an economic historian and demographer who teaches at UCLA. Kahn and Costa have collaborated on numerous papers. Their first publication together was a paper on the increasing number of highly educated young “power couples” moving to large cities. The two co-authored a book, Heroes and Cowards: The Social Face of War.

== Research ==
Kahn's research focuses on environmental, urban, real estate and energy economics. He investigates the causes and effects of urban economic growth and related issues of quality of life in cities. He has conducted and published research on public transit, sprawl, and the costs and benefits of environmental regulation in urban settings, as well as a comparison of the carbon footprints of different cities and investigation of how people living in cities are adapting to climate change. He is also known for his work on social capital. He blogs on these topics at greeneconomics.blogspot.com. In 2009, the Wall Street Journal named him one of the top 25 economics bloggers.

From 2019 to 2021, Kahn was the director of the 21st Century Cities Initiative (21CC). 21CC is Johns Hopkins University's center for research, teaching, and outreach on urban economic growth and quality of life. The initiative hosts workshops and symposiums, produces policy briefs, and fosters student research opportunities. The initiative collects and analyses data to evaluate the effectiveness of policies on the local, state, and federal level.

Kahn has published many papers and has authored nine books, including Green Cities: Urban Growth and the Environment (Brookings Institution Press, 2006) and (with Dora L. Costa) Heroes and Cowards: The Social Face of War, which was published late in 2008 by Princeton University Press. In 2010, Basic Books published his book on climate change adaptation and cities, Climatopolis: How Our Cities Will Thrive in the Hotter World. In July 2013, he published an environmental textbook, Fundamentals of Environmental and Urban Economics. In May 2016, Princeton University Press published his book, Blue Skies over Beijing: Economic Growth and the Environment in China. This book is co-authored with Professor Siqi Zheng of MIT. In February 2021, Johns Hopkins University Press will publish his co-authored book; Unlocking the Potential of Post Industrial Cities. In March 2021, Yale University Press will publish his book "Adapting to Climate Change" selected by Publishers Weekly as one of its Top Ten books in Business and Economics for Spring 2021

== Selected publications ==
Kahn has more than 21,500 citations in Google Scholar and an h-index of 71.

- Google Scholar citations

=== Books ===
- Green Cities: Urban Growth and the Environment, Brookings Institution Press, 2006.
- Heroes and Cowards: The Social Face of War, with Dora L. Costa, Princeton University Press, 2008.
- Climatopolis, Basic Books, 2010.
- Fundamentals of Environmental and Urban Economics, Amazon Books, 2020.
- Blue Skies Over Beijing: Economic Growth and the Environment in China, with Siqi Zheng, Princeton University Press, 2016.
- Adapting to Climate Change, Yale University Press, 2021.
- Price Theory Problems, Amazon Books, 2020.
- Unlocking the Potential of Post Industrial Cities (joint with Mac McComas), Johns Hopkins Press, 2021.

=== Selected articles ===
- 2005, The death toll from natural disasters: the role of income, geography, and institutions, in: Review of Economics and Statistics. Vol. 87, nº 2; 271–284.
- 2004 with EL Glaeser, Sprawl and urban growth, in: Handbook of Regional and Urban Economics. Vol. 4; 2481–2527.
- 2008 with EL Glaeser, J Rappaport, Why do the poor live in cities? The role of public transportation, in: Journal of Urban Economics. Vol. 63, nº 1; 1-24.
- 2010 with EL Glaeser, The greenness of cities: Carbon dioxide emissions and urban development, in: Journal of Urban Economics. Vol. 67, nº 3; 404–418.
