= Judy Licht =

American television and print journalist

Judy Licht is an American television and print journalist whose work often focuses on the entertainment and fashion worlds. Born to Bernard and Eleanor Licht of New York, Licht graduated from Connecticut College and received her master's degree in Broadcast Journalism from Syracuse University.

For decades Licht has held many on-air positions in the New York metropolitan area, such as co-anchor of Good Morning New York on WABC-TV, as a reporter on WCBS-TV, WNYW-TV and WNYE-TV, and was long the main host of the fashion program Full Frontal Fashion. She currently writes a column on the fashion world for The Huffington Post and has also written on fashion for such publications as Details, New York and the New York Daily News.

Licht married prominent advertising executive Jerry Della Femina in 1983. They maintained a restaurant, Della Femina, in East Hampton, until it was sold early in 2011. Licht and Della Femina collaborated on a television program for NY1 in the early 90s, The Jerry and Judy Show. Licht is Jewish whereas Della Femina is Catholic; the couple raised their two children.
