= Ron Travisano =

American advertising executive (1938–2025)

Ron Travisano (May 3, 1938 – January 21, 2025) was an American advertising executive. He is best known for co-creating the "Meow meow meow meow" jingle and commercials for Ralston Purina's Meow Mix. He also co-created a series of commercials featuring the fictional Joe Isuzu for Isuzu in the United States. He was a business partner of Jerry Della Femina, with whom he ran Della Femina Travisano & Partners. He was also part of the "Tuesday Team" that ran President Ronald Reagan's successful re-election campaign in 1984. He died from complications of a stroke at age 86.
