= Vasili Behrmann =

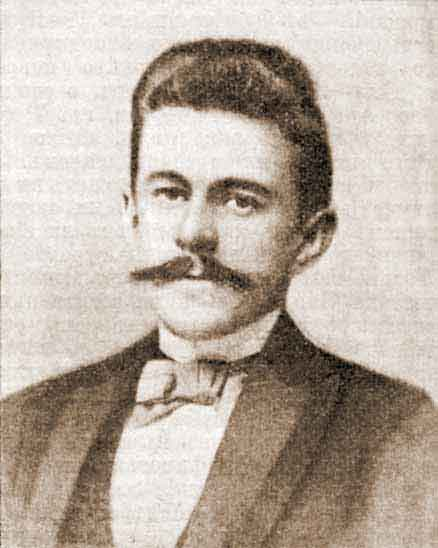
- Portrait of Behrmann
- Born: 15 September 1862; Mitau, Russian Empire (now Jelgava, Latvia)
- Died: 18 March 1896 (aged 33); Cairo, Khedivate of Egypt
- Occupations: Lawyer, writer, activist
- Father: Lazar Behrmann

Vasili (Ze'ev Wolf) Lazarovich Behrmann (Russian: Василий Лазаревич Берман, romanized: Vasiliy Lazarevich Berman; Yiddish: זאב וואָלף בעהרמאן, romanized: Zev Volf Behrman; 15 September 1862 – 18 March 1896) was a Russian Jewish lawyer, writer, and early supporter of the proto-Zionist movement Hovevei Zion. He was active in Jewish public affairs, journalism, and organizational work in the late Russian Empire.

== Biography ==
=== Early life and education ===
Behrmann was born into a Jewish family in Mitau in the Russian Empire (present-day Jelgava, Latvia). He was the son of Lazar Behrmann, an educator. He received his early education at his father's school in Saint Petersburg, and afterwards attended a gymnasium. He later studied law at the University of Saint Petersburg, graduating in 1885.

While a student, he edited the foreign news section of Russki Yevrei, a Jewish periodical published by his father, and published original and translated poems under the pseudonym "Ben-Eliezer".

=== Activism ===
Behrmann became a dedicated Zionist after the anti-Jewish riots in southern Russia in the 1880s. He was an early supporter of the Hovevei Zion movement and participated in efforts promoting Jewish emigration to Palestine. He notably attended the Katowice Conference and lobbied for the legalization of the Odessa Committee.

Besides his Zionist activism, Behrmann devoted much of his energy to Russian-Jewish public affairs, and helped establish the Historical-Ethnographic Commission of the Society for the Promotion of Culture among the Jews of Russia.

Behrmann worked within the Jewish Colonisation Association, where he served as secretary of the central committee. In this capacity, he conducted an extended research trip across Europe in 1893 to study the emigration issue. His report served as the basis to the creation of a dedicated emigration department within the organization.

=== Later life and death ===
Shortly after his trip through Europe, Behrmann developed tuberculosis and relocated to Cairo, where he died on 18 March 1896 at the age of 33.

Leib Yaffe dedicated the poem "Wreath" to Behrmann's memory, and Yehuda L. Katzenelson dedicated to him the prose poem Tzion nefesh (ציון נפש).

== Writings ==
Behrmann's major publications include the anthologies Palestina (1884, jointly with Akim Volynsky) and Sion (1892), which set out the ideological foundations of the Hovevei Zion movement. He left in manuscript a work on "How to Regulate Russian-Jewish Emigration."

While in Egypt, he wrote a study on the local Jewish community.
