= Dogmatic (film) =

1999 Canadian-American TV film

- Written by: George Zaloom; Z.A.K.
- Directed by: Neill Fearnley
- Starring: Michael Riley; Leila Kenzle; David Leisure
- Composer: Ron Ramin
- Countries of origin: United States; Canada
- Original language: English

Production
- Executive producer: Joey Plager
- Producer: Susan Murdoch
- Cinematography: Richard Wincenty
- Editor: Stephen Lawrence
- Running time: 91 minutes

Original release
- Network: ABC
- Release: May 30, 1999

Dogmatic is a 1999 Canadian-American television comedy film. It aired on May 30, 1999, on ABC as part of season 43 of the anthology series Wonderful World of Disney. It stars Michael Riley as an advertising executive who switches bodies with a dog. It was directed by Neill Fearnley.

== Plot summary ==
Dennis Winslow is an advertising executive. He owns a dog, Rocky, and is engaged to Amy. After lightning strikes him and his dog, the two switch bodies. Dennis begins to consume dog food. When he encounters people, he licks their hands prior to shaking them. Amy breaks up with him. The duo find out that Pal Acres, his firm's largest customer, has a sordid secret of operating a puppy mill in a warehouse. While Dennis and Rocky attempt to liberate the puppies, Pal tries to court Amy and prove that the man and dog have switched bodies.

== Cast ==
- Michael Riley as Dennis Winslow
- Leila Kenzle as Amy
- David Leisure as Pal Acres
- Rick Ducommun as George
- Eugene Levy as Larry Palmer
- Joe Flaherty as Dogcatcher
- Chris Gibson as Scott
- Arlene Meadows as Neighbor
- Barkley as Rocky

== Production ==
Dogmatic was filmed in Canada in 1996. The film aired on ABC on May 30, 1999, as part of season 43 of the anthology series Wonderful World of Disney. The film's genre is fantasy comedy.

Barkley, the dog in the film who played Rocky, was a Jack Russell Terrier. His name was inspired by an Out of Africa character. He previously was a guest on The Drew Carey Show and Friends. A stunt double did some of his scenes.

== Reception ==
In a negative review, Gerald Pratley called the film a "pathetic piece of slapstick" and "a dog of a film". Rating the film two stars and touching on body swaps, David Parkinson of Radio Times wrote, "It has been done before in Big and Vice Versa and the canine angle adds nothing new."

The Guardian called Dogmatic an "uninspiring comedy", while The Messenger deemed it to be a "zany comedy". Writing in Redding Record Searchlight, Nancy McAlister stated, "In the tradition of films ranging from 101 Dalmatians and Beethoven, [Dogmatic] comes to its conclusion with some last-minute hijinks."
