= Marlene Behrmann =

American psychologist (born 1959)

- Born: April 14, 1959 (age 67)
- Education: University of Witwatersrand (B.A., 1981); University of Witwatersrand (M.A., 1984); University of Toronto (Ph.D., 1991)
- Scientific career
- Fields: Psychology Neuroscience
- Workplaces: University of Toronto; Weizmann Institute of Science; Carnegie Mellon University; University of Pittsburgh

Marlene Behrmann (born April 14, 1959) is a Professor in the Department of Ophthalmology at the University of Pittsburgh. She was previously a Professor of Psychology at Carnegie Mellon University. She specializes in the cognitive neuroscience of visual perception, with a specific focus on object recognition.

== Education ==
Marlene Behrmann was born in Johannesburg, South Africa, April 14, 1959. She received a B.A. in speech and hearing therapy from the University of Witwatersrand in Johannesburg, South Africa in 1981; an M.A. in speech pathology from the University of Witwatersrand in 1984, and a Ph.D. in Psychology from the University of Toronto in 1991.

== Career and research ==
From 1991 to 1993, Behrmann worked in the Departments of Psychology and Medicine of the University of Toronto, and in 1993, she accepted a position as a faculty member in the Department of Psychology at Carnegie Mellon University, where she remained until moving to the Department of Ophthalmology at the University of Pittsburgh in 2022. She has also held an adjunct professorship in the Departments of Neuroscience and Communication Disorders at the University of Pittsburgh, and she has served as a visiting professor at the Weizmann Institute of Science in Israel in 2000-2001 and the University of Toronto in 2006–2007. Behrmann is a member of the Center for the Neural Basis of Cognition and the Neuroscience Institute.

Behrmann's research addresses how the brain assembles a meaningful and coherent interpretation of the information received from the eyes.

== Awards and honors ==
- 2015, elected member of the National Academy of Sciences
- 2019, member, American Academy of Arts and Sciences
- Fellow, Society of Experimental Psychologists,
- Fellow, Cognitive Science Society
- Fellow, Cognitive Neuroscience Society

== Representative papers ==
- Granovetter, Michael C.; Robert, Sophia; Ettensohn, Leah; Behrmann, Marlene (2022). "With childhood hemispherectomy, one hemisphere can support—but is suboptimal for—word and face recognition". Proceedings of the National Academy of Sciences. 119 (44) e2212936119. Bibcode:2022PNAS..11912936G. bioRxiv 10.1101/2020.11.06.371823. doi:10.1073/pnas.2212936119. PMC 9636967. PMID 36282918.
- Liu, Ning; Behrmann, Marlene; Turchi, Janita N.; Avidan, Galia; Hadj-Bouziane, Fadila; Ungerleider, Leslie G. (2022). "Bidirectional and parallel relationships in macaque face circuit revealed by fMRI and causal pharmacological inactivation". Nature Communications. 13 (1): 6787. Bibcode:2022NatCo..13.6787L. doi:10.1038/s41467-022-34451-x. PMC 9646786. PMID 36351907.
- Blauch, Nicholas M.; Behrmann, Marlene; Plaut, David C. (2022). "A connectivity-constrained computational account of topographic organization in primate high-level visual cortex". Proceedings of the National Academy of Sciences. 119 (3). Bibcode:2022PNAS..11912566B. doi:10.1073/pnas.2112566119. PMC 8784138. PMID 35027449.
- Avidan, Galia; Behrmann, Marlene (2021). "Spatial Integration in Normal Face Processing and Its Breakdown in Congenital Prosopagnosia". Annual Review of Vision Science. 7: 301–321. doi:10.1146/annurev-vision-113020-012740. PMID 34014762.
- Behrmann, Marlene; Avidan, Galia; Leonard, Grace Lee; Kimchi, Rutie; Luna, Beatriz; Humphreys, Kate; Minshew, Nancy (January 2006). "Configural processing in autism and its relationship to face processing". Neuropsychologia. 44 (1): 110–129. CiteSeerX 10.1.1.360.7141. doi:10.1016/j.neuropsychologia.2005.04.002. PMID 15907952. S2CID 6407530.
- Behrmann, M.; Bub, D. (June 1992). "Surface dyslexia and dysgraphia: dual routes, single lexicon". Cognitive Neuropsychology. 9 (3): 209–251. doi:10.1080/02643299208252059.
- Behrmann, Marlene; Geng, Joy J; Shomstein, Sarah (April 2004). "Parietal cortex and attention". Current Opinion in Neurobiology. 14 (2): 212–217. doi:10.1016/j.conb.2004.03.012. PMID 15082327. S2CID 7789667.
- Behrmann, Marlene; Winocur, Gordon; Moscovitch, Morris (October 1992). "Dissociation between mental imagery and object recognition in a brain-damaged patient". Nature. 359 (6396): 636–637. Bibcode:1992Natur.359..636B. doi:10.1038/359636a0. PMID 1406994. S2CID 4241164.
- Behrmann, Marlene; Zemel, Richard S.; Mozer, Michael C. (1998). "Object-based attention and occlusion: Evidence from normal participants and a computational model". Journal of Experimental Psychology: Human Perception and Performance. 24 (4): 1011–1036. doi:10.1037/0096-1523.24.4.1011. PMID 9706708. S2CID 184823.
