= Ramin, Sistan and Baluchestan =

Ramin رمين
- Village
- Location within Iran
- Coordinates: 25°16′30″N 60°44′58″E
- Country: Iran
- Province: Sistan and Baluchestan
- County: Chabahar
- Bakhsh: Central
- Rural District: Kambel-e Soleyman

Population (2006)
  - Total: 3,615
- Time zone: UTC+3:30 (IRST)
  - Summer (DST): UTC+4:30 (IRDT)

Ramin (Persian: رمين, also Romanized as Ramīn; also known as Ramīn-e Bālā) is a village in Kambel-e Soleyman Rural District, in the Central District of Chabahar County, Sistan and Baluchestan Province, Iran. At the 2006 census, its population was 3,615, in 694 families.
