= Lazar Behrmann =

Russian educator and editor

- Born: September 26, 1830; Friedrichstadt, Courland Governorate, Russian Empire
- Died: April 27, 1893 (aged 62); Saint Petersburg, Saint Petersburg Governorate, Russian Empire
- Resting place: Preobrazhenskoe Jewish Cemetery
- Occupations: Educator, editor
- Children: Ze'ev Behrmann

Lazar Jakovlevich Behrmann (Russian: Лазарь Яковлевич Берманъ, Yiddish: אליעזר בן יעקב בעהרמאן; September 26, 1830 – April 27, 1893) was a Russian educator and editor.

== Biography ==
Lazar Behrmann was born to a Jewish family in Friedrichstadt, Courland (today Jaunjelgava, Latvia) in 1830. He received his early education in the ḥeder and in the district school of his native town, where he began his vocation as private teacher.

In 1854 he settled in Mitau, where in 1861 he opened a private school for Jewish boys. The Jewish community of Saint Petersburg invited him in 1864 to found its first Jewish school, which remained under his management until his death. From 1869 to 1882 he was instructor in the Jewish religion at the Kolomenskaya Women's College in Saint Petersburg.

In 1879 he founded there the weekly Russian-Hebrew periodical Russki Yevrei, which he published and edited conjointly with Hirsch Rabinowitz until 1883, and after that with Judah Leib Kantor to the end of 1884. He was also the author of Osnovy Moiseyeva Zakona ('Fundamentals of the Mosaic Law'), a popular guide to Jewish jurisprudence, and of Sankt-Peterburgskiya Yevreiskiya Uchilishcha ('Jewish Schools in Saint Petersburg').

He died after a long illness on April 27, 1893.
