= Joe Isuzu =

- First appearance: 1986
- Last appearance: 2001
- Created by: Della Femina, Travisano, and Partners
- Portrayed by: David Leisure

In-universe information
- Occupation: Spokesperson of Isuzu
- Nationality: American

Joe Isuzu was a fictional spokesman who starred in a series of 1980s television advertisements for Isuzu cars and trucks. Created by the ad agency Della Femina, Travisano & Partners, and directed by Hollywood director Graham Baker, the segments aired on American television in 1986–1990, reaching their zenith in 1987 after the character was featured during Super Bowl XXI. Played by actor David Leisure, Joe Isuzu was a pathological liar who made outrageous and overinflated claims about Isuzu's cars, with one commercial even casting him as the Boy Who Cried Wolf. Joe Isuzu's satire of the advertising and automotive sales business met with some resistance within those industries, many of whom felt the character reflected poorly on them.

Joe Isuzu was a major success, causing a significant jump in Isuzu sales the year he was introduced and maintaining those sales in the following years. In an effort to further boost sales and assuage concerns that Joe Isuzu was becoming more famous than the Isuzu vehicles he was trying to sell, Isuzu tweaked the ad campaign to make Joe more honest about Isuzu's benefits, compensating with more assertive sales tactics, such as ambushing salesmen trying to sell other brands by mentioning Isuzu's superior performance to the customer and luring them to Isuzu. In 1991, after stagnating sales, Isuzu fired Della Femina, ending Joe Isuzu's initial run. The campaign was resurrected briefly in 1999 and continued until 2001 to promote several cars such as the Isuzu Axiom. A decade after Isuzu exited the U.S. market, Leisure reprised the role in a 2018 commercial for Johnny5ive, an Isuzu Trooper repairman.

Famous quotes include these:

- "Hi! (...) It's me, Joe Isuzu."
- "You have my word on it."
- "If I'm lying, may lightning hit my mother." ("Good luck, Mom!" appears on screen.)
- "It has more seats than the Astrodome!"
- "Hi, I'm Joe Isuzu and I used my new Isuzu pickup truck to carry a 2,000-pound cheeseburger."
- "The Isuzu Impulse: faster than a speeding—[catches a bullet in his teeth]—well, you know."
- "I swear on my mother's grave the quality of this Isuzu!" cell phone rings "Hello? Oh, hi Mom!"
- "Hi! It's me, Joanne Isuzu, Joe Isuzu's twin sister." (Leisure appears on-screen in drag, with the caption reading "He's lying, and so is she.")
- "Isuzu Trooper II, can hold the whole state of Texas!" ("78.2 cubic feet of it." stated on the bottom of the screen)

== Origin ==
Comedian Jon Lovitz appeared on The Tonight Show Starring Johnny Carson on March 28, 1985 as part of The Groundlings improv troupe doing his character Tommy Flanagan (flah-NAY-gan) who was a pathological liar. He was then hired by Saturday Night Live later that year. The Joe Isuzu commercials started appearing the next year in 1986, leading one to believe it was "borrowed" by the ad company from Lovitz' character.

== Legacy ==
The character became a fixture in American popular culture. In 1988, Michael Dukakis, in a debate with George H. W. Bush during that year's United States presidential election, said, "If Bush keeps it up, he's going to be the Joe Isuzu of American politics."

Leisure reprised his role as Joe Isuzu in a 1992 A&W Cream Soda commercial. True to form, Joe makes outrageous claims about the soda.

In 2012, Daily Finance (a subsidiary of AOL) named David Leisure #15 of Top 25 Celebrity Spokespeople of All Time for having portrayed Joe Isuzu in Isuzu advertisements. The same year, Leisure reprised the role in a series of mock endorsements of Mitt Romney's 2012 presidential campaign.
