= Will Lyons =

British journalist

William Lyons
- Born: 9 May 1976 (age 49); Ascot, United Kingdom
- Education: Bradfield College, Berkshire (Independent boarding school)
- Alma mater: University of Edinburgh; Cardiff University
- Occupations: Journalist; Wine Critic
- Spouse: Kate Wemyss
- Website: will-lyons.com

Will Lyons is a journalist, newspaper columnist, award-winning wine writer and broadcaster. He is most widely known for his writing in The Wall Street Journal and The Sunday Times.

== Education ==
Lyons was educated at Bradfield College, a boarding independent school for boys (now co-educational), in the village of Bradfield in Berkshire, followed by the University of Edinburgh, from which he holds a MA. He studied journalism at Cardiff School of Journalism, Media and Cultural Studies.

== Journalism career ==
Lyons began his career in journalism in 2002 as a reporter for The Scotsman where he held a number of different positions including Diarist, Consumer Affairs Correspondent, Features Writer and Business Correspondent. In 2005 he moved to Scotland on Sunday, as Arts Correspondent and Wine Columnist (2005–2006). Later Business Correspondent and Wine Columnist (2006–2009). In 2010 Lyons joined The Wall Street Journal in London.

He has formerly written regular columns for Reader's Digest, The Spectator Business, The Law Society Gazette and features for Jamie Magazine, Decanter, Waitrose Thirst and The Pulse.

== Career in Wine ==
Lyons was President of the Edinburgh University Wine Society while an undergraduate at Edinburgh in the 1990s. His introduction to wine tasting came in his penultimate year at Bradfield College where he was a member of the wine-tasting society La Confrerie an experience he later described as "a surprisingly serious approach to wine for a seventeen year old."

After graduation, Lyons worked as a wine merchant for Justerini & Brooks in Edinburgh before moving to London with the company in 2000. It was while working for Justerini & Brooks in St James's street that Lyons received the opportunity to sell and taste a great many fine and rare wines particularly Bordeaux and Burgundy. Lyons has said that it was during this period that he developed a deep love of the classic wines of France. He later worked at Lea & Sandeman where he was introduced to the quality of individual grower Champagne and Italian wine. And was fine wine advisor for Berry Bros. & Rudd.

Lyons began writing about wine in the late 1990s when he was commissioned to write for Decanter while still working at Justerini & Brooks. In 2001 Lyons left the wine trade and studied journalism at Cardiff University following which he joined The Scotsman in 2002. After holding several positions at The Scotsman in 2005 Lyons moved to Scotland on Sunday as Wine Columnist for the newspaper.

In October 2009 he was approached by The Wall Street Journal to join as a Wine Columnist and staff writer. In 2015 he was approached by The Sunday Times to write a wine column. He has been described as the best wine critic of his generation and was named as one of the top 12 fine wine purchasing influencers.

In 2013 he co-authored 'Reds, Whites & Varsity Blues: 60 Years of the Oxford & Cambridge Blind Wine-Tasting Competition', along with a number of wine writers including Hugh Johnson, Jancis Robinson, Robert Parker Jr. and Oz Clarke. In which he recalls his experiences blind-wine tasting at Edinburgh University. In February 2013 he captained a Press v Trade team at the Oxford-v-Cambridge 60th anniversary blind wine tasting competition run by Pol Roger Champagne.

In 2014 he co-authored Selecting, Drinking, Collecting & Obsessing A Wall Street Journal Guide to Wine with fellow WSJ wine columnist Lettie Teague.

In 2018 he was appointed Vice President of The Sunday Times Wine Club.

== Selected publications ==
Reds, Whites & Varsity Blues: 60 Years of the Oxford & Cambridge Blind Wine-Tasting Competition 'Toasting the Auld Alliance: Edinburgh v St Andrews' (2013 Pavilion) ISBN 978-1-909108-28-8

Selecting, Drinking, Collecting & Obsessing A Wall Street Journal Guide to Wine by Will Lyons & Lettie Teague (WSJ 2014)

== Awards ==
In 2022 Wine Times was named Podcast of the Year at the British Media Awards. In 2016 he was shortlisted for ‘Wine Communicator of the Year 2016’. 2015, 2014 and 2010 Lyons's wine column in The Wall Street Journal was shortlisted for International Columnist of the Year in the Louis Roederer Writers Awards. In 2008, Lyons won the Louis Roederer Writers Awards' Regional Wine Writer, having been runner-up for the award in 2006 and 2009. In 2006 he was shortlisted for The Glenfiddich Wine Writer of the Year. In 2013 Lyons was named by The Spectator magazine as Cigar Writer of the Year for his writing in The Wall Street Journal. In 2008 and 2009, he was one of the shortlist, but unplaced, for the Scottish Press Awards' Financial Business Journalist.

== See also ==
- List of wine personalities
