= Ron Ramin =

American composer

Ronald "Ron" Ramin (born 1953 in New York City) is an American composer for television, film, and concert music. He has composed musical scores for more than 250 hours of U.S. network television programming, including 20 prime-time television series and more than 30 original movies and miniseries. Ramin is now focused primarily on concert music composition.

Ramin is the son of composer and orchestrator Sid Ramin.

== Early life and education ==
Ramin was born and raised in New York City. He earned his undergraduate degree (A.B. Music) from Princeton University, where he studied privately with composer Milton Babbitt. During his time at Princeton, he composed music for the university's musical comedy troupe, the Princeton Triangle Club.

After graduation, Ramin moved to Los Angeles to pursue a career as a film composer. He continued his musical education by studying privately with Albert Harris and Anthony Vazzana (composition and orchestration) and William Kettering (conducting).

== Television and film career ==
Ramin began his career composing for television and film. His thematic and orchestral approach to scoring earned him recognition throughout the industry. He has been presented with both BMI and ASCAP Film & Television Awards at their annual dinners.

In 1994, Ramin was nominated for a Primetime Emmy Award in the category Outstanding Individual Achievement in Music Composition for a Series (dramatic underscore) for his work on the pilot episode of Christy. At the 18th CableACE Awards in 1996, he was awarded the prize in the category Best Original Score for his work on Disney Channel's Rent-a-Kid.

=== Selected television and film credits ===
Television Series:

- Fantasy Island (ABC)
- Hart to Hart (ABC)
- The Fall Guy (ABC)
- Cagney & Lacey (CBS)
- The New Twilight Zone (CBS)
- Crazy Like a Fox (CBS)
- The New Mike Hammer (CBS)
- Knots Landing (CBS)
- The Trials of Rosie O'Neill (CBS)
- Christy (CBS)
- Walker, Texas Ranger (CBS)

Television Films and Movies:

- Frog (PBS)
- Stranger on My Land (ABC)
- The Diamond Trap (CBS)
- Mike Hammer: Murder Takes All (CBS)
- Menu for Murder (CBS)
- Posing: Inspired by Three Real Stories (ABC)
- Memories of Midnight (syndication)
- They've Taken Our Children: The Chowchilla Kidnapping (ABC)
- The Birds II: Land's End (Showtime)
- Bionic Ever After? (CBS)
- Come Die with Me: A Mickey Spillane's Mike Hammer Mystery (CBS)
- From the Mixed-Up Files of Mrs. Basil E. Frankweiler (ABC)
- Cagney & Lacey: The View Through the Glass Ceiling (CBS)
- Rent-a-Kid (Disney Channel)
- Dare to Love (ABC)
- Cagney & Lacey: True Convictions (CBS)
- Terror in the Family (Fox)
- My Son Is Innocent (NBC)
- A Step Toward Tomorrow (CBS)
- Fatal Error (TBS)
- Dogmatic (ABC)
- Cruel Justice (Fox)
- Christy: Return to Cutter Gap (Pax)
- Falling in Love with the Girl Next Door (Hallmark)
- Meltdown: Days of Destruction (Sci-Fi Channel)
- Home by Christmas (Lifetime)
- My Neighbor's Keeper (Lifetime)
- Lost Holiday: The Jim & Suzanne Shemwell Story (Lifetime)
- Charlie & Me (Hallmark)
- Lost Behind Bars (Lifetime)

== Concert music career ==
In 2014, Ramin shifted his focus from television and film scoring to concert music composition. His symphonic suite Golden State of Mind (2017) depicts the beauty and drama of the California landscape and the diversity of its people in three movements: "Yosemite," "San Andreas," and "Olvera Street."

The first movement, originally titled "Greetings!," received its world premiere performance by the Marin Symphony conducted by Music Director Alasdair Neale in September 2014, at the symphony's annual outdoor concert.

=== SEVENTEEN ===
Following the 2018 school shooting in Parkland, Florida, Ramin collaborated with librettist Portia Kamons to create SEVENTEEN, an artistic response to gun violence in America. The work focuses on young people channeling their grief and anger into activism, highlighting youth leadership on issues of racial, social and economic justice, environmental concerns, and mental health.

SEVENTEEN received its world premiere in November 2024 with the Orlando Philharmonic Orchestra, conducted by music director Eric Jacobsen. Jamie Bernstein directed the young on-stage narrators in its initial performance.

== Personal life ==
Ramin has been married to journalist and author Cathryn Jakobson Ramin since 1988. They have two adult sons and reside in Northern California. Ramin also spends considerable time in both Los Angeles and New York City.

== Professional affiliations ==
Ramin is a former board member of the Society of Composers & Lyricists (SCL) and is currently a writer and publisher member of ASCAP.

== Awards and recognition ==
- 1994: Primetime Emmy Award nomination for Outstanding Individual Achievement in Music Composition for a Series (dramatic underscore) for Christy
- 1996: CableACE Award for Best Original Score for Rent-a-Kid
- Multiple BMI Film & TV Awards
- ASCAP Film & Television Award
