= Cathryn Jakobson Ramin =

American journalist and author

Cathryn Jakobson Ramin is an American journalist, investigative reporter, and author. She has written for publications such as The New York Times Magazine, New York Magazine, O, the Oprah Magazine, Discover, Craftsmanship Quarterly, Aeon, NewYorker.com and More (magazine). To date, she has published two books, Crooked: Outwitting the Back Pain Industry and Getting on the Road to Recovery (2017, HarperCollins), and Carved in Sand: When Attention Fails and Memory Fades in Midlife (2007, HarperCollins), which became a ''New York Times'' bestseller.

== Early life and career ==
Ramin (who uses the unhyphenated last name “Jakobson Ramin”) was born in New York City. She graduated from Scarsdale High School in 1974, then went on to earn a B.A. in theater and psychology from Tufts University in 1978.

Ramin remained in Boston after college. She began her career as a writer and photographer at a monthly tabloid trade journal, The New England Fashion Retailer, starting in 1978. She then worked as an assistant editor at Inc. Magazine until 1981, when she moved to Manhattan. In New York she worked as a writer and editor for Barron's and Money, and freelanced for New York Magazine and The New York Times Magazine, among many others. On a trip to Los Angeles to report a story, she met Ron Ramin, at that time, a composer for television and movies. She moved to LA in 1987, and she and Ron Ramin were married in 1988. In 1998, the family moved to northern California with their two sons.

== Career in journalism ==
After a year of writing feature stories and shooting pictures for The New England Fashion Retailer, she was hired by Inc. Magazine in Boston to write and edit a section of the magazine called "Ideas You Can Use." Shortly, she began writing business features for the magazine.

After she returned to New York City in 1981, she worked for Money magazine and then for Barron's, as a writer and editor. She also contributed articles to many other consumer magazines. Her most well-known piece from that period is a 1986 cover story for New York Magazine called “The New Orthodox.”

In Los Angeles, she wrote features for the Los Angeles Times Magazine, and a biweekly column for the Los Angeles Herald-Examiner. The column, called "Connecting" in a pre-Internet era, explored issues affecting the personal lives of people in that city.

In 2004, she published “In Search of Lost Time,” in The New York Times Magazine, a prequel to her book on memory and attention.

In 2006, she published “Valley of the Dulls,” an article about the adverse cognitive effects of antidepressants and anti-anxiety drugs, in O, the Oprah Magazine. In 2013, after receiving a grant from the Fund for Investigative Journalism, she published an investigative report on the drug compounding industry, “The Hormone Hoax” in More (magazine), which has helped alter public policy in the field of women's health.

== Career as an author ==
Ramin’s book Crooked: Outwitting the Back Pain Industry and Getting on the Road to Recovery, was published in May 2017. "Though Ramin asserts that she knew very little about the back-pain industry when she began her research, she soon realized that she was delving into a checkered subject with ‘twists, turns and corrupt characters’ worthy of a Le Carré novel," wrote Publishers Weekly.

Ramin's first book, Carved in Sand, is about what happens to the brain in middle age. She chose to address this topic because in her 40s, she observed changes in her own memory (and those of her peers) that concerned her. The book appeared on The New York Times bestseller list in April 2007. Ramin was interviewed on Talk of the Nation, The Leonard Lopate Show, Michael Krasny's Forum and several other public radio affiliate stations.

From Publishers Weekly: "In her first book, veteran journalist Ramin turns herself into a guinea pig as she seeks ways to restore her own failing memory and growing inability to concentrate. Looking at a wide variety of genetic, biochemical and environmental factors that slow the connections among the brain's 100 billion neurons, especially in the hippocampus, Ramin undertakes 10 interventions, methods of achieving her cognitive enhancement. She logs the ups and downs of medications such as Adderall and Provigil; she looks at dietary supplements and biofeedback. … Overall, the variety of perspectives and the wealth of scientific information Ramin provides, as well as her warm personal style, will reward readers and may help them stay mentally sharp."

== Awards and recognition ==
Ramin has spoken before audiences including physicians at the Hospital for Special Surgery in New York City, scientists at the George Institute for Global Health in Sydney, Australia, the Feldenkrais Institute in New York City, the Commonwealth Club in San Francisco, the Bay Area Book Festival in Berkeley, the American Bankers Association, the 92nd Street Y in New York, the Harmonie Club of New York, the Society of the Four Arts, the Christamore House Guild and the Inner Circle of Advocates.

Ramin is a member of the Association of Health Care Journalists, the National Association of Science Writers, the Authors Guild and the Journalism and Women Symposium. In 2013, she was awarded a grant by the Fund for Investigative Journalism. She is also a MacDowell Colony fellow, a fellow at the Virginia Center for the Creative Arts, and an Emeritus member of The San Francisco Writers’ Grotto.

== Selected works ==
- Crooked: Outwitting the Back Pain Industry and Getting on the Road to Recovery. HarperCollins. 2017. ISBN 9780062641786.
- Carved in Sand: When Attention Fails and Memory Fades in Midlife. HarperCollins. 2007. ISBN 9780060598709.
