= Jerry Della Femina =

American advertising executive (born 1936)

- Born: Gennaro Tomas Della Femina; July 22, 1936 (age 90); Brooklyn, New York
- Occupation: Advertising executive
- Known for: "Madman" advertising personality
- Notable work: From Those Wonderful Folks Who Gave You Pearl Harbor (1969)
- Spouse: Judy Licht

Jerry Della Femina (born 1936) is an American advertising executive and restaurateur. Starting from a poor Italian background in Brooklyn, he eventually became chairman of Della Femina Travisano & Partners, an agency which he founded with Ron Travisano in the 1960s. Over the next two decades they grew the company into a major advertising house that was billing $250 million per year and had 300 employees and offices in both New York and Los Angeles. Della Femina is known for his larger-than-life personality and colorful language, and was referred to as a "'Madman' of Madison Avenue". In 1970, he wrote a book about the advertising industry, humorously titled, From Those Wonderful Folks Who Gave You Pearl Harbor: Front-Line Dispatches from the Advertising War. The book became a best-seller, described by The Guardian as "one of the defining books about advertising", and eventually inspired the television series Mad Men.

== Early life and career ==
Della Femina was born into a working-class family in Coney Island, Brooklyn. His father, Michael, was a composing room employee for The New York Times. Della Femina graduated from Lafayette High School and attended one year of night school at Brooklyn College. In 1952, at age 16, he worked as a delivery boy for the Ruthruff and Ryan advertising agency. He also worked at The New York Times as a messenger boy, dropping off proofs at advertising agencies. He tried unsuccessfully in 1954 to get into advertising himself and was repeatedly rejected until in 1961, when he landed a job as a copyeditor at Daniel & Charles, then worked through multiple other agencies. He worked for two and a half years at Delehanty, Kurnit & Geller, and then became a creative supervisor at Ted Bates Advertising.

== Career ==
In 1967, he started his own agency, Della Femina Travisano & Partners, founding it with Ron Travisano, an advertising supervisor he had met while working as a copyeditor at Delehanty, Kurnit & Geller. Della Femina owned one-third, Travisano owned one-third, and the rest was distributed among two other partners whom they had known from DKG and had followed them to Ted Bates Advertising. Della Femina was chairman, and Travisano was vice-chairman and co-director of creative services. Their first account was for Squire, a company that made hairpieces, and they came up with an ad, "Are you still combing your memories?" In 1970, they won their first major account, for Blue Nun Wine, and came up with a campaign that used the talents of comics Jerry Stiller and Anne Meara.

The agency was also known for its work on Isuzu (creating the fictional spokesman Joe Isuzu), Beck's Beer, Chemical Bank, Dow Brands (Fingerman), and Pan Am. Their most famous campaign was the Meow Mix Theme, conceived by Ron Travisano and composed by David Lucas of Lucas/McFaul, which featured an apparent singing cat. In 1981, they won the account for the New York Mets, marking the first time a Major League Baseball team had hired an ad agency. By 1985, when Travisano sold his shares and left the agency, they had around 300 employees in New York and Los Angeles were still privately held and were billing approximately $250 million annually.

Della Femina sold the agency in 1986 to a British group, WCRS, for a reported $30 million USD, though he continued working at the company. WCRS was then sold to a French ad agency group, Eurocom. Della Femina was not happy with the loss of control, left in June 1992, and started a new agency, Jerry, Inc., in December of that year. Accounts included the New York Mets, Newsweek, Marvel Comics, and Financial Security Assurance. He merged it in May 1994 with the New York office of Ketchum Advertising, forming Jerry & Ketchum, with new clients including North Shore University Hospital. The name later changed to Della Femina/Jeary and Partners.

He ran a restaurant, Della Femina, in East Hampton, and NYC (53rd Park & Lex) until he sold it in early 2011. He also co-published the regional weekly newspaper The Independent based in East Hampton, New York. and has since sold it.

== Personal life ==
Della Femina has been married to journalist and television host Judy Licht since 1983. They met in 1981 when she interviewed him for Channel 5.

He received honorary doctorates from the University of Missouri in 1983 and from Long Island University in 1989. Advertising Age named him one of the "100 most influential advertising people of the century".

== Books ==
- Jerry Della Femina (1970). From Those Wonderful Folks Who Gave You Pearl Harbor: Front Line Dispatches from the Advertising War (First ed.). Simon & Schuster. ISBN 0671205714.
- Jerry Della Femina (1978). An Italian Grows in Brooklyn (1st ed.). Little, Brown. ISBN 0316179914.
