= Ramin, Punjab =

Coordinates: 26°31′N 65°16′E

Ramin
- Town and union council
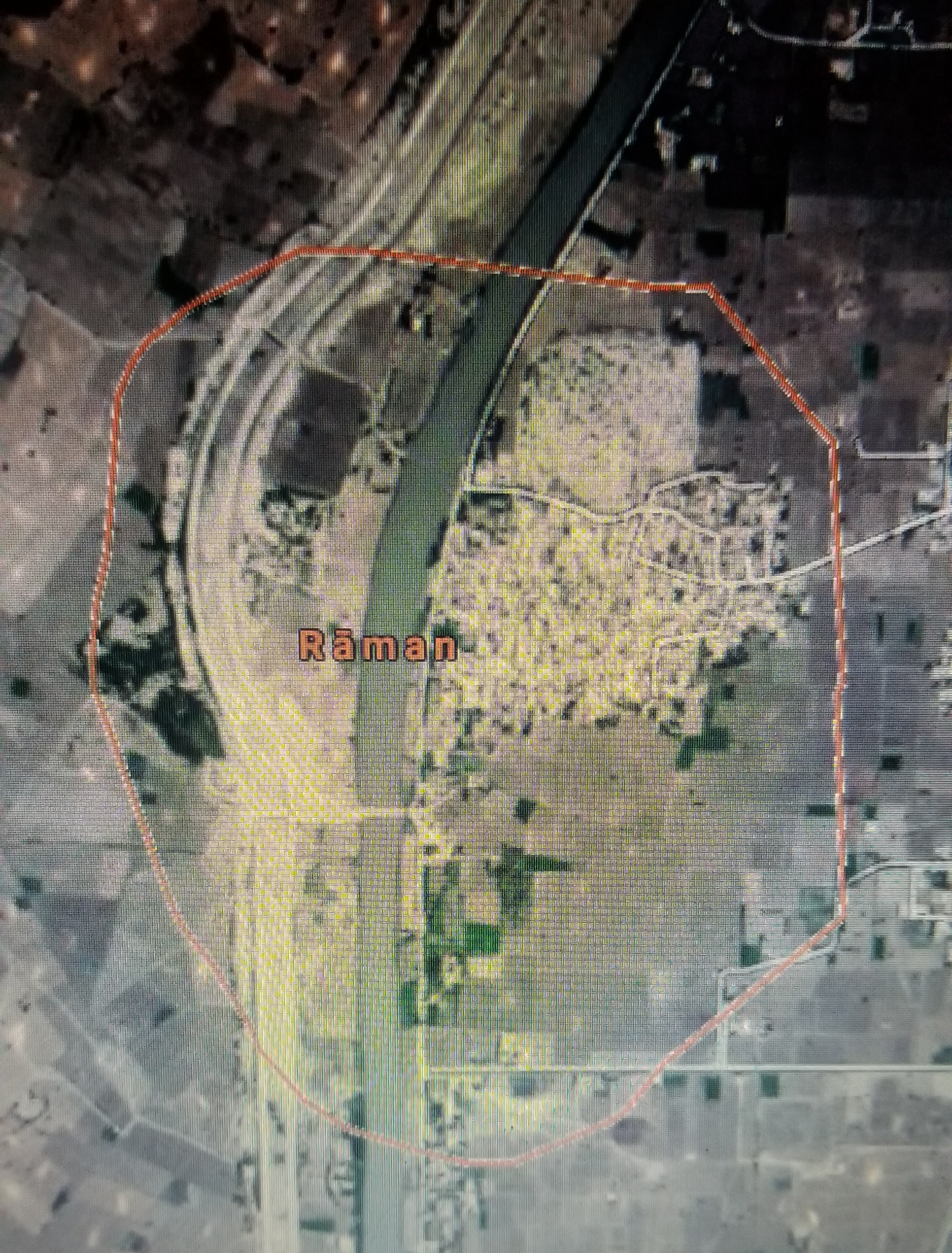
- Satellite view
- Interactive map of Ramin
- Country: Pakistan
- Region: Punjab
- District: Dera Ghazi Khan District
- Tehsil: Dera Ghazi Khan Tehsil
- Time zone: UTC+5 (PST)

Ramin or Rāman is a town and union council of Dera Ghazi Khan District in the Punjab province of Pakistan.

== History ==
Long ago the Thingani Balouchs, a sub-tribe of the Marri Balouchs from Balochistan, migrated to the western valley of the Indus River. The Thingani tribe has ruled Rāman for many years. The well-known Sardars of Rāman were Sardar Jamak Khan Thingani (Jamak-I) and his grandsons Sardar Jamak Khan Thingani (Jamak-II) and Sardar Gulzar Khan Thingani.

Sardar Jamak Khan Thingani (Jamak-II) had four sons:

- Sardar Qurban Hussain Khan Thingani
- Sardar Qadir Bakhsh Khan Thingani
- Sardar Usman Khan Thingani
- Sardar Siddique Khan Thingani

The second Sardar, Sardar Gulzar Khan Thingani, also had four sons:

- Sardar Ghulam Hassan Khan Thingani (Surname: Namazi)
- Sardar Ghulam Hussain Khan Thingani (Numbardar)
- Sardar Atta Muhammad Khan Thingani
- Sardar Durr Muhammad Khan Thingani

These days the most stable Thingani family in Rāman is the Jamakani family which descended from Sardar Jamak Khan Thingani (Jamak-I), Sardar Jamak Khan Thingani (Jamak-I) was grandfather of Sardar Jamak Khan Thingani (Jamak-II) and Sardar Gulzar Khan Thingani. The Thingani family descended from Sardar Jamak Khan Thingani (Jamak-I) has ruled the town of Rāman for many years.

The main ruling tribe in Rāman is the Thingani tribe.
