= Glenn Kramon =

American journalist

- Born: Glenn Kramon; May 25, 1953 (age 73)
- Status: married
- Occupation: Assistant Managing Editor for The New York Times
- Notable credit(s): The New York Times, The San Francisco Examiner, The Kansas City Star

Glenn Kramon (born May 25, 1953) is an American journalist who has served as an assistant managing editor of The New York Times in a career of almost four decades at the news organization. He is also a lecturer at Stanford Business School who received the students' Distinguished Teaching Award in 2020.

== Career ==
Glenn Kramon started his journalism career in 1975 at The Kansas City Star after graduating from Stanford University. In 1977, he joined The San Francisco Examiner where he held various positions including business editor, Sunday news editor and reporter. In 1987, Kramon joined The Times as a copy editor and health care reporter. Soon after, he held the positions of assignment editor, technology editor, enterprise editor, Sunday business editor and deputy business editor. He went on to become the paper's Business editor, overseeing the paper's financial news staff, from 1997 to 2003. In 2003, UCLA's Gerald Loeb Award honored Kramon by bestowing upon him the Lawrence Minard Editor Award, recognizing an outstanding editor who does not receive a byline. In his current role as an assistant managing editor, he oversees long-form projects "with a mandate to stimulate and manage original New York Times reporting ventures across the newsroom."

== Awards ==
In addition to receiving the Minard Editor Award, Kramon has supervised and edited reporters who have won nine Pulitzer Prizes, and have been finalists for the Pulitzer 24 times. They have also earned a number of other honors including nine George Polk awards for courageous journalism, seven Gerald Loeb Awards for distinguished business journalism, the Goldsmith Prize for Investigative Reporting and the Grantham Prize for environmental reporting.
