= Scarsdale Public Schools =

School district in New York, United States

Scarsdale Union Free School District

Location
- Scarsdale, Westchester County, New York, 10583; United States

District information
- Type: Public
- Motto: Non Sibi (Not for One's Self)
- Grades: K–12
- Established: 1784
- Superintendent: Dr. Andrew (Drew) Patrick, Ed.D.
- Asst. superintendent(s): Andrew Lennon (Business); Dr. Edgar McIntosh (Curriculum, Instruction, and Assessment); Eric Rauschenbach (Special Education and Student Services); Meghan Troy (Human Resources and Leadership Development)
- School board: Ronald Schulhof, President (2022–25); Suzie Hahn, Vice President (2022–25); Colleen Brown (2022–25); James Dugan (2021–24); Robert Klein (2023–26); Jessica Resnick-Ault (2021–24); Amber Yusuf (2023–26)
- Accreditation(s): Middle States Association of Colleges and Schools (Scarsdale High School)
- Schools: Edgewood Elementary School; Fox Meadow Elementary School; Greenacres Elementary School; Heathcote Elementary School; Quaker Ridge Elementary School; Scarsdale Middle School; Scarsdale Senior High School
- Budget: $166,862,755 (2021–22)
- NCES District ID: 3625950

Students and staff
- Students: 4,642 (2021–22)
- Teachers: 411 full-time equivalent (2021–22)
- Student–teacher ratio: 11:1
- District mascot: Bandersnatch; Team Name: Raiders
- Colors: Maroon; White

Other information
- Website: scarsdaleschools.org

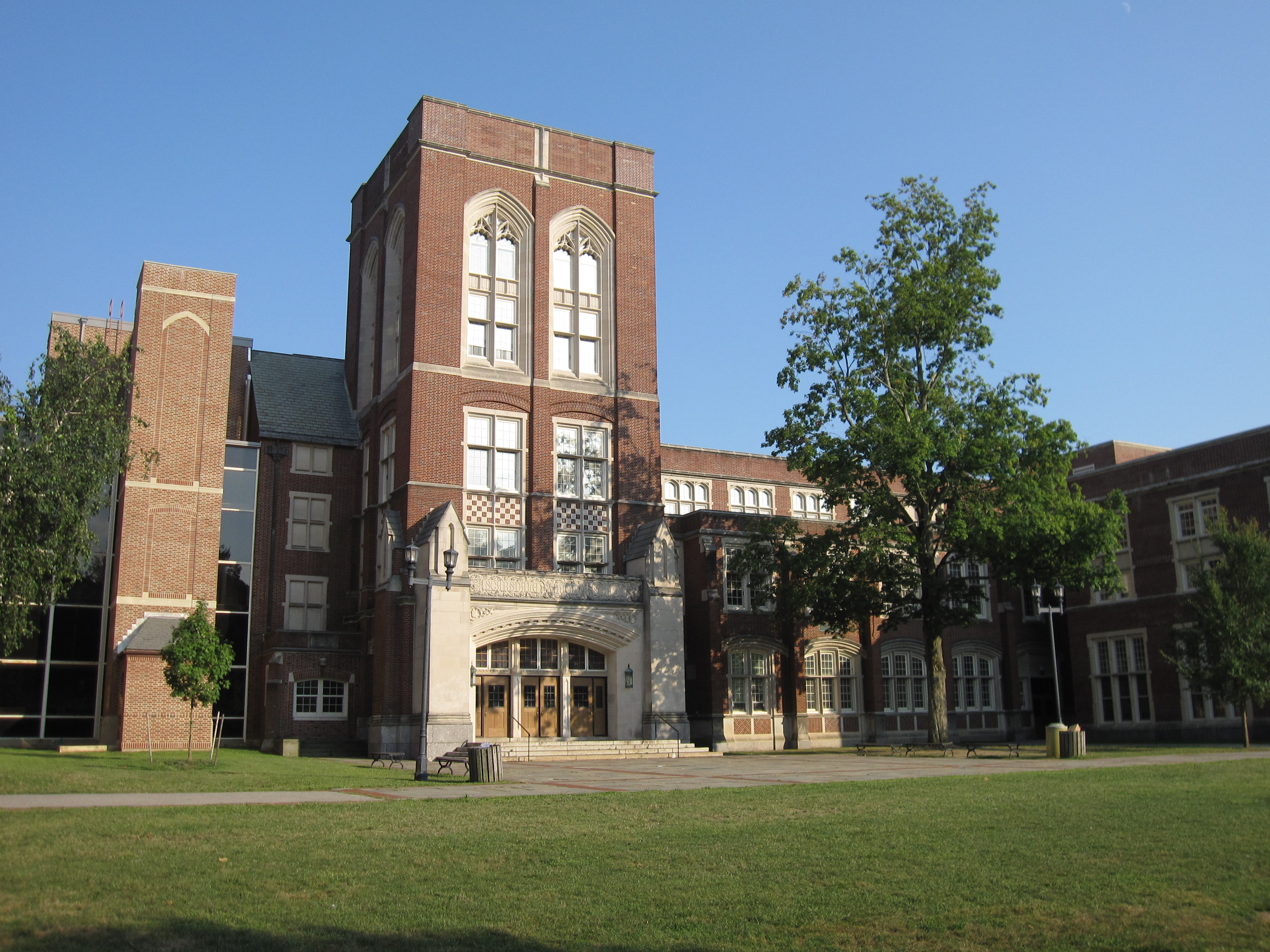
Scarsdale High School

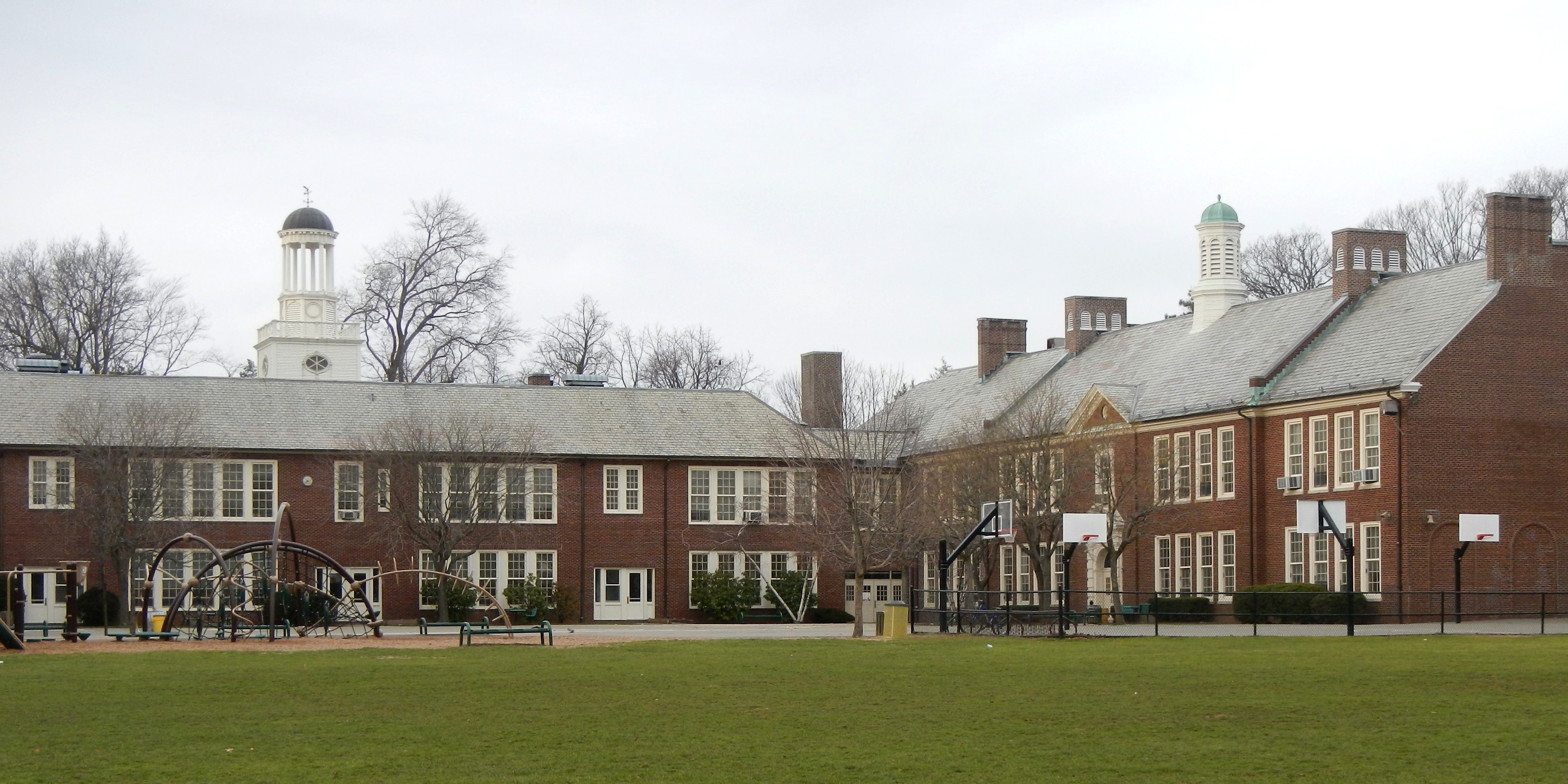
Edgewood School

The Scarsdale Public School District (Scarsdale Union Free School District) is a public school district whose boundaries encompass the entirety of Scarsdale, New York and part of the unincorporated portion of the town of Mamaroneck, New York. The district enrollment is 4,593 students in grades K–12 in seven schools. More than 90% of K–12 aged children residing in the village attend the public schools.

The average class size is around 20 students with a 97% student attendance rate. The district is in good standing under the Every Student Succeeds Act, or ESSA.

In June 2012, 24/7 Wall St. ranked the district as being the wealthiest in the entire country.

Three of the district's schools have received the National Blue Ribbon Award including Greenacres Elementary in 2023, Heathcote Elementary in 2020, and Scarsdale High in 1983.

== Demographics ==
As of 2019, enrollment by gender is split 51% male and 49% female.

65% of students are white, 20% are Asian or Native Hawaiian/other Pacific Islander, 7% are Hispanic or Latino, 6% are Multicultural, and 1% are African American.

As of 1991, students of East Asian origin made up 19.3% of the school district's students. That year 26% of the students at Fox Meadow Elementary School were of Asian origin, Over 25% of the students at another one of the elementary schools were of Asian origin. The increase was chiefly due to a large number of Japanese businesspersons assigned to the New York City area moving to Scarsdale, and also due to a large number of houses being occupied by "empty nesters". Fox Meadow adjusted to its new population by giving new Japanese students American "buddies," establishing English-Japanese handbooks, and a parent-teacher association group oriented to Japanese parents.

== Student performance ==
As of that year SAT averages of the school system are over 100 points higher than the national average. In 2007 the SAT averages were 639 for mathematics, 617 for reading, and 636 on writing. The national averages were 505 for mathematics, 491 for reading, and 494 for writing. In 2006 there were 364 graduates from Scarsdale High School. Of them, almost 97% were scheduled to attend four-year universities. Elsa Brenner of The New York Times wrote that "The school system remains tough to beat and is clearly doing all it can to stay that way."

== Schools ==
The Scarsdale School District has five separate elementary schools: Edgewood, Fox Meadow, Greenacres, Heathcote, and Quaker Ridge.

Each elementary school is named after one of the five neighborhoods in Scarsdale.

Scarsdale Middle School is the district middle school and Scarsdale High School is the district high school.
