= Greg M. Behrman =

American businessman

Greg Behrman is the founder and CEO of NationSwell.

NationSwell is a digital media company focused on American renewal. The team identifies the new American innovators and pioneers who are doing the most creative and impactful things to move our country forward, produces great stories about them, and drives social action in support of their efforts.

He is also the Founder & Director of The CT Heroes Project – a new initiative focused on combating homelessness amongst veterans in Connecticut.

Behrman returned in the spring of 2012 from a one-year military deployment to Afghanistan where he was a Strategic Advisor first to Gen. David Petraeus and then to Gen. John Allen. Prior to his deployment, Behrman was a Member of the Policy Planning Staff at the US Department of State from 2008 to 2011.

Behrman was formerly the Henry Kissinger Fellow at The Aspen Institute and was also a Fellow at The Carr Center for Human Rights at Harvard University. In between college and graduate school, he worked for two years at Goldman Sachs in the firm’s private equity group. He graduated magna cum laude with a BA from Princeton University and with an M.Phil from Oxford University.

== Published works ==
He is the author of The Most Noble Adventure: The Story of the Marshall Plan and The Time When America Helped to Save Europe (Simon & Schuster, 2007) and The Invisible People (Simon & Schuster, 2004) about the US response to the global AIDS pandemic.

== Personal life ==
He lives in Fairfield, Connecticut with his wife Caitlin, his daughter Claire and his son Tyler.
