= Stephen Douglas Mumford =

American author

Stephen Douglas Mumford (born 1942) is an American author on fertility and population growth.

== Education ==
Mumford was born on August 28, 1942, in Louisville, Kentucky. He did his undergraduate studies in agriculture at the University of Kentucky, graduating in 1966. He then earned a master's degree from the University of Texas School of Public Health in 1971 and finished a doctorate from the same institution in 1975.

== Career ==
From 1977 to 1983 he worked as a scientist and research group leader with the International Fertility Research Program in Research Triangle Park, North Carolina. Since 1984 he has been president of the Center for Research on Population and Security, also located in Research Triangle Park.

== Positions on abortion and sterilization ==
In 1978, Mumford testified before the United States Congress that he believed world population growth, and immigration to the U.S. driven by population growth, to be national security issues that should be addressed by the U.S. military. He has advocated the reduction of birth rates in developing countries by large-scale abortion, and by drug-induced permanent mass sterilization, and has been involved in the international distribution of quinacrine to developing countries for sterilizing women there. He has strongly criticized the Roman Catholic Church for its opposition to population control, abortion and contraception.
