= Burman =

Burman is a surname. Notable people with the surname include:

- Anand Burman (born 1952), Indian businessman
- Anneli Burman (born 1963), Swedish female curler
- Bari Dreiband-Burman, American make-up artist
- Barney Burman, American makeup artist
- Barry Burman (1943–2001), English artist
- Bartłomiej Burman (born 2001), Polish footballer
- Barun Burman (born 1954), Indian cricketer
- Ben Lucien Burman (1895–1984), American writer
- Bob Burman (1884–1916), American racing driver
- Bonnie Kantor-Burman, American official in Ohio
- Brenda Burman (born 1967), American lawyer and government official
- Carina Burman (born 1960), Swedish novelist and literary scholar
- Chila Kumari Burman, British artist
- Daniel Burman (born 1973), Argentine film director and producer
- Ellis Burman (1902–1974), American make-up artist and sculptor
- Ellis Burman Jr. (1935–2020), American special make-up effects artist, son of the above
- Erica Burman (born 1960), British psychologist
- Erik Burman (1897–1985), Swedish ice hockey player
- Fale Burman (1903–1973), Swedish Army officer
- George Burman (born 1942), American football player
- Ingrid Burman (born 1952), Swedish politician
- Jayasri Burman (born 1960), Indian artist, niece of Sakti
- Jens Burman (born 1994), Swedish cross-country skier
- Joe Burman (1898–1979), American boxer
- Johannes Burman (1707–1780), Dutch botanist
- John Burman (1867–1941), English journalist and politician
- John Burman (cricketer) (1838–1900), English cricketer
- Karl Burman (1882–1965), Estonian architect and painter
- Kaushik Burman, Indian engineer and business executive
- Lars Burman (born 1958), Swedish literature academic, husband of Carina Burman
- Leonard Burman (born 1953), American economist
- Lucy Burman (1922–2004), American writer and communist activist
- Mark Burman (born 1984), New Zealand rugby union footballer
- Maya Burman (born 1971), French artist, daughter of Sakti Burman
- Meera Dev Burman (1912–2007), Indian lyricist and musician, wife of S. D. Burman
- Megha Burman, Indian actress
- Mohit Burman (born 1968), Indian businessman
- Molly Burman (born 2001), English musician
- Nabadwipchandra Dev Burman (1854–1931), Indian sitarist and singer, father of S. D. Burman
- Nicolaas Laurens Burman (1734–1793), Dutch botanist, son of Johannes Burman
- Paul Burman (1888–1934), Estonian painter, brother of Karl Burman
- Pauli Burman (1933–2012), Finnish politician
- Peter Burman (born 1944), British architectural historian
- Pieter Burman the Elder (1668–1741), Dutch classical scholar
- Pieter Burman the Younger (1713-1778), Dutch lawyer and philologist, nephew of the above
- Proctor Burman (1893–1974), English figure skater
- Red Burman (James Clarence Burman; 1915–1996), American boxer
- Ron Burman (born 1965), American music executive
- R. D. Burman (1939–1994), Indian musician, son of S. D. Burman
- S. D. Burman (1906–1975), Indian singer and composer
- Saket Burman (born 1976/7), British billionaire
- Sakti Burman (born 1935), Indian painter and sculptor
- Sandip Burman (born 1969), Indian tabla player
- Shirley Burman (born 1934), American photographer
- Sidharth Burman (1944/5–2015), Indian billionaire businessman
- Simon Burman (born 1965), English footballer
- Thomas Burman (sculptor) (1618–1674), English sculptor
- Thomas R. Burman (born 1940), American make-up artist
- Tom Burman (born 1966), American athletics administrator
- Tony Burman (born 1948), Canadian journalist
- Tony Burman (footballer) (born 1958), English footballer and manager
- Patrik Burman (born 1968), Swedish wheelchair curler
- William Francis Burman (1897–1974), British army sergeant, recipient of the Victoria Cross

== See also ==
- Barman (surname)
- Berman, surname
- Burmann, surname
- Buurman, surname
- Burman and Sons Ltd, UK manufacturer of automotive steering gear
- Bamar, dominant ethnic group of Burma, sometimes called Burman
- Tibeto-Burman languages, linguistic subfamily of the proposed Sino-Tibetan language family
- Variant of the Indian title and surname Varma
- Berman
