= Varma (surname) =

Varma and Verma are surnames found in India and Southeast Asia. These surnames are commonly used by people of different castes and ethnic groups across the region. In India, the surname is used in the northern half of the country by Kayasthas, Jats, Rajputs, Koches, Kurmis, and Koeris.

== Indian traditional usage ==
According to Ayodhya Prasad Sah, the title was also used by some Brahmins in parts of Odisha, although it is recommended historically for the Kshatriyas.

== Notable people ==
Notable people with the surname "Varma" or its variants include:

=== Burman ===
- Anand Ashok Chand Burman, Indian billionaire businessman
- Sidharth Burman, Indian businessman
- Saket Burman, British billionaire
- Mohit Burman, Indian businessman
- Megha Burman, Indian actress
- Jayasri Burman, Indian contemporary artist

=== Dev Burman ===
- Nabadwipchandra Dev Burman, from the Tripura royal family; Indian Sitarist and Dhrupad singer
- Rahul Dev Burman, Indian music composer and singer, son of Sachin Dev Burman
- Sachin Dev Burman, Indian music composer and singer belonged to the Tripura royal family
- Somdev Devvarman, Indian tennis star
- Meera Dev Burman, Indian film lyricist and musician

=== Varma ===
- Amshu Varma, Nepalese Lichchhavi King
- Aneesh Varma, British-American Entrepreneur of Indian origin
- Indira Varma, British actress of Indian origin
- Jagannatha Varma, Indian(Malayalam) actor From Kerala
- Mahadevi Varma, Indian(Hindi) poet from Uttar Pradesh
- Maharishi Mahesh Yogi, Founder of Transcendental Meditation (birth surname)
- Manasi Varma Indian television actress
- Marthanda Varma, Founder of the Kingdom of Travancore, now part of Kerala
- Prakash Varma, Indian filmmaker from Kerala
- Prince Rama Varma, Indian classical musician From Kerala
- Raja Ravi Varma, Indian painter from Kerala
- Ram Gopal Varma, Indian(Bollywood) filmmaker from Andhra Pradesh
- Rama Varma IX, Maharaja of Kingdom of Cochin, now part of Kerala
- Ravi Varma (East Godavari actor), Indian actor from Andhra Pradesh
- Samyuktha Varma, Indian(Malayalam) actress from Kerala
- Shabareesh Varma, Indian(Malayalam) lyricist, Singer from Kerala
- Shreekumar Varma, Indian writer from Kerala
- Shyamji Krishna Varma, Indian revolutionary fighter, lawyer and journalist from Gujarat
- Vayalar Ramavarma (1928–1975), Indian (Malayalam) poet and songwriter from Kerala

=== Varman ===
- Varman dynasty (4–7 c.), a dynasty of Kamarupa, including a list of rulers
- Suryavarman II, Great King of the Khmer Empire and builder of Angkor Wat

=== Verma ===
- Abhay Verma (born 1998), Indian actor
- Abhishek Verma (archer) (born 1989), Indian archer
- Abhishek Verma (arms dealer) (born 1968), Indian businessman
- Agys Ramsaran Verma, Indian politician from Uttar Pradesh
- Ajit Ram Verma, Indian physicist
- Alka Verma, Indian actress on the television show C.I.D.
- Aman Verma, Indian actor and television host
- Aman Verma (footballer)
- Amit Verma (cricketer)
- Anil Kumar Verma, Indian politician
- Anshul Verma, Indian politician and member of the 16th Lok Sabha
- Anurag Verma, New Zealand cricketer
- Aru Krishansh Verma, Indian film actor
- Arun Verma, Indian politician and member of the Uttar Pradesh Legislative Assembly
- Atul Verma (born 1997), Indian archer
- Baboo Lal Verma, Indian politician and state minister of the Government of Rajasthan
- Beni Prasad Verma, Indian politician and former Minister of Steel
- Bhagwati Charan Verma, 20th-century Hindi writer and winner of the Sahitya Akademi Award
- Bhanu Pratap Singh Verma, Indian politician who entered the Parliament of India in 2014
- Bindeshwari Prasad Verma, Indian politician and first Speaker of the Bihar Legislative Assembly
- Chandradeo Prasad Verma, Indian politician and three time member of the Lok Sabha
- Chotelal Verma, Indian politician and member of the Sixteenth Legislative Assembly of Uttar Pradesh
- Daya-Nand Verma, Indian mathematician after whom Verma modules are named
- Deepak Verma, British actor, writer and producer
- Deven Verma, Indian actor
- Dhirendra Verma, 20th-century Indian poet and linguist
- Gajendra Verma, Indian composer and playback singer
- H. C. Verma, Indian experimental nuclear physicist
- H. L. Verma, business science academic and administrator
- Harish Verma (born 1982), Indian actor
- Hemraj Verma, Indian politician and member of the Sixteenth Legislative Assembly of Uttar Pradesh
- Hikmat Singh Verma, Fiji Indian politician and former member of the House of Representatives of Fiji
- Inder Verma, molecular biologist
- J. S. Verma, Chief Justice of India
- Jai Verma, Indian Hindi writer
- Jai Prakash Verma, Indian politician
- Jhunnilal Verma, Indian lawyer and politician
- K. C. Verma, former director of RAW – India's foreign intelligence agency
- Kamla Verma, Indian politician and a former cabinet minister
- Kaushal Kumar Verma (born 1971), Indian mathematician
- Kimi Verma, Indian actress and fashion designer
- Lalji Verma, Indian politician and currently member of 18th Lok Sabha
- Mahendra K. Verma, Indian physicist working in magnetohydrodynamics
- Mahesh Verma, Indian prosthodontist
- Manas Bihari Verma, Indian aeronautical scientist
- Manikya Lal Verma, Indian politician and member of the Constituent Assembly of India
- Mayur Verma (born 1991), Indian television actor
- Mihika Verma (born 1986), Indian television actress and former model
- Motilal Verma, activist in the Indian independence movement
- Nakul Verma (born 1991), Indian cricketer
- Narendra Singh Verma, Indian politician and Uttar Pradesh Legislative Assembly
- Neelam Verma, Canadian television anchor, businesswoman and Miss Universe finalist
- Neena Verma, Indian politician and member of the Madhya Pradesh Legislative Assembly
- Nirmal Verma, Indian Hindi writer, activist and translator
- Nirmal Kumar Verma, Indian admiral who served as Chief of the Naval Staff
- Omkar Verma (born 1991), Indian cricketer
- O.P. Verma, Indian administrator who served as governor for two states
- Om Prakash Verma (politician), Indian politician and member of the Sixteenth Legislative Assembly of Uttar Pradesh
- Parmish Verma, Indian singer and actor
- Parvesh Verma, Indian politician and member of the Parliament of India
- Phool Chand Verma, Indian politician, member of the Lok Sabha and a leader of Bharatiya Janata Party
- Pony Verma, Bollywood choreographer
- Purnima Verma, political and social worker and a Member of Parliament
- R.L.P. Verma, member of Lok Sabha and a leader of Bhartiya Janata Party
- Raghunath Singh Verma, Indian politician and member of the Lok Sabha
- Rajeev Verma, Indian actor
- Rajesh Verma, Indian politician and member of the Lok Sabha
- Rakesh Verma, Indian politician
- Rakesh Kumar Verma, Indian politician and Member of the Legislative Assembly
- Ram Murti Verma, Indian politician and member of the Sixteenth Legislative Assembly of Uttar Pradesh
- Ramdeo Verma, Indian politician and long-time member of the Bihar Legislative Assembly
- Ramkumar Verma, 20th-century Indian Hindi poet
- Rammurti Singh Verma, Indian politician and member of the Sixteenth Legislative Assembly of Uttar Pradesh
- Ramswaroop Verma, 20th-century activist and politician
- Randhir Prasad Verma, Indian police officer posthumously awarded the Ashoka Chakra
- Rashmi Verma, Indian politician and member of the Bihar Legislative Assembly
- Ravi Verma, science administrator with a focus on AIDS and other social and public health issues
- Ravi Prakash Verma, Indian politician and member of the Rajya Sabha
- Rekha Verma, Indian politician and member of the sixteenth Lok Sabha
- Richard Verma, American lawyer, public servant and United States Ambassador to India
- Rita Verma, Indian politician and former Minister of State of Mines and Minerals
- Roshan Lal Verma, Indian politician and member of the Sixteenth Legislative Assembly of Uttar Pradesh
- S. P. Sen Verma, former Chief Election Commissioner of India
- Sahib Singh Verma, Indian politician and former Union Labour Minister of India
- Sajjan Singh Verma, Indian politician and member of the Lok Sabha
- Sameer Verma (1994-), Indian badminton player
- Sandip Verma, Baroness Verma, Indian English politician
- Sangeet Verma, Indian photographer and photojournalist
- Satya Mohan Verma (1933-), Indian poet
- Saurabh Verma (1981-), Indian-born American cricketer
- Shafali Verma, Indian women's cricketer
- Sheo Sharan Verma, Indian politician and member of the Lok Sabha
- Shivani Verma, Indian spiritual teacher and inspirational speaker
- Subhash Verma (1968-), Indian wrestler
- Sunil Verma, activist and survivor of the Bhopal disaster
- Sunil Kumar Verma, Indian biologist known for his work on DNA barcoding
- Surendra Verma, Indian Hindi litterateur and playwright
- Surendra Verma (science writer), Indian-Australian journalist and author of popular science books
- Sushma Verma (1992-), Indian cricketer
- Swati Verma, Indian film actress primarily working in the Bhojpuri film industry
- Tinu Verma, Indian film action director, actor, writer and producer in Hindi cinema
- Usha Verma, Indian politician and member of the Lok Sabha
- Utkarsh Verma, Indian politician, and member of Uttar Pradesh Legislative Assembly
- Veena Verma (writer), Punjabi poet and short story author living in the United Kingdom
- Vikram Verma, Indian politician and political leader of Bharatiya Janata Party in Madhya Pradesh
- Vimla Verma, Indian politician and social worker and member of the Parliament of India
- Vineet Verma, Indian film director and animator
- Virendra Verma, Indian politician and member of Rajya Sabha and Lok Sabha
- Vrindavan Lal Verma, 20th-century Indian Hindi novelist and playwright
