= Hinduism in France =

Practice of the Hindu religion, native to south-east Asia, on french territory

French Hindus
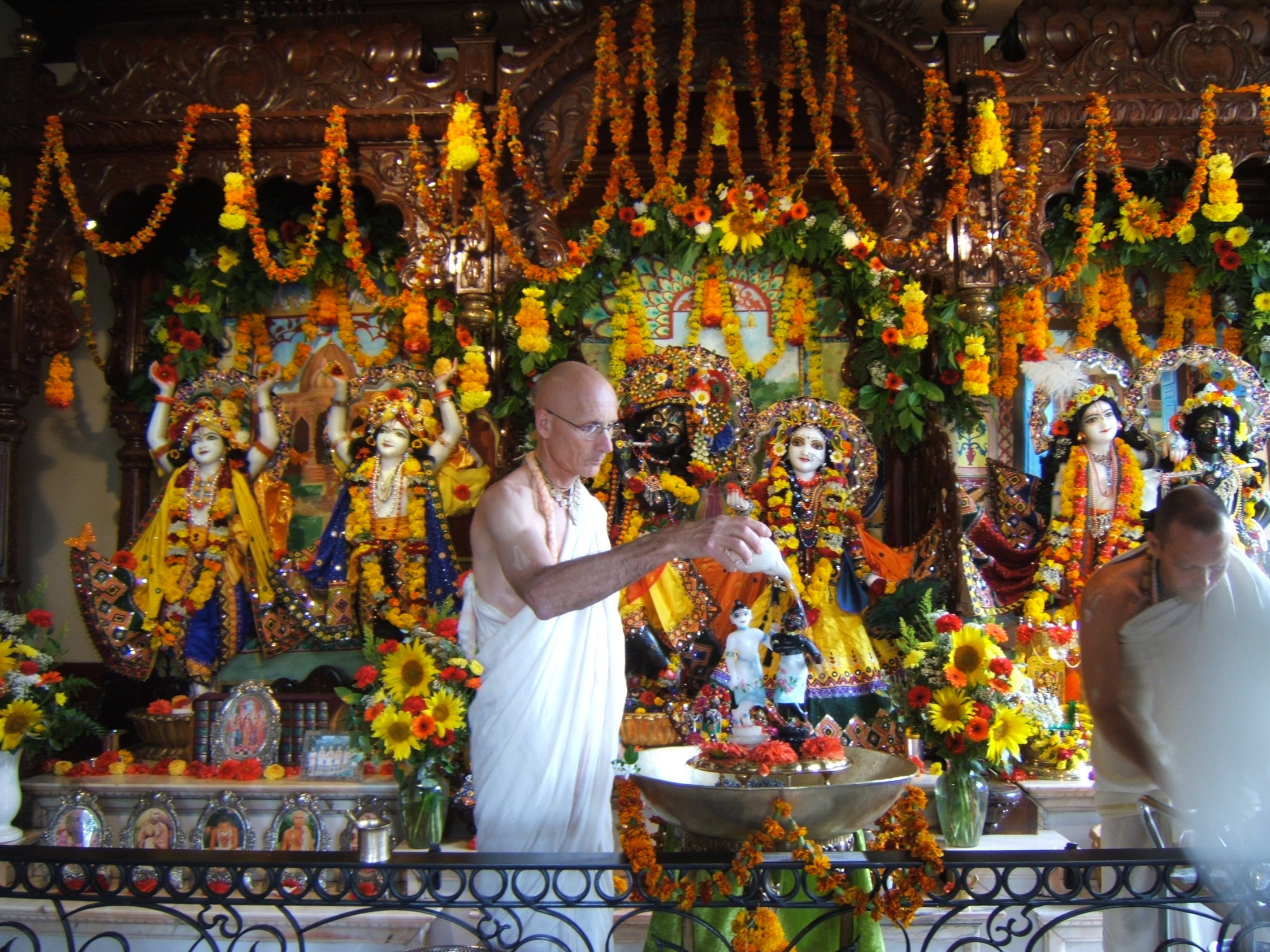
- An ISKCON temple in Luçay-le-Mâle, France.

Total population
- 100000-150000; 0.2% of the total Population

Religions
- Hinduism; Vaishnavism (majority); Shaivism and others (minority)

Scriptures
- Agamas, Bhagavad Gita and Vedas

Languages
- Sacred; Sanskrit, Old Tamil National; French; Regional; French Guianese Creole, French Antillean Creole, Réunion Creole Others; Hindi, English, Mauritian Creole, Tamil, Punjabi, etc. (among diaspora)

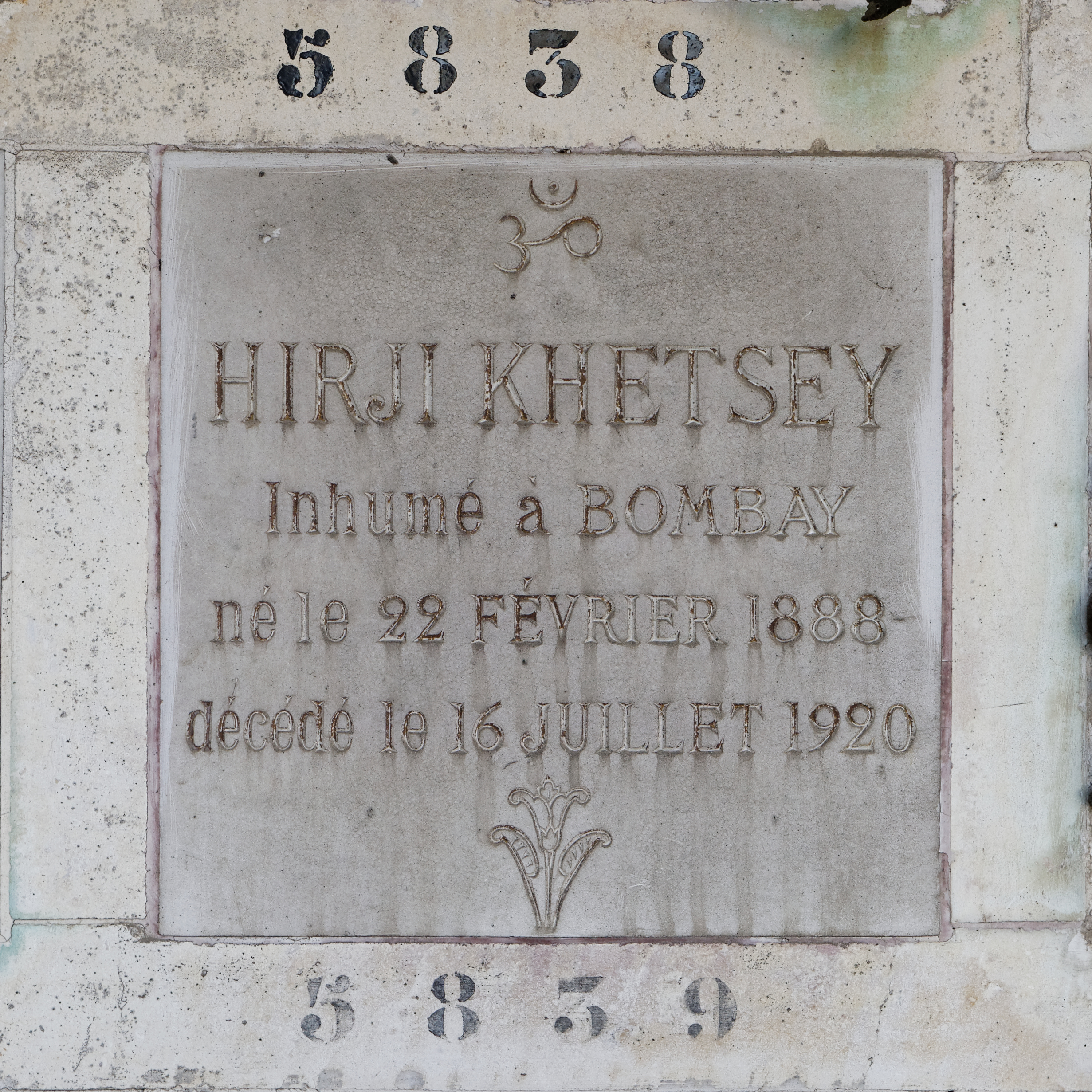
Hindu burial in the columbarium of Pere-Lachaise Cemetery

Hinduism is a minority religion in France practiced by an estimated 100,000–150,000, constituting roughly 0.2% of the national population. Because the French government does not collect official statistics on religious affiliation, all population estimates for Hindus in France remain approximate and are derived from scholarly research, community sources, and indirect indicators. France has the fifth largest Hindu population in Europe after the United Kingdom, Italy, The Netherlands and Germany.

The presence of Hindus in France stems from both the global migration of Hindu populations as well as the diffusion of Hindu religious and spiritual movements in the West. The Hindu population is diverse and is made up largely of Sri Lankan Tamil refugees who arrived since the late 1970s. The Hindu community also includes people with roots in former French India, and Indo-Caribbean communities in the French overseas territories, alongside smaller numbers of French adherents of guru-based or neo-Hindu movements.

France’s strict principle of laïcité (state secularism) shapes how Hinduism is practiced and expressed publicly in the country. Hindu organisations and temples generally maintain a low public profile.

== History ==
=== Early encounters: Enlightenment-era intellectual engagement (17th–18th centuries) ===
French interest in Hindu thought and Indian civilization long predated any significant Hindu migration to France. During the 17th and 18th centuries, Jesuit missionaries stationed in French India, particularly in Pondicherry, studied local languages and recorded South Indian religious practices, customs and traditions. Their letters and reports brought descriptions of Hindu rites, learning and law into French and wider European scholarly debate. French Jesuits such as Jean-Venant Bouchet later became important sources for enlightenment writers and early orientalists interested in Hindu beliefs and law.

=== Voltaire ===
Voltaire was one of the more influential French Enlightenment thinkers to present India as an ancient and intellectually sophisticated civilization. His view of Indian religion was shaped in part by the ''Ezour-Védam'', a French text given to him in 1760. The text was subsequently shown to be a forgery composed by French Jesuit missionaries in Pondicherry, who created it in the mid-eighteenth century to highlight elements of Indian thought compatible with Christianity and thereby aid conversion efforts.

=== Abraham Hyacinthe Anquetil-Duperron and French Indology ===
Abraham Hyacinthe Anquetil-Duperron (1731–1805), was a French orientalist and early scholar of Indian religions. He travelled to India between 1755 and 1761, where he studied Indian languages and collected manuscripts. His major contribution to the study of Indian texts included the Oupnek'hat (1801–1802), the first European translation of Upanishadic material into Latin. This work introduced Upanishadic philosophy to European scholars and had a notable influence on Arthur Schopenhauer.

In the 19th century, French Indology developed further through the work of Eugène Burnouf, Antoine-Léonard de Chézy (who held the first chair of Sanskrit at the Collège de France from 1814) and Jules Barthélemy Saint-Hilaire. The tradition continued in the 20th century with scholars such as Sylvain Lévi, Louis Renou and Jean Filliozat.

=== Colonial period and early migration (18th–19th centuries) ===
France maintained a limited colonial presence in India through five small trading settlements in Pondicherry, Karaikal, Mahé, Yanam and Chandernagore. These were established by the French East India Company between 1673 and 1739. Unlike the more substantive empire of British India, the French holdings were modest. This resulted in fewer cultural and economic ties with the Indian subcontinent and, consequently, a more limited Hindu migration and influence on France. The earliest Hindu presence in France appears to have dated from the eighteenth century and was made up largely of Indian sailors, domestic servants and other individuals connected with colonial networks.

=== Indentured labour in French overseas territories (19th Century) ===
Although the Hindu presence in maninland France remained small until later decades, a substantial community developed in France's overseas colonies through the indentured labour system. Following the abolition of slavery in 1848, sugar planters in Réunion, Guadeloupe, Martinique, and French Guiana recruited tens of thousands of Indian workers, predominantly Tamils from the French enclaves such as Pondicherry, to replace enslaved labour on the plantations. An estimated 118,000 Indians arrived in Réunion between 1828 and 1885, approximately 40,000 reached Guadeloupe and 25,000 Martinique between 1853 and the late 1880s. The migrants introduced Tamil Hindu religious practices along with elements of their culture such as language and music.

=== Migration 1947-present ===
Hindu immigration to metropolitan France accelerated following Indian independence in 1947. One early postwar group came from the former French settlements of Pondicherry and Karikal. After the decolonisation of French India, several thousand Tamil families acquired French nationality. Mauritians also began migrating for work and education following Mauritian independence in 1968. There are now approximately 60,000 Mauritians in France, primarily Hindus and Muslims, most of them settled in the Paris region.

The largest wave of Hindu migration to France originated with Sri Lankan Tamils following the outbreak of the Sri Lankan civil war in 1983. The majority of Sri Lankan Tamils are Hindu.

== Demographics ==
There is no official census count of Hindus in metropolitan France in accordance with the principle of laïcité. Estimates of the Hindu population in metropolitan France range from approximately 100,000 to 150,000.

The Hindu community is heterogeneous with Sri Lankan Tamils forming the largest group. Most Sir Lankan Tamil Hindus arrived as refugees from the late 1970s onward during the Sri Lankan civil war and are heavily concentrated in Paris.

Approximately 60,000 people of Mauritian origin live in France, many of them Hindu.

More recent Hindu residents include migrants from India, which include students and skilled professionals. A smaller group includes native French converts drawn to Hindu traditions through movements such as the International Society for Krishna Consciousness (ISKCON).

== Hinduism and French Laïcité ==
The principle of laïcité ensures that the French state does not recognise, fund, or favour any religion. While originally aimed at limiting the political influence of the Catholic Church, laïcité affects all religious minorities in France, including Hindus. Hindu communities in France generally follow this expectation by keeping most worship and community activities discreet. Temples and organizations operate through private association.

== Influence of Hinduism in France ==
In 2022, Durga Puja was celebrated in 12 pavilions across France with various events including worship, offering of Anjali, distribution of prasad, and cultural programs. Diwali is celebrated in Reunion island, also Ganesh Chaturthi is celebrated in Paris.

== French Indology and intellectual engagement with Hinduism ==
France developed a distinct tradition of scholarly and intellectual engagement with Hinduism that remained largely separate from the religious practices of later migrant communities.

=== Romain Rolland (1866–1944) ===
Romain Rolland, winner of the 1915 Nobel Prize in Literature, helped introduce modern Hindu figures to a wider European readership. He published La Vie de Ramakrishna in 1929 and La Vie de Vivekananda et l'Évangile universel in 1930, and scholarship on the Ramakrishna movement in Europe notes that Rolland's writings helped create interest in a Vedanta in France.

=== Alain Daniélou (1907–1994) ===
Alain Daniélou (1907–1994) was a French musicologist, Indologist and writer who played an important role in introducing Indian classical music, Shaivism and Hindu religious thought to European audiences. He spent time in Varanasi studying Sanskrit, Hindu philosophy and classical Indian music at Banaras Hindu University, where he was initiated into Shaivism by Swami Karpatri and adopted the name Shiva Sharan. After returning to Europe, he served as advisor to UNESCO’s International Music Council.

== Hinduism in French overseas territories ==
=== Hinduism in Martinique ===
Hinduism is followed in the Martinique by the Indo-Martiniquais. Though Indo-Martiniquais comprises approximately 10% of the population of the island of Martinique, inly 15% of Indo-Martiniquais are Hindus.

=== Hinduism in French Guiana ===
As of 2010, Hinduism is followed by 1.6% of the population of French Guiana. It is practiced mostly by the descendants of the Indo-Guyanese, who in 2014 numbered around 360,000.

=== Hinduism in Réunion ===
The French government gathers no statistics on religious affiliation. Because of this, it is impossible to know accurately how many Hindus there are in Réunion. Estimates of practicing Hindus vary from 6.7% to 10.7%. Most of the large towns have a functioning Hindu temple. An interesting feature, likely peculiar to Réunion, is the simultaneous observance by some ethnic Indians of both Catholic and Hindu faiths, a practice that has earned them the sobriquet of being "socially Catholic and privately Hindu."

=== Hinduism in Guadeloupe ===
Hinduism is practised by Some Indo-Guadeloupeans in Guadeloupe. According to statistics, Hinduism is followed by 0.5% of the Guadelopeans.

== Notable French Hindus ==
- Vikash Dhorasoo, a member of the French Football World Cup squad in 2006. He is an ethnic Mauritian Indian from the town of Le Havre.
- Alain Danielou, a French historian, intellectual, musicologist, Indologist and noted Western convert to Shaivite Hinduism.
- Arnaud Desjardins, French journalist, film maker, main disciple of Swami Prajnanpad.
- François Gautier, French journalist, settled in India and Western convert to Hinduism.
- Bapi Das Baul, Bengali folk musician born in Kolkata and settled in France.
- Bollozzou Bassavalingam, Poet and writer, born in Yanam and settled in France.
- Jayasri Burman, painter and sculptor born in Kolkata.
- Maya Burman
- Sakti Burman

== Famous Hindu Temples ==
- Sri Sathya Narayana Padhuga Temple, 6-8 Avenue Anatole France, 94600 Choisy-le-Roi, France
- Temple Ganesh, 17 Rue Pajol, 75018 Paris, France
- Radha Krishna Temple, 230 Avenue de la Division Leclerc, 95200 Sarcelles, France
- BAPS Swaminarayan Hindu Mandir, Bussy-Saint-Georges. Construction began in 2024 and was inaugurated on September 6, 2026. It has been described as the first traditionally built Hindu Temple in continental Europe.

== See also ==
- Hinduism by country
- Religion in France
- Demographics of France
- Indians in France
- Freedom of religion in France
- Buddhism in France
