= BAPS Swaminarayan Hindu Mandir, Paris =

Hindu temple located in Seine-et-Marne, France

- Location within France

Religion
- Affiliation: Hinduism
- Sect: BAPS Swaminarayan Sanstha
- Province: Bussy-Saint-Georges
- Region: Seine-et-Marne
- Deity: Akshar Purushottam
- Year consecrated: 2026

Location
- Country: France
- Coordinates: 48.8406°N 2.7297°E

Architecture
- Founder: Mahant Swami Maharaj

The BAPS Swaminarayan Hindu Mandir, Paris (French: BAPS Mandir Swaminarayan Hindou de Paris) is a Hindu temple in Bussy-Saint-Georges, Seine-et-Marne, located in the eastern suburbs of Paris, France. Constructed by Bochsanwasi Akshar Purshottam Swaminarayan Sanstha (BAPS), it is the first traditionally designed Hindu temple in France, where current Hindu places of worship have generally been housed in converted premises. The temple stands on the Esplanade des Religions et des Cultures, a multi-faith sector that also houses Buddhist, Muslim, Jewish and Christian places of worship.

Construction began in April 2024 to a design developed with the French architectural firm Arte Charpentier, led by architect Georges H. Souaid. The project combines a stone mandir carved in India with a modern cultural centre. Mahant Swami Maharaj, the spiritual head of BAPS, consecrated the temple on 6 September 2026 during a thirteen-day Festival of Culture (Festival de la Culture) held from 2 to 14 September 2026. Le Parisien has described it as the largest traditional Hindu Temple within mainland Europe.

== Background ==
BAPS is a denomination within the Swaminarayan branch of Hinduism and was established as a separate organization in 1907. Its century-old tradition of constructing intricately carved stone temples has become increasingly visible internationally, particularly through temples built for Hindu communities outside of India. In 1995, BAPS opened the Shri Swaminarayan Mandir in Neasden, London, widely regarded as Europe's first traditional Hindu Mandir. The organization has constructed large stone temples in the global Hindu diaspora, including the BAPS Hindu Mandir in Abu Dhabi.

== History ==
In July 1970, Yogiji Maharaj, then spiritual head of BAPS, stopped at Le Bourget Airport near Paris and offered blessings that the Swaminarayan Hindu fellowship would flourish in France. Pramukh Swami Maharaj later visited Paris in May 1988 and performed a symbolic blessing by showering flower petals from a helicopter. On 2 August 1995, days before inaugurating the mandir in London, Pramukh Swami Maharaj expressed his vision to create a traditional stone Hindu mandir in Paris.

In 2017, the mayor of Bussy-Saint-Georges, Yann Dubosc, met Mahant Swami Maharaj and confirmed the allocation of a plot for a mandir on the Esplanade des Religions et des Cultures. A ground-sanctification ceremony (bhumi pujan) was performed on the site in October 2021, and the foundation stone-laying ceremony (shilanyas) took place on 3–4 September 2022 in the presence of BAPS swamis, local officials and representatives of the Esplanade's other congregations.

Construction began in late April 2024, with Bateg, a subsidiary of Vinci Construction, serving as the general contractor and GS Construction responsible for the interior fit-out. The project was presented to BAPS congregations in Europe at the BAPS Shri Swaminarayan Mandir in London on 4 May 2024. On 4 June 2024 Yan Dubosc, the town's mayor, attended a ceremony in Bussy-Saint-Georges to mark the driving of the first foundation pile. The first shipments of carved stone from India arrived in France in January 2026 and were received at a ceremony attended by the Indian ambassador to France, Sanjeev Kumar Singla.

The construction site has also been visited by French public officials. Valérie Pécresse, president of the Regional Council, toured the site on 1 October 2025, while the prefect of Seine-et-Marne, Pierre Ory, visited the site in May 2026.

== Esplanade of Religions and Cultures ==
Since the mid-2000s the municipality of Bussy-Saint-Georges has developed the Esplanade des Religions et des Cultures along the Allée Madame de Montespan. The project groups places of worship of different religions in one district in order to encourage interreligious dialogue. The first stone of a religious building on the site was laid in 2006.

The Fo Guang Shan Buddhist temple, described as the largest Buddhist temple in Europe, was inaugurated there on 24 June 2012. A mosque and a Laotian pagoda have since been added, and a synagogue is also planned.

In February 2018, Le Parisien reported that BAPS had approached the association responsible for the Esplanade seeking approval to build a Hindu temple on a site next to the mosque.

== Architecture ==
The mandir has a square footage of approximately 5,000 m² and consists of a basement and two upper floors, together with a landscaped rooftop terrace accessible to visitors. The lower floors, called the 'Haveli' , contain the cultural and community facilities. This includes classrooms, offices, a sports hall and multifunctional spaces. The upper level contains the mandir itself, which is surmounted by carved stone domes and spires of varying heights.

The building conforms to and incorporates key features of traditional Hindu temple architecture, such as 5 'Shikhars' (Spires or Pinnacles), 4 'Chhatris' (Canopies), 10 Ghummats (Domes) including the bigger central dome, 73 'Gavakshas' (Windows) and 15 ornately carved Pillars called 'Stambha'. Its stone components, which are made of Gwalior Sandstone, and Marble from Italy, Greece and Ambaji (in Gujarat, India) were hand-carved in India, with volunteers contributing to the work, before being shipped to France for construction. Indian stone artisans have worked on site alongside French masons, and project representatives have said that some of the French craftsmen had previously been involved in the restoration of Notre-Dame de Paris. Arte Charpentier has described the building as the first traditional Hindu temple in continental Europe, while Batiactu has described it as the first of its kind in the European Union.

== Religious and cultural role ==
The Times of India described the mandir as an important center for France's Hindu community, where families can celebrate festivals and pass religious traditions down generations. The role of mandirs in maintaining religious traditions across generations has been noted in studies of BAPS communities outside India. Anthropologist Hanna Kim, writing about BAPS mandirs in the West, has examined how the organization has presented Swaminarayan teachings for younger devotees growing up in different cultural settings. She notes that this has become part of the broader transmission of Swaminarayan traditions to successive generations.

== Volunteer participation ==
Volunteers from the BAPS community were also involved in the construction of the temple. In August 2026, Doordarshan, covered volunteers engaged in detailed finishing work on carved wooden and stone decorative components of the mandir. Within the BAPS Swaminarayan tradition, such voluntary work is considered as seva, or devotional service. Anthropologist Hanna H. Kim has described a longstanding relationship between volunteer service and BAPS temple-building. Noting that devotees contribute broadly to temple projects through activities ranging from fundraising to physical construction work, Kim emphasized that this participation is understood by devotees not simply as voluntary labor, but an expression of devotion (bhakti) to God and the guru. BAPS devotees consider seva performed according to the guru's commands as service to God and a path to spiritual progress.

== Inauguration ==
The temple was consecrated on 6 September 2026 by Mahant Swami Maharaj, the spiritual head of BAPS during a thirteen-day festival from 2 to 14 September 2026. The ceremony included the prana pratishtha of Akshar-Purushottam, Radha-Krishna, Sita-Ram, Shiva-Parvati and other Hindu deities. The event was attended by several thousand people. The municipality of Bussy-Saint-Georges reported that the festival would be represented by thirty eight nationalities and the event would be supported by 3000 volunteers.

During BAPS's 5 September 2026 visit to the Eiffel Tower, the tower's management reassigned some female employees, prompting what Bussy-Saint Georges Mayor Yann Dobosc called a 'media frenzy' focused on BAPS. Sociologist of religion and co-founder of the Center for Studies on New Religions (CESNUR), Massimo Introvigne, argued that a number of French outlets had falsely attributed the exclusions to BAPS before formal investigations concluded. He linked the media coverage to Frances's longstanding suspicion of minority religious movements, arguing that the combination of gender, religion, and Indian politics had encouraged sensational reporting.

The delegation visit the tower on 5 September 2026 during the Festival de la Culture, as the start of opening hours. BAPS said it had requested this slot to avoid disrupting other visitors, given the large delegation size of around a 100 people. Tower management reassigned female employees at some posts, prompting a staff strike and the tower's closure on 7 September 2026. BAPS said it never asked for female staff to be removed.

While the investigations were ongoing, Dubosc described the events as unacceptable and maintained his support of BAPS, saying the coverage caricatured the organisation. His chief of staff, Cedric Tartaud-Gineste, said the controversy had unfairly cast suspicion on the municipality's Hindu partners. He added that the town had maintained a relationship with BAPS for ten years without encountering any problems.

The Paris municipal inspectorate's investigation found that BAPS made no request to exclude women throughout the visit. The inspectorate found that the delegation had originally communicated to the tower's operator, SETE, only the monks vows of celibacy, and that SETE staff progressively expanded it, as it was passed on by word of mouth through their management team, into instructions to move or replace female employees along the visit route. Religious studies scholar Bhakti Mamtora argued that the controversy arose from a gap between what BAPS had asked for and what SETE told its staff to do. She explained that the monks observe brahmacharya as a personal discipline without expecting others to change their behaviour. A separate independent inquiry commissioned by SETE identified operational failures on SETE's part that resulted in female staff being excluded.

== See also ==
- Hinduism in France
- Hindu Temples in France
