= Indians in French Guiana =

Demographic group of immigrants and descendants

Indians in French Guiana are mostly Indian descendants of Tamil, Telugu, and other South Indian ancestry whose ancestors were indentured labourers from India who came to French Guiana in the late 19th to early 20th-century.

== Migration history ==
Between 1838 and 1917, there were 19,276 Indian immigrants to French Guiana. Labour from India began to enter French Guiana beginning in 1862. By the mid-1880s, however, the British stopped shipments of Indians in response to allegations that the French were ill-treating indentured to the Indian workers under their employ.

== See also ==
- Indians in France
- Indo-Caribbean
- Indians in Guadeloupe
- Indo-Martiniquais
- Tamils in France
