= Maite Delteil =

French painter

Maite Delteil (born 1933 in Furnel, France) is a French painter exhibiting predominantly in India.

== Biography ==
Maite Delteil was raised in the French countryside and educated at the Ecole Des Beaux-Arts, Academie de la Grand Chaumiere and the Académie Julian. Delteil then received a fellowship from the French government and Institut de France to study in Spain and Greece. In 1959, she received the Prix De la Casa Velasquez. Following her marriage to Kolkota-born painter Sakti Burman she was introduced to India and its culture. Her first solo exhibition took place in Kolkota in 1964 and, since 2001, Delteil has primarily exhibited in India.

Delteil's work has been described as creating an "idyllscape" of "everyday scenes". Her exhibition Enchanted at Art Musings Gallery, Colaba, Mumbai in January 2013 consisted of intricate colourful paintings of "perfectly round trees, serene-looking people and pretty birds" which conveyed "the meaning of life without being morbid or dark".

Delteil has had exhibitions in several other countries, including France, the United States. and Japan. Her works are in several public and private collections of these countries.

A book titled "Maite Delteil : Enchanted" about Delteil, her life, and work was published in 2013.

== Personal life ==
Delteil married Indian painter Sakti Burman in 1963. Her daughter is award-winning painter Maya Burman. Besides her husband and daughter, her extended family includes eminent artists: Jayasri Burman, her husband's niece and Jayasri's husband Paresh Maity. Delteil spends half the year living in Paris and the other half in India.
