= French people in India =

French people in India Indiens d’origine française
- (France) (India)

Total population
- 12,864 (1988)

Regions with significant populations
- Pondicherry; Chennai; Mumbai; New Delhi; Mahé; Chandernagore; Hyderabad

Languages
- French; Indian French; English; Tamil; Other Indian languages

Religion
- Majority Christianity Minority Hinduism

Related ethnic groups
- French people

The French community in India consists mainly of Indian citizens of French ancestry who are descended from former French settlers and colonists who settled in the Indian subcontinent since the 17th century, as well as recent expatriates from France.

== History ==
The French in India are an artifact of the French presence there, which began in 1673 with the establishment of the French East India Company and continued until 1962 when the French territory was formally transferred to India. The French presence was always minor compared with the British presence, and the French in India were generally not a significant portion of the population.

There were 9,950 French nationals residing in India in 2013. Nearly all are in the Puducherry district in southeastern India (11,726 individuals in 1988), with much smaller numbers in Karaikal (695 individuals), Mahé (50), Yanam (46), and 342 elsewhere in India. They form a small minority, accounting for less than 3 percent of the present population of Puducherry.

== Indian French ==
Indian French (French: Français Indien) is a dialect of French spoken by Indians from the former colonies of French India; namely Pondicherry (Pondichéry), Mahé, Yanam (Yanaon), Karaikal (Karikal) in the union territory of Puducherry (Poudouchéry) and the Chandannagar (Chandernagor) subdivision in the state of West Bengal. It has considerable influence from English and the regional languages of India, such as the Dravidian languages of Tamil (Pondicherry Tamil dialect), Telugu (Yanam Telugu dialect) and Malayalam (Mahé Malayalam dialect) and the Indo-Aryan language of Bengali in Chandannagar.

There are several varieties of Indian French, corresponding to the former French colonies, as follows:

- Tamil people (nearly 60,000 in France, 10,000 people in Puducherry)
- Telugu people (nearly 10,000 in France, 35,000 people in Yanam)
- Malayali people (4,000–5,000 in France)

=== Examples of Indian French ===
Indian French spoken in former French India vaguely varies from Standard French, in pronunciation and accent, with a few unique words, such as:

Indian French	Metropolitan French	Meaning in English
Mérci beauco	Merci beaucoup	Thank you very much
Mousé	Monsieur	Mister/Sir
Madam	Madame	Madam/Ma'am
Locaele	Locale	Local
Perme	Fermer	Close
Parlama	Parlement	Parliament
Baccaloria	Baccalauréat	Baccalauréat (French secondary school diploma)
Sulda	Soldat	Colloquially: Indians with French citizenship Literally: Soldier
Coseiyya	Conseiller	Councilor

== Current status ==
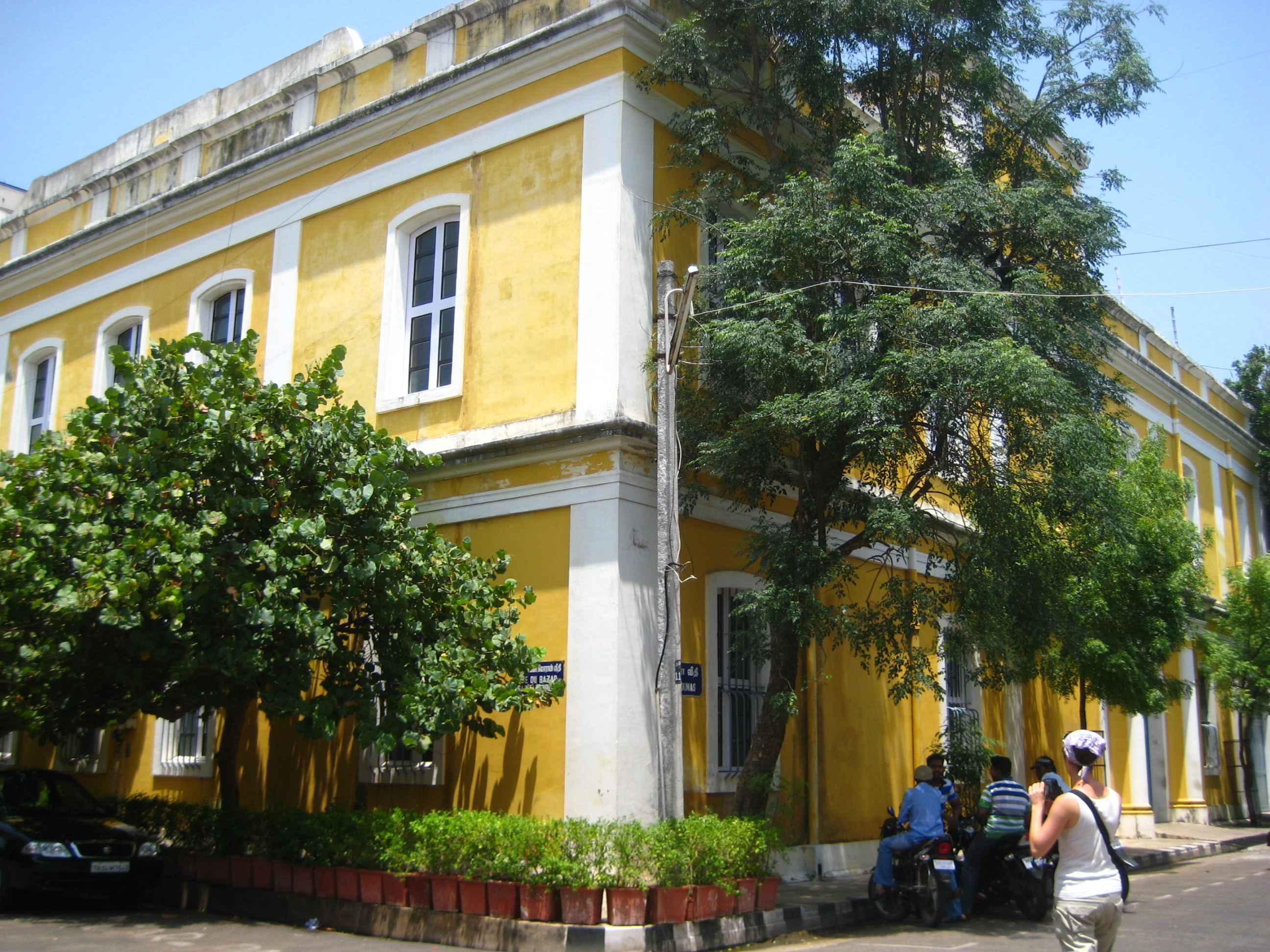
Building of the École française d'Extrême-Orient in Pondicherry

Today, Pondicherry still has a community of French people living in the city. There are 6,500 French people registered in South India, and of these about 5,500 are in Pondicherry.

French companies in India are present in various sectors such as energy, IT, environment, automobiles, traditional manufacturing industries like St Gobain, and engineering. They also have exporters of fish and other seafood, textiles, leather and luxury goods. L’Oréal has a presence in India, and Louis Vuitton has taken a stake in Hidesign in Pondicherry.

The French community in India is a consolidated group, brought together by a number of different organizations that aim to promote French culture in India. The French Club of Bombay is an organization that unites French speakers living in the city. The club meets at different locations in various parts of Mumbai so that meetings are conveniently located and have a good attendance.

In February 2015, the Indo French Senior Citizens Association staged street protests in Pondicherry to protest against denial of the French nationality and voting rights derived from the "treaty of cession" of French India territories, which guaranteed continued French citizenship to individuals whose birth and nativity certificate had been registered during the French India regime.

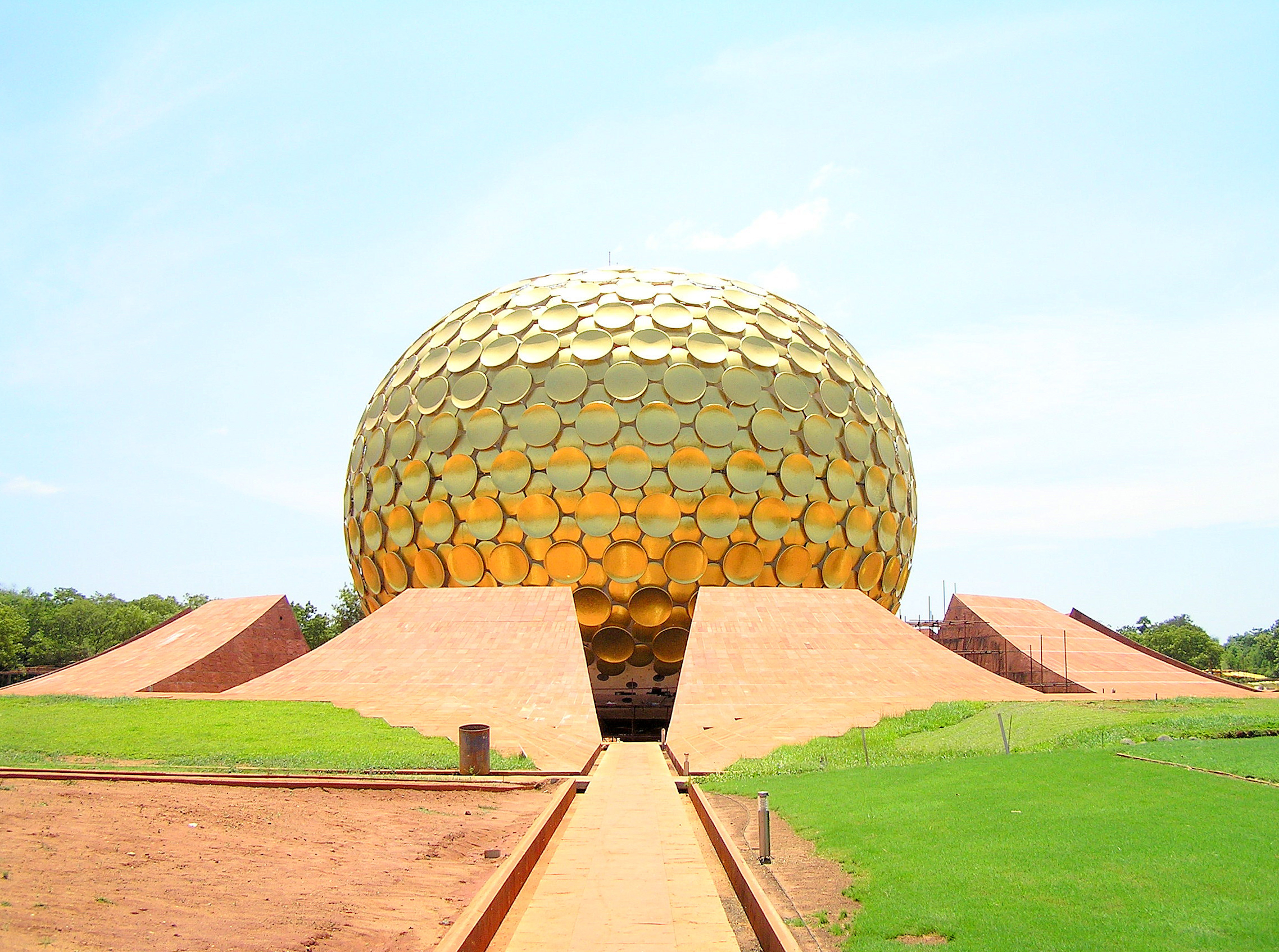
The Matrimandir, initiated by The Mother of the Sri Aurobindo Ashram

== Notable people ==
- Abhishiktananda (born Henri Le Saux) – French Benedictine monk
- Mirra Alfassa – also known as "The Mother"; spiritual collaborator of Sri Aurobindo
- Yvonne Artaud – French educator, ethnologist, psychologist and artist
- Andre Beteille (born 1934) – Indian sociologist
- Pierre Ceyrac – French Jesuit priest, engaged in charitable work
- Christabel Chamarette – Senator for Western Australia (born in India and is of French Huguenot descent)
- Alain Daniélou – French historian, intellectual, musicologist and Indologist
- François Gautier – writer and journalist based in India
- Catherine Grand – wife of Charles Maurice de Talleyrand-Périgord, the first Prime Minister of France
- Maïna Kataki – founder of the charity Samarpan Ashram
- Kalki Koechlin – French actress born in Pondicherry
- Jules Monchanin (known as Swami Paramarubyananda) – French Catholic priest, monk and hermit
- Pavitra – early disciple of Sri Aurobindo and The Mother
- Satprem – author
- Cyril Desbruslais - Jesuit priest, playwright and author.
- Andreanne Nouyrigat - French actress based in Pondicherry

== Bibliography ==
- David-Néel, Alexandra (2002). L' Inde où j'ai vécu: Avant et après l'indépendance. Paris: Plon.
- Elfi, Nicole (2008). Aux sources de l'Inde: L'initiation à la connaissance. Paris: Les Belles Lettres.
- Gautier, François (2005). La caravane intérieure: Récit. Paris: Les Belles lettres.
- Gautier, François (2008) Les Français en Inde – Pondichéry, Chandernagor, Mahé, Yanaon, Karikal. France Loisirs.
- Sethna, K. D. (1987). The obscure and the mysterious: A research in Mallarmé's symbolic poetry. Pondicherry: Sri Aurobindo International Centre of Education.

== See also ==
- Hinduism in Martinique
- France–India relations
- French India
- Indians in France
