= Hinduism in Martinique =

Hinduism is followed in Martinique by a small number of Indo-Martinicans. As of 2007, Hinduism constituted 0.3% of the population of Martinique.

== History ==
After the abolition of slavery in 1848, plantation owners filled their need for laborers by importing Indians from the subcontinent including those with origins from Pondicherry as a French colony at the time, starting in 1853. These immigrants brought with them their Hindu religion. Many Hindu temples are still in use in Martinique and, in 1987, a personal description of their secret ceremonies was published by a Hindu participant. Many of the rituals practiced by Hindus earlier, are now extinct as most of them converted to Christianity. Marching on cutlass was quite a common practice earlier but has died down over the years.

The symbols, gestures and myths of Hinduism were an important inspiration to the French artist Paul Gauguin, who visited Martinique in 1887.

== Demographics ==
Though Indo-Martinicans comprise approximately 10% of the population of the island of Martinique, only a few 20-30% of them are still Hindus. Though, the number of Christians converting to Hinduism is steadily increasing with revival efforts.

Hindus and quimboiseurs (another religion in Martinique) consider themselves also to be Catholic due to the lack of connection with the Hindus worldwide. Maldevidan Spiritists is a syncretic religion in Martinique which combine aspects of the Hindu religion with Catholicism associating the principal deity, Maldevidan (Madurai Veeran), with Jesus Christ and the second most important deity, Mari-eman (Mariamman), with the Virgin Mary. This is common in the northern regions of the island with many shrines and gathering places throughout the region. Rituals include playing drums, dancing on sharpened machetes, and sacrificing animals such as roosters and sheep.

== Contemporary status ==
Hinduism in Martinique constitutes a variation of popular Tamil Hinduism, which was characterized by the practice of animal sacrifice, the veneration of village deities and the use of the Tamil language as the ceremonial language, although the language has lost its usage in the plantation and post-plantation society.

The central figures of Hindus here are Hindu goddess Mariamman known locally as Mariémen and Madurai Veeran locally known as Madevilen. There is a historic Hindu temple in Basse-Pointe in Martinique built in the 19th century, which is still in use.

In recent years there has been a revival of Hinduism in Martinique, including Hindu mela programmes.

== See also ==
- French Indians
- Indians in France
