= Buurman =

Buurman may refer to:

== People ==
- Atse Buurman (born 1982), Dutch cricketer
- Eva Buurman (born 1994), Dutch cyclist
- Yelmer Buurman (born 1987), Dutch racing driver

== Television ==
- Buurman en Buurman, a Dutch version of the Czech TV show Pat & Mat

== See also ==
- Burman
- Burmann
