= Lotus Vingadassamy-Engel =

French Guadeloupean poet, lyricist, and professor (1946–2026)

- Born: Geneviève Yolande Marie Hoareau; 17 December 1946; Basse-Terre, Guadeloupe, Overseas France
- Died: 6 April 2026 (aged 79); Saint-Jean-de-Liversay, France
- Occupations: Poet; lyricist; professor

Academic background
- Education: University of California, San Diego

Geneviève Yolande Marie Engel (née Hoareau; 17 December 1946 – 6 April 2026), known professionally as Lotus Vingadassamy-Engel and Lotus Engel, was a French Guadeloupean poet, lyricist, and professor of French literature of the 18th century. Vingadassamy-Engel was known for her 1992 work "The Hindu Diaspora in the French West Indies".

== Biography ==
Genevieve Yolande Marie Hoareau was born on 17 December 1946 in Basse-Terre, Guadeloupe to a Hindu Tamil-Guadeloupean family. Vingadassamy-Engel received her PhD from the University of California, San Diego.

By 1981, Vingadassamy-Engel was living in France where she taught at schools and universities. From the 1980s onwards Vingadassamy-Engel published poetry, lyrics and works of fiction. Vingadassamy-Engel's poem The Scribe was calligraphed by Claude Mediavilla, a calligrapher, type designer and painter.

In December 1991, Vingadassamy-Engel gave a lecture entitled "The Hindu Diaspora in the French West Indies" at the India International Centre, which detailed the effects of indentured labour on Indo-Guadeloupeans, and the Hindu customs practiced among their descendants. Vingadassamy-Engel's work played a role in the cementing of Indo-Guadeloupeans as being part of the Indian diaspora. A revised version of this lecture was subsequently published in the India International Quarterly in 1992. Vingadassamy-Engel was a founding member of the PALM India Foundation, and served as the artistic director. Vingadassamy-Engel was also a painter, sculptor and calligrapher.

On 6 April 2026 Vingadassamy-Engel died in Saint-Jean-de-Liversay, aged 79.

== Bibliography ==
=== Articles ===
- Vingadassamy-Engel, Lotus (1992). "The Hindu Diaspora in the French West Indies". India International Quarterly. 19 (3). New Delhi, India: India International Centre: 6–26.

=== Fiction ===
- Engel, Lotus (2019). Cachou, Sésame et Pissenlit (in French). Paris, France: Éditions Édilivre. ISBN 978-2414370788.
- Engel, Lotus (2014). Petite Vie (in French). Paris, France: Éditions Édilivre. ISBN 9782332810014.

=== Poetry ===
- Engel, Lotus (2002). Il n'est jamais trop tard pour se mettre en rever (in French). Paris, France: Publibook. ISBN 978-2748328875.
- Engel, Lotus (1984). Foule dans ma fureur, foule dans ma candeur (in French). Paris, France: PALM. ISBN 2-904-503-02-1.
- Engel, Lotus (1983). Et plus vif est le trait, plus se creuse le vide (in French). Paris, France: PALM. ISBN 9782904566004.
- Engel, Lotus (1983). Vieillesse mon servage, vieillesse mon honneur (in French). Paris, France: PALM.

=== Poetry and lyrics ===
- Engel, Lotus (2025). Car Sourcière je fus (in French). Norderstedt, Germany: BoD. ISBN 9782322573622.
- Engel, Lotus (2024). Pour peu que l'Amour passe (in French). Norderstedt, Germany: BoD. ISBN 9782322513406.
- Engel, Lotus (2022). Je suis la Ville qui hurle dans le noir: Poèmes et chansons (in French). Norderstedt, Germany: BoD. ISBN 9782322517879.
- Engel, Lotus (2022). Je suis ce F...trés majuscule (in French). Paris, France: Éditions Édilivre. ISBN 978-2414575923.
- Engel, Lotus (2021). L'Arc-en-ciel: chansons et comptines (in French). Paris, France: Éditions Édilivre. ISBN 978-2414485130.
