= Maya Burman =

French artist (born 1971)

- Born: 1971 (age 54–55); Lot-et-Garonne, France

Maya Burman (born 1971) is a French artist.

== Biography ==
Burman was born in Lot et Garrone, France and brought up in France. She initially trained as an architect, but later began painting. She works mainly in pen and ink, and watercolor. This spontaneous media encourages her to create series of works, because overworking or reworking each painting with new ideas is difficult. She has had exhibitions of her work in India, France, and the UK.

She is the youngest member of an extended family of artists: her father, Sakti Burman (from Kolkata) and French mother Maite Delteil, are both prominent artists, as are her cousin, Jayasri Burman and Jayasri's husband, Paresh Maity.

== Awards ==
- Award for Young Painters - Salon de Colombes (1997)
- Award of the Fine Art Association of Sannois (1998)
- Award of the Salon d'Automne Paris (2000)
- Award of Watercolours Painting Section Salon de Colombes (2001)

== Personal life ==
Burman had a marriage in India at age 23 and subsequently had a son. The marriage ended after two years and Burman returned with her son to France.
