= Sakti Burman =

Indian painter and sculptor (born 1935)

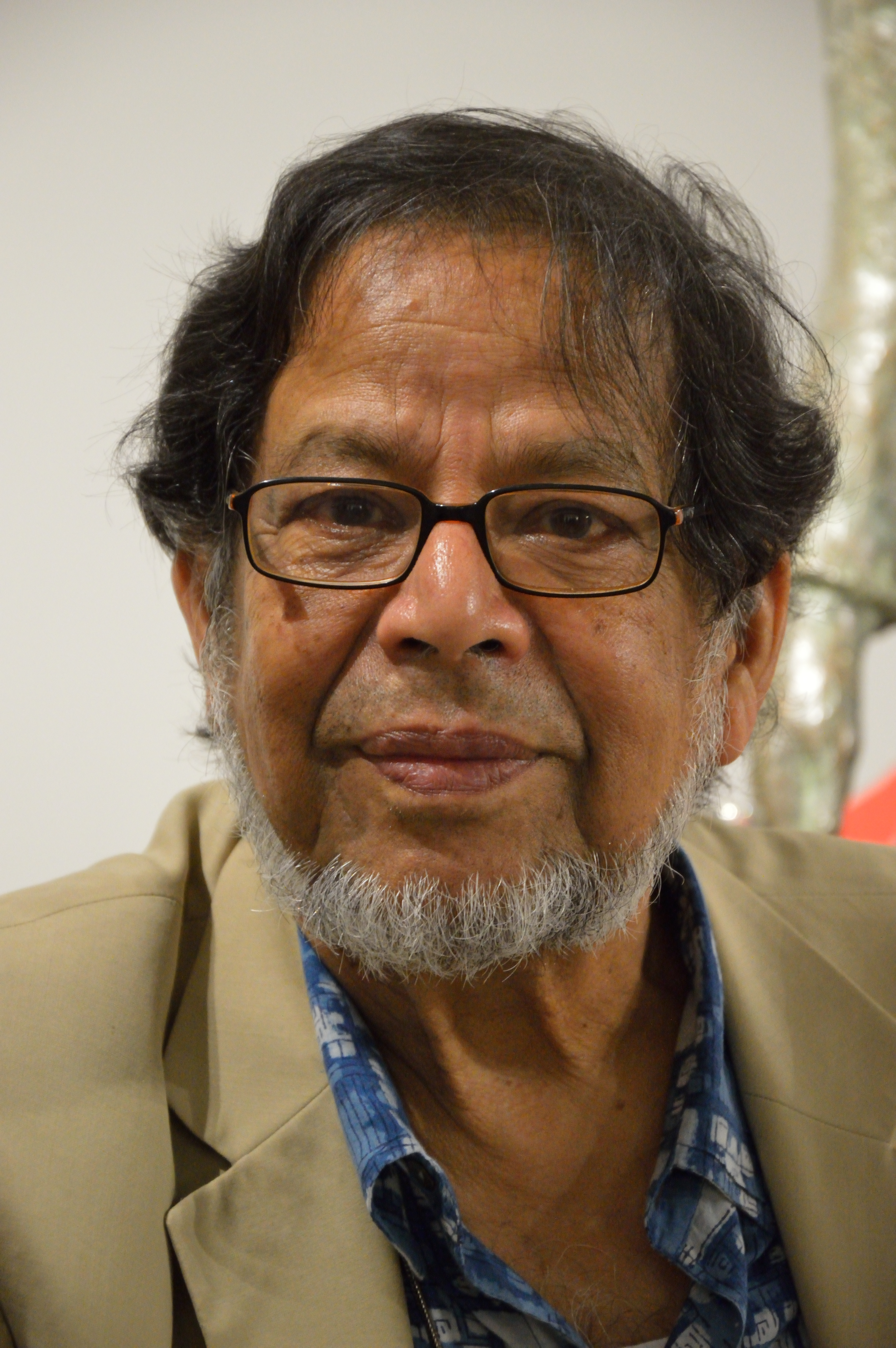
- Burman at Academy of Fine Arts, Kolkata
- Born: Calcutta, Bengal Presidency, British India
- Occupations: Painter and sculptor
- Spouse: Maite Delteil

Sakti Burman (also spelled Shakti, Shakthi and Sakthi [born 1935 in Calcutta]) is a contemporary Indian artist of Indian parentage living in France.

He grew up in what is now Bangladesh, British India. He has lived in France for the last five decades, while maintaining strong ties with India, where he regularly exhibits his works. He is married to French painter Maite Delteil. His extended family includes several eminent artists: his daughter, Maya Burman also lives and works in France; his niece, Jayasri Burman was inspired by him and is a notable artist in her own right; as is his niece's husband, Paresh Maity. He has had several exhibitions of his work in India, and elsewhere, and won several prizes.

A painter and lithographer, Burman is known to use rich colors in his artwork.
