= Henry Sidambarom =

Justice of the peace and advocate for Indian workers in Guadeloupe (1863–1952)

- Born: July 5, 1863; Capesterre-Belle-Eau, Guadeloupe
- Died: September 15, 1952 (aged 89); Guadeloupe
- Occupations: Justice of the Peace, activist
- Known for: Defender of the rights of Indian workers in Guadeloupe; secured French citizenship for Indians of Guadeloupe
- Honors: Legion of Honour (requested in 1948)

Henry Sidambarom (5 July 1863 – 15 September 1952) was a Justice of the Peace and defender of the cause of Indian workers in Guadeloupe. He was born in Capesterre-Belle-Eau, Guadeloupe, and was a Guadeloupean of Indian origin.

In 1884, he was employed at the head office of Indian immigration to Basse-Terre. In 1904, he filed a lawsuit, demanding French citizenship for the Indians of Guadeloupe. The trial of this suit lasted from 23 February 1904 until April 1923 - almost 20 years - but he won.

In 1948, the City Council and the General Council of Capesterre Belle Eau asked the French government to award Sidambarom the Legion of Honour.

In 2013, the Félix Eboué Prize was dedicated on the 150th anniversary of his birth. In December 2013, the Indian ambassador to France, Arun Kumar Singh, visited Guadeloupe for commemoration of the 150th anniversary of Henry Sidambarom's birth.

== See also ==
- History of Guadeloupe
- Indentured servant
- Indians in Guadeloupe
- Non-resident Indian and person of Indian origin
