= Indo-Guadeloupeans =

Total population
- 35,617

Regions with significant populations
- Basse-Terre · Capesterre-Belle-Eau · Saint-François

Languages
- Guadeloupean Creole French · Standard French · Tamil · Telugu · English · Hindi · Sindhi · other languages of South Asia

Religion
- Christianity (majority Catholic with Protestant minorities) · Hinduism · Islam

Related ethnic groups
- Indo-Martiniquais · Indo-Caribbean · Tamil diaspora · Telugu diaspora · Tamil people · Telugu people · Indian people · Indian diaspora

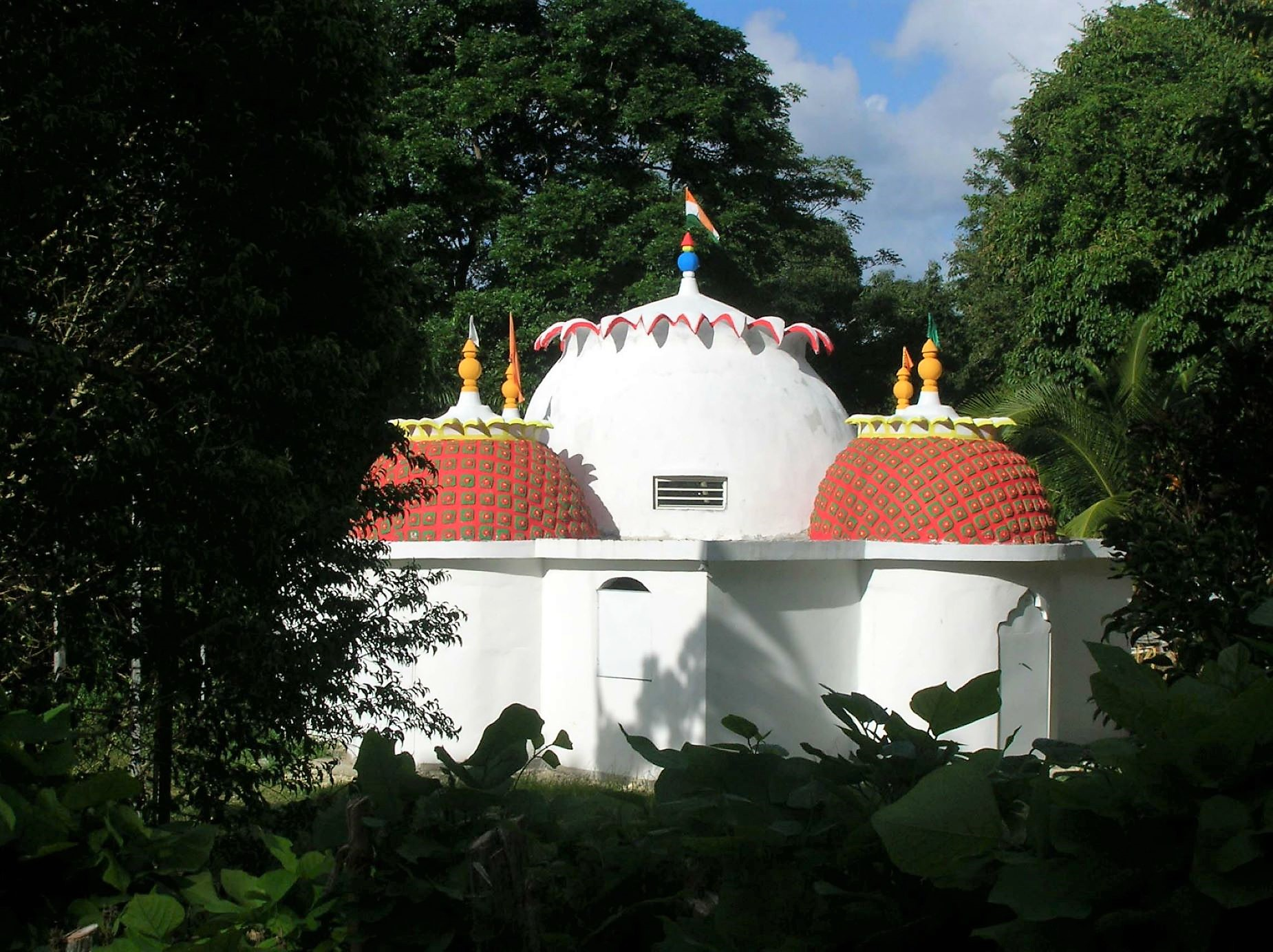
Hindu Temple in Le Moule, Grande-Terre.

Indo-Guadeloupeans are mostly descended from indentured workers who came mostly from South India in the late 19th century. There are currently about 35,617 people of Indian origin living in Guadeloupe, making it home to one of the largest South Indian populations in the Caribbean.

== History ==
Tamils in Guadeloupe trace their roots to over 40,000 indentured workers who were brought from India to Guadeloupe in 1861 to work on plantations through an agreement reached between France and the United Kingdom. The importation of Indian labor was gradually discontinued after 1883 as a result of adoption of a policy by the British Government against recruitment of labor in its territories and also because of the high mobility of Indian labor.

Over 10,000 of them perished as a result of difficult living and working conditions and the rest continued to be treated harshly until they secured some political rights in 1904 due to Henry Sidambarom's efforts. It was in 1923 that Guadeloupeans of Indian descent were granted citizenship and the right to vote. A few Indians were indentured to Saint Martin (prior to 2007 Saint Martin was a part of Guadeloupe).

After migration stopped, the Indian community gradually acculturated to the rest of the population, so much so that few of the Indians on the island speak Tamil or other Indian languages any more. However, third or fourth generation persons of Indian origin still maintain links with India in many different ways, such as adopting Indian names. Many Indians in Guadeloupe adopted French and Christian names.

There have also been Indians, specifically Sindhis, migrating to the island in recent years, setting up businesses such as gifts shops.

== Current status ==
The city of Basse-Terre in Guadeloupe and Pondicherry in India have been designated as twin cities to promote cultural links and exchanges.

The Indian community in Guadeloupe is estimated to be approximately 35,617 in a population of under 396,000. However, ethnicity statistics are not done by the French government. There are several associations to promote Indian culture in Guadeloupe, usually run by people of Indian origin. They are fairly active in organising cultural activities in all the principal towns, namely, Pointe-a-Pitre, Le Moule, Port-Louis, Capesterre-Belle-Eau and Saint-Claude.

One important Indian association is L‘Association Culturelle Guadeloupéenne des Amis de L’Inde, which has over 300 members and 2000 associates.

There are a sizeable number of Hindu Tamil temples that are located in Basse-Terre, and other regions. Tamils in Guadeloupe started studying their own language in an effort to preserve their culture and traditions. Guadeloupe Tamils initiated links with Tamil Canadians in developing their language and culture.

The French principle of laicité, meaning “secularism”, is practiced in Guadeloupe. The French Republic forces Indian cultural associations to produce messages about Hinduism in Guadeloupe that display Indian culture independently from Hinduism. However, it has proven to be controversial due to the French practice of laique, found in the second article of the French constitution which expresses the principle of separation between government affairs and religious institutions. Indo-Guadeloupeans and Guadaloupean Hindus practice laicité freely in the public arena. There is ongoing controversy since France is a laique state, thus religion is to be practiced privately. According to Meritxell Martín-i-Pardo:

As French citizens, they [Guadeloupean Hindus] know that because France is a laïque state, religious practice is to be a private matter. But this is not to say that religion cannot be practiced freely or legally in France, only that it must be practiced privately. They also know that the separation of church and state, however, means that because the state conceives of religion and culture as two separate entities, in their associative work they must present their religious tradition independently of their culture.

Recently, the 152nd anniversary of the arrival of the Hindus Tamil in Guadeloupe was observed. The Indian Associations in the territory are in the process of forming a committee, which will start working to realize the event.

== Examples ==
Some Indo-Guadeloupians have acceded to important posts in the public and private sectors. Dr. Henri Bangou held the post of Senator from Guadeloupe in the French Senate. Ernest Moutoussamy has been the Député of Guadeloupe in the National Assembly of France.

== Notable people ==
- Indira Ampiot (born 2004), Miss France 2023
- Clémence Botino (born 1997), Miss France 2020
- Samuel Moutoussamy (born 1996), French-born Congolese professional footballer
- Marie Mahabir (born 1962), professional bodybuilder
- Ernest Moutoussamy (born 1941), politician
- Henry Sidambarom (1863–1952), activist
- Lotus Vingadassamy-Engel (1946–2026), poet, lyricist, and professor of French literature of the 18th century

== See also ==
- Indo-Caribbean
- Indo-Martiniquais
- Indians in French Guiana
- Indians in France
- Tamils in France
- Indian diaspora
- Tamil diaspora
- Telugu diaspora
- Hinduism in Guadeloupe
