= Burmann =

Burmann or Bürmann is a surname. Notable people with the surname include:

- Gottlob Burmann (1737–1805), German poet and lipogrammatist
- Pieter Burmann the Younger (1714–1778), Dutch philologist
- Pieter Burmann the Elder (1668–1741), Dutch classical scholar
- Hans Heinrich Bürmann (died 1817), German mathematician
- Sigfrido Burmann (1891–1980), Spanish art director
- Wilhelm Burmann (1939–2020), German dancer
- Wolfgang Burmann (born 1940), Spanish art director

== See also ==
- Burman
- Buurman
