= Barun Burman =

Indian cricketer (born 1954)

Personal information
- Born: 5 November 1954 (age 72); Calcutta, West Bengal, India
- Batting: Right-handed
- Bowling: Right-arm fast-medium
- Role: Bowler

Domestic team information
- Years: Team
- 1972/73–1986/87: Bengal

Career statistics
Competition	FC	List A
Matches	54	11
Runs scored	817	101
Batting average	17.38	14.42
100s/50s	2/0	0/0
Top score	101*	44
Balls bowled	7,495	522
Wickets	146	7
Bowling average	29.36	47.42
5 wickets in innings	5	0
10 wickets in match	0	n/a
Best bowling	7/56	2/39
Catches/stumpings	23/–	2/–
- Source: ESPNcricinfo, 5 March 2016

Barun Burman (born 5 November 1954) is an Indian former first-class cricketer who represented Bengal from 1972 to 1986. He was a right-arm fast-medium bowler, regarded as "probably the fastest bowler Bengal has ever produced". After retirement, he became a coach and then a selector.

== Life and career ==
Born on 5 November 1954 in Calcutta, Burman made his first-class debut at the age of 17 playing for AN Ghosh XI in the Moin-ud-Dowlah Gold Cup Tournament. He went on to appear in 54 first-class and 11 List A matches, representing Bengal, East Zone, Rest of India and BCCI Board President's XI. He came close to national team selection having been named in the probables list on a few tours, but never made it to the Indian squad. He finished his career with 146 first-class wickets at an average of 29.36.

Burman became a cricket coach after retirement. He started a cricket academy in Kolkata in 2004 called "Barun Burman Cricket Academy" where he organized coaching camps for age-group cricketers. Later the name was changed to "Aditya Barun Burman Academy". He also worked for the Cricket Association of Bengal as a selector on its senior and junior selection committees. He was appointed the chief of junior selection committee in 2008.
