= Yvonne Artaud =

French scholar and artist (1924–2009)

Yvonne Artaud (Lyon, 1924 - Pondicherry, 5 August 2009) was a French educator, ethnologist, psychologist and artist, and was the aide of the thinker and philosopher Medhananda. She was a disciple of Sri Aurobindo and Mirra Alfassa. She became an educator at the International Centre of Education and as an artist, she painted many canvases and wrote poems and plays. Her works are currently stored at the Identity Research Institute in Pondicherry, which she founded in 1978 with Medhanada.

From 1963 she invested in research on the psychology of self-awareness, particularly among pre-school children of South India. She was the author of numerous studies on animal psychology and education of young children and was the creator of many methods of teaching and learning, such as Aurograms, a symbolic language to be used as a means of self-expression and communication for very young children from different language backgrounds.
