= Bonnie Kantor-Burman =

American official in Ohio

Bonnie K. Burman, Sc.D., was the 10th director of the Ohio Department of Aging from 2011 to 2016.

She was appointed to that cabinet-level position in January 2011 by Ohio Governor John Kasich, where she served until her retirement in August 2016. For 15 years, she was the director of the Office of Geriatrics and Gerontology at Ohio State University. From 2007 until January 2011, she was the executive director of the Pioneer Network, a national advocate for nursing home reform.

Dr. Kantor-Burman has a doctorate in health policy and management from the Johns Hopkins Bloomberg School of Public Health.
