= Maïna Kataki =

French-Indian teacher and social worker

- Born: Juliette Pierre-Marie; 1923; Paris, France
- Died: 20 November 2011 (aged 87–88); Pune, Maharashtra, India
- Citizenship: France (1923–1976); India (1976–2011)
- Occupation(s): Feminist, author

Maïna Kataki, née Juliette Pierre-Marie and nicknamed Nishtatai (1923 – 20 November 2011 in Pune, India) was a French-born Indian feminist author based in Pune, India. She is known in the field of postcolonial foreign charity activities in India.

== Early life ==
Kataki was born in Paris. She then moved to Pune in February 1970 after being attracted to the spiritual aspects of Indian culture.

She became an Indian citizen in 1976. where she taught at the university level in slums and villages where she founded the Samarpan Ashram in 1983.

== Bibliography ==
Kataki is the author of La Joie d'Être, which is an autobiographical account of L'Inde Secrète des Villages. It details a young woman's attempt at reforming village practices in relation to medicine. She also wrote Femme de Pierre ou Femme de Chair where she expressed her views on feminism.
