= Bollozzou Bassavalingam =

Indian poet, writer and independence activist (1934 - 2004)

- Born: July 10, 1934; Yanaon, French India
- Died: April 26, 2004 (aged 69)
- Occupations: Playwright; poet; writer; social activist
- Movement: Yanam Merger Movement
- Awards: Sri Akkineni Nageswararao award

Bollozzou Bassavalingam (10 July 1934–26 April 2004) was a poet, writer, independence activist from Yanam. He received Teluguratna title from Government of Puducherry. He used Suvarna Sri as pen name for his works. During Yanam merger movement, he worked as president of French Indian Yuvajana Congress. As per instruction of fellow activist Dadala, he stayed at Yanam and worked to instigate the ideas of merger among Yanam populace and got incurred with some attacks from his opponents.

== Life events ==
He was born on July 10, 1934, at Yanam. In 1973, he obtained a Master of Arts or an M.A. in Political Science from Andhra University and in 1980 he obtained M.A. (French) from University of Karnataka. During 1990s for some time he was principal of Alliance française de Yanaon and taught French coursed. Later, he obtained Sri Akkineni Nageswararao award in the field of Drama. He died on April 26, 2004.

== See also ==
- French India
- Yanam
