= John Burman (cricketer) =

English cricketer (1838–1900)

John Burman (5 October 1838 – 14 May 1900) was an English first-class cricketer, who played one match for Yorkshire County Cricket Club, scoring a duck and a vital 1 not out against Cambridgeshire at Queens Park, Wisbech in 1867. That was his only first-class run, and his only contribution to the game, but it was a heroic innings as he was last man in, and helped Joseph Rowbotham take the score from 76 for 9, to the 91 they needed to complete a one wicket win.

Burman, who was born in Bramham cum Oglethorpe, near Wetherby, Yorkshire, England, also umpired the Roses match at Old Trafford in 1875.

He died aged 61, in May 1900 in Halton, Leeds.
