= Satya Mohan Verma =

Indian poet (born 1933)

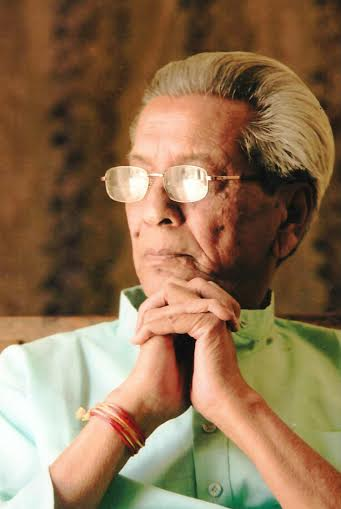
- Born: 18 December 1933 (age 92); Damoh, India
- Education: Saugor University
- Occupations: Writer and Educationist
- Notable work: Vyom Dharma, Vikalp Ka Samikaran, Deewaron Ke Khilaf,

Satya Mohan Verma is an Indian poet. Born in December 1933 at Damoh and named "Mohan" on Mahatma Gandhi by his Gandhian father. Verma completed his studies from Saugor University and chooses teaching as his career. He first came in scene on a kavi sammelan with Vrindavan Lal Verma and then with the motivation of Bhavani Prasad Mishra first joint collection of poems with Vitthalbhai Patel and Dinkar Sonwalkar "Deewaron Ke Khilaaf" was published. He organized the mega literary event "Sarjana-77" the biggest and memorable event in Bundelkhand area. His book on small poems named "Pal Do Pal" was very popular in early 70s. About his another book Vikalp Ka Samikaran Dr. Harivansh Rai Bachhan said that "poems of Satyamohan are as soft as his personality". His book "Vyom-Dharma" gained lot of critical acclaim and became his signature. He did translation of English poems of several famous poets such as Robert Frost, Pablo Neruda etc. in Hindi and "Chintan" the official diary of SPIC MACAY. He also edited the famous book Karm Sanyasi Krishna written by his father. He is the writer of "Bundeli Gaan" 'veer bundeli dharti par pahun pag dhaaro ju' sung by famous singer Vinod Rathore.

His group of Saugor University including Dr. Prabhat Bhattacharya, Vitthalbhai Patel, Jaiprakash Chouksey and more represented the first All India youth festival and met President Dr. Rajendra Prasad and Prime Minister Jawahar Lal Nehru. He spent lot of time with Rajnish Osho in university hostel along with Dr. Kanti Kumar Jain.

His poem Hom kar dee zindagi got him All India Geetayan Award. He is also recipient of many awards such as Paridhi Samman, Rajendra Samman, MICS Award, Hindi Sahitya Sammelan Sagar award and many more. He is the founder principal of Dr. Vijay Lal College Damoh.
