= Ellis Burman =

American make-up artist and sculptor (1902–1974)

- Born: Ellis Burman; May 13, 1902
- Died: April 12, 1974 (aged 71)
- Occupations: Special make-up effects artist, sculptor
- Children: 5, including Ellis Burman Jr. and Thomas R. Burman

Ellis Luis Burman (May 13, 1902 – December 4, 1974) was an American television and film special make-up effects artist and sculptor. He is best known for his work in the films Unknown Island, The Wolf Man, The Spider Woman, The Ghost of Frankenstein, and for the War and Victory sculpture in Lincoln, Nebraska.

== Early life and education ==
Burman was born on May 13, 1902, in Toledo, Ohio. He attended the Art Institute of Chicago.

== Career ==
In the late 30s, Burman moved to California. He was hired by Universal Pictures to work on The Ghost of Frankenstein where he designed Lon Chaney’s head, along with the make-up and props for the film.

== The War and Victory and other sculptures ==
Burman created the War and Victory sculpture cast in crushed marble, as a monument to the veterans of World War I. Along with War and Victory, he created the sculptor Pioneer Woman in cast concrete, both in Antelope Park, Lincoln, Nebraska. Smoke Signal in Pioneers Park is a memorial to the Nebraskan Indians. Burman's sculptures, which he created in his workshop in an idle factory on Y Street in Lincoln, have been erected in various parks and locations around Nebraska.

== Personal life ==
Ellis Luis Burman is the father of Ellis Luis Burman Jr and Thomas R. Burman and the grandfather of Barney Burman and Ellis Luis Burman III.
