= H. L. Verma =

Indian academic

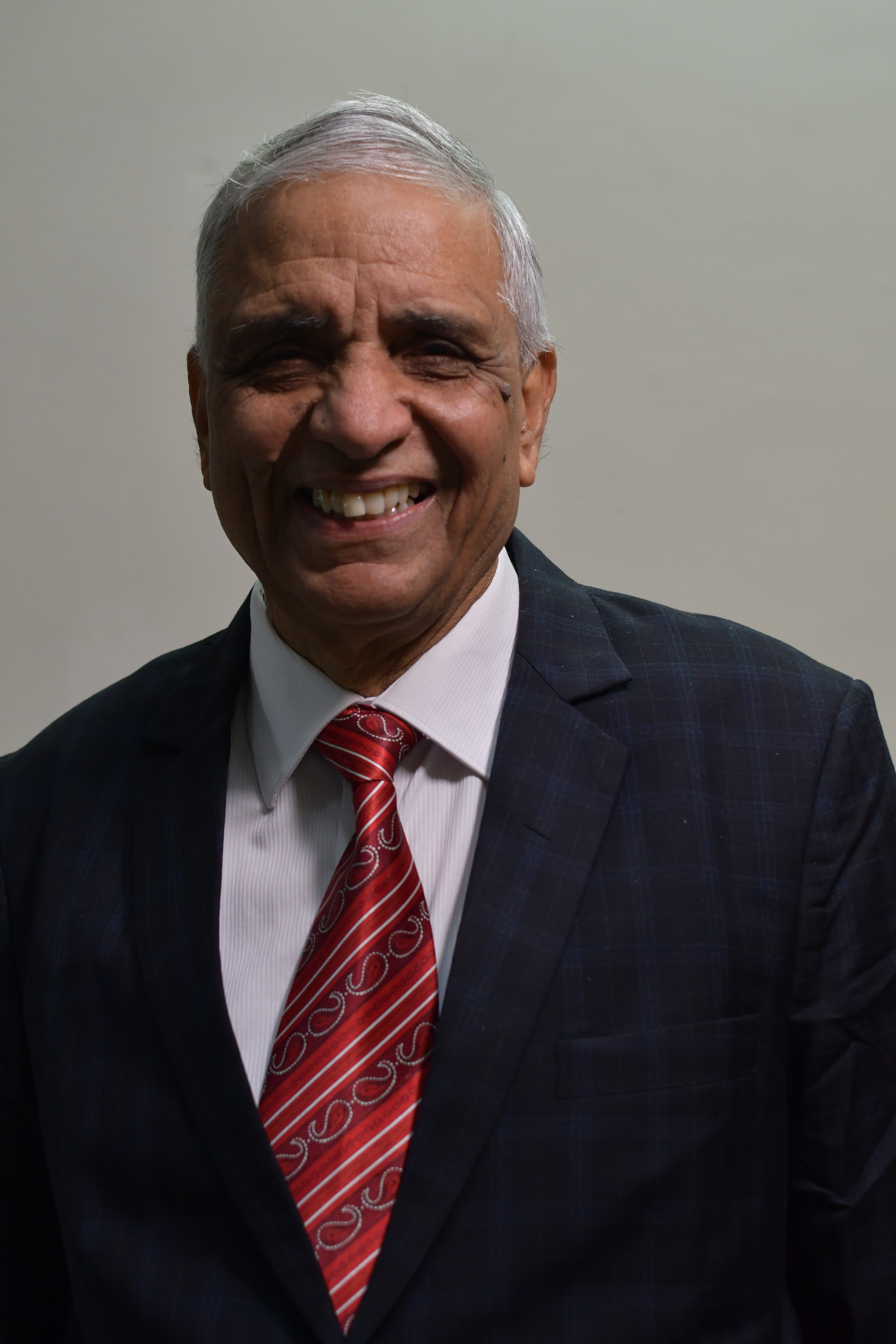
- Professor H.L. Verma in January 2021

Pro VC Guru Jambheshwar University of Science and Technology
- In office 27/09/2000–07/04/2003

Vice Chancellor, Jagan Nath University, Haryana
- In office 07/01/2015–30/09/2020

Pro Chancellor, Jagan Nath University, Haryana
- In office 01/10/2020–29/12/2020

Vice Chancellor (President), Jagan Nath University, Jaipur
- In office 30/12/2020 – March 2024

Vice Chancellor, Baba Mastnath University, Rohtak
- In office April 2024 – Till Date

Personal details
- Born: Harbans Lal Verma; 10 May Sangrur, Punjab
- Children: 3
- Education: Punjabi University
- Occupation: Professor, Vice-Chancellor
- Profession: Teaching, Administration

H. L. Verma is an Indian educational administrator. He previously worked as Vice-Chancellor (2015–20) in Jagan Nath University, NCR. Bahadurgarh, Haryana and President (Vice-Chancellor, 2020–24), at Jagannath University, Jaipur and also served as Vice-Chancellor of Baba Mastnath University (April 2024-2025).

== Early life and education ==
He was born in Sandaur in District Sangrur, Punjab. H. L. Verma is also known as Harbans Lal Verma. He completed his Ph.D. in 1988 on the "Management of working capital in iron and steel industry in India" under the guidance of B.S. Bhatia.

== Career and research ==
He has over five decades of academic experience and has served in various educational institutions in various capacities. He began his teaching career on 2 August 1976 at Patel Memorial National College, Rajpura, Punjab, an affiliated college of Punjabi University, Patiala.

He has also served as Pro Vice-Chancellor (2000-2003), in Guru Jambheshwar University of Science and Technology as Professor & Dean of Management (1996-2013) and Pro- Vice Chancellor (2013-2014), in Apeejay Satya University as a Reader & Head, Department of Commerce Maharshi Dayanand University (1988–96) at Regional Center Rewari now Indira Gandhi University, Meerpur, Rewari.

He was a lecturer in the Department of Commerce Kurukshetra University (1984–88) and served as a lecturer in degree colleges from 1976 to 1984. He authored 12 books and published 63 research papers.

His first book came in 1989 named, Management of Working Capital. He supervised 30 research scholars for their Ph.D. degrees.

== Books ==
- Verma, H. L.; Bhatia, B. S.; Garg, M.C. (1 August 2002). Studies in Human Resource Development (PDF) (1996 ed.). Deep & Deep Publications. ISBN 978-8171007486. Archived from the original (PDF) on 17 January 2017.
  - Vol.1. Understanding HRD – Basic Concepts
  - Vol.2. Dimensions of HRD – Role and Orientation.
  - Vol.3. HRD Practices in India – Assimilation and Implications.
- Verma, H. L.; Kumar, Anil (2007). Women Entrepreneurship In India. Regal Publications. ISBN 978-8189915834.
- Verma, H. L. (2010). Extension Service for Quality Assurance in Technical Education.
- Verma, H. L. (1993). Funds Management in Commercial Banks. Deep & Deep Publications. ISBN 978-81-7100-491-1.
- Verma, H. L.; Bhatia, B. S. (1994). Indian Accounting Standards: an appraisal (PDF). Pointer Publishers, Jaipur. Archived from the original (PDF) on 17 January 2017.
- Verma, H. L. (1994). Developments in Accounting.- in Two Volumes (1994).
- Verma, H. L. (1994). Encyclopedia of Cooperative Management.– in Five Volumes (1994).
  - Vol. 1. Metaphysics of Cooperative Movement.
  - Vol. 2. Cooperatives and Rural Development – Re-energizing Rural Frontiers.
  - Vol. 3. Cooperative Banking - Levers of Rural Economy.
  - Vol. 4. Cooperative Marketing – Prolitarianisation of Distributory [sic] Channels.
  - Vol. 5. Cooperatives and Manpower Development – Tapping Human Resources.
