= Indo-Martiniquais =

Ethnic group in Martinique

Indo-Martinicans
Total population
- 36,123

Regions with significant populations
- Fort-de-France · La Trinité

Languages
- Martinican Creole French, Standard French, Tamil, Telugu, English, Hindi, Sindhi, other South Asian languages

Religion
- Christianity (mostly Catholicism with Protestant minorities), Hinduism, Islam

Related ethnic groups
- Indo-Guadeloupeans · Indo-Caribbean · Tamil diaspora · Telugu diaspora · Tamil people · Telugu people · Indian people · Indian diaspora

Indo-Martinicans (French: Indo-Martiniquais) are an ethnic group of Martinique, compromising approximately 10% of the population of the island. The Indo-Martinicans are descendants of indentured labourers of the nineteenth century from India of primarily Tamil and Telugu descent as well as other Indian groups. They are most concentrated in the northern communes of Martinique, where the main plantations are located. The Indo-Martinicans speak Martinican Creole a French-based creole.

== Migration history ==
In 1851, the Martinique authorities, seeking to replace former slave labourers who had abandoned plantation work on being given their liberty, recruited several thousand labourers from the Indian French colonial settlements of Madras, Pondichéry, Chandernagor and Karaikal. Workers were offered free passage and pay in exchange for serving a five-year period of labour. Despite initial experiences of racial discrimination and labour exploitation, many of the immigrants were subsequently well-integrated into the population, and by the late 20th century the labourers' descendants were broadly assimilated into Martiniquais culture.

The past two decades have seen Indo-Martiniquais people increasingly asserting the distinctively Indian aspects of their heritage (a phenomenon known as "indianité"). People of Indian descent have paid renewed attention to the history and culture of India, and local groups have established contact with peoples of Indian descent from throughout the Caribbean and further afield. One token of this has been the recent revival of a traditional Hindu annual mela on the island, sustained by the Hindu temples and shrines that were introduced by the migrant labourers and remain operational today. There have also been Indians, specifically Sindhis, migrating to the island in recent years, setting up businesses such as gifts shops.

== Culture ==
The majority of Indo-Martinicans follow Christianity with the minority following Islam and Hinduism. The Hinduism in Martinique consists of a variation of popular Tamil Hinduism, which was characterized by the practice of animal sacrifice, the veneration of village deities and the use of the Tamil language as the ceremonial language, although the language has lost its usage in the plantation and post-plantation society.

One of Martinique's most famous dishes, the Colombo, derives from Indian cuisine. The word Colombo derives from the Tamil word குழம்பு- kulambu meaning curry sauce. The dish is a unique curry of chicken, meat or fish with vegetables, spiced with a distinctive masala of Tamil origin, acidulated with tamarind and often containing wine, coconut milk, and rum.

== Notable people ==
- Serge Letchimy - President of Martinique Regional Council
- Lord Kossity - Ragga-zouk musician

== See also ==
- Indo-Caribbean
- France–India relations
- French Indians
- Tamils in France
- Hinduism in Martinique
