= Jhunnilal Verma =

Indian lawyer and politician

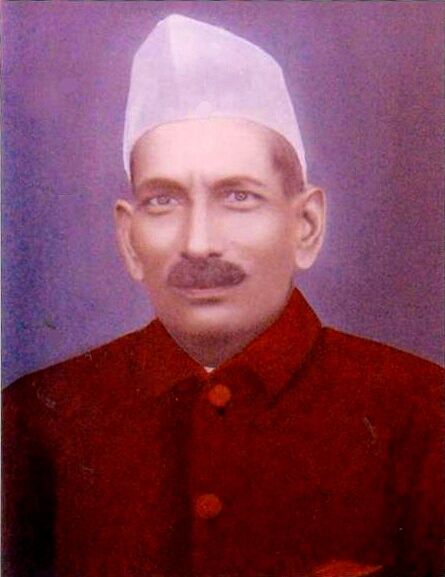
- Born: 26 September 1889; Damoh, India
- Died: 11 December 1980 (aged 91); Damoh, India
- Occupation: Lawyer

Jhunnilal Verma (also Jhunni Lal Verma or J. L. Verma) was an Indian lawyer and politician from Madhya Pradesh. He was freedom fighter from Bundelkhand Damoh region.

In December 1933, Verma was elected unopposed to the Legislative Council of the Central Provinces and Berar, to fill the vacancy caused by the death of G. S. Singhai. He represented the Damoh district non-Muhammadan rural constituency. He was still a member in 1936.

During establishment of Saugor University he was in the team with Dr. Hari Singh Gour and also the founder of Damoh Degree College. J. L. Verma Law College, the law school affiliated with Dr. Hari Singh Gour University was named in his honor. He wrote two books Bharat Darshan and Karm Sanyasi Krishna.
