= List of Hindu temples in France =

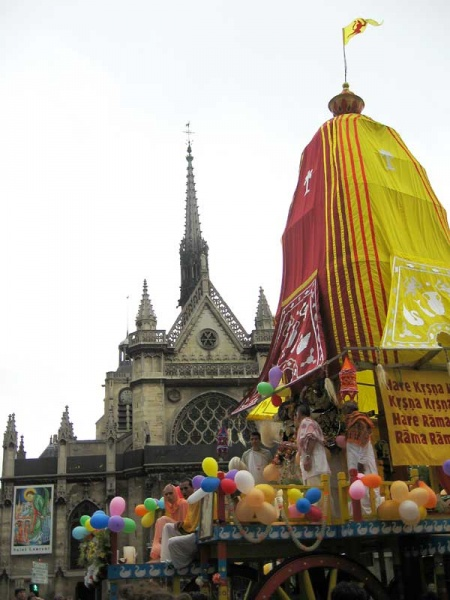
Ratha Yatra in Paris, France.

This is a list of Hindu temples in mainland and overseas France.

== Région Parisienne ==
=== Paris ===
- Ganesha Hindu Temple, 17, rue Pajol, Paris 75018
- Sri Ayyappan Temple, 97 Rue Philippe de Girard, Paris 75018
- Vishwanath Temple, 18 Rue des Petites Écuries, Paris 75010
- Shri Muthukumaraswamy Alayam, 31 Rue des Solitaires, Paris 75019

=== Seine-Saint-Denis ===
- Sri Kamakshi Amman Alayam, 36 Av. de la Division Leclerc, 93000 Bobigny
- Devi Sri Nagabhushana Temple, 8 Av. Henri Barbusse, Bobigny 93000
- Kanapathy Hindu Temple, 90 Rue Emile Zola, La Courneuve 93120
- Parampaariswary Sivan temple, 159 Av. Paul Vaillant Couturier, La Courneuve 93120
- Sivan Parvathi, 159 Avenue Paul Vaillant Couturier, 93120 La Courneuve
- Arul Migu Muthumaariaman, 159 Avenue Paul Vaillant Couturier, La Courneuve 93120

=== Choisy-le-Roi ===
- Sri Sathya Narayana Pathunga Temple, 6-8 Avenue Anatole France, Choisy-le-Roi 94600
- Sri Ashtalakshmi Thevasthanam, 1 bis, Rue Ledru Rollin, Choisy-le-Roi 94600

=== Val-d'Oise ===
- Radha Krishna Temple, 230 Avenue de la Division Leclerc, 95200 Sarcelles
- Sri Durgai Amman Temple Villiers Le Bel,15 Avenue Alexis Varagne, 95400 Villiers-le-Bel

=== Seine et Marne ===
- Sri Visalatchi samedha shivan Temple, 51 Rue de la Gare, Plaisir 78370
- BAPS Mandir Swaminarayan Hindou de Paris BAPS Swaminarayan Hindu Mandir Paris, Allée Madame de Montespan, 77600 Bussy-Saint-Georges, Paris, France

== Lyon ==
- Temple Hindou de Vinayaga Perouman Koil, 3 Place Lyautey, 69140 Rillieux-la-Pape

== Luçay-le-Mâle ==
- ISKCON New Mayapur Temple, Château d’Oublaise, Luçay-Le-Mâle

== La Réunion ==
- Sri Maha Kalakambal Temple, 261 Rue du Maréchal Leclerc, Saint-Denis 97400
