= Cyril Desbruslais =

Indian Jesuit priest

Cyril Desbruslais SJ
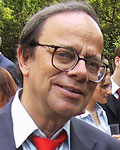
- Born: 21 December 1940 (age 85); Calcutta
- Died: 8 September 2025; Pune, Maharashtra (India)

Cyril Desbruslais SJ (b. 21 December 1940, Calcutta) was an Indian Jesuit priest, a playwright and Professor of Philosophy at Jnana-Deepa, Pune, India. He died in Pune, India, on September 8, 2025, of pneumonia.

== Family Background and Early Life ==
Desbruslais was born in Calcutta, Bengal Presidency, British India, on 21 December 1940. He was born to Cyril and Maisie Desbruslais. He has a sister named after his mother. Another sister, Marina, was born two years later but she died of tuberculosis at the age of eighteen months. Desbruslais has stated, "She has always been my little baby intercessor in heaven. Mum and Dad died, also of TB, in the early 1950s (it was a fatal illness, in those days). We were brought up by a very loving uncle (my Mum's brother)."

Desbruslais was schooled in Calcutta with the Jesuits (St Xavier's), then with the Irish Christian brothers in a boarding school in Asansol. He gained his Bachelor of Commerce at St Xavier's College (Calcutta) and worked for a year at Remington Rand of India, before joining the Society of Jesus. His uncle Vernon Desbruslais was also a Jesuit. He died on September 8, 2025, of pneumonia.

== Searching in Service and Unity (SSU) ==
While studying theology at De Nobili College, Pune, India in 1971, he started a youth group, "Searching in Service and Unity", (SSU).

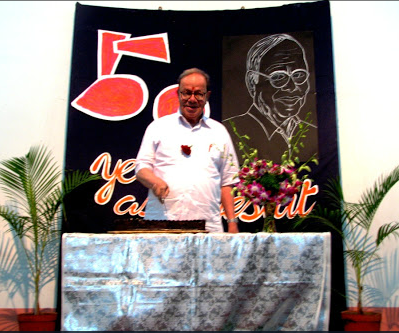
Celebrating 50 years of his Jesuit life at De Nobili College, Pune, India, one of the largest Jesuit communities in the world

== From Liberation Theology to Philosophy of Liberation ==
=== Introduction to Liberation Theology ===
During his theology studies (1971–1974) at JDV, Pune, Desbruslais was introduced to the principles of liberation theology, a movement within the Catholic Church that connects faith with the pursuit of social justice, especially in Latin America. He was deeply moved by its call to interpret scripture and Christian doctrine from the perspective of the oppressed and marginalised. In particular, Desbruslais drew inspiration from the Nicaraguan poet-priest Ernesto Cardenal, who combined artistic creativity with radical commitments to the poor and to social transformation.

As Gustavo Gutiérrez argued, liberation theology was not simply a re-statement of traditional doctrine with a few social emphases, as in Jürgen Moltmann’s Theology of Hope. Rather, it represented a new theological method, what Gutiérrez called “a theologising from the underside of history.” Desbruslais encountered these ideas while studying in Pune, where he began to reflect on how theology could engage with India's complex religious and social context.

=== Philosophy of Liberation in the Indian Context ===
Desbruslais observed that India was 98.5% non-Christian, and thus concluded that liberation theology could at best mobilise only a small minority of the population for faith-based social action. Instead, he argued that what was needed was a united commitment to justice and liberation that could involve Indians of all religions, rooted in a shared vision of human dignity.

Building on the 1975 Synod of Bishops, which affirmed the “inseparable link between authentic faith and action for justice,” and on the deliberations of General Congregation XXXII of the Society of Jesus, Desbruslais developed a distinctive approach he called a “philosophy of liberation.”

Drawing from the scholastic philosopher Francisco Suárez SJ's idea of “common human nature, adequately understood,” he articulated four constitutive dimensions of being human: (1) embodiedness, (2) social relatedness, (3) rootedness in the world, and (4) capacity for transcendence. For Desbruslais, it was not strictly necessary to profess belief in God to be fully human. Rather, what mattered was openness to transcendence and a willingness to work for justice and community across religious and cultural boundaries.

In lectures and publications such as Dancing to Diversity: Science, Religion, Dialogue in India (2013), he consistently highlighted the intersection of faith and reason, arguing for a philosophy that serves the marginalised and fosters dialogue among different traditions.

His thinking left an indelible mark on both religious and secular leaders in India. Shashi Tharoor, a former Minister of External Affairs, recalled Desbruslais as an inspiring teacher at St. Xavier's College, Kolkata. Retired General Shankar Roychowdhury, former Chief of Army Staff, also acknowledged Desbruslais's formative influence on his intellectual and moral outlook.

== Plays ==
Desbruslais has written and directed yearly plays with current social themes since 1972. Believing that theatre can change mindsets and attitudes, his plays tackle subjects including nuclear disarmament, globalisation, terrorism, consumerism and religious dogma. "Through the messages embedded in our plays, SSU is promoting out-of-the-box thinking among the young and is abating - if not removing - hatred that's making us all such violent beings," he says Some of his plays include:

- The Impossible Dream (1972)
- Pilgrim of the Future (1973)
- Eschaton (1974)
- No plays (1974 - 1977)
- The Promised Land (1978)
- Boy and Girl (1978)
- Two By Two (1979)
- No. No, Jeremiah (1981)
- The Prince of Whales (1983)
- Dateline Jerusalem (1987)
- Inigo (1990)
- Even to the Indies (1993)
- Pedro (1995)
- Camillo (1997)
- The Ballad of Nestor and Cecy (1997)
- Excelsior (2000)
- Carry on Boy and Girl (2002)
- Boy and Girl Forever (2004)
- It's Great to Be Young (2006)
- Change your Habit (2008)
- Against the Tide (2010)
- The White Rose (2012)
- A. T. (2014)
- Adam and Eve (2015)
- Esperanza (2016)
- Roses in the Sea (2017)
- Giddyap Gideon (2018)
- Two By Two (2019: Revised, repeat performance!)

== Books ==
- Desbruslais, Cyril (1989). Interpretations of transcendence. Pune: Jnana Deepa Vidyapeeth. OCLC 34670453.
- Desbruslais, Cyril (1997). Pandikattu, Kuruvilla (ed.). The philosophy of the human person: an introduction to philosophical anthropology. JDV text book series. Vol. 2 (2nd ed.). Pune: Jnana Deepa Vidyapeeth. OCLC 65417894.
- Desbruslais, Cyril (1997). Pandikattu, Kuruvilla (ed.). The philosophy of be-ing: introduction to a metaphysics for today. JDV text book series. Vol. 3 (2nd ed.). Pune: Jnana Deepa Vidyapeeth. OCLC 65417895.
- Desbruslais, Cyril (2012). Röttig, Paul F. (ed.). Unser Vater: Gespräche mit Gott im Osten und Westen [Daddy darling: talks with God in East and West] (in German). Perchtoldsdorf, DE: Plattform. ISBN 978-3-9503295-0-6.
- Desbruslais, Cyril (2015). Business Advice from an Artist: 1. (with Aaron Brachfeld et al)
- Desbruslais, Cyril (2016). The Philosophy of Liberation:: Revisiting Genuine Religious Experiences with Special Reference to Christianity.
- Desbruslais, Cyril (2017). Collected Deepak Morris: Business Advice from an Artist AND I have to Eat and Sleep. (with Aaron Brachfeld et al)
- Desbruslais, Cyril (2019). The Philosophy of God:: Faith and Traditions.
- Desbruslais, Cyril (2019). Postmodernity:: An Indian Christian Philosophical Appraisal.
- Desbruslais, Cyril (2021). Ancient, Medieval and Modern Philosophy: A Historical Introduction (500 BC-1800 AD).

== Tributes/Obitury ==
On his 80th birthday, his colleagues and well-wishers brought out a festschrift in his honour. Its title represent's Desbruslais' life-long dream of enabling a world where everyone, including the marginalised and exploited, can lead a life "fully human and full alive."

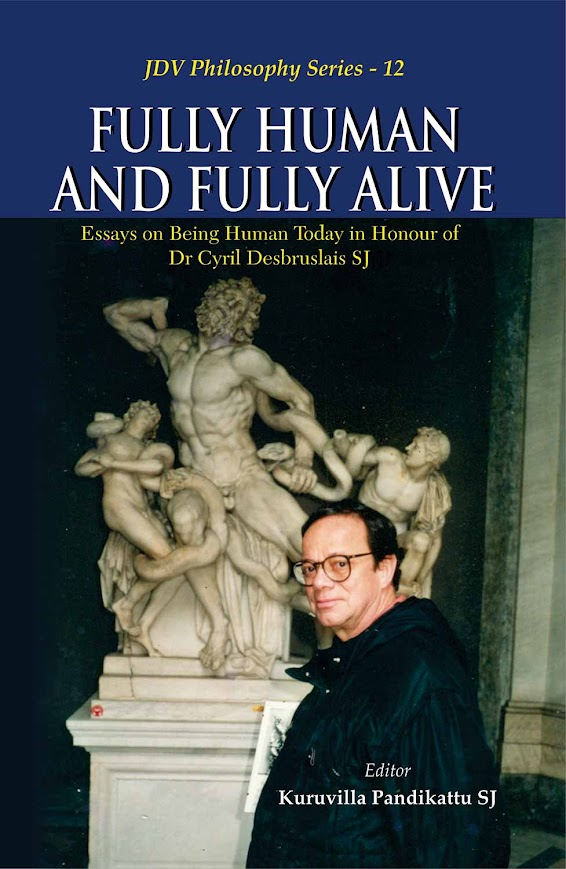
Book Cover in Honour of Prof Cyril Desbruslais

On his death on September 8, 2025, many have paid him rich tribute. They see him as a mentor and role model. Honorable Shashi Tharoor recalls how young Desbruslais influenced him at St. Xavier's College, Kolkata and how he continued to influence many young men at Jnana Deepa, Pune.
