= Ellis Burman Jr. =

American special make-up effects artist (1935–2020)

- Born: 1935
- Died: 2020 (aged 84–85)
- Occupation: Special make-up effects artist

Ellis Burman Jr. (1935–2020) was an American television and film special make-up effects artist best known for his work in the films Back to the Future, the Star Trek series, The Terminator, and Gargoyles. He has two Emmy Awards for make-up: Star Trek: Deep Space Nine and Gargoyles. He has eight Emmy nominations.

== Early life and education ==
Ellis "Sonny" Burman Jr. was born in Nebraska, the son of Ellis Luis Burman and his wife Dorothy. His father and mother met as students at the Chicago Institute of Art. His father was a sculptor. He has a brother Tom and three sisters.

In 1937, during the Depression Era, Ellis Luis Burman, his wife Dorothy, and their two sons, Ellis Jr. and Tom, moved to Santa Monica, where Ellis began working in sculpture, prop creation and miniatures for films. Dorothy Burman, also an artist, worked together on some projects. The brothers grew up around their father’s studio, playing with the monster masks he created for films including Lon Chaney’s Frankenstein and Wolfman, and learning the craft of makeup and special effects.

== Career ==
Ellis "Sonny" Burman Jr. and Tom began working on makeup and special effects for Los Angeles motion picture studios. They went into business together, setting up a studio for their makeup and special effects jobs.

In 1972, Burman Jr. collaborated with makeup artists Del Armstrong and Stan Winston on the CBS television film Gargoyles, designing and applying prosthetic creature makeup. At the time, credits were not listed on-screen for make-up artists so Winston insisted that he, Burman Jr., and Armstrong receive proper credit for their contributions, or he would leave the production otherwise. As a result, all three artists were credited on-screen, and their work on Gargoyles earned them a Primetime Emmy Award for Outstanding Achievement in Makeup in 1973.

== Personal life ==
Burman Jr.'s nephews included Rob Burman and Barney Burman, who also entered the makeup effects field. According to Rob Burman, Rob's father gave him his first job in the industry by inviting him to assist with mold cleaning during the summer of 1976, marking the start of Rob’s career in special effects.
