= Pauli Burman =

Finnish politician (1933–2012)

Finnish politician and journalist Pauli Burman (1933-2012).

Pauli Kalevi Burman (2 January 1933 – 1 January 2012) was a Finnish journalist and politician, born in Helsinki. He was a member of the Parliament of Finland from 1966 to 1970 and from 1974 to 1975, representing the Social Democratic Party of Finland (SDP). He was a presidential elector in the 1968 Finnish presidential election.
