= Mahendra Verma =

Indian physicist

Mahendra Kumar Verma
- Born: 27 May 1966 (age 60)
- Education: Indian Institute of Technology Madras (B.Tech. 1988), University of Maryland, College Park (Ph.D. 1994)
- Scientific career
- Fields: Turbulence, fluid mechanics
- Workplaces: Indian Institute of Technology Kanpur
- Thesis: Magnetohydrodynamic turbulence models of solar wind evolution (1994)
- Website: https://sites.google.com/view/mahendra-verma/

Mahendra Kumar Verma (born 27 May 1966) is an Indian physicist and professor at the Indian Institute of Technology Kanpur who works on fluid dynamics, turbulence, and nonlinear dynamics. Verma earned his bachelor's degree in computer science from the Indian Institute of Technology Madras in 1988, and a Ph.D. in physics from the University of Maryland, College Park in 1994. He was awarded the Swarnajayanti Fellowship by the Department of Science and Technology, Government of India in 2006, and the Dr. A. P. J. Abdul Kalam Cray HPC award, which honors high-performance computing contributions from India, in 2018. He is also an elected fellow of the Indian National Science Academy and the Indian Academy of Sciences.
