= Sidharth Burman =

Indian billionaire businessman (1944/5–2015)

- Born: Siddhartha Roy Burman; 1944/45
- Died: 28 October 2015
- Occupation: Businessman
- Children: Saket Burman; Sumati Burman

Sidharth Burman (1944/45 – 28 October 2015) was an Indian billionaire businessman. Son of the late Rattan Chan Burman, his net worth is derived from his residual stake in Dabur, founded by his grandfather SK Burman.

He had two children, a son Saket Burman, who is a director of Dabur, and a daughter Sumati, who is married to the property billionaire Chandru Raheja's son Ravi.

He died on 28 October 2015.
