= Saket Burman =

British billionaire (born 1976/7)

- Born: 1976 or 1977 (age 49–50)
- Citizenship: British
- Education: University of Wisconsin–Madison
- Occupation: Businessman
- Board member of: Dabur International
- Parent(s): Sidharth Burman; Indira Burman

Saket Burman (born 1976/77) is a British billionaire.

Burman has a bachelor's degree in marketing and finance from the University of Wisconsin–Madison. He is the son of Sidharth Burman, who died in 2015, when he inherited a 12.4% stake in Dabur, the Indian consumer goods company. His mother is Indira Burman.

Burman is a director and vice-chair of Dabur International.

He has homes in Dubai, London and Delhi.
