= Tamils in France =

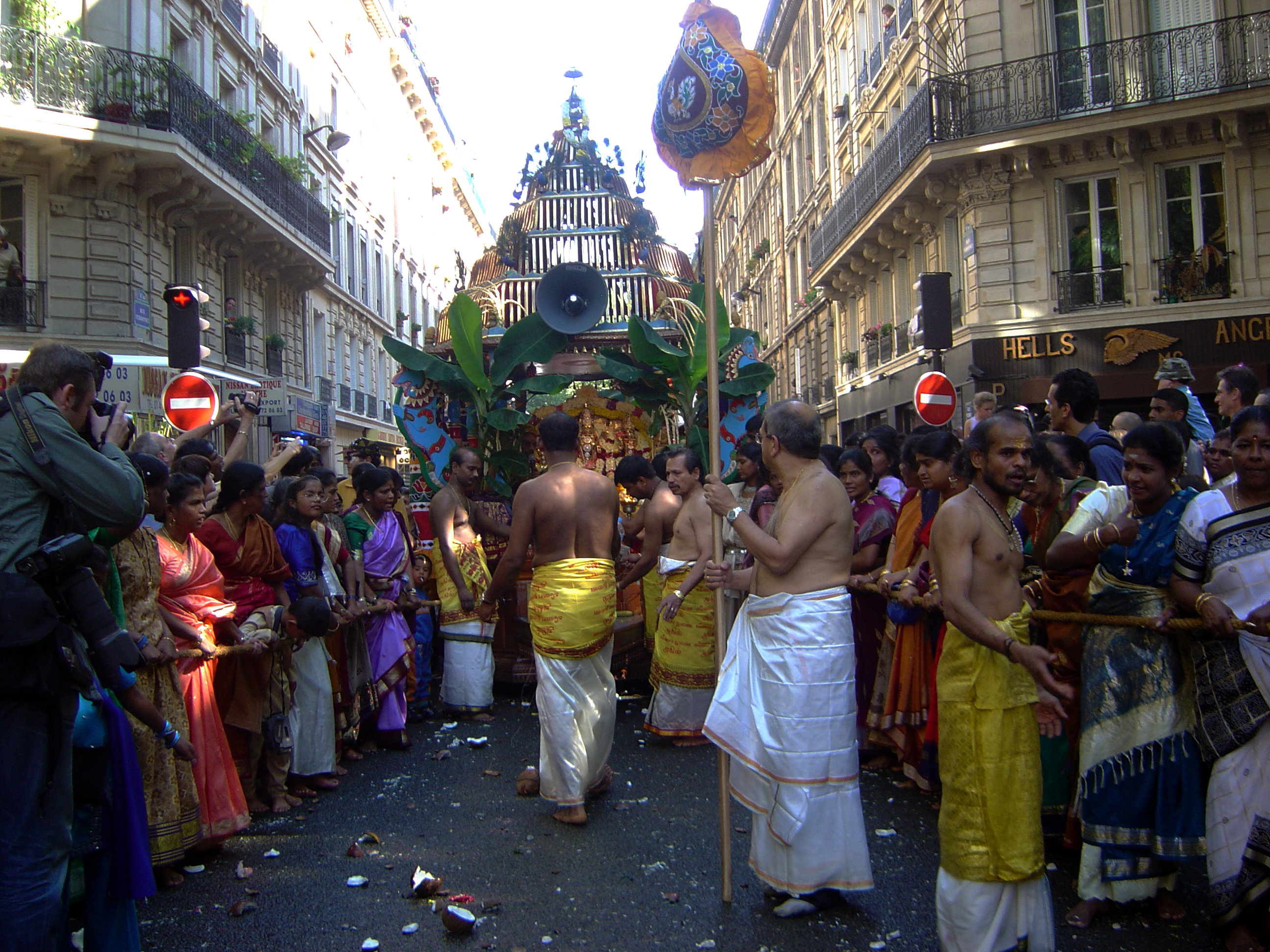
- Religious Procession of Tamils

Total population
- 100,000 in Overseas DOM-TOM Réunion, French Guiana, Martinique

Regions with significant populations
- Réunion; Martinique; Guadeloupe; French Guiana; Overseas departments and territories of France

Languages
- Tamil, French, Antillean French Creole, French Guianese Creole, Réunion Creole, Mauritian Creole, English

Religion
- Hinduism, Roman Catholicism, Islam

Related ethnic groups
- Indians in France, Sri Lankans in France, Tamils in Germany, Tamils in Switzerland, Tamils in Italy, British Tamils, Maltese Tamils, Tamils in Ireland, Tamil Canadians, Tamil Singaporeans

Tamils in France refers to the citizens as well as expatriate residents of Tamil origin living in France. Over 100,000 Tamils from both Indian states of Tamil Nadu and Pondicherry now (Puducherry) and then from Sri Lanka also lives in France. This is in addition to the Indian Tamil community established in French overseas dominions of Réunion, Martinique, Guadeloupe, and French Guiana. There are approximately 220,000 people of Tamil origin on the island of Réunion.

== History ==
The earliest Tamil immigration into France can be traced back to since the 17th Century, from the French-administered colony of Puducherry in India. A large number of them hailing from middle-class families who joined the French government on service.

In the 1790s the French East India Company sent most of the Indian Tamils from Tamil Nadu and Puducherry to France and Réunion for workers and after some years they were permanently settled and makes an residence there itself.

The later arrivals were mostly Tamils from Sri Lanka, who fled the country during the violence in 1983 and the Civil War that succeeded it. As of 2008, there were approximately 50,000 Sri Lankan Tamils living in France, with the majority of them residing in Paris.

Until 1991, the population of Tamils in Paris was not concentrated in any particular area. However, Parisian Tamils began to form groups on and around Northern Rue du Faubourg Saint-Denis. Following the growth of the Tamil presence around the street, local businesses which were owned by the Parisian Tamil quickly populated the area. A tribute to Ganesha the Hindu elephant god, is well received by both the Tamil and overall Parisian community alike.

== Culture ==
=== Language ===
Apart from speaking Tamil their native language, most of the Tamils are fluent speakers of English due to their British colonial past. Many of the early migrants had struggled to find work and higher education due to their relatively lesser understanding of the French. As a result, many of them have taken up free and paid classes to learn French. A critical demand is that the French government create special work-training programs designed to orient refugees from different fields.

=== Religion ===
The majority of the Tamil French population are either Hindus or Christians, and a minor number of them have faith in Islam as well.

=== Preservation ===
In an effort to maintain and preserve the Tamil culture, there are schools in the community which open on weekends to educate the local youth on religion, along with traditional dances and music of the Tamil.

== Little India ==
Passage Brady, nicknamed “Little India”, is divided in two by Boulevard de Strasbourg. Covered on one side, it is open on the other. There are numerous boutiques and restaurants specialising in Gujarati, Tamil and Punjabi cuisine.

== Little Jaffna ==
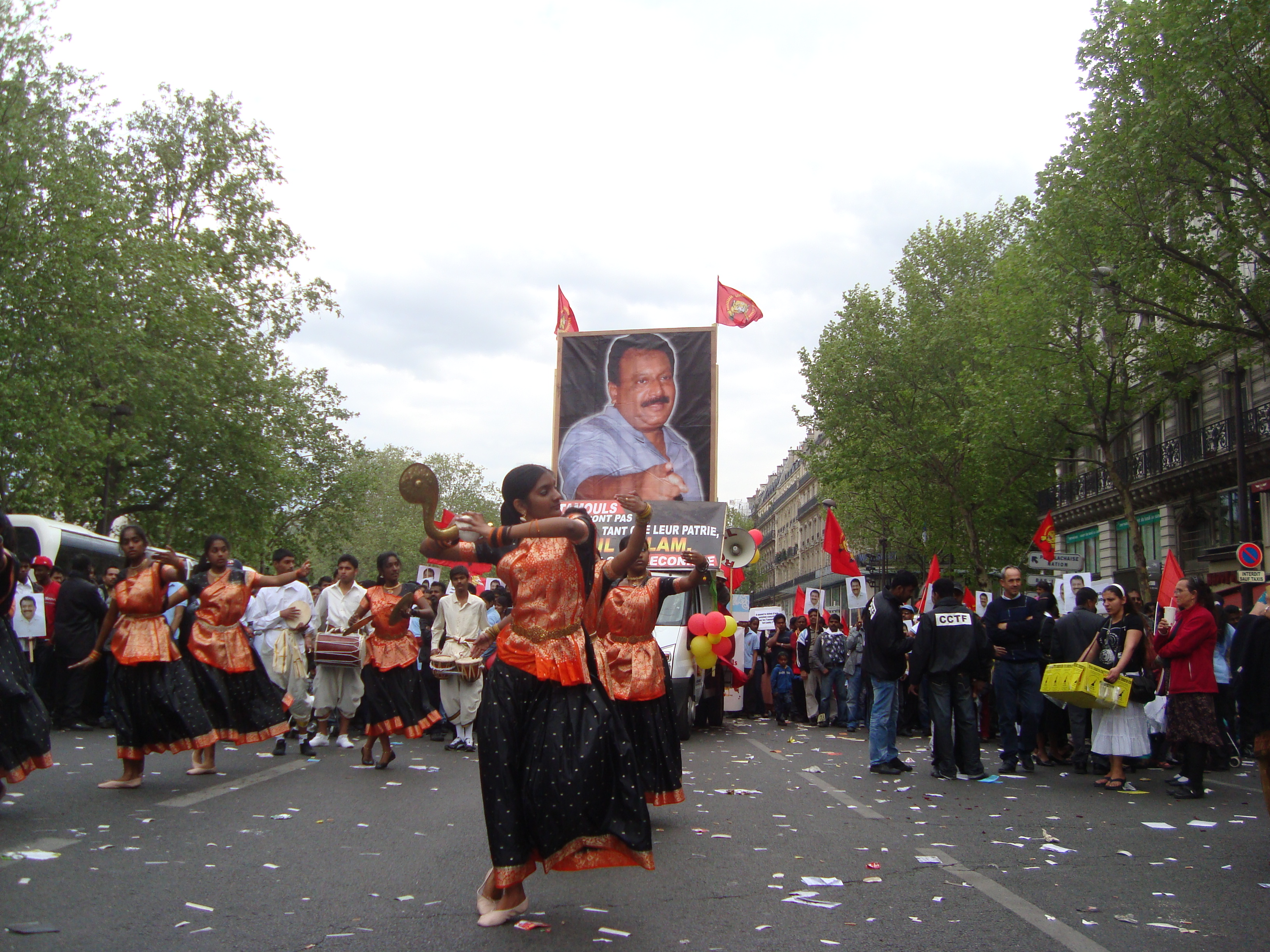
Tamil dancers take part in the May day rally in Paris, 2010

The Parisian quarter of La Chapelle, a short distance from Le Gare du Nord is popularly known as “Little Jaffna”. It centers on three of four streets where the famous annual Ganesh Festival and its crowd drawing processions of dancers, rituals and floats has been celebrated at the end of August each year since the late 1990s.

The majority of the residents are Sri Lankan Tamils who fled Sri Lanka from persecution in the 1980s, which also saw the beginning of the country's civil war. It is commonly mistakenly called by the average Parisian as Little India.

There is a wide variety of stores, restaurants and businesses catering to Parisian Tamil community. There are numerous boutiques selling saris, restaurants specialising in Tamil, Indian and Sri Lankan cuisine and Halal butchers and spice stores. There are shops selling models of Hindu, Buddhist and Christian deities such as trinkets and jewellery. Translation, visa, educational and other services also line the streets.

Both the area and local events have become popular tourist attractions. Little Jaffna is a bustling village, offering a perspective on Tamil culture which has been noted by visitors that is seemingly isolated from larger French influences.

== See also ==
- Malbars, a Tamil ethnic group in Réunion
- Indo-Martinicans
- Tamil diaspora
