= Paresh Maity =

Indian painter (born 1965)

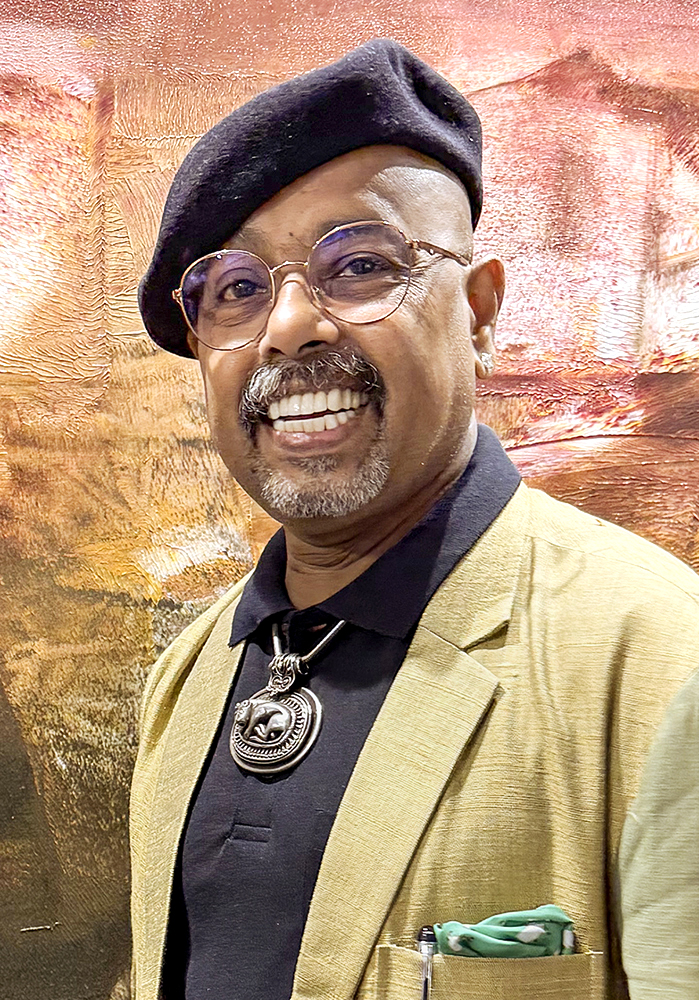
- Paresh Maity at Art Exhibition 2025, Mumbai
- Born: 1965 (age 60–61); Tamluk, Purba Medinipur, West Bengal, India
- Known for: Painter, Sculptor, Photographer and Filmmaker
- Awards: Padma Shri (2014)
- Website: pareshmaity.com

Paresh Maity (born 1965) is an Indian painter. He is a prolific painter in a short career span. In 2014, Government of India conferred upon him its fourth-highest civilian award the Padma Shri.

== Early life ==
Paresh Maity was born into Mahishya Family to Tamluk, Purba Medinipur, West Bengal. He has a degree in Fine Arts from the Government College of Art & Craft, Kolkata and graduated at the top of his class with a Masters of Fine Arts from the Delhi College of Arts.

=== Education ===
- B.V.A. Government College of Art & Craft, Kolkata
- M.F.A. College of Art, New Delhi

== Career ==
Paresh Maity has 81 Solo Exhibitions in forty years of his career. In early years he did many watercolors of different locations. He gradually moved from atmospheric scenery to representations of the human form. His more recent paintings are bold and have graphic quality, with a strong color and unusual cropping. His works are in a number of collections, including the British Museum, and the National Gallery of Modern Art, New Delhi.

He has painted the longest painting in India, that stretches up to over 850 feet. In August 2010, his 55th solo show with watercolour paintings based on the last 15 poems of poet Rabindranath Tagore, Shesh Lekha (The Last Writings, 1941), opened at the National Gallery of Modern Art, New Delhi.

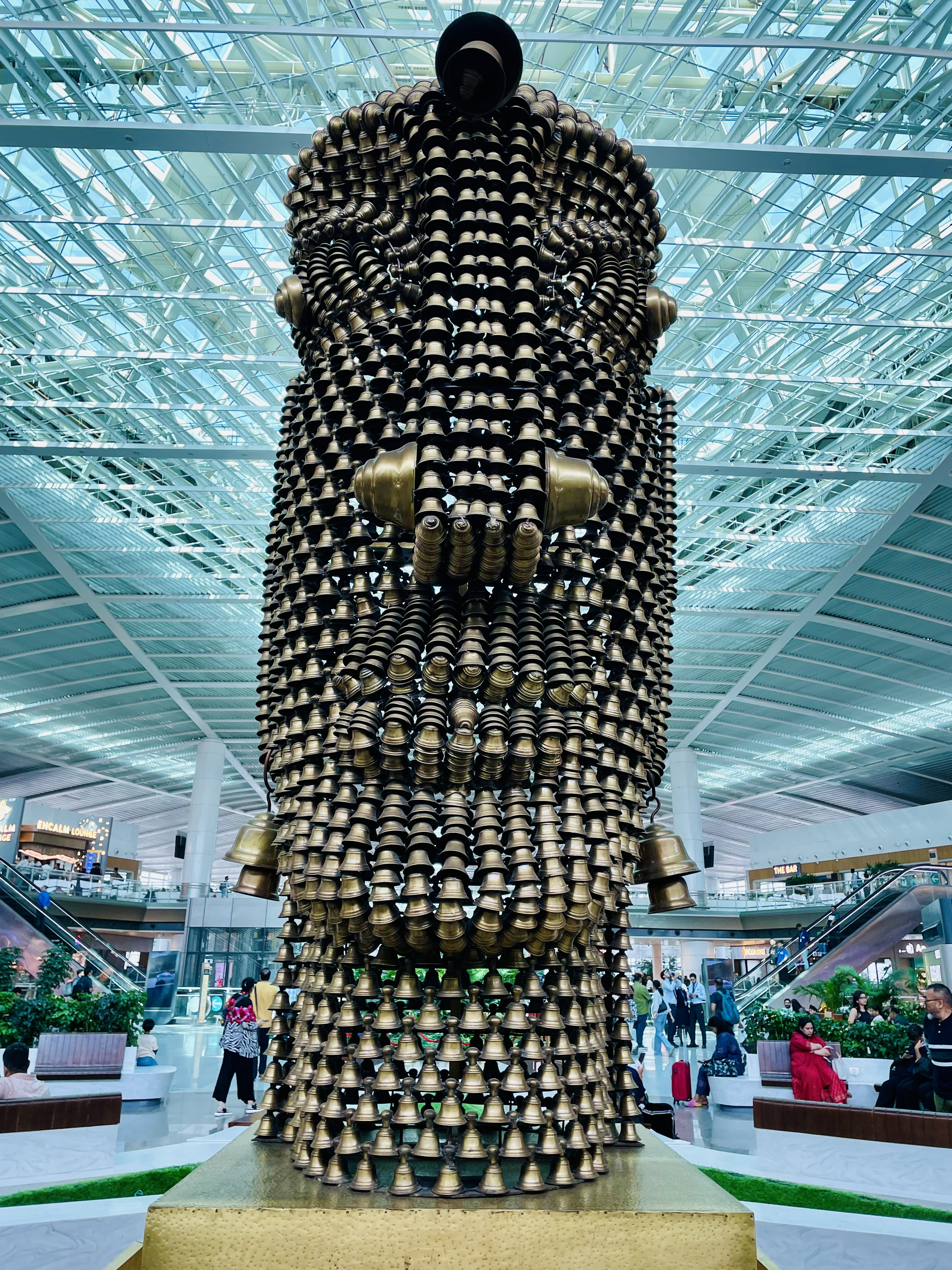
Sound of Silence, art installation at Delhi Airport's Terminal 1 by Paresh Maity

=== Personal life ===
He is married to artist Jayasri Burman, and lives and works in New Delhi.

== Awards ==
Year	Award or honour
2017	Award from the Government of Bihar
2016	Eastern Eye Editor’s Special Award for contribution to art, Royal Festival Hall, London
2014	Padma Shri awarded by the Government of India

—
