= Jayasri Burman =

Indian artist (born 1960)

- Born: Jayasri Burman; 21 October 1960 (age 66); Kolkata, West Bengal, India
- Education: Kala Bhavan, Shantiniketan (1977–1979); Government College of Art & Craft, Kolkata (M.A. Painting); Graphic Art Workshop (Paul Lingren); Printmaking course, Paris (Monsieur Ceizerzi)
- Alma mater: Kala Bhavan, Shantiniketan; Government College of Art & Craft, Kolkata
- Known for: Painting; Sculpture; Printmaking
- Style: Contemporary; Figurative; Mythological symbolism; Folk-inspired visual language
- Movement: Contemporary Indian art
- Spouse: Paresh Maity

Jayasri Burman (born 21 October 1960, in Kolkata) is a contemporary painter and sculptor from India. She is based in New Delhi, India.

== Education ==
She studied at the Kala Bhavan in Shantiniketan from 1977 to 1979, and at the Government College of Art and Craft, Kolkata, where she completed a Master of Arts in Painting. She took a Graphic Art Workshop conducted by Paul Lingren and a formal course on Print making in Paris from Monsieur Ceizerzi.

== Personal life ==
She married to painter and sculptor Paresh Maity.

== Exhibitions ==
=== Mediums and themes ===
Her primary painting mediums are watercolours, ink, charcoal and acrylic on canvas. Most often centring on nature, gods and goddesses, her original depictions combine folk, myth and mythology to tell stories of deities who braved adversities.

=== 2021, River of Faith, Art Exposure, Bikaner House, New Delhi ===
Strongly influenced by spiritual beliefs and sacred texts, Burman expresses her creativity with poetic lyricism that is part fairytale and part organic. The Ganga river has had an indelible impact on her and she has painted the river in myriad forms with allegorical elements like swans, flowers, vines, fish and more. The recent devastation and destruction of the waters of the river as an aftermath of the pandemic greatly stirred her and ultimately culminated in River of Faith.

The genesis of being in this exhibition must begin with the 4 sculptures that traverse generations of legends stories and mythical renderings.

River of Faith, Art Exposure, Kolkata

"River of Faith, a tribute to the Ganges which is the life force of India, connecting its inhabitants across space and time. In her imagination, the Ganga assumes many forms, embodying both fantasy and reality, fertility and ferocity, origin and annihilation, hope and despair. Her unique stylisation creates a visual language that allows for exciting new modes of perception."

The spatial arrangement of this Jahnavi that runs into 36' in two diptychs coincides with constructivist ideas and theoretical discussions on the expressive power of monochromatic moods and moorings created with dense charcoal in thicker passionate contours of controlled compositional spaces. From the beginning of her days of pedagogy Jayasri has believed that colours and lines have independent symbolic meanings, and they presented a spiritual flow of imagery: Contours create space, development, and mood, whereas flowing filled lines represent time, extension, and deep thought.

2020 Shakti - Nine Forms of Divinity, on-line show, Gallery Art Exposure, Kolkata

2018 Born of Fire: A Tale for our Times, AICON Gallery, New York In Draupadi, artist Jayasri Burman sees a feminist icon who should be remembered for her keen political skills, self-determination, and relatability. Simultaneously monumental and detailed, the Draupadi works reimagine the visual history of the Mahabharata without forgetting the traditions that birthed them. Pulling from a vast coffer of Hindu mythos, Burman reimagines traditional depictions of female goddesses by imbuing them with bright color and energy.

2015 Antaryatra - A Journey Within, Birla Academy of Art & Culture, Gallery Sanskriti, Kolkata

2014 Lila, Jehangir Art Gallery, Art Musings, Mumbai

Gazing Into The Myth, Gallery Sumukha, Bangalore Jayasri has admitted that she always found folk art inspiring. She is able to see and discover vital and organic links between mythical icons and their folk expressions. This discovery, in turn, goes into making some of her works to be what they are – visual sites where the classical and the folk merge to create a lively sense of the contemporary. It is not a contemporaneity all by itself; lonely and isolated, though moments of loneliness and isolation could also be discerned. It is an inclusive contemporaneity which is continuous with the past. To revert to the reigning metaphor, it is a flowing contemporaneity, which cuts across barriers of time.

Fables and Folklore, Art Musings, Mumbai

2009 A Mythical Universe, Art Alive Gallery, Lalit Kala Akademi, New Delhi

2006 Sacred Feminine, Art Musings Gallery, Mumbai

2005 Arts India Gallery, Palo Alto, San Francisco

Selected Group Exhibitions

2023

- Times of India's Art of India, Snowball Studios, Mumbai

2021

- Traditions in Transition, Gallerie Ganesha, New Delhi
- The Drawing Show Part II, Gallery Sumukha, Bangalore

== Awards and honours ==
Year	Award or recognition	Ref.
1979	Awarded by the College of Visual Arts in Tempera for outstanding merit in its annual exhibition	
2007	Participated in the "Ananya Festival", organised by the Ministry of Women and Child Development for International Women's Day. Burman designed commemorative stamps released by the Vice President of India.	
2016	Awarded by the Government of West Bengal for creating the Durga Puja idol for Behala Notun Dal in Kolkata	
