= Berman =

Berman is a surname that may be derived from the German and Yiddish phrase בער מאַן (lit. ‘bear-man’) or from the Dutch Beerman, meaning the same. Notable people with the surname include:

- Abba Berman (1919–2005), Polish-Israeli Rosh Yeshiva
- Adolf Berman (1906–1978), Polish-Israeli activist and politician
- Ahmet Berman (1932–1980), Turkish football player
- Alan Berman (born 1943), American psychologist, psychotherapist, and suicidologist
- Alexander Johan Berman (1828–1886), Dutch minister and literary critic
- Amanda Berman, civil rights attorney; founder and executive director of Zioness
- Amy Berman (born 1954), circuit judge
- Antoine Berman (1942–1991), French translator and theorist of translation
- Arthur L. Berman (1935–2020), American lawyer and politician from Illinois
- Bart Berman (born 1938), Dutch-Israeli pianist
- Bob Berman, American astronomer
- Boris Berman (chekist) (1901–1939), Worker of the USSR State Security officials, Commissioner of Public Security the third rank
- Boris Berman (journalist) (born 1948), Soviet and Russian journalist and broadcaster
- Boris Berman (musician) (born 1948), Russian-Israeli-American pianist
- Brian Berman, American family physician
- Bruce Berman (born 1952), American film producer
- Chris Berman (born 1955), American sportscaster
- David Berman (graphic designer), Canadian graphic designer
- David Berman (mobster) (1903–1957), American mobster
- David Berman (musician) (1967–2019), American poet and vocalist
- Debbie Berman, South African film and television editor
- Dianne Goldman Berman Feinstein (1933–2023), American politician
- Emma Berman (born 2008), American actress
- Eugène Berman (1899–1972), Russian painter
- Franklin Berman (born 1939), British barrister, judge, and arbitrator
- Fred Berman (1926–2011), American painter
- Gail Berman (born 1956), American manager in the movie industry
- Geoffrey Berman (born 1959), American attorney
- Harold J. Berman (1918–2007), American professor of law
- Harris Berman (c.1938–2021), American physician
- Helen Berman (born 1936), Dutch-Israeli painter
- Helen M. Berman (born 1943), American chemistry professor
- Henry Berman (1914–1979), American film editor
- Howard Berman (born 1941), American politician
- Ilan Berman (born 1975), Vice President of the American Foreign Policy Council
- Iosif Berman (1892–1941), Romanian photographer, and journalist
- Jakov Berman (1868–1933), Russian philosopher
- Jakub Berman (1901–1984), Polish politician
- Jekuthiel Berman (1825–c. 1889), Russian Hebrew novelist
- Jennifer Berman, American sexual health expert, urologist, and female sexual medicine specialist
- John Berman (born 1972), American news anchor
- Joost Berman (1793–1855), Dutch judge and poet
- Josh Berman, American writer and producer for television
- Joshua Berman, Professor of Bible at Bar-Ilan University
- Jules Berman (1911–1998), American businessperson
- Julie Berman (born 1983), American actress
- Julius Berman (1935–2025), American lawyer and rabbi
- Karel Berman (1919–1995), Czech vocalist and composer
- Karen Berman, American psychiatrist and physician-scientist
- Karl Berman (senior) (1811–1885), German clarinettist and basset horn player
- Laura Berman, American sex therapist and educator
- Lazar Berman (1930–2005), Russian pianist
- Leah Berman (born 1976), American mathematician
- Len Berman (born 1947), American sportscaster, journalist, news anchor and author
- Leo Berman (1935–2015), Texas state Representative
- Léonide Berman (1896–1976), Russian painter
- Lori Berman, former Florida state Representative
- Lyle Berman (born 1941), American poker player
- Marshall Berman (1940–2013), American philosopher and writer
- Matvei Berman (1898–1939), Russian, Head of the GULAG 1932–1937
- Maxine Berman (1946–2018), American educator and Michigan state Representative
- Mitch Berman (born 1956), American fiction writer
- Mitchell Berman (politician) (born 1986), U.S. Representative-elect from Wisconsin
- Mitchell N. Berman, American Professor of Law at the University of Pennsylvania Law School
- Monty Berman (1913–2006), British cinematographer and film and television producer
- Morris Berman (born 1944), American historian
- Nathaniel Berman, American historian
- Nechemia Berman, Chief Rabbi of Uruguay
- Nina Berman, American photographer
- Otto Berman (1891–1935), American accountant
- Pandro S. Berman (1905–1996), American film producer
- Paul Berman (born 1949), American writer
- Paul Schiff Berman (born 1966), American lawyer
- Pavel Berman (born 1970), violinist and conductor
- Rick Berman (born 1945), American television producer
- Richard Berman (born 1942), American corporate lobbyist
- Richard M. Berman (born 1943), American federal judge
- Rodney Berman (born 1969), Welsh local government politician
- Rosalind Berman (died 2012), American politician
- Ruth A. Berman, Israeli linguist
- Ryan Berman, Michigan state Representative
- Sabina Berman (born 1955), Mexican writer and journalist
- Sanford Berman (born 1933), American librarian
- Saul Berman (born 1939), American rabbi and educator
- Serena Berman (born 1990), American actress
- Shanik Berman (born 1965), Mexican journalist and entertainer
- Shelley Berman (1925–2017), American entertainer
- Sheri Berman (BA 1987), American political scientist
- Simon Berman (1861–1934), Dutch mayor
- Steve Berman, American writer
- Tal Berman (born 1973), Israeli TV host and radio broadcaster
- Thijs Berman (born 1957), Dutch politician
- Wallace Berman (1926–1976), American artist
- Yitzhak Berman (1913–2013), Israeli politician

== See also ==
- Berman and Company, Washington DC–based public affairs firm
- Berman v. Parker
- Robinson, Silverman, Pearce, Aronsohn, and Berman, New York–based law firm
- Neuberger Berman, New York–based investment management firm
- Beerman
- Behrmann
- Behrman
- Bearman
- Biermann
- Noah Baerman (born 1974), American jazz pianist
- Carl Baermann (1810–1885), German clarinetist and composer, son of Heinrich Baermann
- Heinrich Baermann (1784–1847), German musician
- Gottfried Bermann (1897–1995), German publisher, known as Gottfried Fischer
