= Birman (surname) =

Birman is a surname. Notable people with this surname include:

- Alexandre Birman, Brazilian footwear designer
- Igor Birman, Russian-American economist
- Inessa Birman, Israeli female former volleyball player
- Joan Birman (born 1927), American topologist, specializing in braids and knot theory
- Joel Birman, Brazilian psychiatrist and psychotherapist
- Joseph L. Birman, American theoretical solid-state physicist
- Ken Birman (born 1955), American computer scientist, specializing in resilient distributed systems
- Len Birman (died February 10, 2023) was a Canadian-American actor
- Lisa Birman, Australian poet and novelist
- Mikhail Birman (1928–2009), Russian mathematician
- Naum Birman (1924–1989), Soviet director of theater and cinema, screenwriter
- Serafima Birman (1890-1976), Soviet and Russian actress, theatre director and writer

== See also ==
- Berman
- Bierman
- Biermann
- Burman
