= Boris Berman =

Boris Berman may refer to several people, including:

- Boris Berman (chekist) (1901–1939), Soviet NKVD member active during the Great Purge
- Boris Berman (journalist) (born 1948), Russian journalist and broadcaster
- Boris Berman (musician) (born 1948), Russian pianist
