= Lanny =

Lanny is a masculine personal name attributed as a variation of Laurence (bay tree) or Roland (from the renowned land) and may refer to:

== People ==
- Lanny Bassham (born 1947), American sports shooter, 1976 Olympic champion
- Lanny Berman (born 1943), American psychologist, psychotherapist, and suicidologist
- Lanny Boleski (c. 1941–1997), retired Canadian Football League player
- Lanny Breuer (born 1958), American lawyer and former Assistant Attorney General for the Criminal Division of the U.S. Department of Justice
- Lanny Cordola (born 1961), American guitarist
- Lanny Davis (born 1945), American lawyer
- Alan O. Ebenstein (born 1959), American political scientist, educator and author
- Lanny Fite (born c. 1950), American politician
- Lanny Frattare (born 1948), American former sportscaster
- Lanny Gare (born 1978), Canadian-born German professional ice hockey player
- Lanny McDonald (born 1953), Canadian former National Hockey League player
- Lanny Meyers (born 1956), American composer, orchestrator, principal arranger and musical director
- Lanny Morgan (born 1934), American jazz alto saxophonist
- Lanny Poffo (1954-2023), Canadian-American professional wrestler
- Lancelot Lanny Ross (1906-1988), American singer, pianist and songwriter
- Lanny D. Schmidt (1938–2020), American chemist
- Lanny Steele (1933-1994), American jazz pianist
- Lanny Thomas, American politician
- Jerry Lanston Lanny Wadkins (born 1949), American golfer
- Lanny Wolfe (born 1942), American Christian music songwriter

== Fictional characters ==
- Lanny Budd, protagonist of 11 novels by Upton Sinclair
- Lanny Lloyd, main character in Lanny, a novel by Max Porter
- Lanny Parker, a character in Pair of Kings
