= Yekutiel =

Yekutiel (Sephardi and Modern Israeli pronunciation) or Yekusiel (Ashkenazi pronunciation) - יקותיאל in Hebrew letters - is a Biblical Hebrew name. It may refer to:

== First name ==
- Yekutiel Adam (1927–1982), Israeli general
- Yekutiel Berman (1825–c. 1889), Russian Hebrew writer
- Yekutiel Gordon, 18th century Kabbalist and physician from Vilna
- Yekusiel Yehuda Teitelbaum (I) of Sighet (1808–1883)
- Yekusiel Yehuda Teitelbaum (II) (1911–1944), Chief Rabbi of Sighet
- Zalman Leib Teitelbaum, born Yekusiel Yehuda Teitelbaum (III) (b. 1952), Satmar Rebbe
- Yekutiel Gershoni, Israeli historian and a former paralympic champion
- Yekutiel, another name of Moses in Jewish tradition

== Surname ==
- Gal Yekutiel (born 1981), Israeli judoka
