= Beerman =

Beerman is a surname. Notable people with the surname include:

- Albert Christiaan Willem Beerman (1901–1967), Dutch politician
- Coert Beerman (born 1955), Dutch businessman
- Leonard Beerman (1921–2014), American Rabbi
- Miriam Beerman (1923–2022), American painter and printmaker
- Myles Beerman (born 1999), Maltese footballer

== See also ==
- Berman
- Elder-Beerman, American chain of department stores
