= Runyon Canyon Park =

Park in Los Angeles

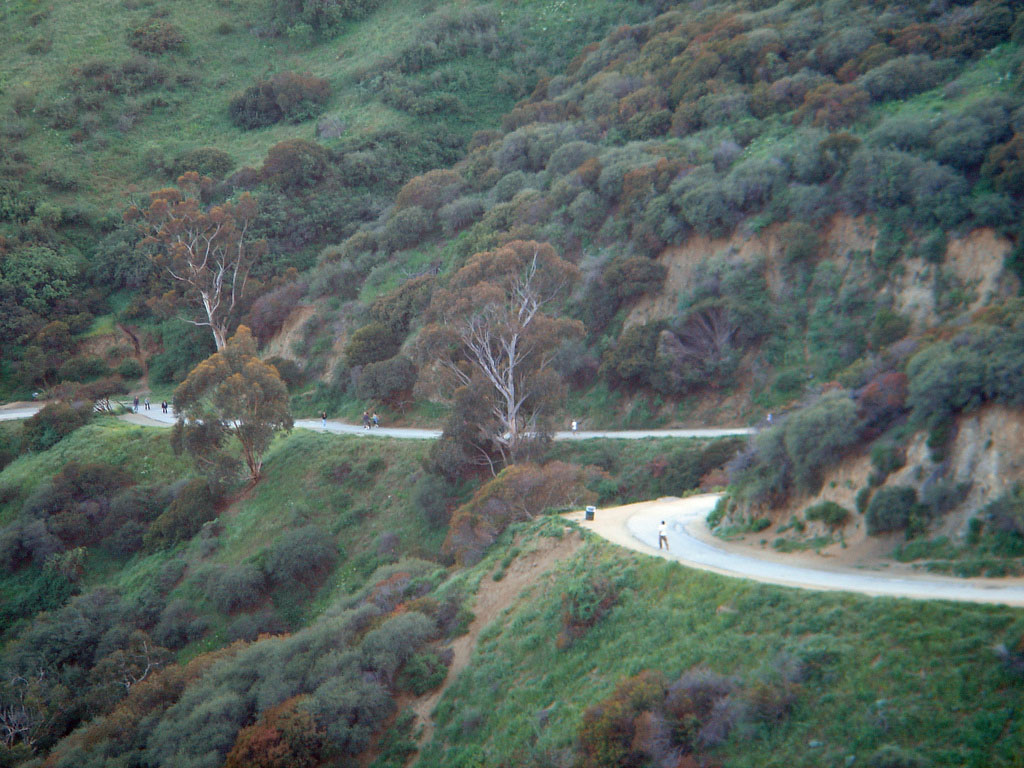
- Paved path between Vista Street & Mulholland Trailhead

- Location within the Los Angeles metropolitan area Location within California Location within the United States
- Type: Urban park
- Location: Hollywood, Los Angeles, California
- Coordinates: 34.11°N 118.35°W
- Area: 160 acres (65 ha)
- Created: 1984; 42 years ago
- Operator: Los Angeles Department of Recreation and Parks
- Status: Open all year

Runyon Canyon Park is a 160-acre (65 ha) park in Los Angeles, California, at the eastern end of the Santa Monica Mountains, managed by the Los Angeles Department of Recreation and Parks. The southern entrance to the park is located at the north end of Fuller Avenue in Hollywood. The northern entrance is off the 7300 block of Mulholland Drive. The Runyon Canyon Road, a fire road that is closed to public motor vehicle access, runs roughly through the center of the park between the northern and southern entrances along Runyon Canyon itself, and there are numerous smaller hiking trails throughout the park. The highest point in the park at an elevation of 1,320 ft (402 m) is known as Indian Rock. Because of its proximity to residential areas of Hollywood and the Hollywood Hills, celebrity sightings are common. The park is also noted for having a fairly liberal dog policy, with dogs allowed off-leash in 90 of the park's 160 acres (0.65 km^{2}). The park is part of the Santa Monica Mountains National Recreation Area. Following the January 2025 fires, the park was temporarily closed but was partially reopened at the end of February. As of August 2025, part of the west trail is still closed.

== History ==
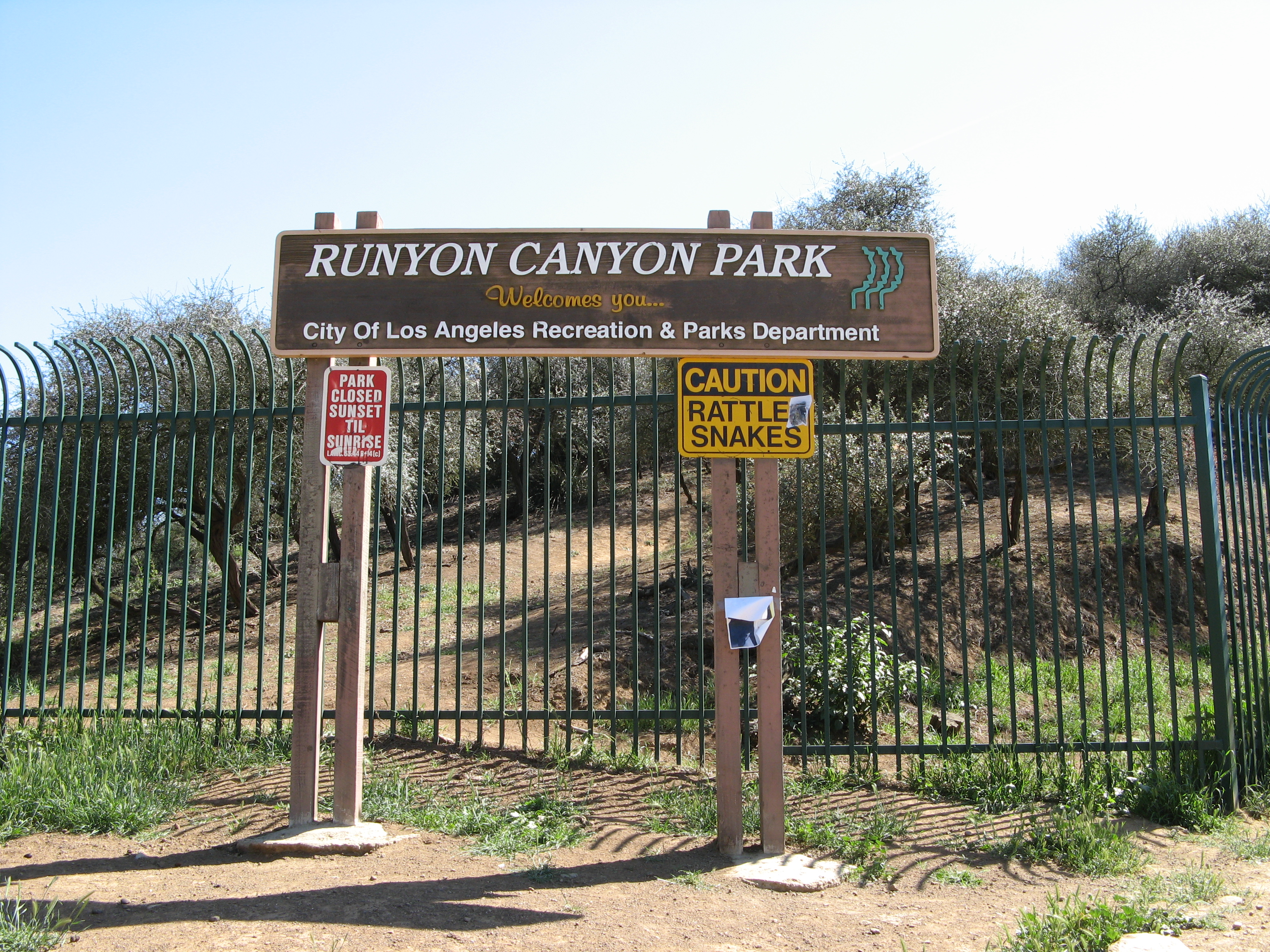
Park Entrance in 2007

Runyon Canyon Park was purchased in 1984 from its last private owners, Adad Development, for use as a city park by the Santa Monica Mountains Conservancy and the City of Los Angeles. "No Man's Canyon" was the English name given to the gorge which lies above Franklin at Fuller Avenue, and extends north to Mulholland Drive. It is reputed to have been a seasonal campsite for local Gabrielino/Tongva Indians, who hunted in the area known to them as the Nopalera.

In 1867, "Greek George" Caralambo, AKA Allen, received the 160-acre (65 ha) parcel by federal patent in appreciation for his service in the US Army Camel Corps. Allen became famous by association when the bandit Tiburcio Vasquez was captured while hiding out at his home in 1874.

Alfredo Solano, a prominent civil engineer, civic leader, symphony patron and one of the founders of the Los Angeles Athletic Club, purchased the canyon a year after Vasquez was hanged in 1876. Solano held the canyon as an investment before his widow, Ella Brooks Solano, sold the majority of the land to Carman Runyon in 1919. Runyon, having recently retired from a successful coal business in the East, came out with his new bride to enjoy the California climate. The marriage failed and Runyon moved to Hollywood where he met and married Ellen Hunt. The new Mrs. Runyon was an accomplished horsewoman and the Runyons purchased the canyon to use for riding and hunting. They built a small bungalow near the Fuller Avenue entrance.

Runyon lent his name to the canyon, the road and Carman Crest Drive before he sold the estate in 1930 to John McCormack, the world-famed Irish tenor. McCormack had fallen in love with the estate whilst filming Song O' My Heart there in 1929. The film was an early "talkie" and McCormack's salary for the picture went to purchase the property and build the mansion he called "San Patrizio", after Saint Patrick. He and his wife lived in the mansion until they returned to England in 1938. Remains of terraced gardens and buildings are visible below the Vista gates.

McCormack toured frequently and in his absence the mansion was often rented out to such celebrities as Janet Gaynor and Charles Boyer. The McCormacks made many friends in Hollywood, among them Errol Flynn, Will Rogers, John Barrymore, Basil Rathbone, C. E. Toberman and the Dohenys. After his farewell tour of America in 1937, the McCormacks deeded the estate back to Carman Runyon, expecting to return at a later date. World War II intervened, however, and, McCormack's health was broken by a wartime concert tour. McCormack died in 1945.

In the meantime, Huntington Hartford, heir to the A&P Grocery fortune and patron of the arts, purchased the property in 1942, moving into the mansion and renaming the estate "The Pines". He commissioned Frank Lloyd Wright and his son Lloyd Wright, who had offices in Hollywood, to draft ambitious plans for developing the estate. These included a "cottage hotel" lower canyon and a futuristic "play resort" country club on the ridge. When neighborhood opposition to the design put the project on hold, Hartford had Lloyd Wright design and build a pool pavilion on the crest of the hill at Inspiration Point, facing Hollywood. Schemes were later proposed for galleries in the canyon, but after 1955, Hartford began to spend more time in New York where his Gallery of Modern Art was eventually built. In the mid '40s, Hartford wrote an adaptation of Jane Eyre called "Master of Thornfield," which ran for two weeks in Cincinnati and starred Errol Flynn as Mr. Rochester. This partnership led to Flynn staying in the pool-house briefly in 1957–58, and is the origin of a legend that "The Pines" was Flynn's estate.

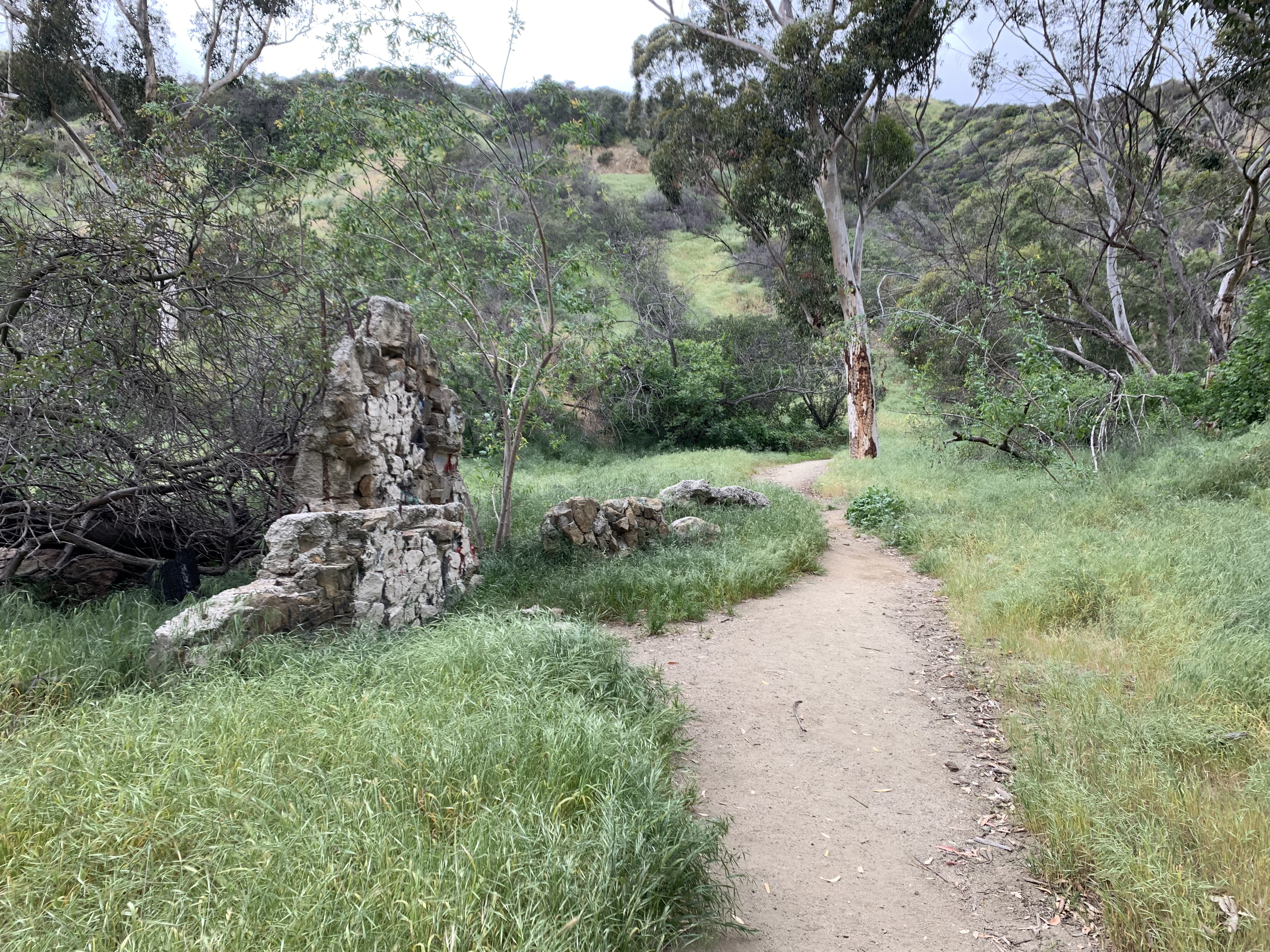
Ruins of old structures can still be found in the park.

In 1964, Hartford offered the property as a gift to the city, but this was turned down by Mayor Sam Yorty.

Jules Berman, who had made a fortune importing the well-known Mexican coffee-flavored liqueur Kahlúa, saw the estate potentially as a "Tiffany development, a beautiful subdivision of 157 luxury homes." After purchasing the canyon, he razed San Patrizio and the guest houses to avoid paying taxes on the deteriorating structures. His "Huntington Hartford Estates" development, trading on the name of its famous former owner, encountered resistance led by Daniel deJonghe, a park activist. The project was stopped in 1978 before building could begin. The Lloyd Wright pool-house remained standing until 1972 when a fire in the canyon destroyed all but its natural stone foundations.

Between 1994 and 1999, two parallel subway tunnels for the Metro Red Line were mined underneath the park. The tunnels run approximately from the southeast corner to the northwest corner of the park boundaries and are located deep underground.

In March 2007, The Trust for Public Land purchased 14.9 acres (6.0 ha) of private land on Runyon Canyon for $8.75 million on behalf of the City of Los Angeles and the Mountains Recreation Conservation Authority. This ensured that the popular Runyon Canyon would remain open for public use and views unobstructed by development. Funding sources include: Los Angeles County Prop A, Santa Monica Mountains Conservancy Prop 1, City of Los Angeles Prop K, Friends of Runyon Canyon, California Natural Resources Agency, EEMP, California Department of Parks and Recreation Stateside, and Land and Water Conservation Fund (LWCF).

== Walks and trails ==
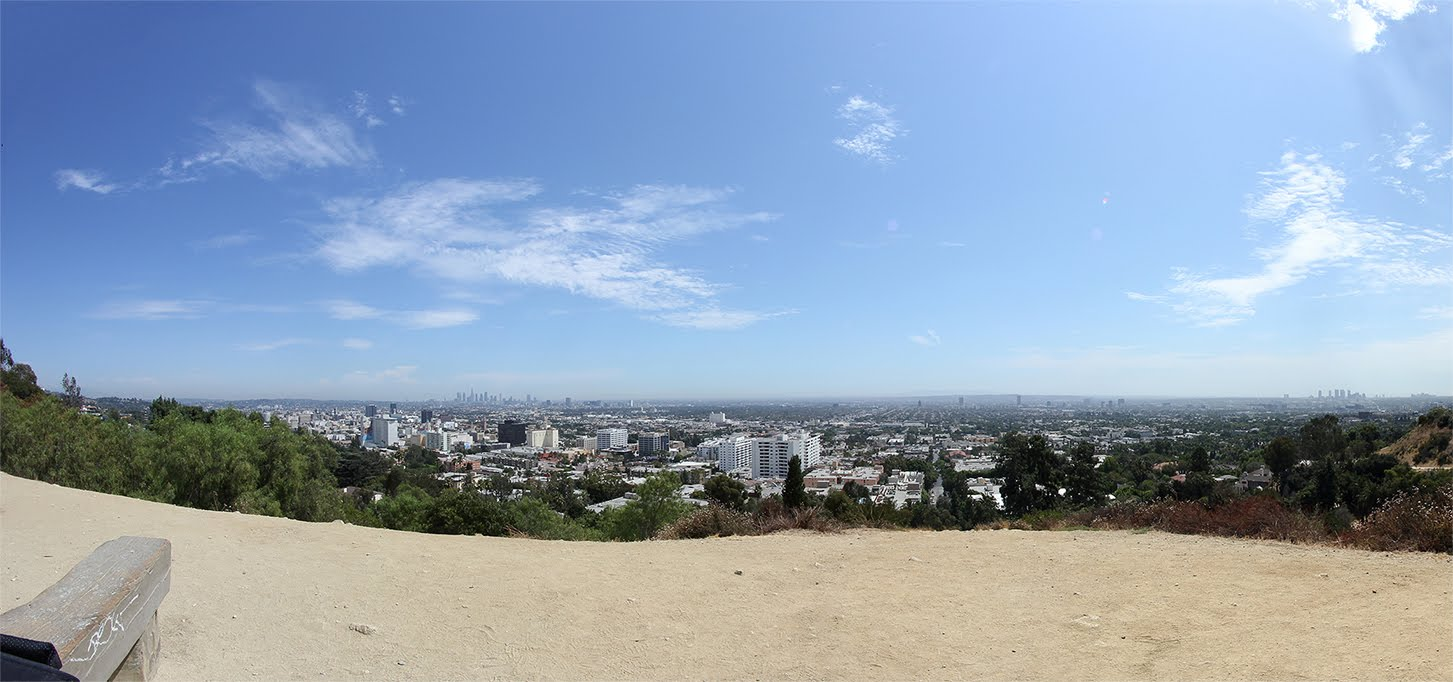
View towards Downtown Los Angeles from Inspiration Point

There are five ways to enter Runyon Canyon: two gates at the bottom of the park in the south at Fuller and Vista Streets; a gate at the top of Runyon Canyon Road at Mulholland Drive on the north side of the park, a gate at northwest end of the park at Solar Drive by the trail on West Ridge, and a spine-ridge footpath from the top of Wattles Garden. The trailhead on Mulholland Drive has a parking area while the other trailheads rely on street parking.

There are three routes to hike Runyon Canyon from the Fuller Gate—Runyon Canyon Road (easy), the Star Trail (medium), and the Hero Trail (difficult). Runyon Canyon Road is a gradual climb on a passably paved road, as one heads South to North towards the back of the Canyon. The Road swings around to the east ridge to the panoramic Clouds Rest and then comes down the medium-steep slope and famed railroad-tie steps of the Star Trail to the mid-level Inspiration Point, before taking the fire road past the run-down tennis court back down to the Fuller Gate. Doing this route in reverse back up Star Trail is a much more energetic climb up the steps and steep slopes between Inspiration Point and Clouds Rest. These loops take about 30–45 minutes.

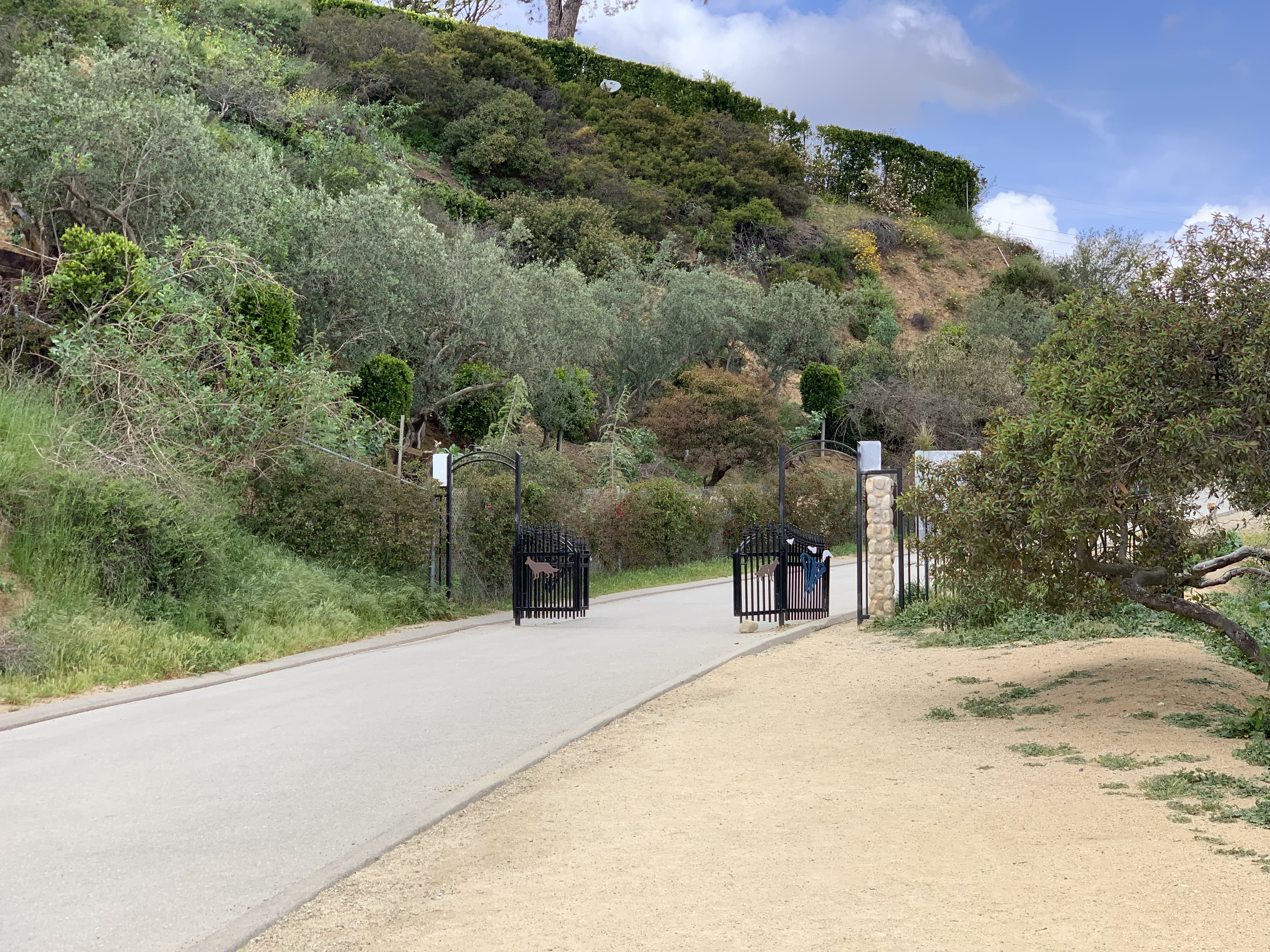
Some of the park's trails, including Runyon Canyon Road pictured here, were paved and improved during a water pipe replacement in 2016

The difficult route is the westernmost Hero's Trail which starts either just inside the secondary gates on Runyon Canyon Road (where dogs can be let off their leashes) or immediately to the left inside the Vista gate, and takes the hiker up an 18 degree slope and then along the spine of the ridge to the second highest point in the canyon with magnificent views to the West and South. This is a considerably more taxing climb than the previous routes described and is followed by a descent via either Runyon Canyon Road or the Star Trail, and will take between 45 and 60 minutes. Taking in Indian Rock will add another 10–20 minutes.

Entering from Mulholland Drive, there are a couple of short hikes up Indian Rock to the highest point in the canyon with 360-degree views including the Valley to the North. The alternative route follows the fire road round the rock and splits off towards the Western High Way or goes towards Clouds Rest and a choice of circuits.

There is another route through the bottom of the canyon which starts by the sharp bend in the lower fire road before you reach the tennis court. From here the walker can follow the path past the ruins and over the foundation slab (which is often used as a "ground canvas" for mosaic stone patterns or worded messages spelled out in arranged rocks) and then along what would once have been the river bed, and eventually emerge at the bend at the back of the canyon on Runyon Canyon Road before the final rise up to Clouds Rest. The last bit of this route is a bit of a scramble, with cactus, overgrown bushes, insects, and possible snake encounters, but most of the rest of it is less strenuous than the climb between Inspiration Point and Clouds Rest.

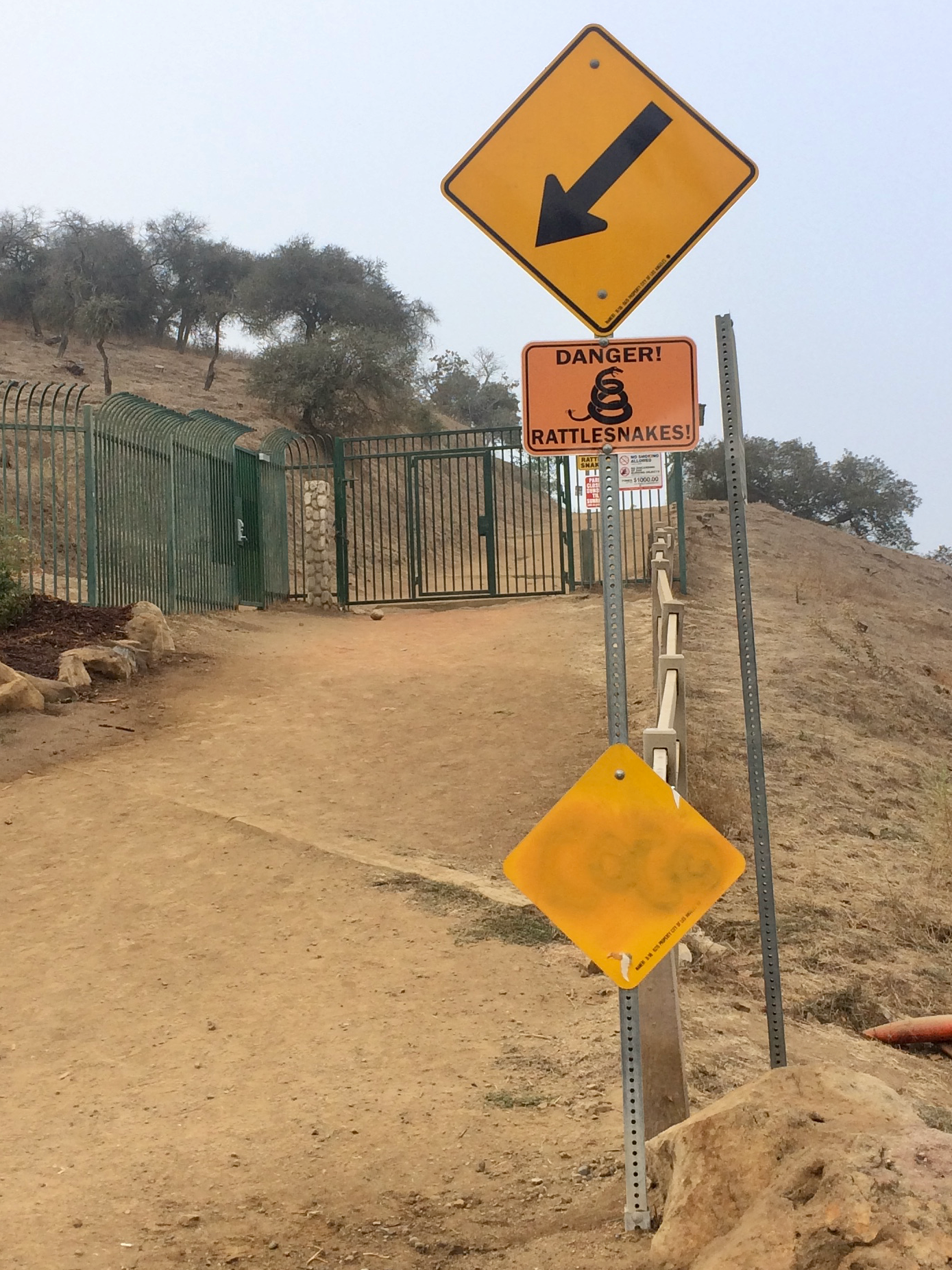
Danger! Rattlesnakes!

Directly opposite where this Lower Canyon Trail joins Runyon Canyon Road, there is another steep hike over the Middle Rock which comes out by the electricity pylon just south of Indian Rock, and to the right is another river bed walk, which brings the walker out just north of the Lloyd Wright house.

The upper canyon trail is home to a variety of wildlife including birds, owls and hawks; snakes and lizards; and deer and coyote. There are several hundred plant species throughout Runyon Canyon including black sage, elderberry, California sagebrush, wild buckwheat, golden yarrow, laurel sumac, scrub oak, sugar bush and toyon. Coyotes are often seen in the canyon at early morning and dusk, and have been known to take small animals.

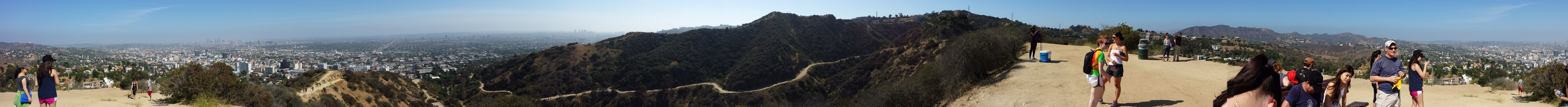
View from top

=== Rock Mandala ===
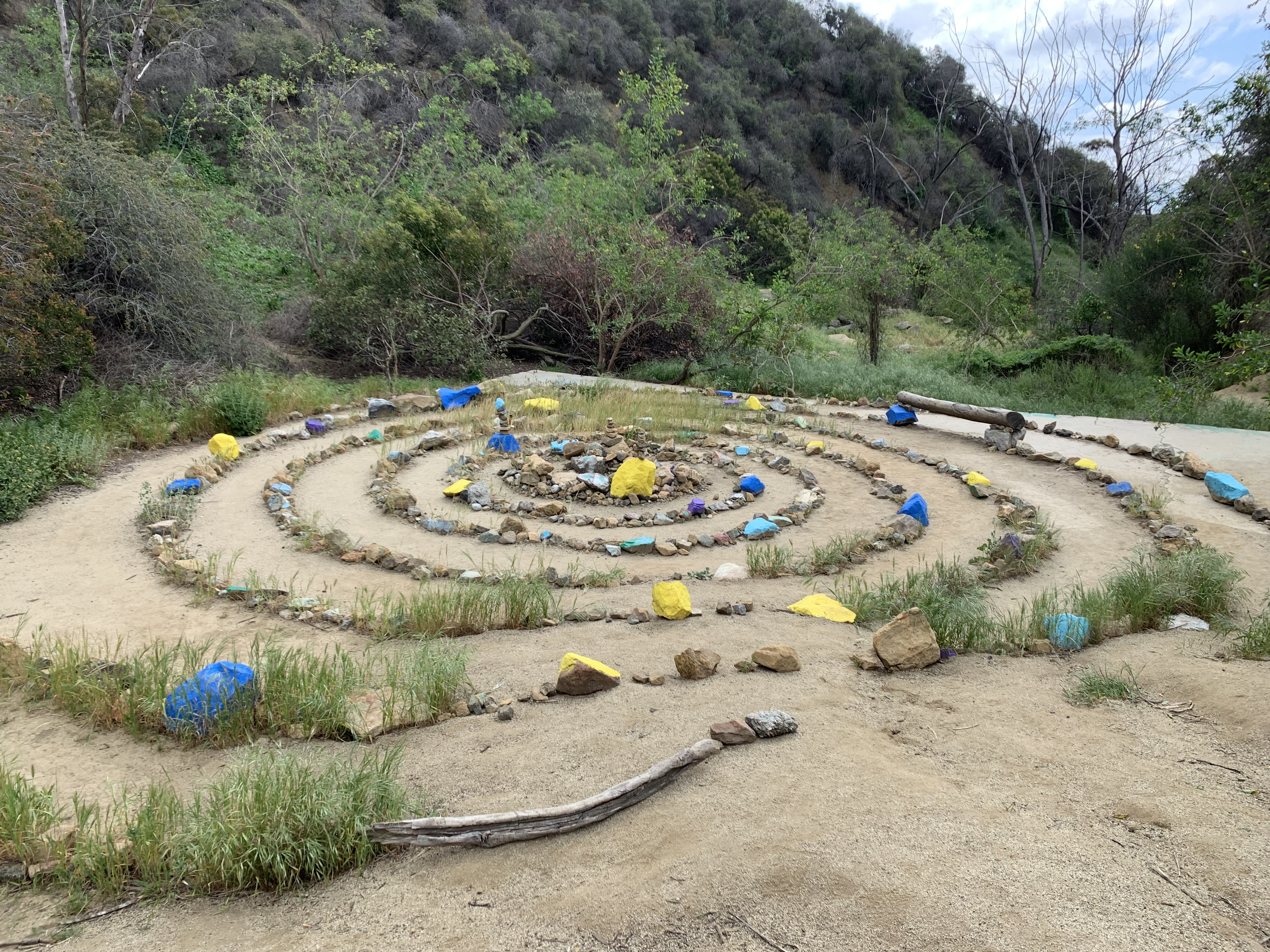
The Rock Mandala is located in a quiet valley and is regularly maintained.

The park is also home to the Rock Mandala, a piece of public artwork created in 2008 by resident and director Robert Wilson. The sculpture, a mandala of rocks, some up to 300lbs, is regularly maintained as a place to meditate and exercise. The Rock Mandala is located in a quiet valley off of the main trails in the park.

== Management and access ==
The management of the ecosystem comprising Runyon Canyon Park and its surrounding residential neighborhood has been controversial since the park's opening in 1987. Although the park's Master Plan called for a small on-site parking lot (to relieve parking pressure on residential streets) and a small "experimental" dog park, the park opened before a parking lot was constructed, and the off-leash area was broadly expanded (to its current size) in 1994, resulting in greater popularity and visibility in print and online media. Increasing complaints by homeowners about parking, traffic, and health safety problems, particularly near its Mullholland and Vista Street entrances, led to unpopular parking restrictions on adjoining residential streets. In 2003, City Councilmember Tom LaBonge formed a volunteer Park Advisory Board comprising local residents and park visitors to make recommendations for addressing these and other issues. After a series of meetings, the advisory board recommended the closure of the Vista Street gate, dog-owner use fees to help pay for park upkeep and improvements, and abandonment of Recreation and Parks Department plans for an onsite 86-space parking lot. LaBonge shortly thereafter dissolved the Board in favor of "council representatives and city employees", and its recommendations were not implemented. In 2009, LaBonge announced that plans for a parking lot were "on hold", and that the city was looking for "alternatives".

== Incidents ==
The bench overlooking Los Angeles, featured near the end of the 1992 Seinfeld episode #42, titled "The Trip, Part 2", is located in the park. In 1998, singer Rozz Williams' ashes were scattered in the park after his suicide. On March 24, 2010, actor Robert Culp died at age 79 after a fall while walking near Runyon Canyon Park. On February 18, 2022, actress Lindsey Pearlman was found in a car dead near the entrance to the park.

== See also ==
- List of parks in Los Angeles
