= White Russian (cocktail) =

Cocktail made with vodka and coffee liqueur

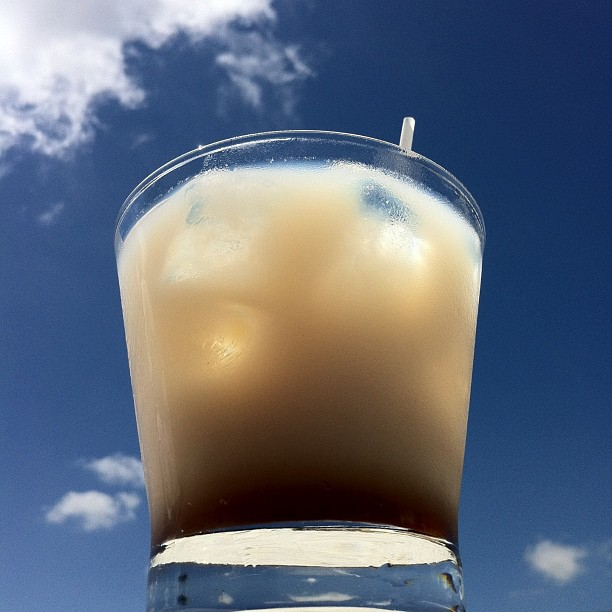
- A mixed white Russian
- Type: Cocktail
- Ingredients: 5 cl (5 parts) vodka; 2 cl (2 parts) coffee liqueur; 3 cl (3 parts) fresh cream
- Base spirit: Vodka, Coffee liqueur
- Standard drinkware: Old fashioned glass
- Served: On the rocks: poured over ice
- Preparation: Pour coffee liqueur and vodka into an old fashioned glass filled with ice. Float fresh cream on top and stir slowly.

A white Russian is a cocktail made with vodka, coffee liqueur (e.g. Kahlúa or Tia Maria) and cream served with ice in an old fashioned glass.

== History ==
The traditional cocktail known as a black Russian, which first appeared in 1949, becomes a white Russian with the addition of cream. Neither drink has any known Russian origin; both are so-named as vodka is the primary ingredient. It is unclear which drink preceded the other.

According to the Oxford English Dictionary, the first mention of white Russian in the sense of a cocktail was in the Californian newspaper Oakland Tribune on November 21, 1965, as an insert: "White Russian. 1 oz. each Southern, vodka, cream". "Southern" was Coffee Southern, a short-lived brand of coffee liqueur by Southern Comfort.

The white Russian saw a surge in popularity after the 1998 release of the film The Big Lebowski. Throughout the movie, it appears as the beverage of choice for the protagonist, Jeffrey "The Dude" Lebowski. On a number of occasions he refers to the drink as a "Caucasian".

== Preparation ==
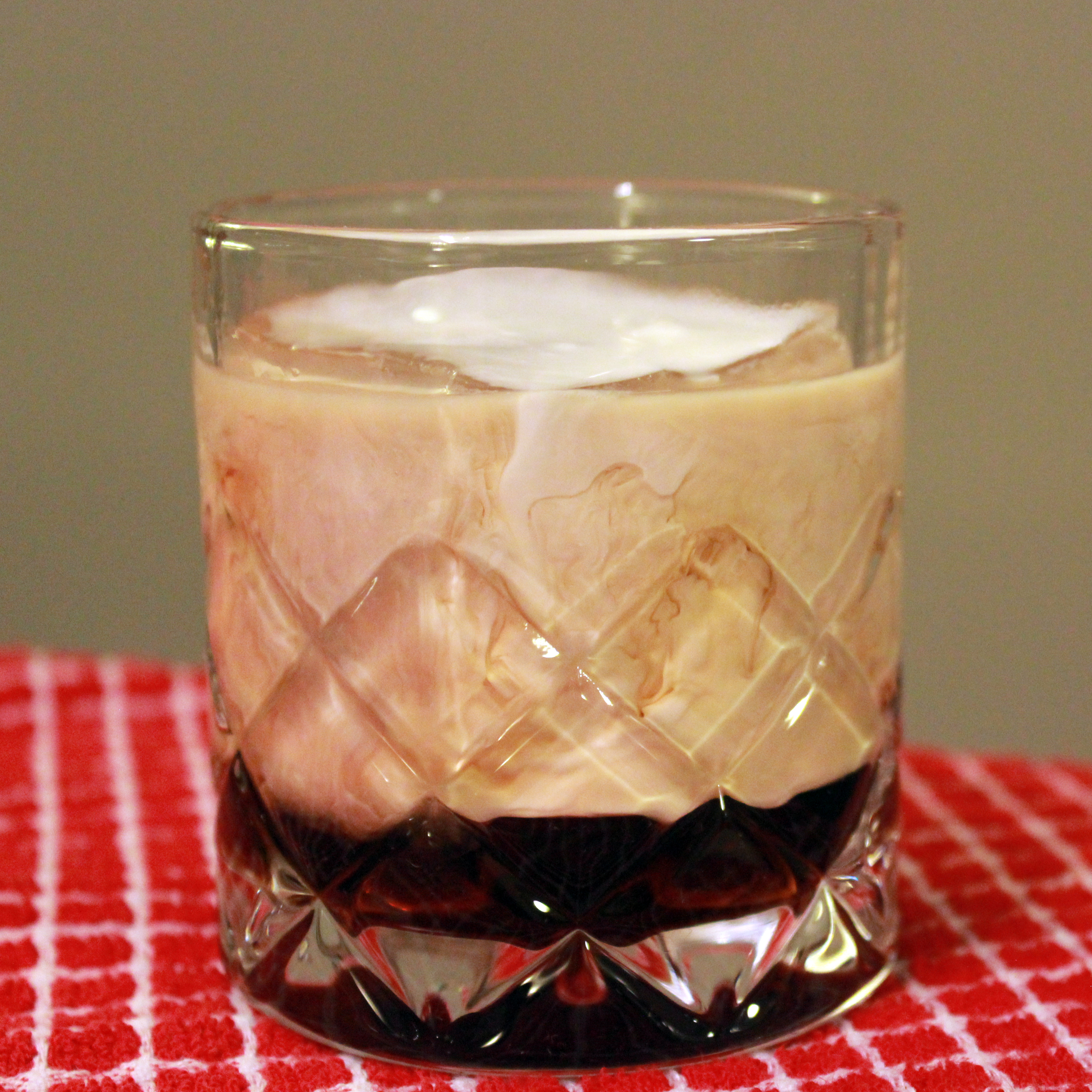
An unmixed white Russian

As with all cocktails, various modes of preparation exist, varying according to the recipes and styles of particular bars or mixologists. Most common varieties have adjusted amounts of vodka or coffee liqueur, or mixed brands of coffee liqueur. Shaking the cream in order to thicken it prior to pouring it over the drink is also common. Sometimes the drink is prepared on the stove with hot coffee for a warm treat on cold days. Conversely, vanilla ice cream has been known to be used, rather than cream, to make it frozen.

=== Variations ===
Many variants of the white Russian exist. A white Russian made with skimmed milk instead of cream is called an Anna Kournikova, after the tennis player, and a variant with no milk or cream at all is a black Russian. A version made with Irish cream is known as a mudslide, a Bolshevik, or a blonde Russian. A dirty Russian has chocolate syrup added, and a variant which adds a splash of cola is called a tall black Russian, or alternately a Paralyzer in Canada and a Colorado bulldog in the United States. A white Cuban is made with rum instead of vodka, while a white Mexican substitutes tequila for the vodka.

== See also ==
- List of cocktails
- List of coffee beverages
