= Kahlúa =

Coffee-flavoured liqueur

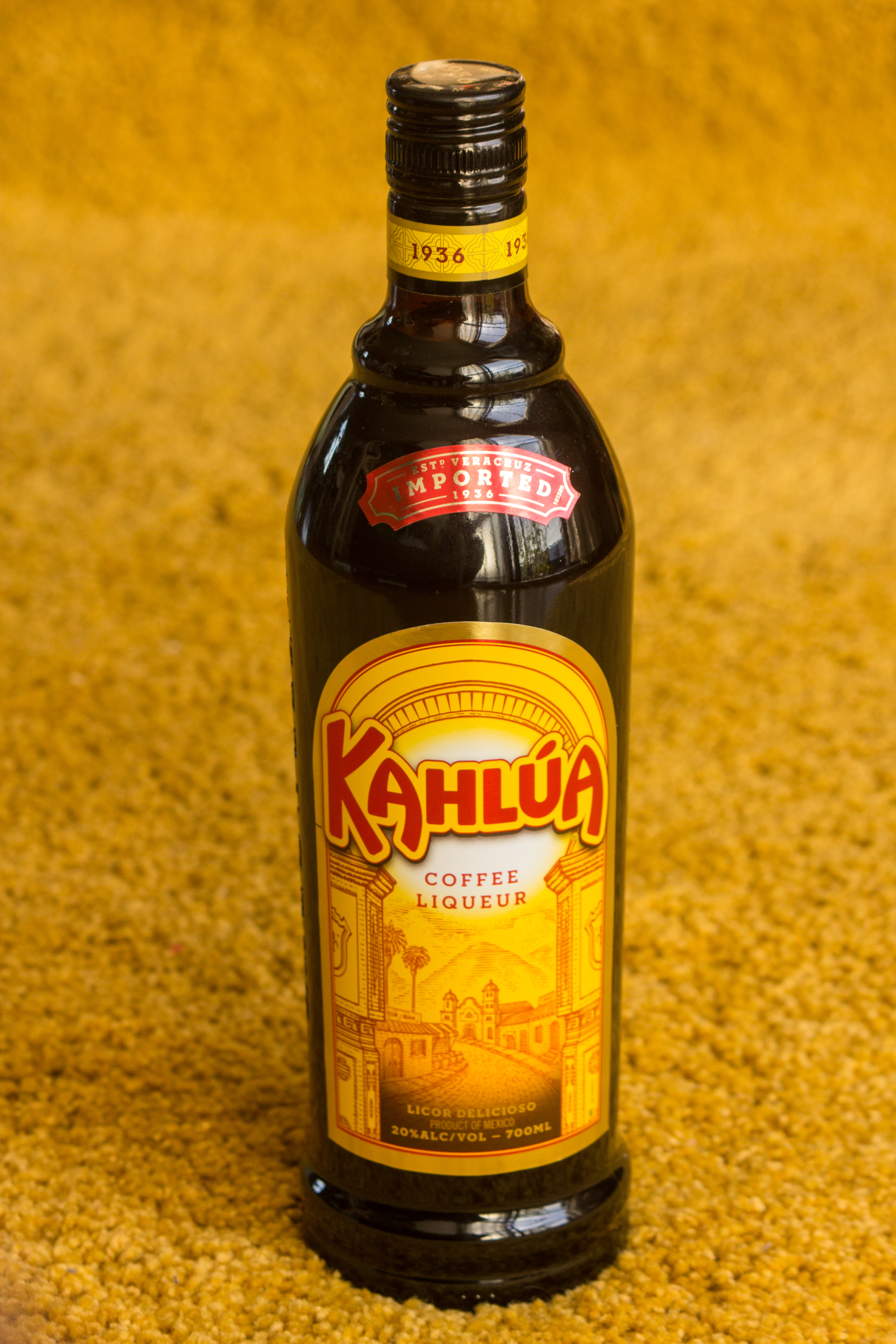
- Type: Coffee liqueur
- Manufacturer: Pernod Ricard
- Origin: Mexico
- Introduced: 1936; 90 years ago
- Alcohol by volume: 20.0%
- Website: kahlua.com

Kahlúa (Spanish: [kaˈlu.a]) is a brand of coffee liqueur owned by the Pernod Ricard company and produced in Veracruz, Mexico. The drink contains rum, sugar, and arabica coffee.

== History ==
Pedro Domecq began producing Kahlúa in 1936. It was named Kahlúa, meaning "House of the Acolhua people" in the Veracruz Nahuatl language. Jules Berman was the first importer of the liqueur to the United States, earning him the nickname "Mr. Kahlua".

The company merged in 1994 with Allied Lyons to become Allied Domecq. In turn, that company was partially acquired in 2005 by Pernod Ricard, the largest spirits distributor in the world since its merger with the Swedish Vin & Sprit in March 2008.

Since 2004, the alcohol content of Kahlúa is 20.0%; earlier versions had 26.5%. In 2002, a more expensive, high-end product called "Kahlúa Especial" became available in the United States, Canada and Australia after previously being offered only in duty-free markets. Made with arabica coffee beans grown in Veracruz, Mexico, Kahlúa Especial has an alcohol content of 36%, has a lower viscosity, and is less sweet than the regular version.

In 2021, Kahlúa introduced a new bottle design for the United Kingdom and Canada markets. It also reduced the alcohol content to 16% to "address 'evolving' consumer trends towards conscious drinking and lower-alcohol options". For the United States market, Kahlúa retains the more traditional bottle design and alcohol content.

== Uses ==
Kahlúa is used to make cocktails or drink neat or on ice. Some people use it when baking desserts, and/or as a topping for ice cream, cakes, and cheesecakes.

It is mixed in several ways, often with different combinations of milk, cream, coffee and cocoa.

Because Kahlúa is made from coffee beans, it contains caffeine. According to the company, "Kahlúa contains about 100 ppm caffeine, which means about 100 mg/litre of product. So, for a standard 1.5 oz [45 ml] drink of Kahlúa there would be about 5 mg of caffeine. Just to put it in perspective, an 8 oz [240 ml] brewed coffee can contain up to about 200 mg of caffeine."

Kahlúa is a key ingredient in several notable cocktails:

- Alfonso XIII
- Espresso Martini
- White Russian
- Black Russian
- Mind Eraser
- B-52
- Bushwacker
- Baby Guinness
- Kahlúa Sour
- Moose Milk
- Spanish coffee
- Dirty Mother
- Brown Cow

== Awards ==
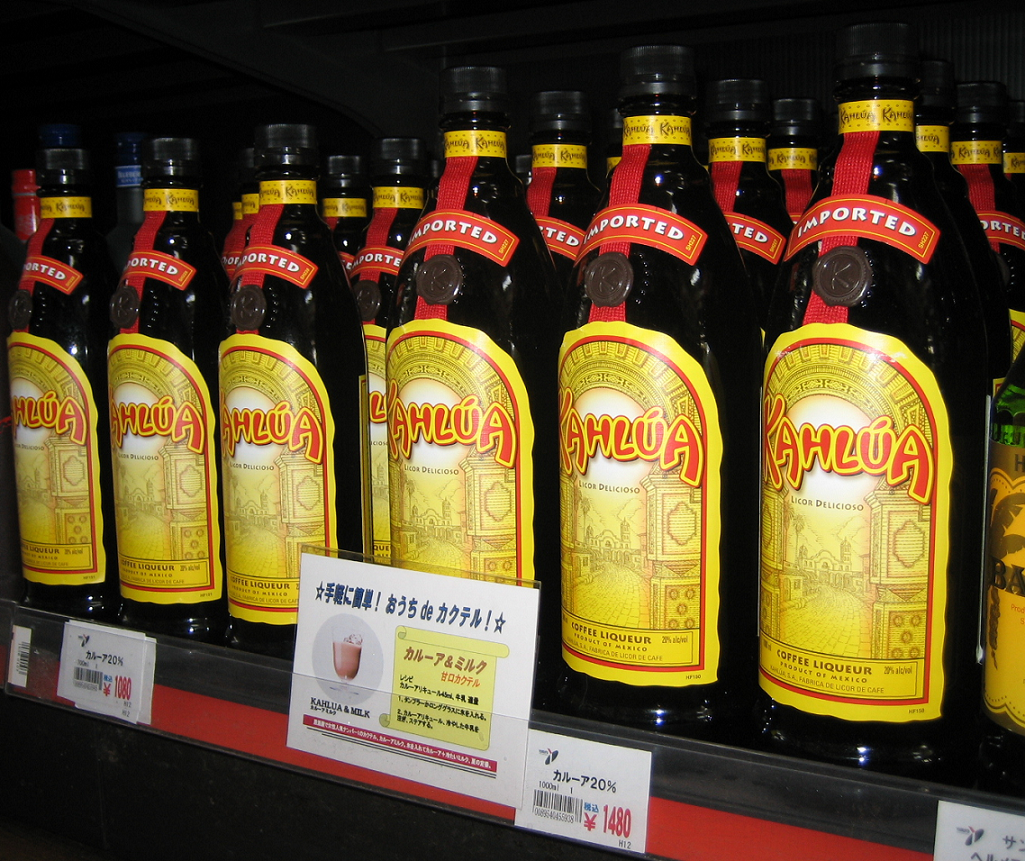
Kahlúa for sale at a liquor store in Fukushima, Japan

Kahlúa and Kahlúa Especial have received accolades from international spirit ratings organizations. The San Francisco World Spirits Competition awarded the Kahlúa Especial three silver medals between 2005 and 2007 and a bronze in 2009. The Beverage Testing Institute gave the Especial a score of 85 in 2007.

== See also ==
Media related to Kahlúa at Wikimedia Commons

- List of cocktails
- List of coffee liqueurs
- Tia Maria, a coffee liqueur
