= Double operator integral =

Type of integral

In functional analysis, double operator integrals (DOI) are integrals of the form

$$\operatorname{Q}_{\varphi}:=\int_{N}\int_M \varphi(x,y)\mathrm{d}E(x)\operatorname{T}\mathrm{d}F (y),$$

where $\operatorname{T}:G\to H$ is a bounded linear operator between two separable Hilbert spaces,

$$E:(N,\mathcal{A})\to P(H),$$
$$F:(M,\mathcal{B})\to P(G),$$

are two spectral measures, where $P(H)$ stands for the set of orthogonal projections over $H$, and $\varphi$ is a scalar-valued measurable function called the symbol of the DOI. The integrals are to be understood in the form of Stieltjes integrals.

Double operator integrals can be used to estimate the differences of two operators and have application in perturbation theory. The theory was mainly developed by Mikhail Shlyomovich Birman and Mikhail Zakharovich Solomyak in the late 1960s and 1970s, however they appeared earlier first in a paper by Daletskii and Krein.

== Double operator integrals ==
The map

$$\operatorname{J}_{\varphi}^{E,F}:\operatorname{T}\mapsto \operatorname{Q}_{\varphi}$$

is called a transformer. We simply write $\operatorname{J}_{\varphi}:=\operatorname{J}_{\varphi}^{E,F}$, when it's clear which spectral measures we are looking at.

Originally Birman and Solomyak considered a Hilbert–Schmidt operator $\operatorname{T}$ and defined a spectral measure $\mathcal{E}$ by

$$\mathcal{E}(\Lambda\times \Delta)\operatorname{T}:=E(\Lambda)\operatorname{T}F(\Delta),\quad \operatorname{T}\in \mathcal{S}_2,$$

for measurable sets $\Lambda\times \Delta\subset N \times M$, then the double operator integral $\operatorname{Q}_{\varphi}$ can be defined as

$$\operatorname{Q}_{\varphi}:=\left(\int_{N\times M} \varphi(\lambda, \mu)\;\mathrm{d}\mathcal{E}(\lambda, \mu)\right)\operatorname{T}$$

for bounded and measurable functions $\varphi$. However one can look at more general operators $\operatorname{T}$ as long as $\operatorname{Q}_{\varphi}$ stays bounded.

== Examples ==
=== Perturbation theory ===
Consider the case where $H=G$ is a Hilbert space and let $A$ and $B$ be two bounded self-adjoint operators on $H$. Let $\operatorname{T}:=B-A$ and $f$ be a function on a set $S$, such that the spectra $\sigma(A)$ and $\sigma(B)$ are in $S$. As usual, $\operatorname{I}$ is the identity operator. Then by the spectral theorem $\operatorname{J}_{\lambda}\operatorname{I}=A$ and $\operatorname{J}_{\mu}\operatorname{I}=B$ and $\operatorname{J}_{\mu-\lambda}\operatorname{I}=\operatorname{T}$, hence

$$f(B)-f(A)=\operatorname{J}_{f(\mu)-f(\lambda)}\operatorname{I}=\operatorname{J}_{\frac{f(\mu)-f(\lambda)}{\mu-\lambda}}\operatorname{J}_{\mu-\lambda}\operatorname{I}=\operatorname{J}_{\frac{f(\mu)-f(\lambda)}{\mu-\lambda}}\operatorname{T}=\operatorname{Q}_{\varphi}$$

and so

$$f(B)-f(A)=\int_{\sigma(A)}\int_{\sigma(B)}\frac{f(\mu)-f(\lambda)}{\mu-\lambda}(\mu-\lambda)\mathrm{d}E_A(\lambda)\mathrm{d}F_B(\mu)=\int_{\sigma(A)}\int_{\sigma(B)}\frac{f(\mu)-f(\lambda)}{\mu-\lambda}\mathrm{d}E_A(\lambda)\operatorname{T}\mathrm{d}F_B(\mu),$$

where $E_A(\cdot)$ and $F_B(\cdot)$ denote the corresponding spectral measures of $A$ and $B$.

== Literature ==
- Birman, Mikhail Shlemovich; Solomyak, Mikhail Zakharovich (1967). "Double Stieltjes operator integrals". Topics of Math. Physics. 1. Consultants Bureau Plenum Publishing Corporation: 25–54.
- Birman, Mikhail Shlemovich; Solomyak, Mikhail Zakharovich (1968). "Double Stieltjes operator integrals. II". Topics of Math. Physics. 2. Consultants Bureau Plenum Publishing Corporation: 19–46.
- Peller, Vladimir V. (2016). "Multiple operator integrals in perturbation theory". Bull. Math. Sci. 6: 15–88. arXiv:1509.02803. doi:10.1007/s13373-015-0073-y. S2CID 119321589.
- Birman, Mikhail Shlemovich; Solomyak, Mikhail Zakharovich (2002). Lectures on Double Operator Integrals.
- Carey, Alan; Levitina, Galina (2022). "Double Operator Integrals". Index Theory Beyond the Fredholm Case. Lecture Notes in Mathematics. Lecture Notes in Mathematics. Vol. 232. Cham: Springer. pp. 15–40. doi:10.1007/978-3-031-19436-8_2. ISBN 978-3-031-19435-1.
