= Birman (disambiguation) =

Birman is a domestic cat breed.

Birman may also refer to

- Birman (surname)
- Birman, a 544-ton bargue chartered by the New Zealand Company
- Burman University in Alberta, Canada

== See also ==
- For the dominant ethnic group of Burma, see Bamar
