= Bushwacker (cocktail) =

Cocktail

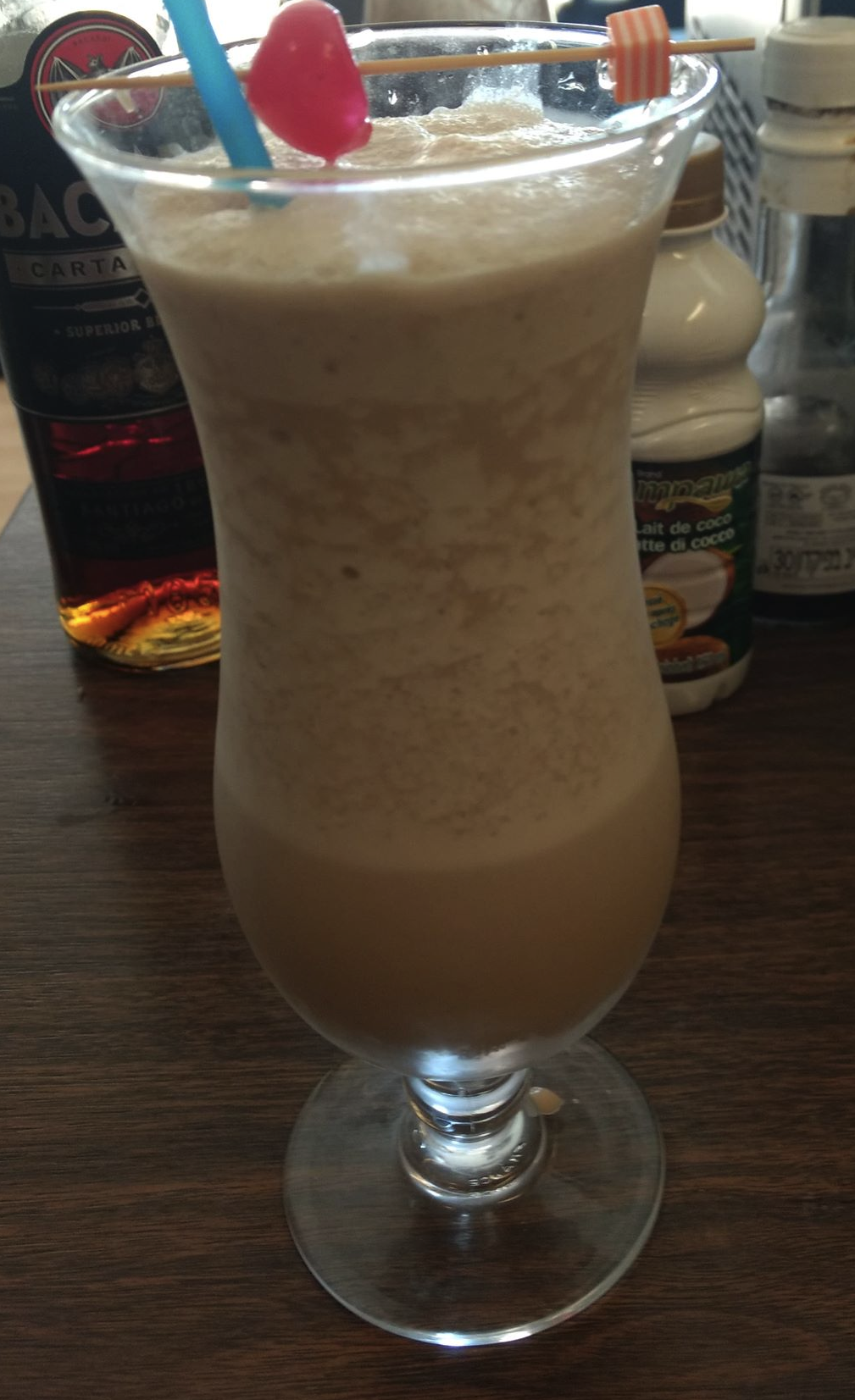
- Homemade Bushwacker
- Type: Cocktail
- Ingredients: 1 ounce Dark Rum; 1 ounce Kahlúa; 1 ounce Dark Crème de Cacao; 2 ounces Cream of Coconut; 2 ounces Milk or Half and half; 1 cup (~240 mL) ice
- Standard drinkware: Hurricane glass
- Standard garnish: Maraschino Cherry
- Served: straight up
- Preparation: Blend all the ingredients together in a blender, including the ice, and then strain into a hurricane glass. Place cherry on top of the drink as a garnish and serve. Whipped cream can also be added as a garnish to the top of the drink before the cherry.

The Bushwacker is a cocktail invented in 1975 at the Ship's Store, Sapphire Pub at Sapphire Village in St. Thomas, US Virgin Islands. It is similar to a creamy, chocolate piña colada. The original recipe called for vodka, Kahlua, dark crème de cacao, Coco Lopez (cream of coconut), a splash of triple sec, and milk, all spun in a blender with ice, and topped with a grating of fresh nutmeg - however exact recipes vary from location to location. The quantity of vodka or rum, which lends the drink most of its alcohol, can be varied, making the drink anywhere between 40% and 75% spirit, or it can be completely left out entirely. Fruit is sometimes added as a seasonal variation.

== History ==
The Bushwacker was invented at the Ship's Store/Sapphire Pub in Sapphire Village, St Thomas, U.S. Virgin Islands in the spring of 1975. A modified version of the recipe was introduced to Pensacola in 1977.

Since 1986, there has been an annual Bushwacker Festival held at Quietwater Beach in Pensacola Beach, Florida to celebrate the drink and its celebrity status.

Bushwacker Spirits of Sarasota, Florida, began bottling and mass production of Bushwacker in March 2020, and won a double gold medal at the 2024 San Francisco World Spirits Competition in the Ready-to-Drink category..

== See also ==
- List of cocktails
