= Michael Hendricks =

American psychologist

- Born: Michael Lawrence Hendricks; Michigan, U.S.
- Education: Michigan State University BA; American University MA PhD
- Scientific career
- Fields: Clinical psychology; Suicidology; LGBTQ psychology
- Workplaces: Washington Psychological Center, P.C.; Argosy University; Howard University; Catholic University of America
- Thesis: The occurrence of suicidal ideation over the course of HIV infection in gay men: A cross-sectional study (1993)
- Doctoral advisor: Alan Berman

Michael Lawrence Hendricks is an American psychologist, suicidologist, and an advocate for the LGBTQ community. He worked in private practice as a partner at the Washington Psychological Center, P.C., starting in 1999; and, since 2024, is currently in solo practice in northwest Washington, D.C. Hendricks was previously an adjunct professor of clinical psychopharmacology and has taught at Argosy University, Howard University, and Catholic University of America. He is currently a Clinical Professor at George Washington Univsersity and is a Fellow of the American Psychological Association (APA).

== Early life and education ==
Hendricks was raised in a small conservative town in Western Michigan. Hendricks attended Michigan State University as a student in social psychology. He later found that while the majority of social scientists worked in academia, he preferred clinical work under the Boulder model. He completed a master's thesis focused on HIV. Hendricks earned a doctorate in clinical psychology from The American University. His dissertation, published in 1993, is titled "The occurrence of suicidal ideation over the course of HIV infection in gay men: A cross-sectional study". His doctoral advisor was Alan Berman.

== Career ==
At the beginning of his career in the early 1990s, the HIV/AIDS crisis influenced Hendricks to address LGBTQ issues. He is a clinician and researcher and has investigated depression, suicide, substance abuse, compulsive behaviors, HIV, and gender diversity issues at the National Cancer Institute, Georgetown University Medical Center, and Virginia Commonwealth University. From 1999 to 2024, he has worked as a partner at the Washington Psychological Center, P.C. He has since gone into solo private practice. He has worked in various facilities including Spring Grove Hospital Center and Whitman-Walker Health. He was a Chief Psychologist at Umoja Methadone treatment Center and was Chief of Outpatient Mental Health Services at the Washington, D.C., Jail He is board certified in clinical psychology by the American Board of Professional Psychology.

Hendricks is a Fellow of the American Psychological Association (APA), the Society for the Psychology of Sexual Orientation and Gender Diversity, the Society of Clinical Psychology, Psychologists in Independent Practice, and the Society for the Psychological Study of Social Issues. He is also a member of the American Psychology-Law Society. He was the chair of the Research Committee of the Virginia HIV Community Planning Committee for 11 years. Hendricks has served as an APA Council representative and past president of Division 44, which is the APA's Society for the Psychology of Sexual Orientation and Gender Diversity. He has held positions as adjunct professor in at Argosy University, Howard University, and Catholic University of America., where he has taught graduate-level Clinical Psychopharmacology. He is currently a Clinical Professor at George Washington University. He is the lead author, with co-author Rylan Testa on the seminal paper that applied Ilan Meyer's minority stress model to transgender people, published in 2012. He was awarded an APA Presidential Citation.

Hendricks is a member of and is a certified healthcare provider of the World Professional Association for Transgender Health.

== Personal life ==
Hendricks had a "stealth" lifestyle as a gay man while living in a small town in Michigan. He is currently "very out".

== Selected works ==
- Hendricks, Michael L.; Testa, Rylan J. (2012). "A conceptual framework for clinical work with transgender and gender nonconforming clients: An adaptation of the Minority Stress Model". Professional Psychology: Research and Practice. 43 (5): 460–467. doi:10.1037/a0029597.
- Testa, Rylan J.; Sciacca, Laura M.; Wang, Florence; Hendricks, Michael L.; Goldblum, Peter; Bradford, Judith; Bongar, Bruce (2012). "Effects of violence on transgender people". Professional Psychology: Research and Practice. 43 (5): 452–459. doi:10.1037/a0029604.
- Goldblum, Peter; Testa, Rylan J.; Pflum, Samantha; Hendricks, Michael L.; Bradford, Judith; Bongar, Bruce (2012). "The relationship between gender-based victimization and suicide attempts in transgender people". Professional Psychology: Research and Practice. 43 (5): 468–475. doi:10.1037/a0029605.

== See also ==
- LGBT people in science
