= Brian Berman =

American acupuncture researcher

- Education: Royal College of Surgeons in Ireland; University of California, Los Angeles
- Occupation: Professor at the University of Maryland School of Medicine

Brian M. Berman is a tenured professor of family medicine at the University of Maryland School of Medicine.

== Education ==
Berman received his medical degree from the Royal College of Surgeons in Ireland. He completed his residencies at the University of Maryland School of Medicine and at the University of California, Los Angeles.

== Career ==
Berman was appointed an assistant professor at the University of Maryland School of Medicine in 1991. He was appointed an associate professor there in 1997 and a full professor in 2000, and was awarded tenure in 2003. He also founded the University of Maryland's Center for Integrative Medicine in 1991, where he is professor emeritus now. He founded the Institute for Integrative Health in 2007, now known as Nova Institute for Health.

== Research ==
Berman is known for his research into acupuncture. In 2010, Berman published a paper in the New England Journal of Medicine which recommended the use of acupuncture for lower back pain. The article was criticized by Steven Salzberg in Forbes.

== Awards and honors ==
Berman was named a "top doctor" in a 2013 survey of peers published in Baltimore, and the Center for Integrative Medicine was named a Research Center for Excellence by the National Institutes of Health under Berman's direction.
