= Bierman =

Bierman or Biermann is a surname. The genealogy of the Dutch family Bierman is published in the Nederland's Patriciaat (in Dutch)

Notable people with surname Bierman or Biermann:

- Adolph Biermann (1842–1914), American politician
- Bernie Bierman (1894–1977), American college football coach
- Bernie Bierman (1908–2012), American Tin Pan Alley composer
- Charlie Bierman (1845–1879), American baseball player
- Fred Biermann (1884–1968), U.S. Representative from Iowa
- Hugo Biermann (1916–2012), South African military commander
- Kenny Biermann, American politician
- Kroy Biermann (born 1985), American football player for the Atlanta Falcons
- Ludwig Biermann (1907–1986), German astronomer
- Nick Bierman (1910–1977), South African military commander
- Pieke Biermann (born 1950), German crime writer, literary translator and journalist
- Robert Bierman, British film and television director
- Ronnie Bierman (1938–1984), Dutch film and television actress
- Wolf Biermann (born 1936), German singer and songwriter
- John Bierman (born 1986), Canadian military officer and lawyer

== See also ==
- Biermans, a defunct Belgian printing company
- Birman (disambiguation), a similar surname
