= Jules Berman =

American businessman (c.1911–1998)

- Born: c. 1911
- Died: July 18, 1998 (aged 87); Los Angeles, California, US
- Occupation: Entrepreneur
- Known for: Importing Kahlua liquor
- Spouse: Ruth Joyce Herskovits (m. 1945–1998)

Jules Berman (c. 1911 – July 18, 1998) was a liquor importer, southern California real estate developer and Pre-Columbian art collector known as "Mr Kahlua".

== Business career ==
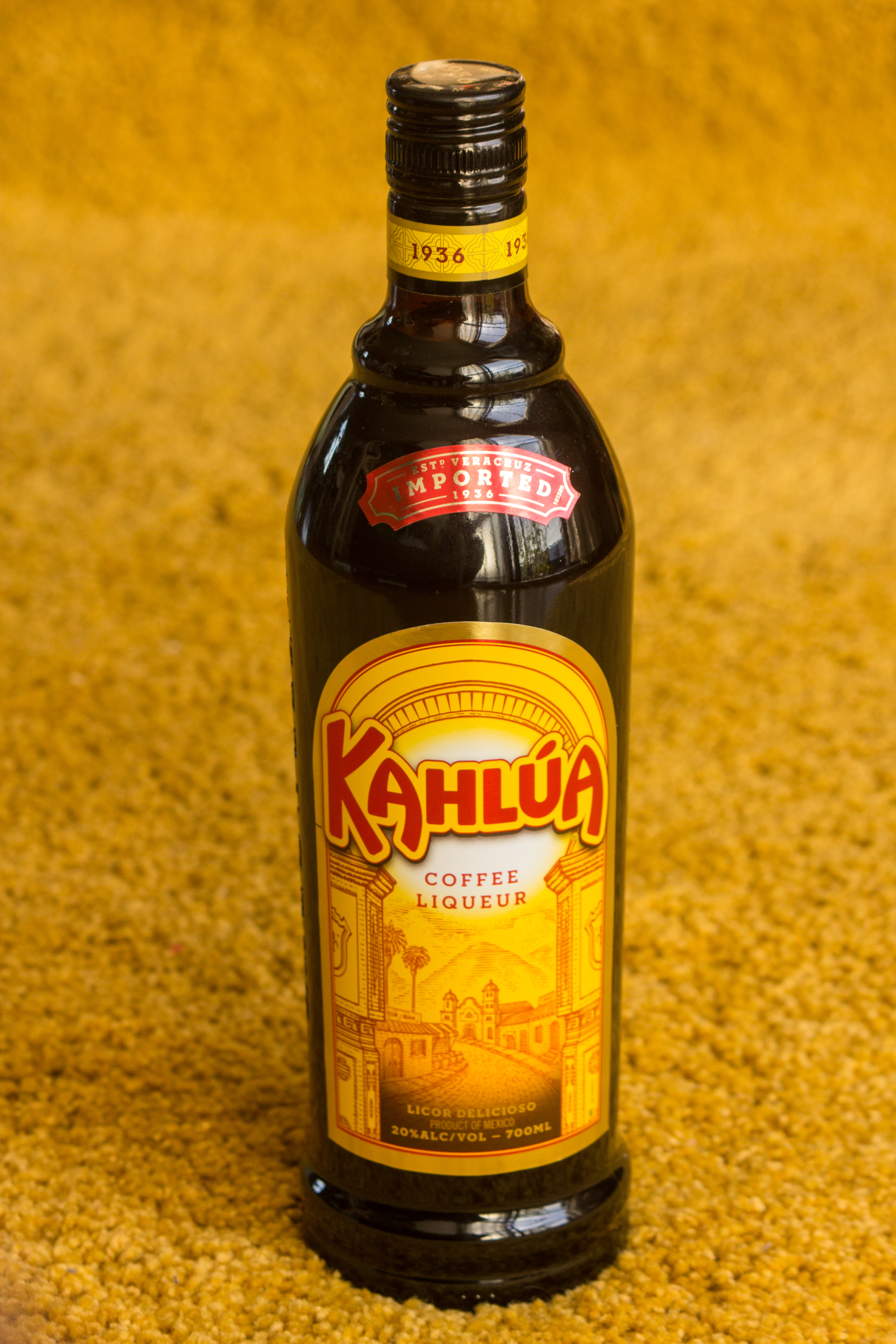
Kahlúa, a Mexican coffee flavored liqueur

In 1962, Berman became the first importer of the liquor Kahlua to the United States, earning him the nickname "Mr. Kahlua".

Berman developed a passion for Pre-Columbian art from Mexico. In the 1960s, Kahlua print advertising featured images of Mexican antiquities, creating a pop culture phenomenon. The ads featured Mesoamerican figures coupled with sandy beaches and humorous balloon captions.

Bermans collection included clay and stone figures from Pre-Columbian cultures dating 1500 B.C. to 1521 A.D. The Fine Art Gallery of San Diego published a catalog of Jules Bermans collection, "Collection of Pre-Hispanic Mexican Art" in 1973.

=== Real Estate ===
Berman transitioned into real estate, creating the Lake Arrowhead Development Company with William Newell and Joe D. Brown, where he served as president. In November 1960 the company purchased the 3,200 acres (1,300 ha) Lake Arrowhead, California, and Lake Arrowhead Village from the Los Angeles Turf Club for $6.5 million. They built an 18-hole golf course and subdivided 18 residential tracts. In 1968, in order to finance the further development of the area, Lake Arrowhead Development Company merged with the Boise Cascade Corp. for $18 million.

In 1964, Berman purchased the land which is now Runyon Canyon Park in Los Angeles from Huntington Hartford. He razed the mansion, San Patrizio, built on the land by singer John McCormack, to avoid taxes and to support the development of luxury houses. Unable to complete his development plans due to local homeowners protests, he sold the land to Iranian exile Mana Vasir in 1979.

In 1965, Lake Arrowhead Development Company purchased the 3,600 acres (1,500 ha) El Capitan Ranch on the Gaviota Coast in California for $4 million. Berman recruited Fritz Barber to bring some of the first Lipizzaner horses into the United States from Vienna, Austria, and train them at the ranch in techniques made famous by the Spanish Riding School. Berman later developed the ranch into luxury homes. In 2002, El Capitan Ranch was purchased by the Land Trust for Santa Barbara County and became part of El Capitan State Beach.

=== California State Athletic Commission ===
Berman was appointed to the California State Athletic Commission by Governor Pat Brown in the 1965. While Berman was a member, the commission famously denied Muhammad Ali a permit to box in California when he refused to be inducted into military service during the Vietnam War. Ali (Cassius Clay at the time) was refused permits to box from several states. During this time the Commission also advocated to blackout the closed circuit broadcast of Ali's fights held outside of California.

== Barry Berman Disappearance ==
In January 1985, Jules son Barry Berman, 36, and his wife, Louise, 52, disappeared while on a camping trip to Saline Hot Springs in Death Valley National Monument. Jules and Ruth Berman ran full-page advertisements in southern California newspapers and offered a $25,000 reward, but the disappearance went unsolved. On November 12, 1988, a hiker found a human skull near a campground at Saline Hot Springs. Investigators arrived later and exhumed the remains, which were identified through dental records as Barry and Louise. In 2015, evidence began to implicate convict Michael Joseph Pepe in the disappearance of Barry and Louise Berman.

== Personal life ==
Berman married Ruth Joyce Herskovits on February 22, 1945, in Beverly Hills, California.

Berman died on July 18, 1998, aged 87, of heart failure at Century City Hospital in Century City, California, and was survived by his wife Ruth.
