= Mikhail Birman =

Russian mathematician and university professor

Mikhail Shlyomovich Birman (Russian: Михаил Шлёмович Бирман; born 17 January 1928 in Leningrad; died 2 July 2009) was a Russian mathematician and university professor. His research included functional analysis, partial differential equations and mathematical physics. In particular, he did research in the fields of scattering theory, operators in Hilbert spaces and the spectral theory of differential operators.

Together with Mikhail Zakharovich Solomyak he developed the theory of double operator integrals.

== Life ==
Birman was born in 1928 in Leningrad (now St. Petersburg) to a father that was a professor and specialist in theoretical mechanics and a mother that was a school teacher. During the Second World War the family fled to Sverdlovsk (now Yekaterinburg). After the war the family went back to Leningrad. In 1950 Birman graduated from the Mathematical-Mechanical Faculty of Leningrad University with a diploma. Although Birman was one of the best students, he was denied a doctorate at Leningrad University because of his Jewish origins and the state antisemitic policy of the time. In 1947 he married Tatyana Petrovna Ilyina. Eventually in 1954 he did his doctorate at the Leningrad Mining University.

In 1956 he joined the Department of Mathematical Physics at the Physics Faculty of Leningrad University. In 1962 he received a Sc.D. (Doctor of Science) for his work The Spectrum of Singular Boundary Value Problems. In 1974 he was an invited speaker at the International Congress of Mathematicians in Vancouver, but was prohibited to leave the Soviet Union.

Birman was the supervisor for more than 20 students, including Boris Pavlov and Timo Weidl. He was also editor of the Russian mathematics journals "Algebra i Analiz" and "Funktsional'Nyi Analiz i Ego Prilozheniya". He remained in the Department of Mathematical Physics at Saint Petersburg University until his death in 2009.

== See also ==
- Birman–Schwinger principle
- Double operator integral

== Scientific work ==
Birman wrote three monographs, six books and over 160 scholarly papers.

=== Books (selection) ===
- Birman, M. Sh.; Vilenkin, N. Ya.; Gorin, E. A. (1972). Functional analysis (in Russian). Nauka.
- Birman, M. Sh.; Solomyak, M. Z. (1980). Spectral theory of selfadjoint operators in Hilbert space (in Russian). Leningrad. Univ.
- Birman, M. Sh.; Solomyak, M. Z. Quantitative Analysis in Sobolev Imbedding Theorems and Applications to Spectral Theory. Amer. Math. Soc. Transl. Ser. 2. Vol. 114. American Mathematical Society.

== Literature ==
- Buslaev, V. S.; Vershik, A. M. (2000). "Mikhail Shlyomovich Birman (on his 70th birthday)". Russian Mathematical Surveys. 55 (1): 201. doi:10.1070/RM2000v055n01ABEH000266. S2CID 250826373.
- Solomyak, M. Z.; Suslina, T. A.; Yafaew, D. R. (2012). "On the mathematical work of M. Sh. Birman" (PDF). St. Petersburg Mathematical Journal. 23 (1): 1–38. doi:10.1090/S1061-0022-2011-01184-7. S2CID 119595913.
