= Karen Berman =

American psychiatrist and physician-scientist

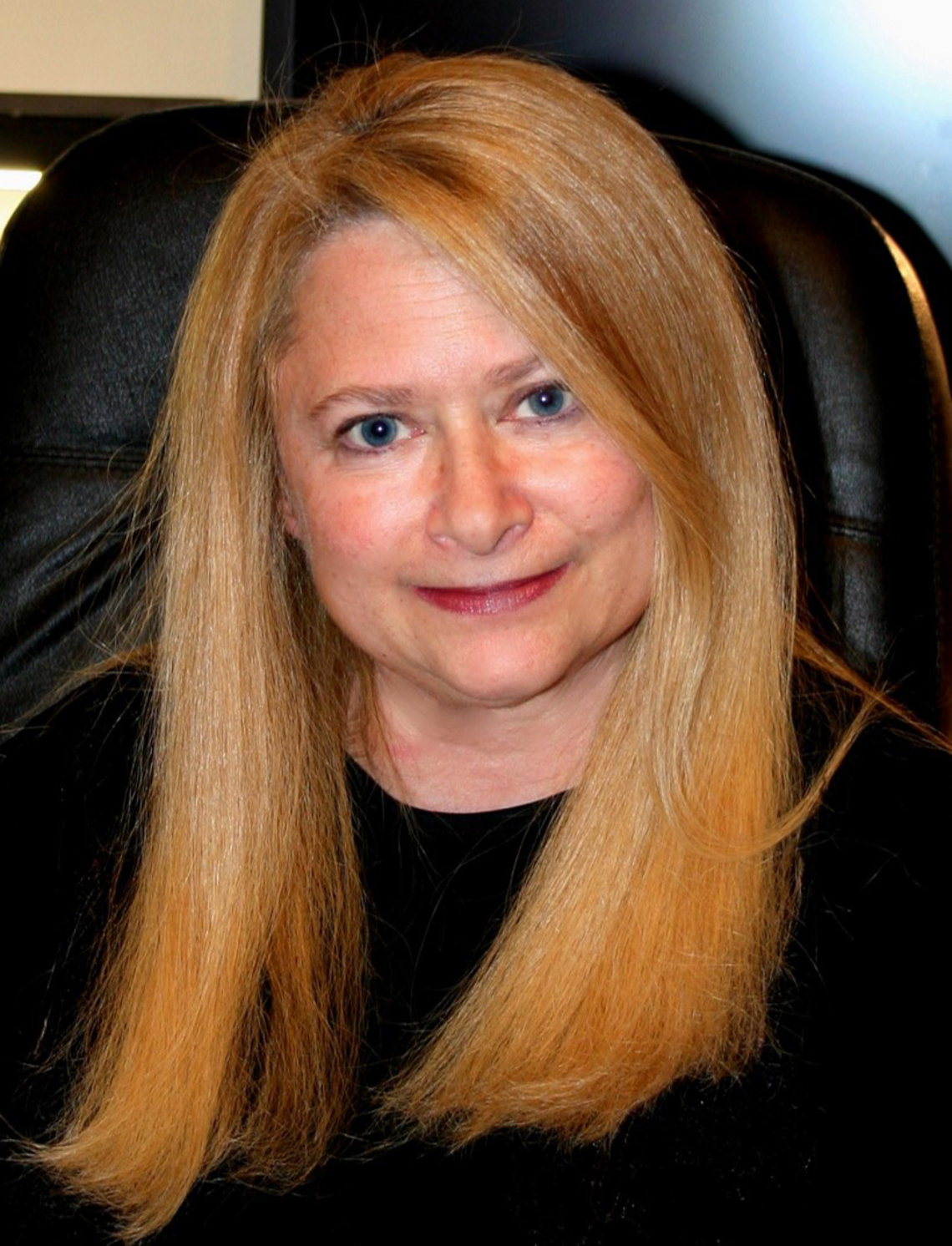
- Born: Karen Faith Berman
- Education: University of Rochester; Saint Louis University
- Scientific career
- Fields: Integrative neuroimaging, psychosis, cognitive studies
- Workplaces: National Institute of Mental Health

Karen Faith Berman is an American psychiatrist and physician-scientist who is a senior investigator and chief of the section on integrative neuroimaging, the psychosis and cognitive studies section, and the clinical and translational neuroscience branch of the National Institute of Mental Health's division of intramural research.

== Life ==
Berman received a B.S. degree from the University of Rochester and a M.D. from Saint Louis University School of Medicine. She completed her medical internship at Washington University in St. Louis and had residency training in psychiatry at the University of California, San Diego. Berman also completed residency training in nuclear medicine at the National Institutes of Health Clinical Center and is board certified in both psychiatry and nuclear medicine.

She is a senior investigator and chief of the section on integrative neuroimaging, the psychosis and cognitive studies section, and the clinical and translational neuroscience branch of the National Institute of Mental Health's (NIMH) division of intramural research. Berman's group uses functional neuroimaging to map brain activity and neurochemical mechanisms associated with normal higher cognitive function as well as dysfunction in neuropsychiatric illnesses such as schizophrenia, illnesses having genetic sources of cognitive dysfunction such as Williams syndrome, and other conditions impacting cognition such as normal aging. They also study the effects of gonadal steroid hormones on brain function. In 2016, Berman was elected to the National Academy of Medicine. In 2023, she became a Fellow of the American Association for the Advancement of Science.
