= Black Russian =

Cocktail of vodka and coffee liqueur

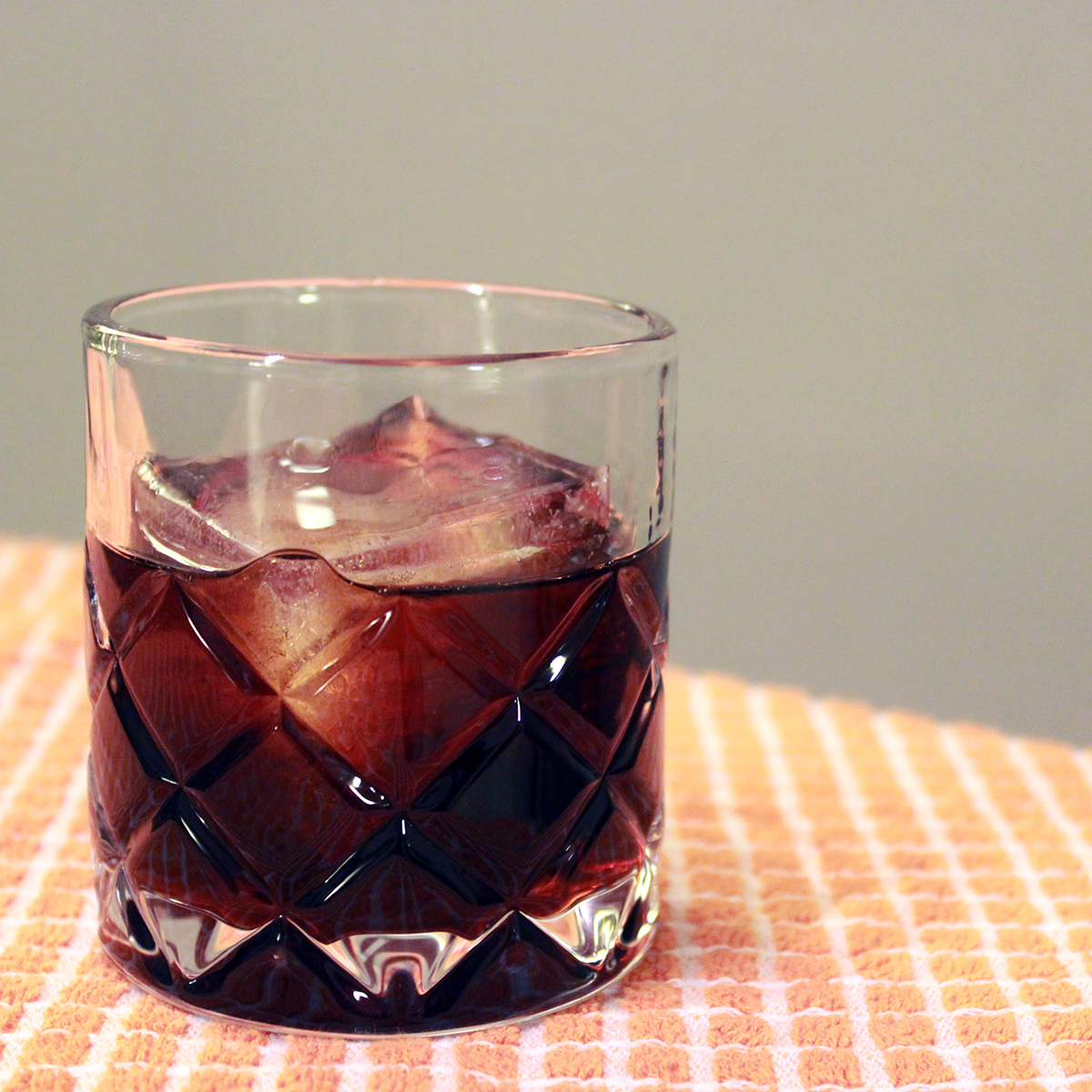
- A black Russian cocktail
- Type: Cocktail
- Ingredients: 50 ml Vodka; 20 ml Coffee liqueur
- Standard drinkware: Old fashioned glass
- Served: On the rocks: poured over ice
- Preparation: Pour the ingredients into the old fashioned glass filled with ice cubes. Stir gently.

The Black Russian is a cocktail of vodka and coffee liqueur. It contains 50 ml vodka and 20 ml coffee liqueur, per IBA specified ingredients.

The drink is made by pouring the vodka and coffee liqueur over ice cubes or cracked ice in an old-fashioned glass and stirring. The Black Russian is often garnished with a lemon slice and a Luxardo maraschino cherry on a stick.

== History ==
The Black Russian cocktail first appeared in 1949 and is ascribed to Gustave Tops, a Belgian barman, who created it at the Hotel Metropole in Brussels in honor of Perle Mesta, then United States Ambassador to Luxembourg. The cocktail owes its name to the use of vodka, a typical Russian spirit, and the blackness of the coffee liqueur.

== Variations ==
- Dirty Black Russian, Tall Black Russian, Australian Black Russian or Colorado Bulldog: served in a highball glass and topped up with cola.
- Black Magic: served with a dash of lemon juice and a lemon twist to garnish.
- Irish Russian or Smooth Black Russian: served with a head of Guinness.
- Brown Russian: served in a highball glass and topped with ginger ale.
- Belarusian or white Russian: served with milk or cream.
- Mudslide: served with Irish cream, either fresh cream or ice cream, with or without chocolate sauce rim.
- Mind Eraser: topped up with sparkling water.
- Paralyzer: Made with cola and milk in addition to vodka and coffee liqueur.

== Cultural impact ==
- The cocktail is mentioned by the Italian judicial and criminal witness Alberto Biggiogero during testimony in the trial concerning the death of Giuseppe Uva, a case covered by the television program Un giorno in pretura.
- In the film The Naked Gun 2½: The Smell of Fear, the protagonist Frank Drebin (played by Leslie Nielsen) orders the famous drink in one scene.

== See also ==
- List of cocktails
