= Bearman =

Bearman is a surname. Notable people with the surname include:

- Greg Bearman (born 1975), Canadian Football League player
- Joe Bearman (born 1982), English rugby union player
- Joshuah Bearman, American writer
- Oliver Bearman (born 2005), British motor racing driver
- Peri J. Bearman (born 1953), scholar of Islamic law
- Peter Bearman (born 1956), American sociologist
- Rico Bearman (born 2003), BMX racer from New Zealand
