= Coert Beerman =

Dutch businessman

Coert Beerman (born 1955 in Vlaardingen) is a Dutch business man and currently member of the board of Feyenoord Rotterdam as well as the chairman of the Rabobank of the Rotterdam district. He also is the director of the Efteling and a member of the Economic Development Board Rotterdam. Before joining the Rabobank in the Rotterdam district he was the chairman of the Rabobank in the Eindhoven district. As a member of the board of directors at Feyenoord he is responsible for the financial portfolio.
