= Joel Birman =

Brazilian psychiatrist and psychotherapist

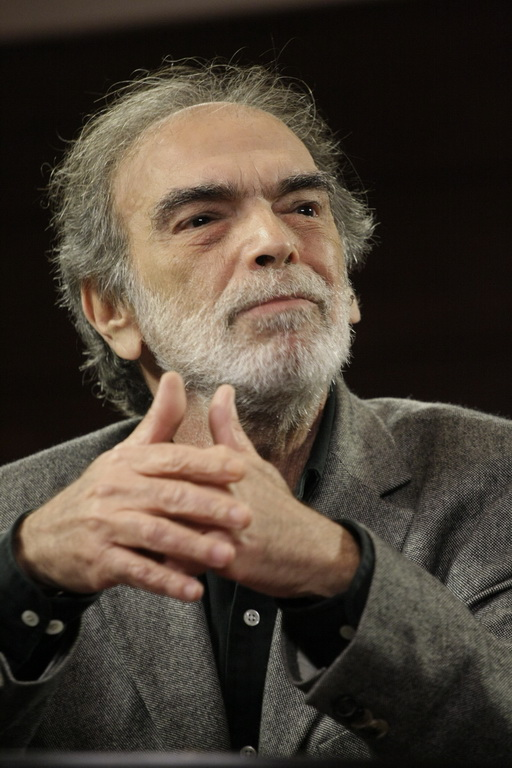
Portrait of Joel Birman

Joel Birman is a Brazilian psychiatrist and psychotherapist. He was born in Vitória, State of Espírito Santo of Romanian Jewish immigrant parents. He graduated in Medicine in the 1970s and pursued his post graduate studies in São Paulo and Paris. Birman is one of the most prolific Brazilian authors in the field of psychoanalysis and has written several books in Brazil and France. He is currently professor of Psychology in the Federal University of Rio de Janeiro (UFRJ) and of Social Medicine in the University of the State of Rio de Janeiro (UERJ).

He's also starting, at Collège International de Philosophie, Paris, a line of research interdisciplinary with Psychotherapy and Philosophy about the "New conditions of the mal estar in the civilization".
