= Nathaniel Berman =

American academic

Nathaniel Berman is the Rahel Varnhagen Professor (Emeritus) at Brown University and Visiting Professor of History and Law at Columbia University. The overarching theme in Berman's scholarship concerns the experiences of "otherness" in law, politics, and religion. For much of his career, Berman's scholarship focused on the construction of modern internationalism through its relationships to nationalism and colonialism. It identified early 20th century international law as one of the sites of the invention of cultural modernism. Berman's work on these issues has been broadly interdisciplinary, drawing on literary criticism, cultural studies, post-colonial theory, and religious studies. More recently, Berman's work has focused on the relationship between religion and legal and political discourse. For several years, he co-directed Brown's Religion and Internationalism Project, a joint venture between the Cogut Institute and Brown's Religious Studies Department.

Berman has also embarked on several major projects in Judaic Studies. His work emphasizes the mythological strands of kabbalah's formative period in 12th and 13th century France and Spain. Pursuing his interest in "otherness," Berman has explored complex kabbalistic myths of the relationships between the divine and demonic realms. This scholarship has particularly focused on the "Sefer Ha-Zohar," the "Book of Splendor." In exploring these texts, Berman has used the methods of classical and modern rhetorical theory, as well as Freudian and poststructuralist psychoanalysis.

A summa cum laude graduate of Yale College, Berman received his J.D. from Harvard Law School, and his PhD in Jewish Studies from University College London. Before teaching at Brown, Berman was a professor of law at Brooklyn Law School and Northeastern University School of Law. He began his teaching career as the Mellon Lecturer in Law and the Social Order at Amherst College. He has also held visiting appointments at institutions including Columbia Law School, Stanford University, the University of Paris-I, and Sciences Po.

== Select publications ==
- Divine and Demonic in the Poetic Mythology of the Zohar: the "Other Side" of Kabbalah. Leiden: Brill, 2018. ISBN 978-90-04-38619-8
- Passion and Ambivalence: Colonialism, Nationalism, and International Law. Leiden: Brill, 2012. ISBN 978 90 04 21024 0
- Passions et ambivalences. Le colonialisme, le nationalisme et le droit international. Paris: Pedone 2008, ISBN 9782233005342
- ‘The Devil’s Party: The Discourse of Demonisation in a Fracturing World’, in London Review of International Law 6:1 (2018)
- ‘"In a Place Parallel to God": The Draft, the Demonic, and the Conscientious Cubist’, in Journal of Law and Religion, 32:2 (2017)
- ‘Demonic Writing: Textuality, Otherness, and Zoharic Proliferation’, in Jewish Studies Quarterly, 24:4 (2017)
- '"The Sacred Conspiracy": Religion, Nationalism, and the Crisis of Internationalism', in Leiden Journal of International Law 25:9 (2012), reprinted in Silvio Ferrari & Rinaldo Cristofori (eds.), Current Issues in Law and Religion (London: Ashgate 2013)
