= Nechemia Berman =

Uruguayan rabbi

Rabbi Nechemia Berman was the Chief Rabbi of Uruguay.

Born in the city of Buenos Aires, Argentina, he served as Rabbi of Montevideo's Ashkenazi Community (Comunidad Israelita del Uruguay) from 1977 until 1993. This position has always been considered as Chief Rabbi of the entire Uruguayan Jewish community.

In 1984, Berman helped to co-found the Council of Jews and Christians of Uruguay.

Berman was buried in Jerusalem in 1993.
