= Boris Berman (journalist) =

Soviet and Russian journalist and broadcaster

- Born: Boris Isaakovich Berman; 15 August 1948 (age 76); Moscow
- Occupation(s): TV journalist, TV presenter

Boris Isaakovich Berman (Russian: Бори́с Исаа́кович Бе́рман; born August 15, 1948, Moscow) is a Soviet and Russian journalist and broadcaster.

== Biography ==
In 1971 he graduated with honors from the television department of the MSU Faculty of Journalism.

Since 1986 through 1989 commentator on cinema issues consultant movie APN.

Since 2003 to the present he has been working on the Channel One Russia.

In 2004–2014 years once a year (in the 20 days of February) conducted the program Interesting cinema in Berlin. In 2004-2013 he was the master of ceremonies of opening and closing of the Moscow International Film Festival, interviewed actors and directors on the red carpet.

Since June 2006, the present time the author and presenter of the program On the Night Watching (with Ildar Zhandarev).

Winner of the TEFI in the nomination The Best Program About Art (1995).

In 2009, Boris Berman was awarded TEFI paired with premium Ildar Zhandarev in the interviewer.
