= Alan Berman =

American psychologist (born 1943)

Alan Lee Berman (born July 10, 1943) also known as Lanny Berman, is an American psychologist, psychotherapist, and suicidologist. He is an adjunct professor of Psychiatry and Behavioral Sciences at Johns Hopkins School of Medicine. Berman was formerly the executive director of the American Association of Suicidology. He is a fellow of the American Psychological Association and the International Association for Suicide Research. Berman has a private practice in psychological and forensic consultation.

== Education ==
Berman earned a Bachelor of Arts degree from Johns Hopkins University and a Doctor of Philosophy from Catholic University of America. His 1970 dissertation was titled The Effect Of Videotape Self-Confrontation On Level Of Ego Functioning And Thought Disturbance In Non-Paranoid, Process Schizophrenics.

== Career ==
Berman worked at American University from 1969 to 1991, eventually becoming a tenured full professor. He served as the president of the American Association of Suicidology from 1984 to 1985. After 1991, he became a Distinguished Adjunct Professor at American University. The same year, he was named the director of the National Center for the Study and Prevention of Suicide at the Washington School of Psychiatry. In January 1995, Berman became the executive director of the American Association of Suicidology. He retired from that position on July 1, 2014. In 2009 and 2011, he was elected the president of the International Association for Suicide Prevention. Berman is an adjunct professor of Psychiatry and Behavioral Sciences at Johns Hopkins School of Medicine.

Berman is a Diplomate in Clinical Psychology from the American Board of Professional Psychology. He is a fellow of the American Psychological Association and the International Academy of Suicide Research. Berman was the doctoral advisor of Michael Hendricks. Berman has a private practice in psychological and forensic consultation in Chevy Chase, Maryland.

== Awards and honors ==
In 1982, Berman received the Shneidman Award for Outstanding Contributions in Research in Suicidology. In 2006, he received the Louis I. Dublin Award for service and contributions to the field of suicide prevention. In 2015, he received a Distinguished Alumni Award from the Catholic University of America's Department of Psychology.

== Selected works ==
=== Articles ===
- Berman, Alan L.; Hays, James E. (1973). "Relation between death anxiety, belief in afterlife, and locus of control". Journal of Consulting and Clinical Psychology. 41 (2): 318. doi:10.1037/h0035122. ISSN 1939-2117. PMID 4747949.
- Berman, Alan L. (March 1, 1990). "Suicide Attempts Among Adolescent Drug Users". Archives of Pediatrics & Adolescent Medicine. 144 (3): 310–4. doi:10.1001/archpedi.1990.02150270060026. ISSN 1072-4710. PMID 2305736.
- O’Carroll, Patrick W.; Berman, Alan L.; Maris, Ronald; Moscicki, Eve; Tanney, Bryan; Silverman, Morton (2002). Beyond the Tower of Babel. pp. 23–39. doi:10.1007/0-306-47150-7_7. ISBN 978-0-306-45815-6.
- Rudd, M. David; Berman, Alan L.; Joiner, Thomas E.; Nock, Matthew K.; Silverman, Morton M.; Mandrusiak, Michael; Van Orden, Kimberly; Witte, Tracy (2006). "Warning Signs for Suicide: Theory, Research, and Clinical Applications". Suicide and Life-Threatening Behavior. 36 (3): 255–262. doi:10.1521/suli.2006.36.3.255. ISSN 0363-0234. PMID 16805653. S2CID 33814905.

=== Books ===
- Berman, Alan Lee (1990). Suicide Prevention: Case Consultations. Springer. ISBN 9780826171207.
- Berman, Alan Lee; Jobes, David A. (January 1, 1991). Adolescent Suicide: Assessment and Intervention. American Psychological Association. ISBN 9781557981141.Reprinted in Italian: Il suicidio nell’ adolescenza: Valutazione e intervento (1999). Roma: Edizioni Scientifiche Magi.
- Bongar, Bruce; Berman, Alan L.; Maris, Ronald W.; Silverman, Morton M.; Packman, Wendy; Harris, Eric A. (July 16, 1999). Risk Management with Suicidal Patients. Guilford Press. ISBN 9781572304987.
- Berman, Alan Lee; Silverman, Morton M.; Maris, Ronald (August 10, 2000). Comprehensive Textbook of Suicidology. Guilford Press. ISBN 9781572305410.
- Maris, Ronald W., Berman, Alan L., Maltsberger, John T., & Yufit, Robert. (Eds.) (1992). Assessment and Prediction of Suicide. New York: Guilford. Chosen as Book-of-the-Month by the Behavioral Science Book Service.).
- Leenaars, Antoon A., Berman, Alan L., Cantor, Pamela, & Maris, Ronald W. (Eds.). (1993). Suicidology: Essays in Honor of Edwin S. Shneidman. Nothvale, New Jersey: Jason Aronson.
- Berman, Alan L., Jobes, David A., & Silverman, Morton M. (2006). Youth Suicide: Assessment and Intervention (2nd Ed.), Washington, D.C.: American Psychological Association.
- Berman, Alan L. & Pompili, Maurizio. (Eds.). (2011). Suicide Risk Associated with Medical Conditions. Washington, DC: American Association of Suicidology.
