= Jekuthiel Berman =

Russian Hebrew writer

- Born: 1825
- Died: c. 1889; Moscow, Russian Empire
- Writing career
- Language: Hebrew
- Literary movement: Haskalah

Jekuthiel Berman (Hebrew: יקותיאל בערמאן; 1825 – c. 1889) was a Russian Hebrew writer, who published a number of novellas in maskilic journals.

== Biography ==
For over thirty years, Berman held a position in the employ of the railroad magnate Samuel Polyakov, and devoted part of his leisure to literary composition. Between 1870 and 1880 he lived in Tver and later in Moscow. A stroke of paralysis in 1887 rendered him incapable of continuing either his vocation or his literary efforts.

Berman's first novel, Shenot ra'inu ra'ah ('The Years Wherein We Have Seen Evil'), which describes the life and sufferings of the Cantonists in the time of Emperor Nicholas I, appeared in the first volume of Ha-Melitz (1860). Another novel, Pesel Mikah ('The Graven Image of Micah'), appeared in the same periodical (1884). Ha-shodedim be-tsaharayim ('The Noonday Robbers') was first published in Ha-Shaḥar (1877) and afterward appeared in book form. The fate of his fourth novel, Ha-yetomim ('The Orphans'), is somewhat singular. The first instalment appeared in Zederbaum's monthly, Ha-Mitspah, of which only four numbers were published in St. Petersburg in 1886. Ten years later another part appeared in Ner ha-Ma'aravi, a Hebrew monthly published in New York, which was also soon discontinued.

Berman was one of the purists in maskilic Hebrew, who insisted that no foreign words or idioms be used. A letter from Berman on this subject, and a reply by R. A. Braudes favouring expansion and modification of the language, were published in Joshua Mezach's Gan Peraḥim (Vilna, 1881).

== Publications ==
- "Shenot ra'inu ra'ah" [The Years Wherein We Have Seen Evil]. Ha-Melitz. 1 (15–19). 1861.
- Ha-shodedim ba-tsohorayim [The Noonday Robbers]. Vienna: P. Smolensky. 1877.
- "Le-zekher olam" [Everlasting Remembrance]. Ha-Melitz. 19 (88–95). November–December 1883.
- "Pesel Mikah" [The Graven Image of Micah]. Ha-Melitz. 20 (19–43). March–June 1884.
- "Ḥovevei Tsion" [Lovers of Zion]. Ha-Melitz. 25. 1885.
- "Ha-yetomim" [The Orphans]. Ha-Mitspah. 1–4. 1886.
- "Ha-yetomim (continued)" [The Orphans]. Ner Ha-Ma'aravi. 1. New York: Society for the Advancement of Hebrew Literature in America. 1895.
