= Hinduism by country =

Percentage of Hindus by country in 2010, according to the Pew Research Center

Hinduism has approximately 1.2 billion adherents worldwide, which represents 14.9% of the world's population. In 2012, Hinduism (15%) was the third largest religion in the world, behind Christianity (31.5%) and Islam (23.2%), as well as Unaffiliated (16.3%). Pew Research Center data shows the global Hindu population grew steadily from 2010 to 2020 and is expected to keep rising. This increase is driven largely by higher fertility rates in India and Nepal and by growing Hindu populations in regions receiving more migrants.

The two Hindu-majority countries are India and Nepal and together account for more than 95% of the Hindu population worldwide. The past two centuries have seen large-scale migration of Hindus from Southeast Asia, to around the world. Countries with more than 500,000 Hindu residents and citizens are (in decreasing order) India, Nepal, Bangladesh, Indonesia, Pakistan, Sri Lanka, the United States, Malaysia, United Kingdom, Myanmar, Australia, Mauritius, South Africa, Canada, and the United Arab Emirates. Global data shows Hinduism is still largely concentrated in the Indian Subcontinent, but significant communities also exist in Southeast Asia, the Caribbean, and Oceania. WorldData.info reports that India holds most of the world’s Hindus, with notable populations in Nepal, Bangladesh, and Indonesia.

There are significant numbers of Hindu enclaves around the world, with many in South Africa, Canada, Australia and New Zealand. Hinduism is also practiced by the non-Indic people including the Balinese of Bali island (Indonesia), Tengger of Java (Indonesia), the Balamon Chams of Vietnam, and Butuanon people in Philippines. Outside South Asia, Hindu communities often adapt traditional practices to multicultural environments, including by modifying rituals, language use, and temple organization.

== Background ==
Hinduism is a heterogeneous religion and consists of many schools of thought. Hinduism includes a diversity of ideas on spirituality and traditions, but has no ecclesiastical order, no unquestionable religious authorities, no governing body, no prophet(s) nor any binding holy book; Hindus can be polytheistic, monotheistic, pantheistic, monistic, agnostic, humanist, or atheistic.

== Early migration ==
One of the first major waves of Hindus leaving South Asia was a result of colonialism in India during 19th and early 20th century. Under indenture contracts, many Hindus migrated far across the world to Guyana, Surinam, Trinidad, Mauritius, South Africa, Eastern Africa, Fiji, Burma and Malaysia. These were some of the first countries with Hinduism established outside of the Indian sub-continent, many of which still have a thriving Hindu community today. Migration has played a major role in spreading Hindu communities worldwide. Kramer and Tong report that many Hindu migrants have settled in North America, the United Kingdom, Australia, and East Africa, creating expanding diaspora networks

== Demographic estimates ==
Demographic estimates of Hindu populations by country have been published by the Pew Research Center in 2012, as well as US State Department's International Religious Freedom Report 2006.

By total number, India has the most Hindus. As a percentage, Nepal has the largest percentage of Hindus in the world, followed by India and Mauritius. The Hindu population around the world as of 2020 is about 1.2 billion, making it the world's third-largest religion after Christianity and Islam. Nearly 1.1 billion Hindus live in India. representing about 94% of the global Hindu population. According to a statistical study, an estimated 100 million Hindus live outside of India. In 2010, only two countries in the world had a majority of their population as Hindus – Nepal and India. In Mauritius, 47.9 percent of the population were Hindu, according to the 2022 census.

== By country ==
Sources used for the table below include the US State Department, the CIA World Factbook, adherents.com, thearda.com, and Pew Research Center. and as identified.

Hinduism by country
Region	Country	Hindu total	Percentage	Total population	Census year
South Asia/Central Asia	Afghanistan	10,511	0.03%	35,036,667	-NA-
Western Europe	Andorra	382	0.5%	82,887	2020
Caribbean	Anguilla	58	0.4%	13,452	2011
Caribbean	Antigua and Barbuda	379	0.4%	81,799	-NA-
South America	Argentina	4,000+	0.01%	40,301,927	-NA-
Oceania	Australia	684,000	2.7%	23,401,400	2021
Central Europe	Austria	11,000	0.1%	8,900,000	
Middle East	Bahrain	7,000 – 144,286 (Note: The estimates vary depending on whether temporary workers are included or not. The official census of the Bahrain government states that 99% of its citizens are Muslims, and the remaining 1% includes Jews, Christians, Hindus, and Bahais. According to a 2017 publication by Abdullahi An-Na'im, the Muslims in Bahrain constitute 99.3% of the total population.)	<1%–9.8%	708,573	
South Asia	Bangladesh	13,100,000	7.9%	165,000,000	2022
Caribbean	Barbados	1,055	0.46%	226,193	
Western Europe	Belgium	6,235	0.06%	10,392,226	
Central America and Caribbean	Belize	612	0.2%	294,385	
South Asia	Bhutan	185,700	22.6%–25%	742,737	
Southern Africa	Botswana	3,353	0.3%	1,372,675	
South America	Brazil	5,675–9,500	0.0029%–0.01%	192,755,799	
Southeast Asia	Brunei	131	0.035%	374,577	
West Africa	Burkina Faso	150	0.001%	14,326,203	
Central Africa	Burundi	8,391	0.1%	8,390,505	
Southeast Asia	Cambodia	41,988	0.3%	13,995,904	
North America	Canada	828,200	2.3%	36,990,141	2021
Central Europe	Czech Republic	2,404	0.023%	10,436,560	
East Asia	China	20,000	<0.1%	1,412,600,000	
South America	Colombia	8,876	0.02%	44,379,598	
East Africa	Comoros	711	0.1%(approx)	711,417	
Balkans	Croatia	449	0.01% (approx)	4,493,312	
North America	Cuba	23,927	0.21%	11,394,043	
Middle East	Cyprus	4,640	0.4%	1,160,987	2015
Central Africa	Democratic Republic of the Congo	30,000	0.18%	65,751,512	
Western Europe	Denmark	5,468	0.1%	5,468,120	
East Africa	Djibouti	99	0.02%	496,374	
Caribbean	Dominica	145	0.2%	72,386	
North Africa	Egypt	2,700	0.003%	82,761,244	2010
East Africa	Eritrea	4,907	0.1% (approx)	4,906,585	
Eastern Europe	Estonia	295	0.027%	1,094,564	
Oceania	Fiji	261,136	27.9%	935,974	
Western Europe	Finland	5,000	0.1%	5,238,460	
Western Europe	France	121,000	0.2%	63,718,187	
Eastern Europe	Georgia	465	0.01% (approx)	4,646,003	
Western Europe	Germany	130,000	0.15% (approx)	82,660,000	
West Africa	Ghana	12,500	0.05% (approx)	22,931,299	
Western Europe	Gibraltar	628	2.0%	32,194	
Caribbean	Grenada	630	0.7%	89,971	
Caribbean	Guadeloupe	2,300	0.5%	460,000	
South America and Caribbean	Guyana	190,966	24.9%	769,095	
Central Europe	Hungary	3,307	0.03%	9,603,634	2022
South Asia	India	1,053,000,000	79.8%	1,320,000,000	(2011 Census)
Southeast Asia	Indonesia	4,781,776	1.66%	288,315,089	2025
Middle East	Iran	20,000	<0.1	65,397,521	
Western Europe	Ireland	14,300	0.30%	4,761,865	2016
Middle East	Israel	c.500–1,400	0.01%	9,412,850	2020
Western Europe	Italy	108,950	0.2% (approx)	60,418,000	
West Africa	Ivory Coast	18,013	0.1%	18,013,409	
Caribbean	Jamaica	1,836	0.07%	2,780,132	
East Asia	Japan	30,000	<0.1	127,433,494	
Middle East	Jordan	10,185	0.1	10,185,500	2020
Central Asia	Kazakhstan	1,878	0.01%	18,632,000	2020
East Africa	Kenya	60,000	0.1%	37,000,000	
Middle East	Kuwait	300,667 (Note: The estimates vary depending on whether temporary workers – with no residency nor right to openly practice their religion – are included or not. The official Kuwaiti government census data does not count Hindus as residents or citizens of Kuwait.)	12%	2,505,559	
Eastern Europe	Latvia	179	0.012%	1,481,823	
Middle East	Lebanon	4,926	0.1% (approx)	4,925,502	
Eastern Europe	Lithuania	344	0.01%	2,561,000	
Southern Africa	Lesotho	2,125	0.1% (approx)	2,125,262	
West Africa	Liberia	3,196	0.1% (approx)	3,195,931	
North Africa	Libya	6,037	0.1%	6,036,914	
Western Europe	Luxembourg	336	0.07% (approx)	480,222	
Southern Africa	Madagascar	19,449	0.1%	19,448,815	
Southern Africa	Malawi	2,721 – 2,726	0.02% – 0.2%	13,603,181	
Southeast Asia	Malaysia	1,949,850	6.3%	30,949,962	
Caribbean	Martinique	1,317	0.3%	439,202	
South Asia	Maldives	37	0.01%	369,031	
Southern Africa	Mauritius	474,000	39%	1,261,000	2022
Eastern Europe	Moldova	433	0.01% (approx)	3,200,000	
North Africa	Morocco	200	0.0006	32,781,860	2011
Southern Africa	Mozambique	10,453 – 41,811	0.05% – 0.2%	20,905,585	
Southeast Asia	Myanmar	252,763	0.5%	50,279,900	2014
South Asia	Nepal	23,677,744	81.19%	29,164,578	2021
Western Europe	Netherlands	96,110 – 200,000	0.58% – 1.20%	16,570,613	
Oceania	New Zealand	144,753	2.9%	4,115,771	
Western Europe	Norway	23,140	0.5%	4,627,926	
Middle East	Oman	96,147 – 182,679	3% – 5.7%	3,204,897	
South Asia	Pakistan	5,217,216	2.17%	240,458,089	2023
Central America	Panama	9,726	0.3%	3,242,173	
Southeast Asia	Philippines	32,711	<0.1%	102,000,000	
Western Europe	Portugal	7,396	0.07%	10,642,836	
Central Europe	Poland	2,421	0.008%	30,575,000	
Caribbean	Puerto Rico	3,550	0.09%	3,944,259	
Middle East	Qatar	422,118	15.1%	2,795,484	2020
East Africa	Réunion	55,409	6.7%	927,000	
Eastern Europe	Russia	143,000	0.1%	141,377,752	
Oceania	Samoa	38	0.02% (approx)	187,429	
Saint Kitts and Nevis	Saint Kitts and Nevis	860	1.82%	47,195	2011
Middle East	Saudi Arabia	303,611 (Note: The estimates vary depending on whether temporary workers – with no residency nor right to openly practice their religion – are included or not. The Saudi Arabian government mandates that all Saudi citizens must be Muslims, and it prohibits public practice of Hinduism and other non-Muslim religions.)	0.6% – 1.1%	27,601,038	
East Africa	Seychelles	5,508	5.4%	102,812	2022
West Africa	Sierra Leone	2,458 – 6,145	0.04% – 0.1%	6,144,562	
Southeast Asia	Singapore	280,000	5.0%	5,600,000	2011
Central Europe	Slovakia	5,448	0.1% (approx)	5,447,502	
Central Europe	Slovenia	500	0.025% (approx)	2,009,245	
Eastern Africa	Somalia	8,278	0.06%	13,797,204	2015
Southern Africa	South Africa	505,000	0.9%-1.1%	49,991,300	
East Asia	South Korea	12,452	0.015% (approx)	49,044,790	
Western Europe	Spain	75,000	0.11%	48,692,804	2024
South Asia	Sri Lanka	2,671,000	12.6%	21,200,000	2011
South America and Caribbean	Suriname	120,623 – 128,995	22.3% – 27.4%	470,784	
Southern Africa	Eswatini	1,700 – 2,266	0.15% – 0.2%	1,133,066	
Western Europe	Sweden	7,044 – 10,837	0.078% – 0.12%	9,031,088	
Western Europe	Switzerland	28,708-50,000	0.38%-0.6%	7,554,661	
East Africa	Tanzania	50,000	0.11%	39,384,223	
Caribbean	Trinidad and Tobago	240,100	18.2%	1,056,608	2011
Southeast Asia	Thailand	65,000	0.1%	65,068,149	
Oceania	Tonga	100	0.1%	103,043	
North Africa	Tunisia	120	0.001%	11,303,942	2016
Middle East	Turkey	843	0.001%	83,614,362	2020
Eastern Europe	Ukraine	42,386	0.1%	42,386,400	
East Africa	Uganda	100,000	0.3%	38,225,447	
Middle East	United Arab Emirates	490,000 (Note: The estimates vary depending on whether temporary workers – with no residency nor right to openly practice their religion – are included or not. 80% of the UAE population consists of non-citizen temporary workers, and an estimated 25% of these workers may be Hindu. Only Sunni Muslims can be naturalized new citizens in the UAE. According to the US State Department, the federal constitution of the UAE designates Islam as the official religion, and Islam is also the official religion of all seven of the individual emirates in the federal union. The Government does not recognize all non-Muslim religions and only a limited number of Christian groups are granted legal recognition in UAE. Non-Muslim and non-Christian religions such as Hinduism are not recognized legally in any of the emirates.)	5 - 20%	9,682,000	
Western Europe	United Kingdom	1,020,000	1.7%	60,776,238	2017
North America	United States	3,338,210	1.0%	332,000,000	2020
Caribbean	United States Virgin Islands	528	1.9%	28,054	
Central Asia	Uzbekistan	895	0.0025%	34,558,900	2020
Southeast Asia	Vietnam	70,000	0.07%	85,262,356	
Middle East	Yemen	155,614	0.7%	22,230,531	
Southern Africa	Zambia	16,068	0.14%	11,477,447	
Southern Africa	Zimbabwe	3,000	0.02%	12,311,143	
Total		1,120,000,000	14.9%	7,500,000,000	

== By region ==
These percentages were calculated by using the above numbers. The first percentage, in the 4th column, is the percentage of the population that is Hindu in a specific region (Hindus in the region * 100/total population of the region). The last column shows the Hindu percentage compared to the total Hindu population of the world (Hindus in the region * 100/total Hindu population of the world). The historical development of Hinduism in India and Nepal continues to influence how the religion is viewed and practiced globally. Williams and Moktan note that political and cultural traditions in these countries shape modern Hindu identity beyond South Asia

(Note: Egypt, Sudan, and other Arab Maghreb countries are counted as part of North Africa, not the Middle East).

Hinduism in Africa
Region	Total Population	Hindus	% of Hindus	% of Hindu total
Central Africa	193,121,055	N/A	N/A	N/A
East Africa	193,741,900	667,694	0.345%	0.071%
North Africa	202,151,323	5,765	0.003%	0.001%
Southern Africa	137,092,019	1,269,844	0.926%	0.135%
West Africa	268,997,245	70,402	0.026%	0.007%
Total	885,103,542	2,013,705	0.225%	0.213%

Hinduism in Asia
Region	Total Population	Hindus	% of Hindus	% of Hindu total
Central Asia	92,019,166	149,644	0.163%	0.016%
East Asia	1,527,960,261	130,631	0.009%	0.014%
West Asia	274,775,527	3,187,673	1.5%	0.084%
South Asia	1,437,326,682	1,068,728,901	70.05%	98.475%
Southeast Asia	571,337,070	6,386,614	1.118%	0.677%
Total	3,903,418,706	1,074,728,901	26.01%	99.266%

Hinduism in Europe
Region	Total Population	Hindus	% of Hindus	% of Hindu total
Balkans	65,407,609	449	0.001%	0.001%
Central Europe	74,510,241	163	0%	0%
Eastern Europe	212,821,296	717,101	0.337%	0.076%
Western Europe	375,832,557	1,313,640	0.348%	0.138%
Total	728,571,703	2,030,904	0.278%	0.214%

Hinduism in the Americas
Region	Total Population	Hindus	% of Hindus	% of Hindu total
Caribbean	24,898,266	279,515	1.123%	0.030%
Central America	41,135,205	5,833	0.014%	0.006%
North America	446,088,748	2,131,127	0.478%	0.191%
South America	371,075,531	389,869	0.105%	0.041%
Total	883,197,750	2,806,344	0.281%	0.263%

Hinduism in Oceania
Region	Total Population	Hindus	% of Hindus	% of Hindu total
Oceania	38,552,683	791,615	2.053%	0.071%
Total	38,552,683	791,615	2.053%	0.071%

== See also ==
- List of Hindu empires and dynasties
- Lists of Hindu temples
- List of religious populations
- Christianity by country
- Islam by country
- Ahmadiyya by country
- Jewish population by country
- Baháʼí Faith by country
- Buddhism by country
- Sikhism by country
- List of countries by irreligion
