= Hinduism in Africa =

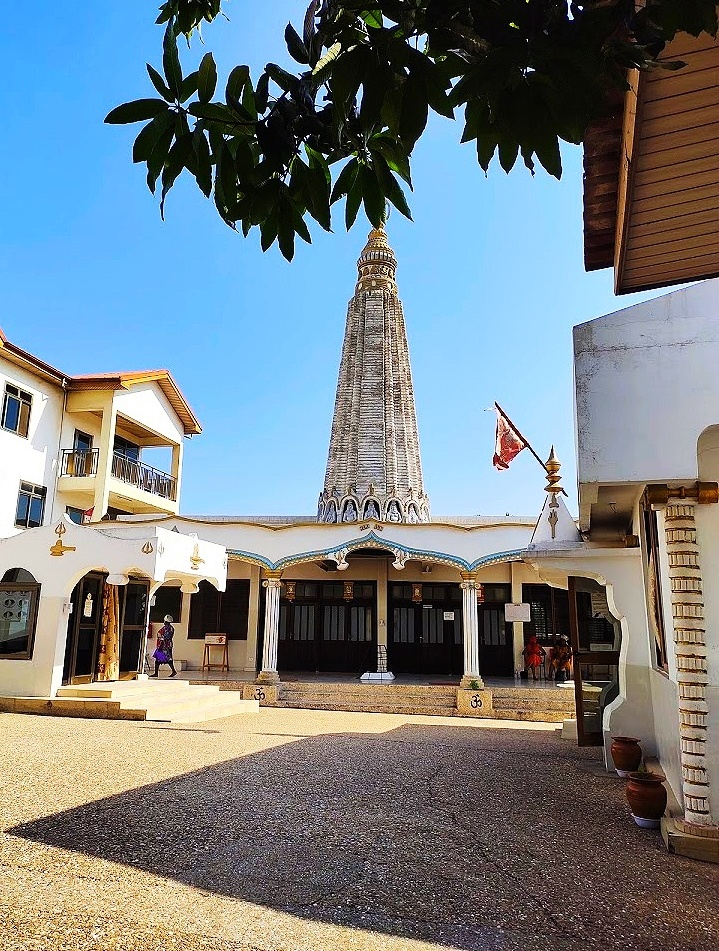
African Hindu Monastery in Ghana is the first Hindu Monastery in Africa

Mauritius is the only African Union country where Hinduism is the dominant religion, with about half of the Mauritian population as followers in 2011. Hinduism is the second largest religion in Réunion (6.7%) and Seychelles (5.4%).

== History ==
Hinduism took root in Africa from the late 19th century onwards through the spread of the British Empire, which colonized huge swaths of land throughout Asia and Africa, including almost the entirety of the Indian subcontinent. Many Indians were recruited as indentured servants throughout the British Empire, settling mainly in the British colonies of Southern and Eastern Africa. The descendants of these settlers often chose to remain in Africa after the end of colonial rule, developing Indo-African communities that remain to this day.

Hinduism is a non-proselytizing religion and was usually not propagated to the same lengths or through the same means as Christianity and Islam. As such, it has mostly been confined to practise by the Indo-African communities of these countries. However, in post-colonial Africa, a small-scale movement for Hinduism and its propagation outside the Indo-African community has occurred, spearheaded by such individuals as Swami Ghanananda, the first Hindu swami of Ghana. Today, Lagos, Nigeria, which did not receive an original influx of Indian migrants as did countries such as South Africa and Uganda, is home to over 25,000 Hindus, mostly local converts and more recent, post-independence Indian immigrants. This was primarily the work of International Society for Krishna Consciousness (ISKCON) missionaries.

While Hinduism has been cited as possessing many parallels to traditional African religions, it has received opposition from the entrenched Christian elites and Muslim minorities of these countries. The Swaminarayan faith has a sizable following in Africa. Several temples belonging to the faith have been built in Kenya, Uganda, Tanzania and Zambia.

== West Africa ==
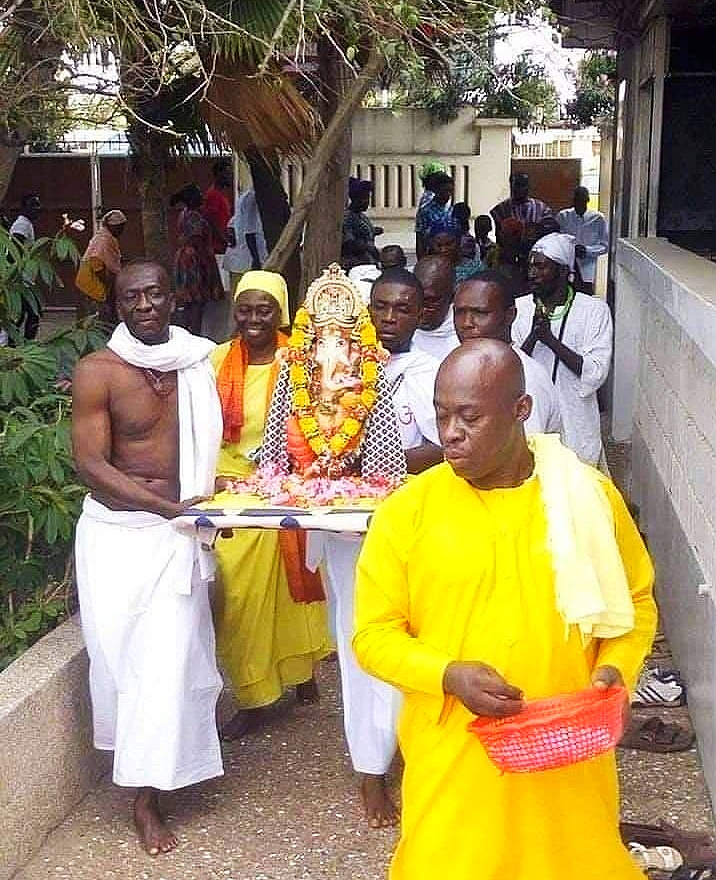
Hindus in Ghana celebrating Ganesh Chaturti

Hinduism is a recent phenomenon in West Africa most notably Ghana where it is said to be the fastest growing religion. However the Hindu presence in other West African states is limited to Indian people residing in countries like Sierra Leone and Liberia.

== East Africa ==
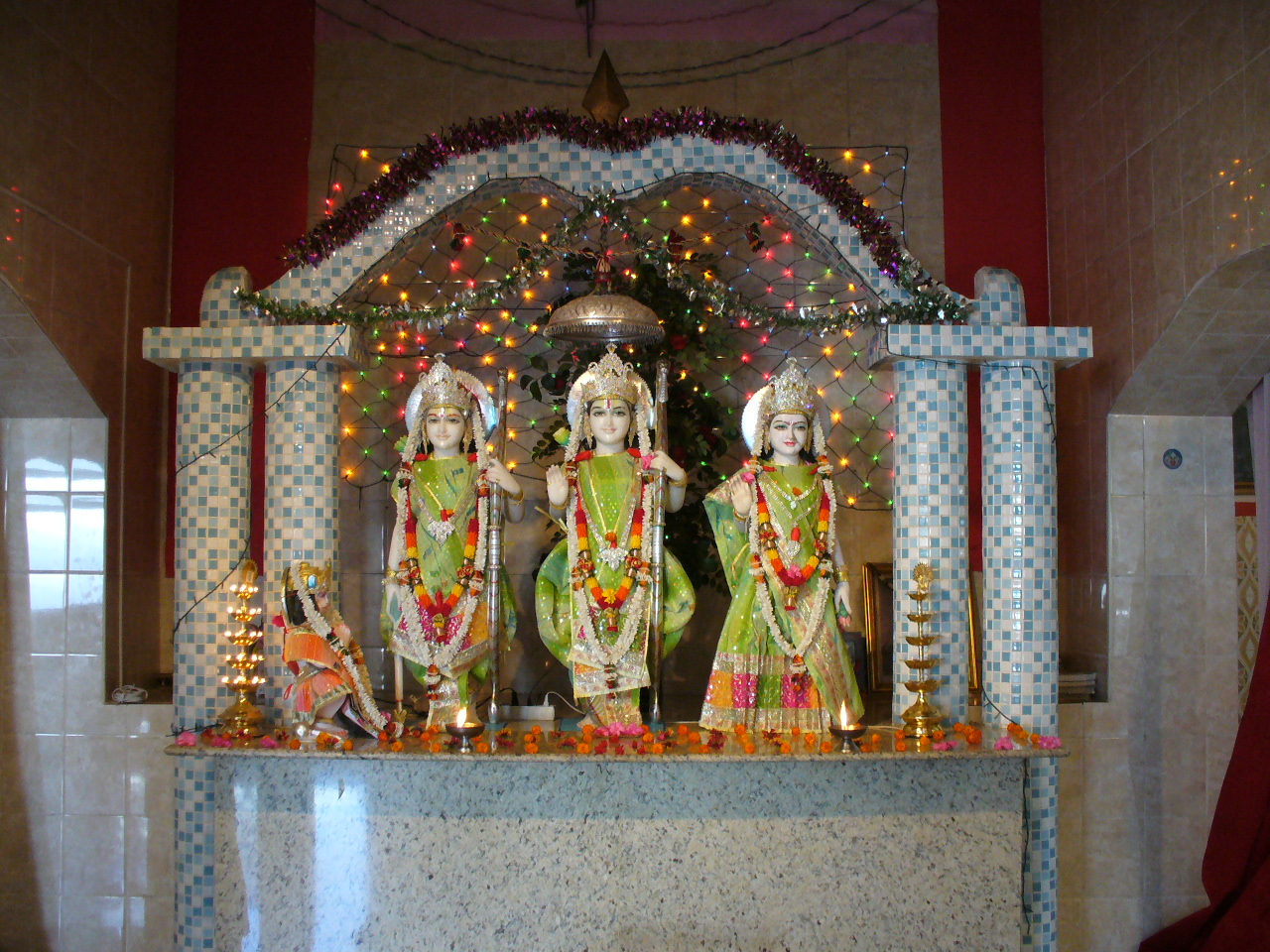
Hindu temple in Salamanga, Mozambique.

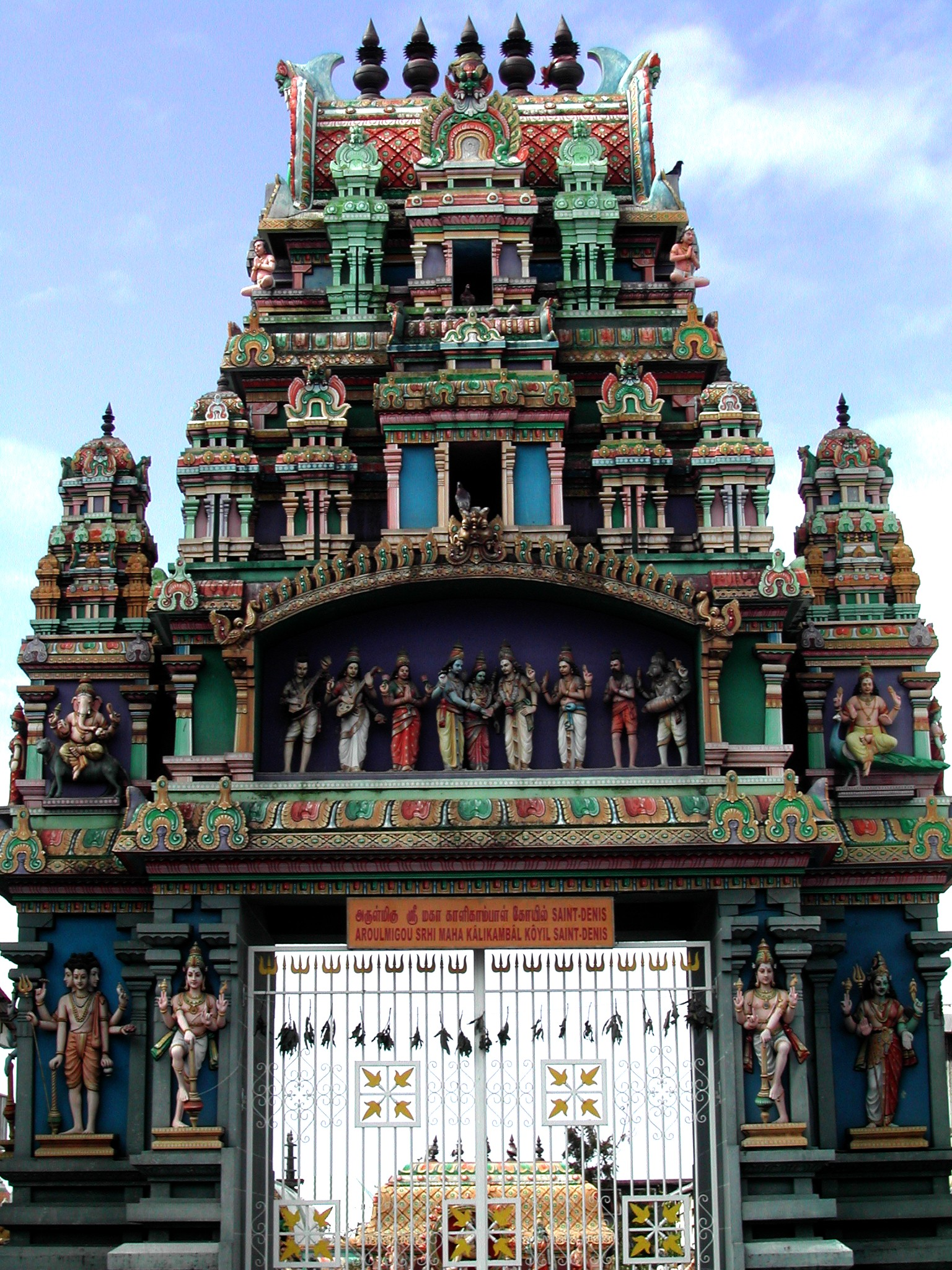
Sri Maha Kalakambal Temple in Saint-Denis, Réunion

The Eastern region of Africa is home to many migrant communities from India. This region is home to various Hindu temples mainly in Tanzania, Uganda and Kenya. The country of Mauritius, retaining a Hindu majority is found in Eastern Africa.

About 6.7% of the population of Réunion follows Hinduism, making it the second largest religion in Réunion.

Hindus is the second largest religion in Seychelles forming 5.4% of the population There is also a small number of Hindus in Madagascar.

== Southern Africa ==
The largest concentration of Hindus in the continent can be found in the Southern region of Africa. South Africa is home to more than 500,000 Hindus.

== See also ==
- Religion in Africa
- List of Hindu temples
- Hinduism by country
- Hindu eschatology
