= Hinduism in the Netherlands =

Dutch Hindus

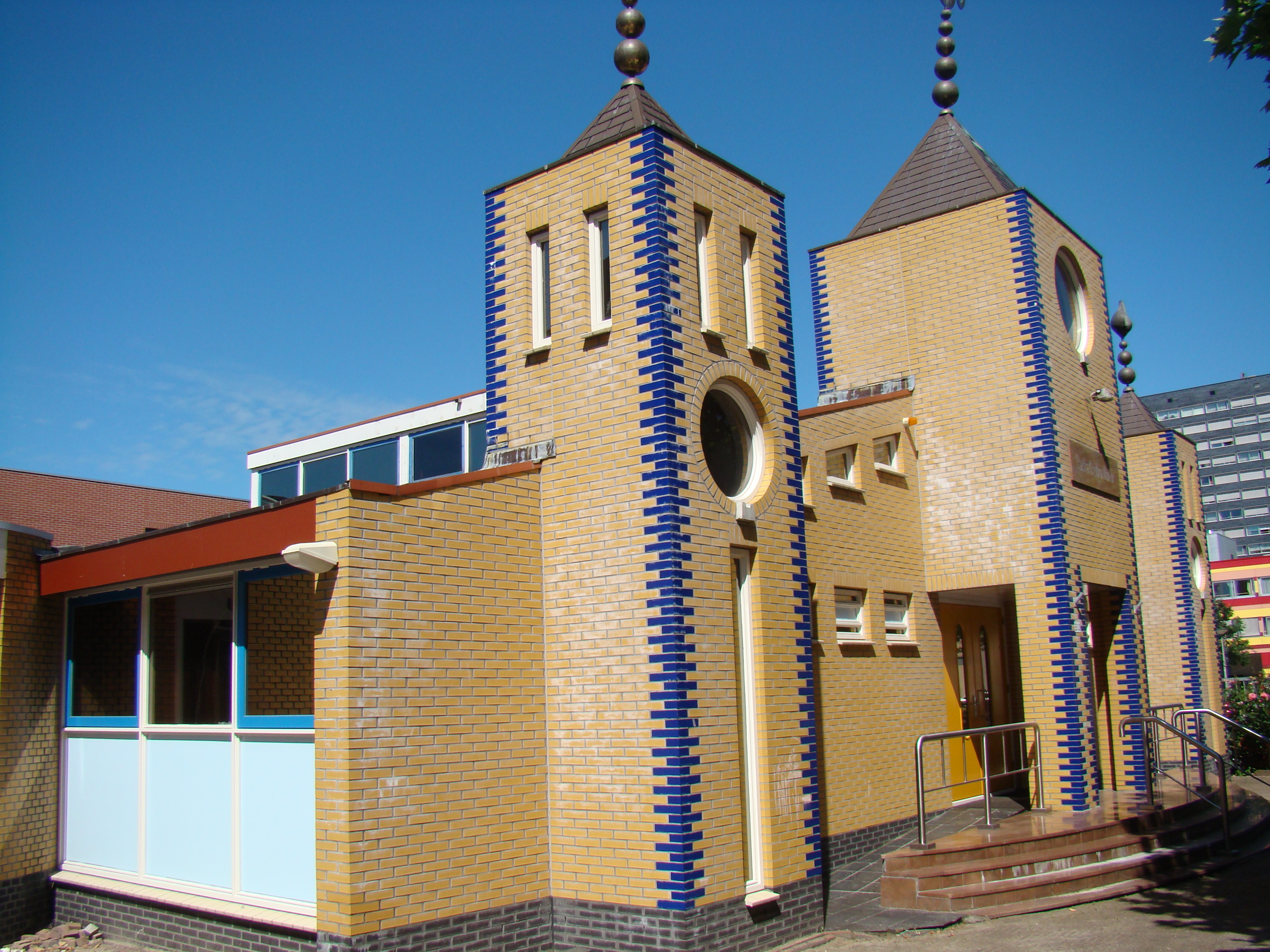
- Radha Krishna Mandir in Amsterdam Nieuw-West, Netherlands

Total population
- 150,000-200,000 (1.0%) of total population

Regions with significant populations
- Amsterdam, The Hague, Amstelveen, Eindhoven, Utrecht, Rotterdam

Religions
- Hinduism; Majority; Sanātanī; Minority; Arya Samaj and Others

Languages
- Sacred; Sanskrit; Majority; Sarnami, Dutch; Minority; Other languages spoken by the Hindu diaspora

Hinduism is the third largest religious group in the Netherlands, after Christianity and Islam; representing about 1.0% of the Dutch population in 2019. After the United Kingdom's and Italy's, the Netherlands' is the third largest Hindu community in Europe. There are between 200,000 – 240,000 Hindus currently living in the Netherlands, the vast majority of whom migrated from Suriname – a former Dutch colony in South America. There are also sizable populations of Hindu immigrants from South Asia and Caribbean countries as well as a smaller number of Western adherents of Hinduism-oriented new religious movements.

== History ==
The presence of a significant number of Hindus in the Netherlands is a relatively modern development; in 1960, it is estimated there were only ten Indian families in the country, who between them presumably comprised the bulk of the Hindu population. In 1971, the Centraal Bureau voor de Statistiek (CBS) recorded around 3,000 adherents. In the 1970s, however, the number sharply increased. This was due to the immigration of the Indo-Surinamese ("Hindustanis"), people of Indian origin whose families had emigrated to Suriname as indentured workers in the late nineteenth century. With Surinamese independence in 1975, growing concern about their future in the new country caused about a third of the Hindustani population to leave Suriname and emigrate to the Netherlands. The Indo-Surinamese were predominantly Hindu, and as a result the Hindu population increased tenfold over the decade to 34,000 in 1980, continuing to climb to 61,000 in 1990 and 91,000 in 2000.

Currently, 80% of all Dutch Hindus are of Surinamese origin with most of these Surinamese Hindus having their roots from the Bhojpuri-speaking regions of India as a result of the Indian indenture system.

More recent arrivals have been from Sri Lanka as a result of the civil war.

== Demographics ==
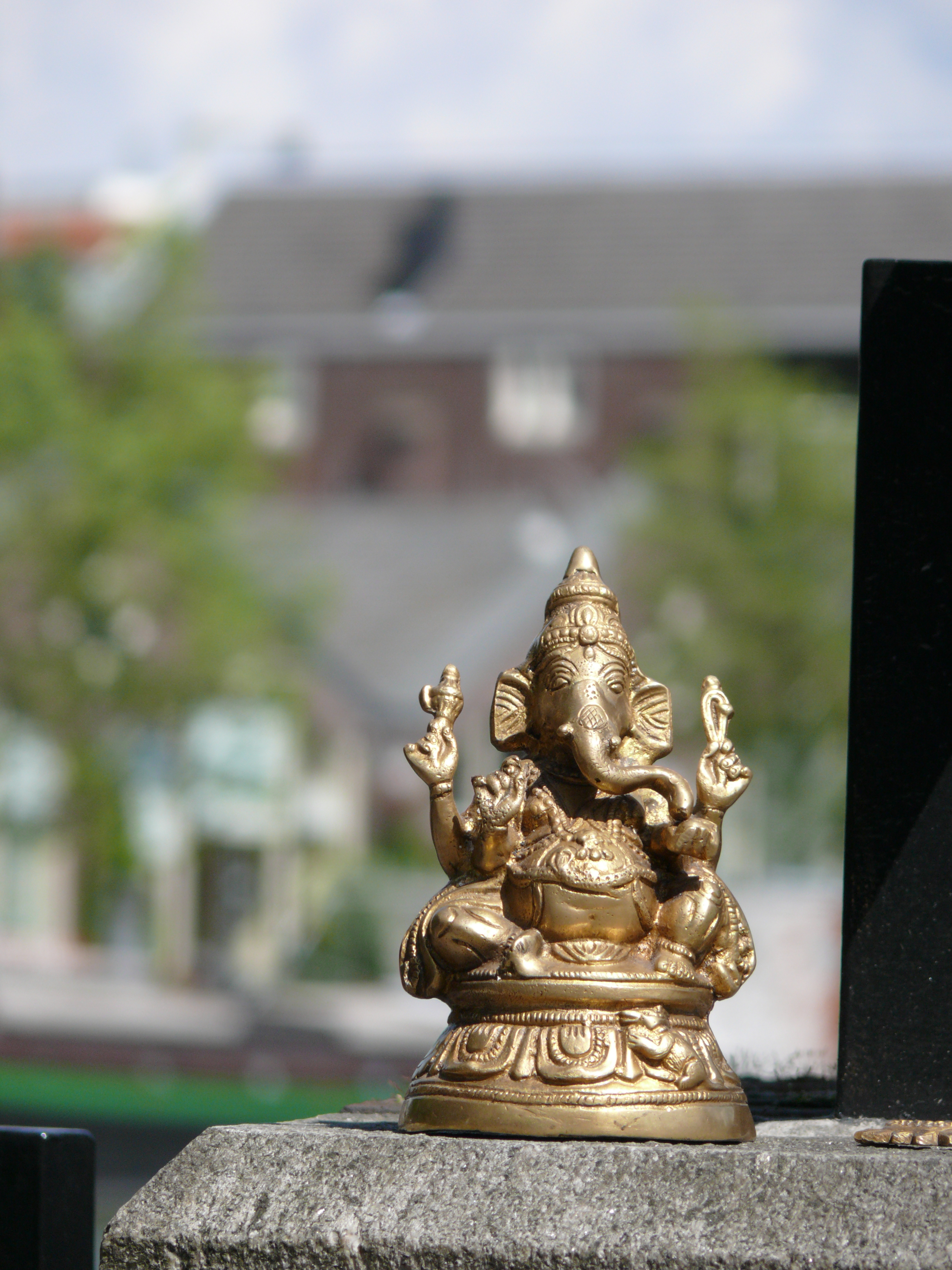
A small statue of Ganesha in central Amsterdam.

The changes in Hindu population from 2010-19.

Year	Percent	Increase
2010	0.6%	-
2011	0.6%	-
2012	0.6%	-
2013	0.7%	+0.1%
2014	0.6%	-0.1%
2015	0.6%	-
2019	1.0%	+0.4%

The largest group of Hindus in the Netherlands is composed of immigrants, mainly from Suriname but with numbers also directly from India and Sri Lanka. The estimated number of Hindus can vary dramatically depending on which source is used, ranging from 100,000 to comfortably over 200,000. A 1997 study suggested that there were around 100,000 adherents. A 2006 estimate by the CBS concurred with this number, breaking it down as 83,000 of Surinamese origin, 11,000 of Indian origin, 5,000 other non-Europeans, and 1,000 Europeans. However, the Hindu Council of the Netherlands estimated around 215,000, of which 160,000 were from Suriname, 15,000 from the Indian subcontinent, and 40,000 from elsewhere. This figure tallies very closely with those put out by the High Level Committee on the Indian Diaspora, who stated that the Netherlands had 200,000 people of Indian origin, and 15,000 Non-Resident Indians; it is not clear if the two figures have a common source or if they are simply conflating people of ethnic Indian background with practising Hindus.

A 2003 study gave the total Indo-Surinamese population - Surinamese originally of Indian descent - as 160,000, of which 80%, or around 130,000, were Hindu. The largest regional populations, according to the 2003 study, were in South Holland (60,000), mostly clustered around The Hague, and North Holland (31,200); between them, the two provinces accounted for over 70% of the overall population. The same study suggested that there were around fifty temples and around 250 priests, of whom half were full-time workers.

The percentage of Hindus by provinces in the Netherlands:

Region	Percent of Hindus
Groningen	0.3%
Friesland	0.1%
Drenthe	0.0%
Overijssel	0.3%
Flevoland	0.7%
Gelderland	0.1%
Utrecht	0.5%
North Holland	0.6%
South Holland	1.8%
Zeeland	0.2%
North Brabant	0.3%
Limburg	0.1%

== Hindu denominations ==
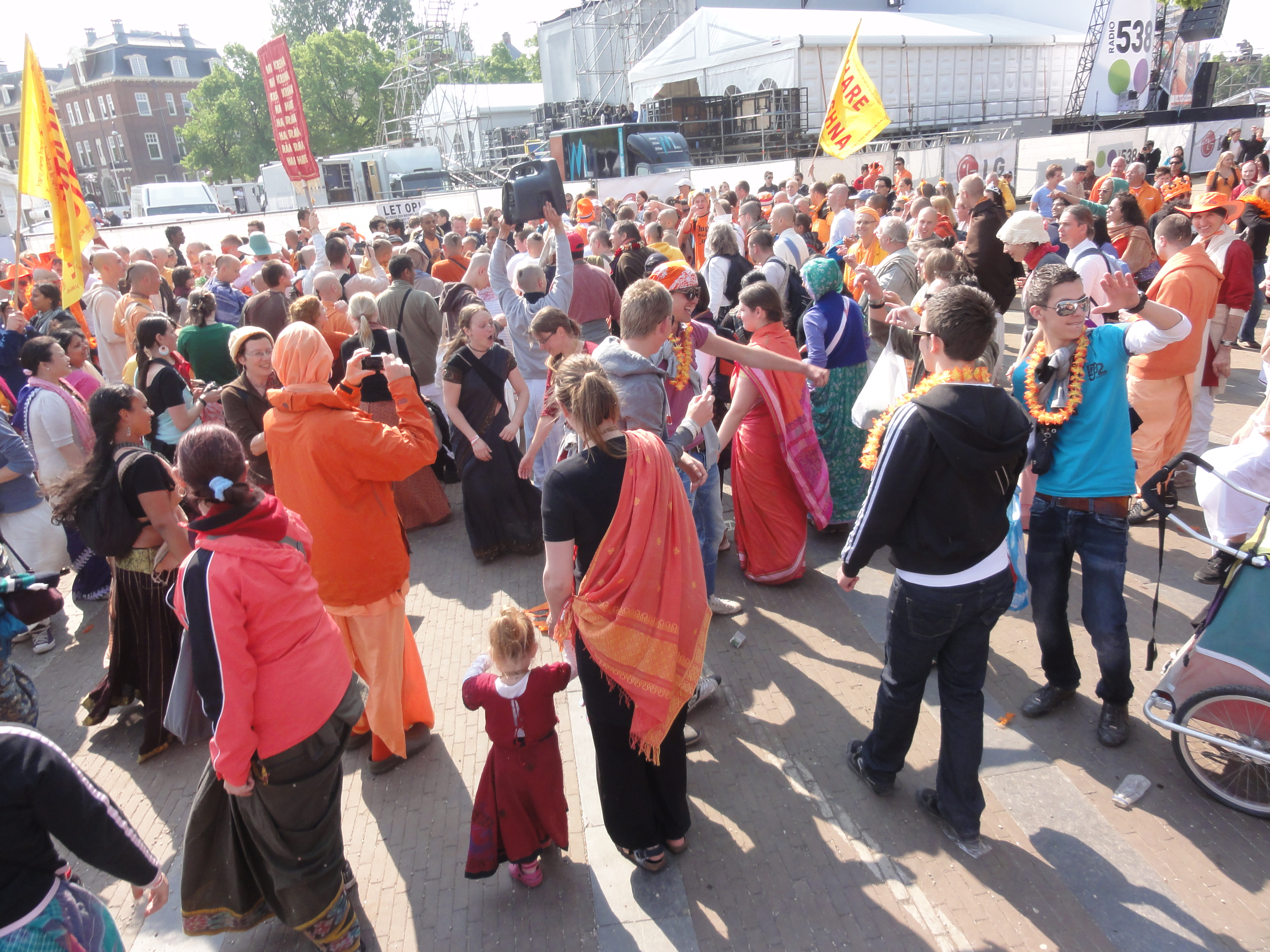
Hare Krishna members celebrating in the Museumplein on Queensday in Amsterdam

The bulk of this population, around 80%, belong to the Sanatana dharma, whilst the remaining 20% belong to the sectarian Arya Samaj movement. There are other groups belonging to the more recent "guru movements", such as the Hare Krishnas or the Transcendental Meditation movement, and finally a small number who practice a mixture of more "new age" or theosophical beliefs which include elements linked to Hinduism.

== Hinduism in overseas territories of the Netherlands ==
=== Sint Maarten ===
Hinduism is practised by 5.2% of the population of Sint Maarten. Hindus are represented by the St. Maarten Hindu Organization, which holds regular satsangs (prayers) in the Sun Building every first and third Sunday of every month.

=== Curaçao ===
Hinduism is the second largest religion in Curaçao, although it is only practised by 2% of the total population. There is a large Hindu temple in Willemstad, capital of Curaçao.

== Community ==
The Hindu Council of the Netherlands represents Hinduism in the Netherlands. The council governs Hindu temples, spiritual care, education and employs influential community leaders among its ranks. The organization was known for being heavily targeted, causing Hindus in the Netherlands to be underrepresented in several areas such as politics, sports and media.

There are five Hindu schools funded by the Hindu community in the country, which are deemed as national schools. The schools follow the same curriculum as other schools. The curriculum also includes Hindi, teaching of the Hindu epics such as Ramayana and Mahabharata, and celebrating Hindu festivals.

== Literature ==
- Freek L. Bakker, Hindus in the Netherlands, Berlin: LIT Verlag 2018, ISBN 978-3643910394.

== See also ==
- Hindu denominations
- Hinduism by country
- Hinduism in the United Kingdom
- Hinduism in Suriname
- Hinduism in the West Indies
- Persecution of Hindus
- List of Hindu temples in the Netherlands
- Hinduism in Guadeloupe
