= Indian Colombians =

colombianos indios
- (Colombia) (India)

Total population
- 153 - 5,000

Languages
- Spanish, English, Hindi, Punjabi, other Indian languages

Religion
- Hinduism, Sikhism, Catholicism, Islam

Related ethnic groups
- Asian Colombians

Indian Colombians are Indian immigrants in Colombia and their descendants. The Indian community in Colombia is not as large as other Asian Colombian communities, but there are some places in Colombia where they have an established presence with Indian-owned businesses. The vast majority of Colombians who have Indian ancestry are of Indo-Caribbean origin, this includes those from Guyana, Suriname, and Trinidad and Tobago. Of Indian nationals in Colombia, most cite work related motivations as their reason for relocating to Colombia. Many of them came from Punjab.

== History ==
The first recorded arrival of Indians in Colombia was during the 19th century.

At the beginning of the 20th century, Indian Muslim migrants settled in the towns of the Cauca River valley, some just temporarily and others permanently, to engage in the commercial activity demanded by the new working population of the nascent sugar industry. These immigrants brought a variety of products to rural areas, both granting credit and accepting barter.

The migration from India into Colombia increased between the 1960s and the 1980s, with immigrants settling in areas of the Pacific region, such as Cali and on the Caribbean coast of Colombia.

In recent years, Indian migrant workers in the oil industry have come to many Latin American countries, including Colombia. In 2014, Migración Colombia reported that 343 Indians entered Colombia, with only 48 of them being women.

Today, small communities of Indian Colombians can be found in Bogotá, Cali, Barranquilla, and Medellín, and Santa Marta.

== Culture and religion ==
In cities like Barranquilla, there are important Indian restaurants and events, as well as established Indian businesses.

With the arrival of Indians, particularly immigrant workers from Trinidad and Tobago, Guyana, and Suriname, came the introduction of numerous prominent Indian religions such as Hinduism, Sikhism, and Islam.

=== Hinduism ===
Hinduism is a minority faith in Colombia represented mainly by the Hare Krishna devotees and Indian and Nepalese expats. The International Society for Krishna Consciousness (ISKCON) has temples in 20 cities in the country. The community consists of about 700 members. There are also many hotels and restaurants in the country named after the Hindu deities as a tribute to Colombian–Indian relations.

== See also ==
- Colombia–India relations
- Immigration to Colombia
- Indian diaspora
- Romani people in Colombia
