= Hinduism in Botswana =

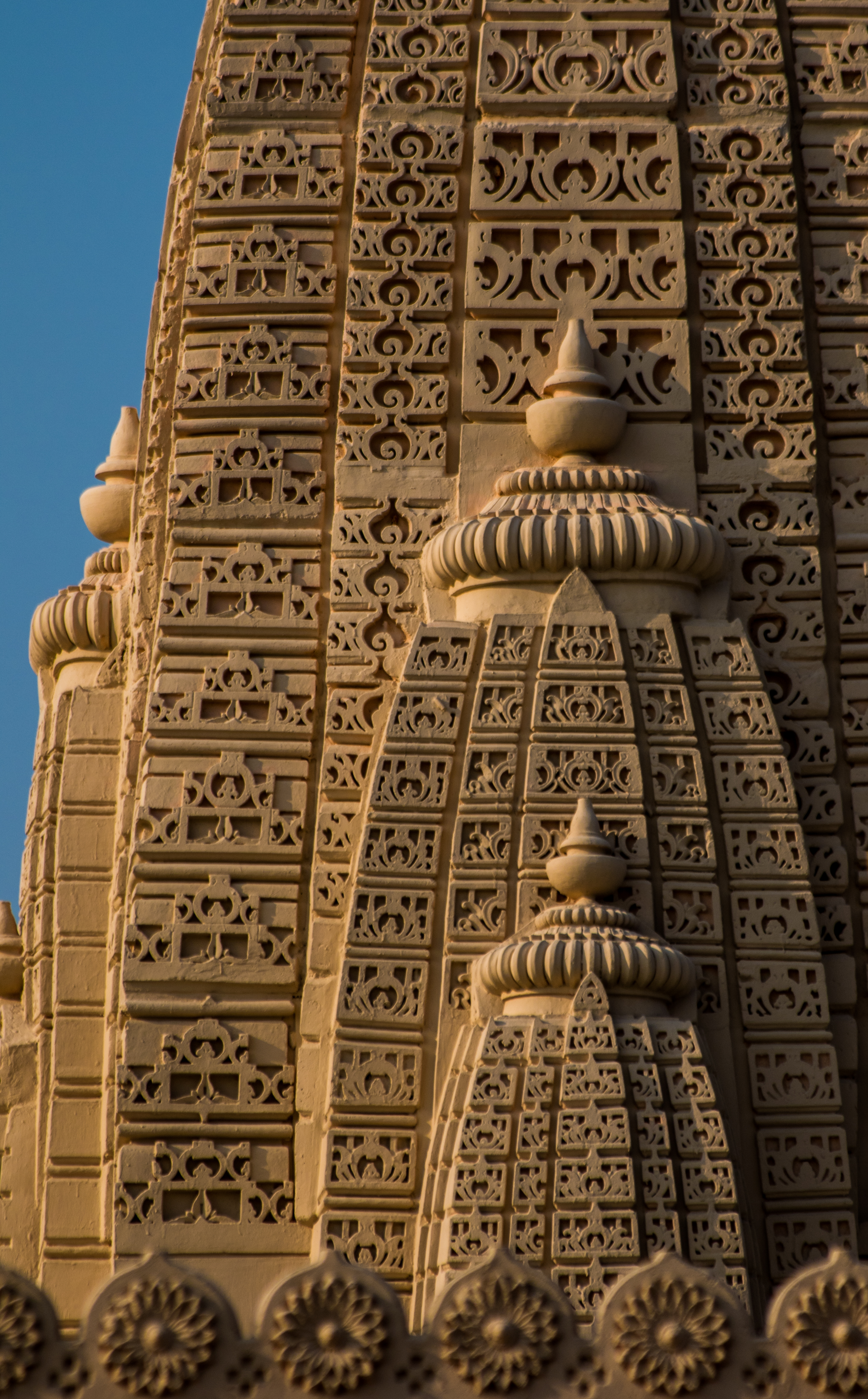
BAPS Swaminarayan Hindu Mission, Gaborone

Hinduism is a minority religion practised by 0.3% of the population of Botswana. The practice of Hinduism in Botswana is concentrated in and around Gaborone and Selebi-Phikwe. The community of Hindus began to form in the early 20th century with the beginning of immigration from India to Botswana. Most Hindus in Botswana are of Indian descent.

== Demographics ==
The 2001 census of Botswana listed approximately 3,000 Hindus. Members of Hindu community estimated that these figures significantly understated their respective numbers. The 2011 census stated about 3353 Hindus in Botswana. Among these 3230 are non-migrants and 123 are migrants. Hinduism constituted 0.3% of the total population of Botswana in 2001 which remain constant in 2011 census. Hinduism constituted 0.3% of the Non-migrant population and 0.1% of the migrant population.

== Temples ==
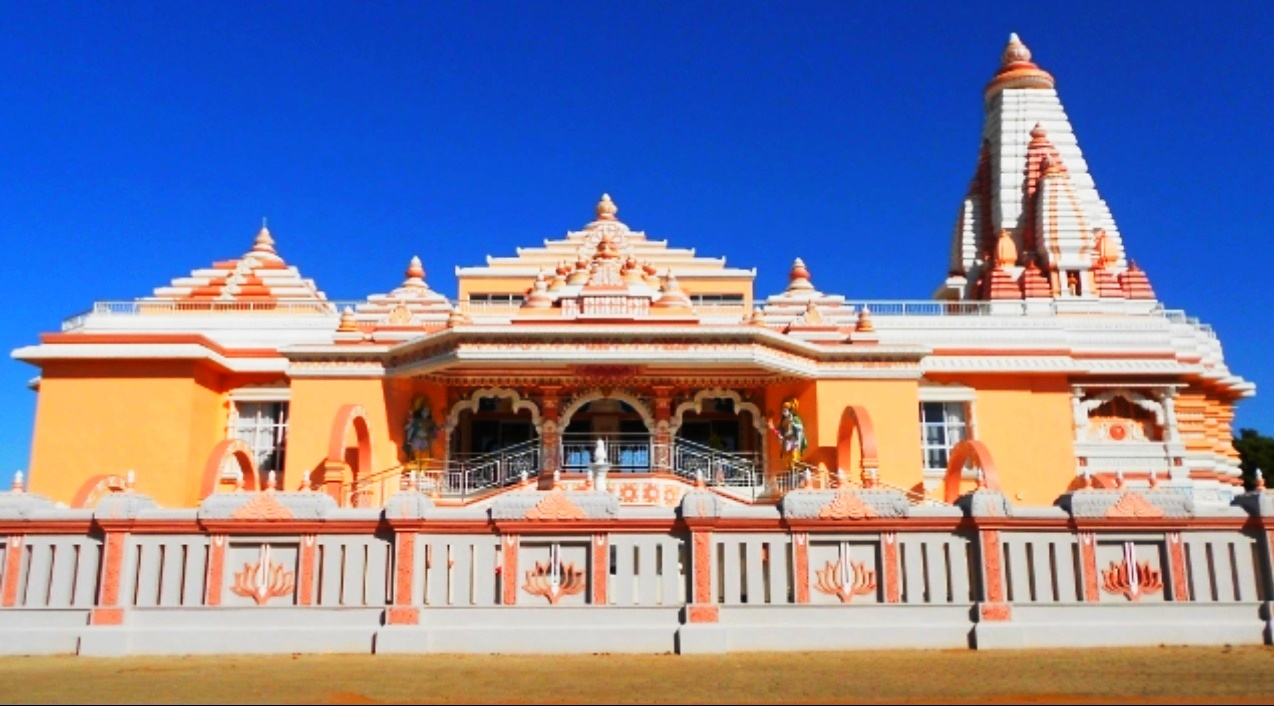
ISKCON temple in Gaborone

As of January 2016, there are five Hindu temples in Botswana, including the Sai Temple and ISKCON Temple in Gaborone. With the growth of the community, a number of region-based community associations have sprung up. There is already a Hindu temple in Gaborone, and another in Selebi-Phikwe. A gurudwara is also been built in the capital city. Plans have been made for the construction of a Swaminarayan temple, a Sai Baba Centre, a Venkateswara Temple and an ISKCON Centre at various sites in Botswana.

The following are the major Hindu temples in Botswana:

- ISKCON (International Society for Krishna Consciousness), Gaborone
- Shiva-Vishnu Temple, Selebi-Phikwe
- The Hindu Hall, Gaborone
- Sri Balaji Temple, Block 8, Gaborone

=== ISKCON BOTSWANA Krishna Balaram Mandir, Gaborone ===
The ISKCON Botswana temple is situated in Gaborone West Phase 2, opposite Baobab Primary School. It is a magnificent temple orange and maroon in colour that has attracted many people from all parts of the country to see its magnificent art work that can be seen on the outside and especially on the inside. It is the home of Sri Sri Kirishna & Balarama.

=== The Hindu Hall, Gaborone ===
The Hindu Hall in Gaborone is situated behind the "Caltex" filling station, located in the area adjacent to the "Maru-a-Pula Robots" (traffic lights). All the major Hindu festivals (Maha Shivaratri, Rama Navami, Dussehra, Diwali etc.) are observed in this temple.

At the entrance to the Hindu Hall, is located the 'Navagraha Temple', with the deities of the 9 planets. Immediately adjoining thereto, is the 'Lord Shiva Temple' with a 'Shiva Lingam' at the centre, which is surrounded on the sides by the idols of Lord Subrahmanya, Goddess Mother Parvati, and Lord Ganesha.

On the inside of the wall of the Shiva Temple, there is a small cavern, which couches one idol of Lord Shiva, Mother Parvati, with Lord Baby Ganesh and Lord Baby Subrahmanya on their laps.

There is also a 'Nandi' facing the Shiva Lingam.

Inside there is a big hall from which the temple draws its name. Upon the dais, there are idols of Lord Rama, Mother Sita, Lakshmana and Lord Hanuman. There is also an idol of Lord Shiva.

=== Sri Balaji Temple, Block 8, Gaborone ===
The Botswana Hindu Charities Trust built the Sri Balaji Temple in Gaborone in the classical Dravidian architectural style. The temple is one of its kind in the Southern African region and become a cultural attraction in Gaborone, after earning the people's admiration for the architectural and the sculptural beauty. The temple has cost over Rs. 2 crores to build.

The temple has 10 sanctum sanctora to house Lord Balaji and his consorts Sridevi and Bhudevi as the presiding deity, Lord Ganesha, Lord Anjaneya (Hanuman), Lord Shiva, Mata Vaishnodevi, Lord Ayyapa, Lord Muruga and the Navagrahas. All Mulavar Vigrahas and Utsav Murthies were imported from India. The doors for the Maha Mandap and the Rajagopuram were imported from Kerala. The doors of Maha Mandap depict the scenes from Krishna Leela whereas the doors of Raja Gopuram depict the Dasa Avathars.

== See also ==
- Hinduism in Uganda
- Hinduism in Tanzania
