= Hinduism in the Czech Republic =

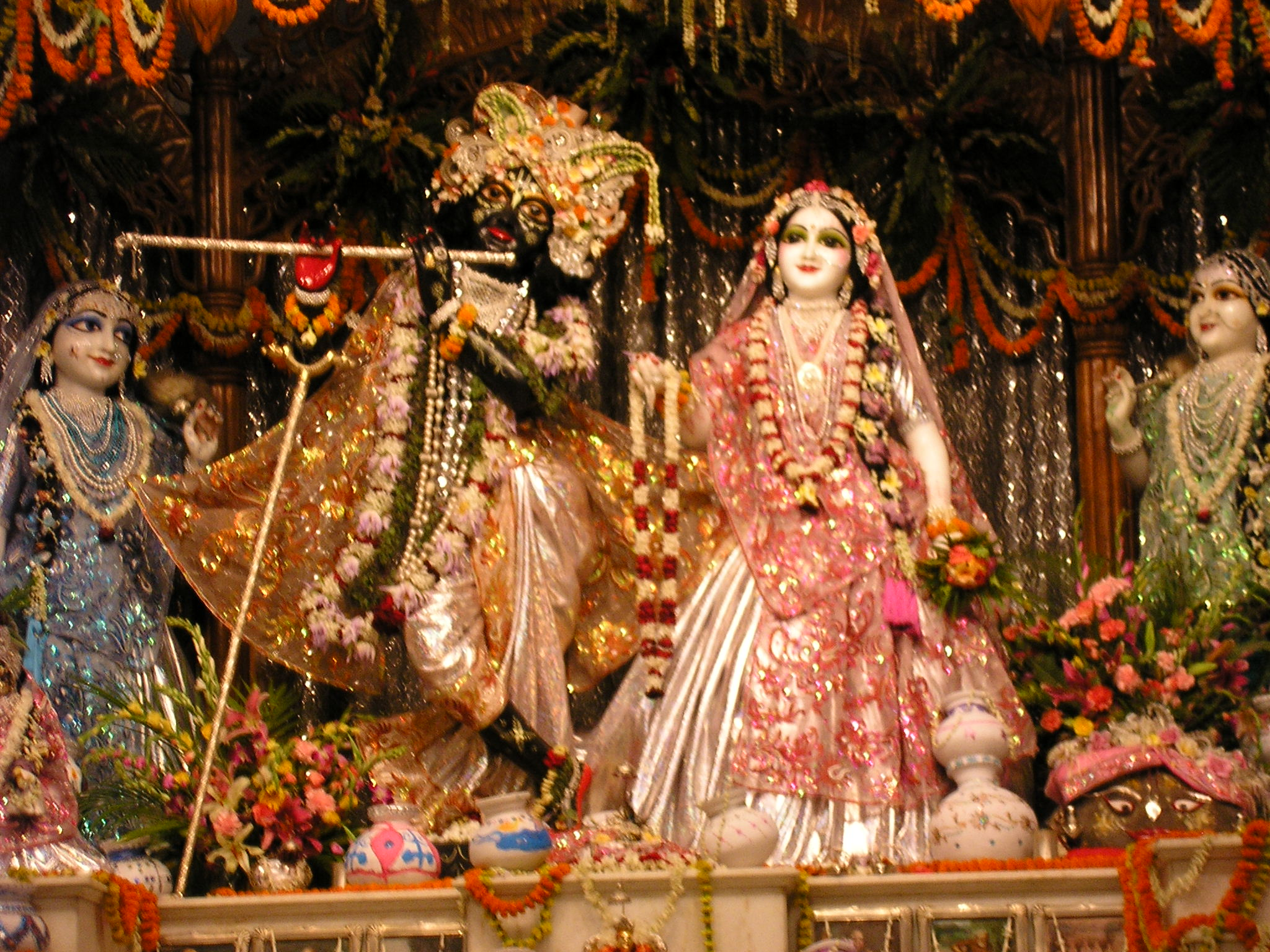
Murtis (statues) symbolizing Krishna (left) and his lover Radha (right)

Hinduism is a minority faith in the Czech Republic followed by 0.02% (2,024) of the population as of 2021. The majority of the individuals do not explicitly affiliate with a specific religious group. 1,226 people declare themselves generally as "Hindu". Hindus are represented by three communities: Czech Hindu Religious Society, Hare Krishna Movement and Vishva Nirmala Dharma. The Czech Republic is not a major destination from India so a majority of the Hindu population within the country is local. Census numbers might underrepresent the scope of Hindu tradition within the country as many practitioners view practices like yoga or bhakti as a lifestyle rather than a formal religion and leave the census columns blank. Sociological research indicates that Czech communities following Asian traditions often maintain fluid organizational boundaries with practitioners rejecting rigid labels.

== Communities ==
=== Czech Hindu Religious Society ===
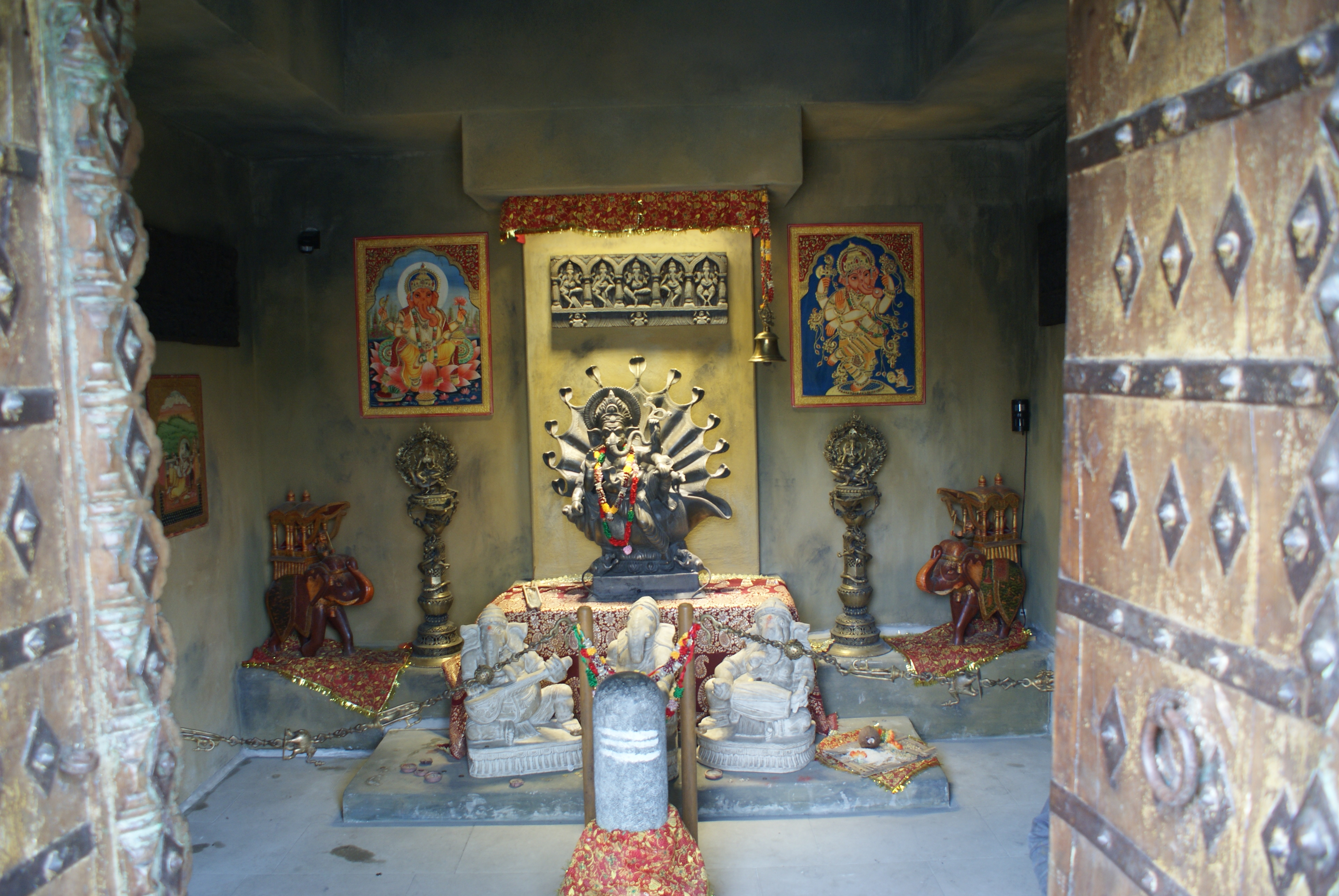
Hindu temple in Prague Zoo dedicated to Ganesha

The Česká Hinduistická Náboženská Společnost (Czech Hindu Religious Society) was registered as a religious community in 2002. The roots of this community in the Czech environment precede 1989. Mahamandaleshwar Paramhans Swami Maheshwarananda created a system called "Yoga in Daily Life" that a large number of local yogis practiced. This community grew around this group of yogis. In 2015 this group's official name was changed to Višva Guru Díp Hindu Mandir. While there were 427 people in this community in 2011, the number has declined to 93 in 2021.

=== ISKCON ===
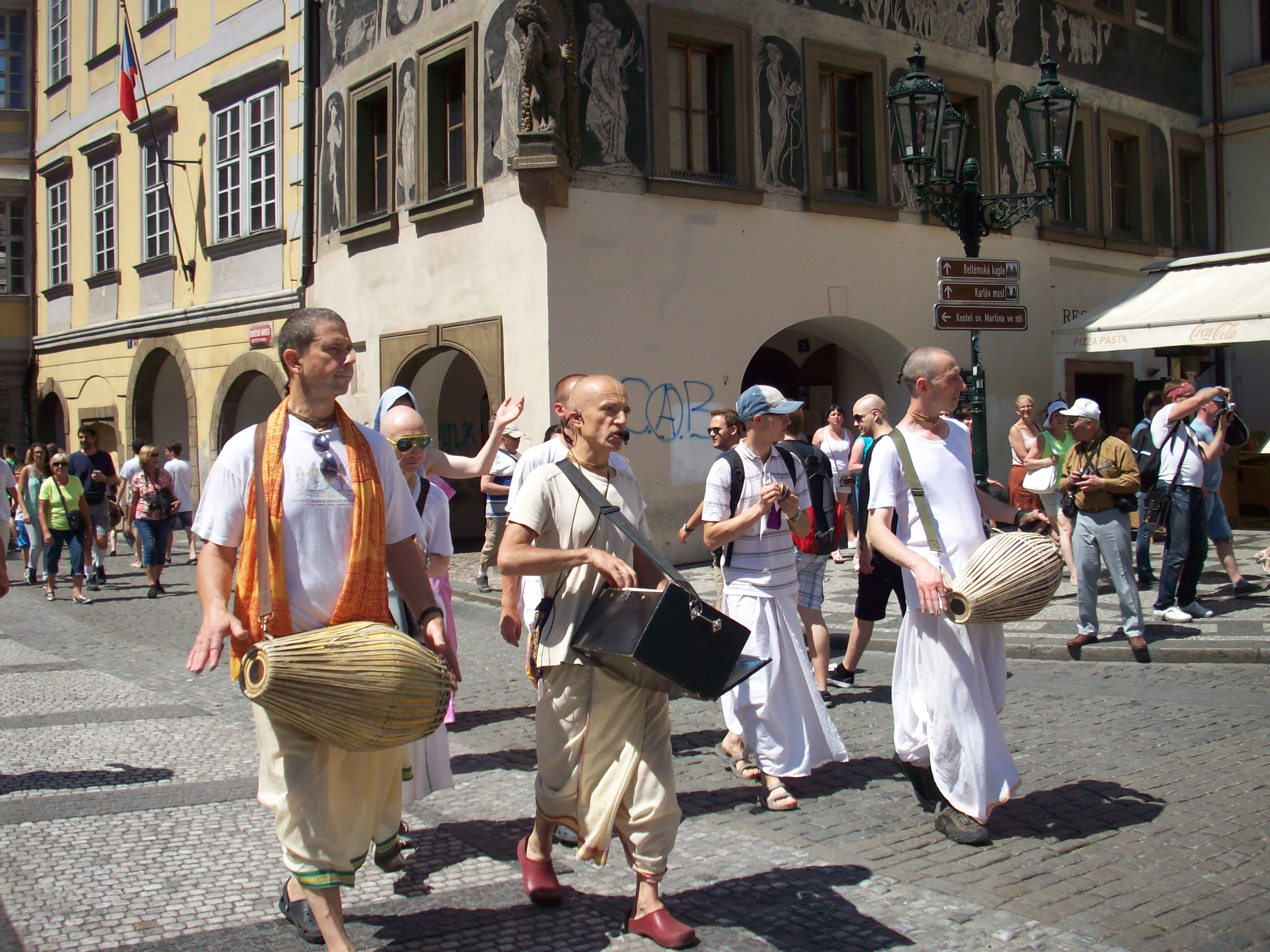
Hare Krishna musicians at Prague, Czech

Hare Krishna is part of Hindu Dharma or Sanatan Dharma . The Hare Krishna movement started in former Czechoslovakia in the 1960s. The first Czech devotee, Jayagurudeva dasa (Jaromír N.) was initiated by Srila Prabhupada in France in 1976. By 1977 devotees from Germany and Switzerland were visiting the communist Czechoslovakia under the guise of "gymnastics" or yoga meetings. Texts were translated and smuggled into the country by emigrants and by 1985, the communist secret police were monitoring around 150 members that made up approximately 10 cells of the "Hare Krishna sect".

After the collapse of the communist regime, the movement experienced expansion. The first official center, founded by returning Czech emigrant Turiya dasa, was a farmstead known as Krishna's Court. Tensions arose between groups of householders and monks which resulted in a split, the expulsion of Turiya dasa, and the departure of many active members. Due to this schism, efforts to establish a parallel gurukula (primary school) for children also collapsed.

It has four temples in the country. There are 200 devout followers of Hare Krishna in the Republic. Census records indicate 673 members in 2011 and a drop to 455 in 2021. The members of the Hare Krishna movement have been troubled by accusations of cult-like behavior. During early post-communist years the group faced attacks from the media and a hostile public. Until public anxiety shifted towards Islam in 2001, public anti-cult campaigns heavilty targeted ISKCON throughout the 1990s. ISKCON then joined other targeted groups to form the Society for Religious Freedom to advocate against anti-cult initiatives. This helped lobby for easier state registration laws. By 2002, the movement was officially registered by the Czech state and received symbolic state acceptance. ISKCON is not a religion as such but follows Hinduism or Sanatan Dharma which is a complete way of life.

=== Vishva Nirmala Dharma ===
This group was founded by Nirmala Srivastava, who took missionary trips to the Czech Republic following the fall of the Iron curtain in 1989. In 2007, Vishva Nirmala Dharma became a registered religious community in the country.

== Legal Status and State Recognition ==
Due to the two-tiered nature of Czech Act No. 308/1991 Coll., Hindu and other Asian religious movements face institutionalized barriers. While the first stage of registration only requires 300 signatures, it offers no tangible state benefits. The second stage of registration grants the right to teach religion in public schools, access to chaplaincies in prison or the military, and state funding. However this stage of recognition requires 10,000 adult signatures.

Critics note that the signature barrier is politically maintained to protect established Christian churches from competition. Some scholars suggest that this legal framework is inherently discriminatory towards minority Eastern faiths as Christian groups maintain "special rights" due to their legacy exemptions even if their current membership has decreased to fewer than 200 adherents. Meanwhile growing traditions like ISKCON cannot reach the 10,000 signature threshold and are not granted "special rights".

== Demographics ==
The Demographics of Hindus in Czech Republic:

Historical Population
Year	Pop.	±%
2001	1,061	—
2011	2,408	+127.0%
2021	2,024	−15.9%

Year	Percent	Increase
2001	0.01%	-
2011	0.02%	+0.01%
2021	0.02%	-

Hindu Community	2001 census	2011 census	2021 census
Hare Krishna Movement	294	673	455
Vishva Nirmala Dharma	not included	1098	93
Czech Hindu Religious Society	not included	427	250
Other forms	767	210	428
Total	1061	2408	1226

== See also ==
- Hinduism in Slovakia
- Hinduism in Guadeloupe
