= Romani people in Colombia =

Romane manusha andi Colombia (Romani)

Total population
- 8,000

Regions with significant populations
- Bogotá, Girón, and Cúcuta

Languages
- Colombian Spanish and Romani

Religion
- Roman Catholicism, Romani mythology, Islam

There are some 8,000 Romani people in Colombia scattered throughout the country. In 1999, the Colombian government recognized the Romani people as one of Colombia’s ethnic minorities, so they can access educational, health and legal convenience. Thus, the Romani language has remained to be recognized as a minority language.

== History ==
Christopher Columbus took four Romani people whose punishment, introduced by the Spanish rulers for the crime of being Romani and wishing to preserve their own traditions and language, had been commuted to firm effort in the galleys.

In 1582, Spanish authorities passed a command outlawing the arrival of the Romani people to the American colonies.

For five hundred years, from the beginning of the 13th century until 1864, many Romani were enslaved and persecuted in Eastern Europe. The new law banned the importation of slavery to the region, and demanded that any slaves from other countries who arrived would immediately be permitted to their freedom. As a result of the law, many Romani escaped European slavery by heading to Colombia, and the migration waves from Europe to the Americas had later continued throughout the 20th century and up to the present day.

The Roma arrived in Colombia after independence, taking advantage of the loosening restrictions that had kept them out of Spanish America during the colonial era. Often they were fleeing the difficult discriminatory situations they faced in the 19th century in Europe and during the two world wars. Although the Colombian constitution in 1991 guarantees their right as a "nation" and not just as individuals, there has been historic discrimination against the Colombian Roma. Many have been accused of participating in illegal drug trafficking.

== See also ==
- Gitanos
- Indian Colombians
