= Hinduism in Croatia =

Hinduism is a minor religion in Croatia.

== History ==
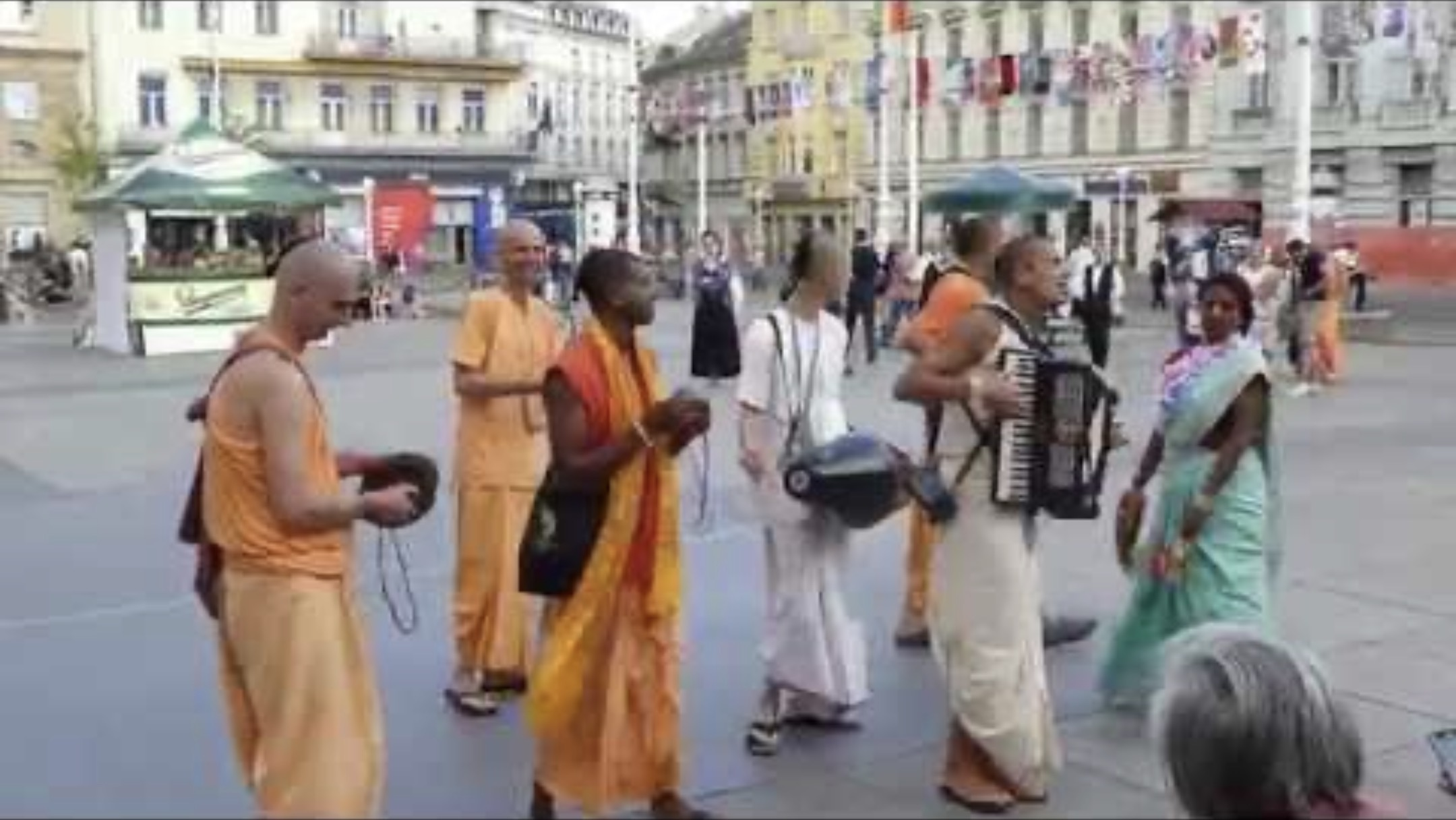
People singing ‘Hare Krishna’ in Zareb, Croatia

The Hindu Community in Croatia is small in size. A Croat-Indian Society was established in June 1994 and has been active in organizing social and cultural events, including classical dance performances, animation films based on Indian history, and various documentaries on India’s traditions. An Agreement of Cooperation was signed between the Diplomatic Academy of Croatia and the Ministry of External Affairs' Institute of Foreign Service. The International Society for Krishna Consciousness (ISKON) is officially recognized in Croatia and has nine centres. These centres are located in Osijek, Pula, Rijeka, Split, Varaždin, Vodice, Zadar, and Zagreb, which has two. In 2007, the Croatian government gave 500 square metres (5,400 sq ft) of land in Zagreb for Hare Krishna humanitarian work.

== Academic interest ==
Croatian scholars have long been interested in Indology. The Carmelite friar Ivan Filip Vesdin, also known as Paulinus a Sancto Bartolomaeo, visited the Court of the Maharaja in Travancore from 1776 and 1789. He was an early influence in the growth of Indology in Croatia and wrote several books on Indian culture and Indo-European languages, including a book on Sanskrit grammar, the first its kind in Europe. The University of Zagreb established their Department of Indology in 1962, with 50-60 students studying annually. It is now called the Department of Indology and Far East Studies. The university partners with the Indian Embassy to hold events, including their annual Hindi Day. In 2002, 29 leading Sanskrit scholars from around the world attended the Third Dubrovnik International Conference to discuss Sanskrit epics and Puranas. The Croatian Academy of Sciences and Arts has published proceedings from each conference in English.

== See also ==
- Hinduism in Estonia
- Hinduism in Martinique
