= Hinduism in Madagascar =

The history of Hinduism in Madagascar began with the arrival, as early as 1870, of mainly Gujaratis from the Saurashtra region of India. Most of them were Muslim (Khojas, Ismailis and Daoudi Bohras), but a small number were Hindus.

== Current status ==
In 2023, only 0.06% of the population were Hindu.

In 2006, many of these are business owners, or informational technology professionals who have lived in the country for generations. The majority spoke Hindi or Gujarati, although some other Indian languages were spoken. Younger generations spoke at least three languages, including French or English, Gujarati and Malagasy.

== See also ==
- Religion in Madagascar
