= Hinduism in Estonia =

Hinduism is a minority religion in Estonia followed by only 360 (0.027%) of its population as of 2021.

The religion was registered by the country along with Buddhism in the 1990s.

== Demographics ==
Historical Population
Year	Pop.	±%
2000	138	—
2010	295	+113.8%
2021	360	+22.0%

Year	Percent	Increase
2000	0.01%	-
2011	0.022%	+0.012%
2021	0.027%	+0.005%

The number of Hindus in Estonia is negligible. The 2000 census of Estonia showed 138 Hindus in Estonia.

According to the 2011 census, there are 295 people in Estonia following Hinduism. In the Census, there are 142 Hindus, 121 Hare Krishnas and 32 followers of Sahaja Yoga. About half of the Hindus live in Tallinn.

According to the 2021 Census, there are 360 people professing some form of Hinduism, with 300 labelled themselves as Hindus and 60 as Hare Krishnas.

== Temple ==
In June 2024, the biggest Hindu temple in Europe was built in Lilleoru, near Tallinn. It is 5500 square meters.

== See also ==
- Hinduism in Lithuania
- Hinduism in Russia
- Hinduism by country
- Buddhism in Estonia
