= Hinduism in Malawi =

Hinduism in Malawi arrived when Indian colonists and mercantilists were brought by the colonial British administrators in the late 19th and early 20th-century in what was then known as British Central Africa and later Nyasaland. They were a part of a global movement of workers to parts of East Africa, to help build infrastructure projects, establish services, retail markets and for administrative support. The immigrants, some educated and skilled but mostly poor and struggling in famine prone areas of Punjab, Gujarat, Uttar Pradesh, Bihar and West Bengal, helped construct the first railway line between Malawi and Mozambique.

Hinduism has a very small minority presence in predominantly Christian Malawi. The government tracks Christian and Muslim demographics, but does not recognize other religions separately, considers Hindus as well as the traditional African religions as a part of the "Others" category. The "Others" were about 3.1% in 2006.

According to the 1994 constitution of Malawi, many seats in its Senate were reserved for "major religious faiths of Malawi", and only Christianity and Islam are recognized as "major faiths". Malawi thus constitutionally barred people with faiths such as Hinduism from political representation in its Senate, and allowed only Christians and Muslims to hold the set aside seats of political power. However, the Senate of Malawi was never actually constituted, and removed from the Constitution in 2001.

After colonialism ended, Hindus (along with Jains and Sikhs) were discriminated against in East Africa, where various East African governments promoted Africanization enacting laws and policies that required commercial and professional sectors of the economy to be owned by non-Europeans, non-Asians, and only indigenous Africans. Many Hindus previously residing in Malawi migrated to other countries during this period, particularly the United Kingdom starting with the 1960s.

Gujarati, Sindhi and Bengali are the main languages of hindus in Malawi. Sub-traditions of Hinduism such as the Brahma Kumaris have a Raja Yoga Centre at Trikum Mansion in Blantyre.
