= Hinduism in Colombia =

Hinduism is a minority faith in Colombia represented mainly by the Hare Krishna devotees and Indian and Nepalese expats. The International Society for Krishna Consciousness (ISKCON) has temples in 20 cities in the country. The community consists of about 700 members. There are also many hotels and restaurants in the country named after the Hindu deities as a tribute to Colombian–Indian relations.
