= Hinduism in Réunion =

Indian ethnic group

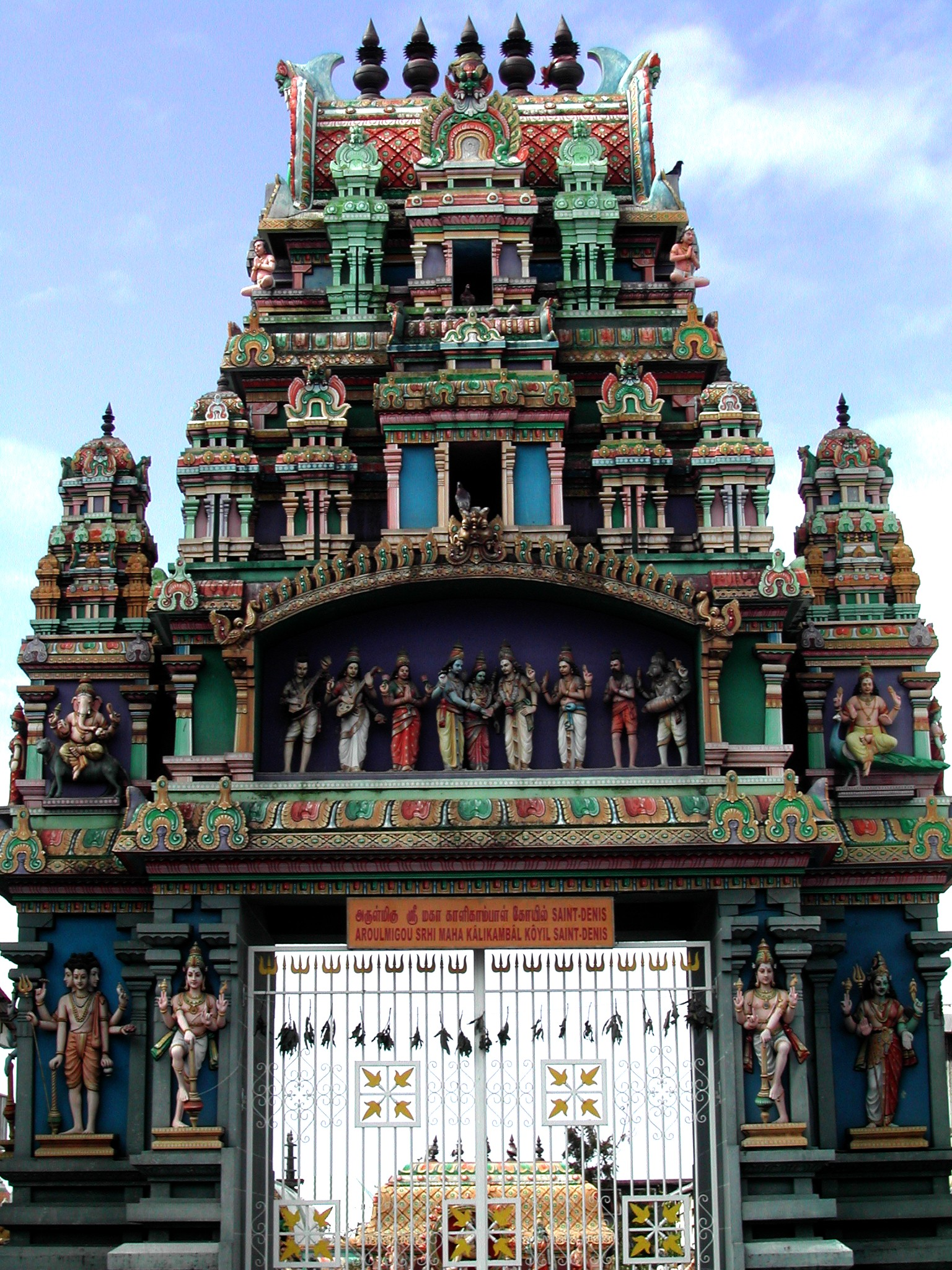
Sri Maha Kalakambal Temple in Saint-Denis, Réunion

Hinduism in Réunion constitutes a significant part of the island's population. The island of Réunion is home to approximately 200,000 Indian descendants amongst the roughly 800,000 strong population. Estimates of practicing Hindus stand at around 8.65%. The exact number of Hindus in the country is uncertain, because ethnic and religious questions are forbidden in French censuses, and members of the Indian population sometimes cross-identify with Roman Catholic and Hindu faiths.

The most recent arrivals of Tamil Hindus are from Sri Lanka, and most came as refugees.

== History ==
The history of Hinduism in Réunion stretches back to the mid and late nineteenth century. Many early Indian arrivals took on Christian names and had their children baptised in the Catholic Church at the insistence of their employers or the government administration, but in practice, they did not abandon Hinduism. Christian missionaries argued that the custom of lighting camphor before the Hindu God was an illustration of black magic, whereas lighting candle in the Church was a sure way to salvation.

With the exception of the Muslims who came to the island from Gujarat, all Indians were routinely reassigned as Catholics, often by coercive force. Most of the conversions to Christianity took place during the period of indenture.

== Hinduism today ==
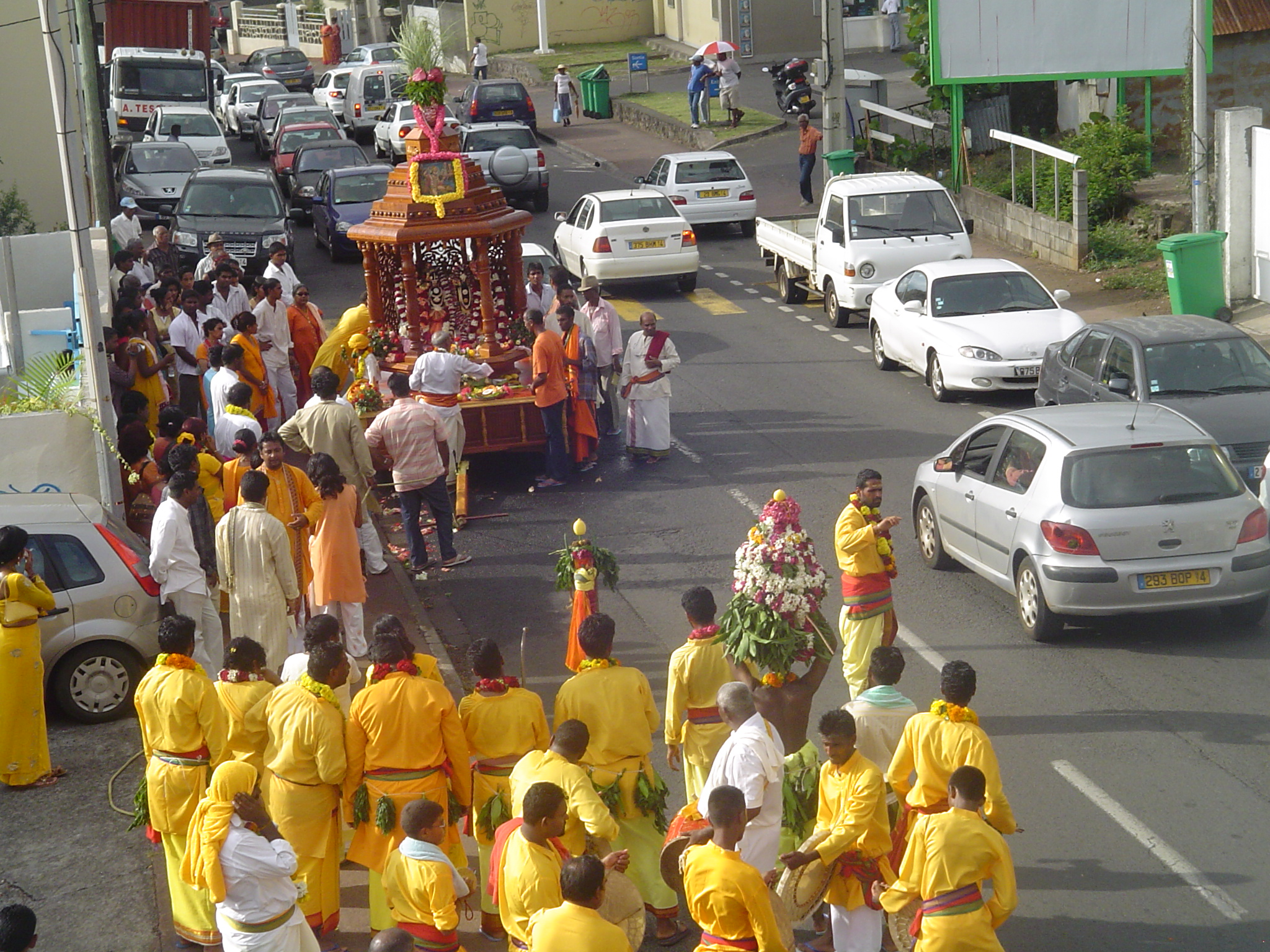
Tamil Hindus in Réunion

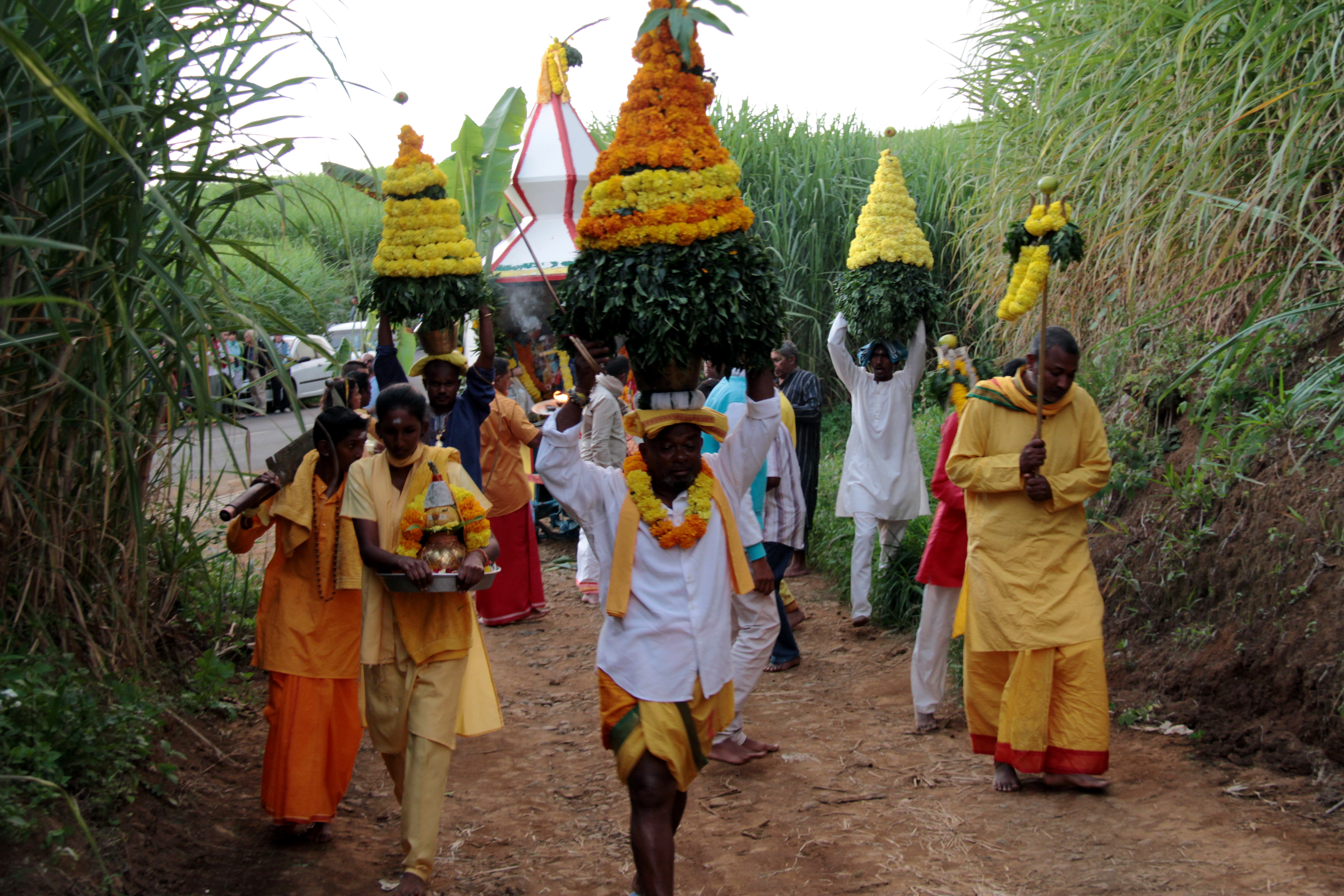
Hindu rite in Reunion.

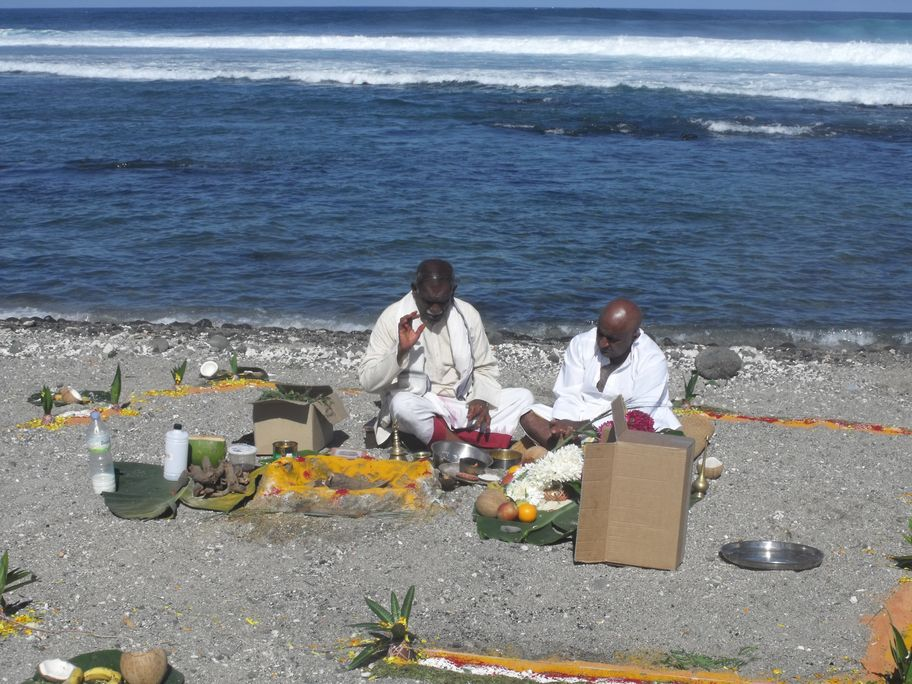
Hindu ceremony on the beach at Saint-Pierre.

In recent years, there has been a revival of Hinduism among members of the Tamil community. This has led to the establishment of many temples and ashrams. Some Gurukkals (Temple priests) were also brought from Tamil Nadu as a part of this. Dr Kalai Selvam Shanmugam, President of the Tamil Sangham in Reunion spoke at the Chennai Centre for Global Studies in 2018, stating that some Temple priests brought from Tamil Nadu had been more interested in making money than in spreading the gospels of Hinduism.

There is a phenomenon of simultaneous observance of both Catholic and Hindu religions by some ethnic Indians, that earned them the stereotype of being "public Catholic and privately Hindu." During the period of indentured servitude, most Indian Hindus were coercively reassigned as Catholics, but practiced their original religion in private.

The French government does not gather statistics on religious affiliation, making it impossible to know accurately how many Hindus there are in Réunion. Most of the large towns have a functioning Hindu temple.

== See also ==
- Hinduism by country
- Hinduism in South Africa
- Hinduism in France
