= Hinduism in Yemen =

Hindus in Yemen
Total population
- 208.780 (2020)▲; 0.7% of total population

Regions with significant populations
- All Over Yemen

Religions
- Hinduism

Related ethnic groups
- Indians in Yemen and Hindus

Hinduism was introduced to Yemen by immigrant Indian and Nepalese workers. Hinduism in Yemen largely goes under the radar, and is only practiced by small congregations scattered around the country. An estimated 150,000 Hindus resided in Yemen in 2010. The Hindu community is largely concentrated in Aden, Mukalla, Shihr, Lahaj, Mokha, and Hudaydah. Many members of the Indian-origin community have resided in the country for generations and hold Yemeni citizenship. That number increased to 202,700 (or 0.7% of the population) in 2020.

== Temples ==
The famous Hindu temples in Yemen include the Shri Tarichmerga Temple that was built in 1862. Shri Ram Ji Temple built in 1875 and the Hanuman Temple built in 1882, according to an IANS report in 2013. The Indian Association in Aden manages the Mataji Temple and regular services are held once a month. There is also a separate crematorium in Aden for the members of the Hindu faith.

== Demographics ==
Historical Population
Year	Pop.	±%
2001	125,429	—
2010	150,000	+19.6%
2015	185,485	+23.7%
2020	202,700	+9.3%

Year	Percent	Increase
2001	0.7%	-
2010	0.6%	-0.1
2015	0.7%	+0.1
2020	0.7%	-

The Pew Research data reports that the Hindu population is expected to increase from 0.7% in 2020 to 0.8% by 2050.

Future Hindu population of Yemen
Year	Total Population	Hindu population	Percentage
2020	29,825,968	208,782	0.7%
2050	48,080,011	380,300	0.8%

== See also ==
- Hinduism in Arab states
- Religion in Yemen
