= Colombia–India relations =

- Colombia: India

Envoy
- Colombian Ambassador to India Victor Hugo Echeverri Jaramillo: Indian Ambassador to Colombia Vanlalhuma

Colombia–India relations are the diplomatic relations between the Republic of Colombia and the Republic of India. Both countries established diplomatic ties on January 19, 1960. Colombia is currently the commercial point of entry into Latin America for Indian companies.

== History ==
Official diplomatic relations between India and Colombia were established on January 19, 1959. On July 14, 1970 Colombia and India signed a commercial accord but this did not develop due to the economic restrictions on foreign goods both countries had and geopolitical differences. It was until March 1972 when Colombia opened an embassy in New Delhi, India. The following year India established an embassy in Bogotá in 1973. The embassy in Bogota was opened until 1993, but later reopened in 1994. The Colombian embassy in India also oversees diplomatic relations with Nepal, Sri Lanka and Bangladesh, as well as providing consular assistance to Colombians situated in those countries.

== Commercial ties ==
Economic and mutual cooperation ties improved with the visit of Colombian President Andrés Pastrana Arango's to India from March 4–7, 2001. Because Colombia and India had similar economies and these similarities are used to establish cooperation between the two countries.

In 2006, Oil and Natural Gas Corporation invested US$437.5 million in oil production in Colombia. The company plans to participate in contract adjudications with the intention of exploring the Colombian land for gas.

On August 23, 2007 the Colombian government reported that trade between Colombia and India was increasing. India gained from the exports to Colombia some US$346 million while Colombia exported to India some US$62 million.

=== Main cooperation areas ===
- Use of solar energy in country border areas.
- Technical cooperation agreements.
- Development of scholarships including in military areas.
- Functioning of the Joint Task Force of the understanding of technologies memorandum.

== See also ==
- Foreign relations of Colombia
- Foreign relations of India
- Non-Aligned Movement
- Hinduism in Colombia
