= Hinduism in Cuba =

Hinduism is a minority religion in Cuba. Hinduism is followed by 0.2% of the population of Cuba. ISKCON also has a presence in the country.

== Demographics ==
Historical Population
Year	Pop.	±%
2007	23,927	—

Year	Percent	Increase
2007	0.2%	-

In 2007, Cuba had about 23,927 Hindus.
