= Hinduism in Ukraine =

Ukrainian Hindus

Total population
- 44,000 (2018); 0 1% of its total population

Religions
- Hinduism; Majority: Shaivism; Minority: Slavic Vedism and Vaishnavism

Languages
- Sanskrit (sacred); Ukrainian

Hinduism is a minority religion in Ukraine. It is followed by 0.1% of the population (around 44,000), with a slightly higher proportion in Western Ukraine (0.2%).

== Demographics ==
According to the 2016 survey by Razumkov Centre, Hindu believers constituted 0.2% of the population of Ukraine, with a slightly higher proportion in Donbas (0.6%) and eastern Ukraine (0.3%). The percentage of Hindus decreased by 0.1% according to the 2018 survey by Razumkov Centre, with a slightly higher proportion in Western Ukraine (0.2%) and less than 0.1% in other regions.

== ISKCON in Ukraine ==
=== History of ISKCON in Ukraine ===
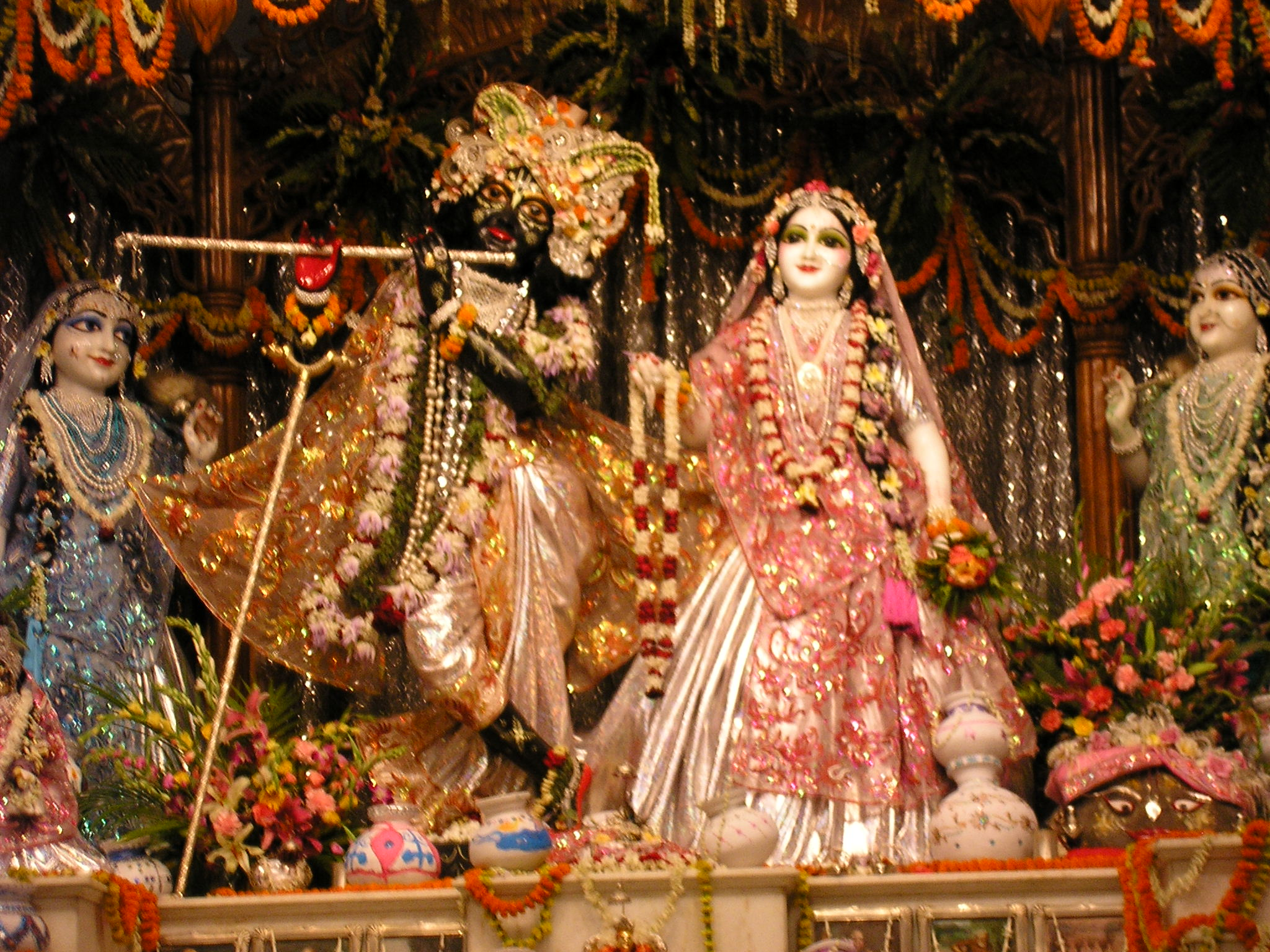
Deities of Radha-Krishna

- Hare Krishna devotees work for ISKCON in every party of Ukraine.
- In 1988, Soviet Hare Krishnas protested persecutions.
- ISKCON started legally printing books 1990. First Ukrainian-language books were translated by Vyasadeva Dasa and Jambavati Dasi in 1990-1991.
- In 1991—first legal harinamas were held in central Kyiv. Odesa Festival was organized which attracted about 1,500 devotees.

=== ISKCON now ===
As of 1 January 2006, twenty-nine Krishna Consciousness communities were registered. IRF 2006

It has over 30 charitable missions (e.g., “Food for Life”) and has begun the construction of a school. ISKCON has 60 teaching centres and 15 God Krishna temples. It is estimated that ISKCON in Ukraine has 450 students, 8,000 active adherents, more than 300 clergy, and nearly 40,000 adherents.

== Yoga in Ukraine ==
Yoga is gaining popularity in Ukraine.

Sahaja Yoga, Vasudeva Yoga Association of Ukraine and Ashtanga Yoga Club of Ukraine are some Organisations in Ukraine teaching Yoga.

Sahaja Yoga is a method of meditation which seeks to bring a breakthrough in the evolution of human awareness. It was created by Shri Mataji Nirmala Devi in 1970.

International Federation of Yoga CAS (Vajra Yoga) is present in Kyiv as well. It is mainly focused on the correct approach to the spine in asanas. There are classes for both beginners and advanced yoga students. Some Vajra Yoga teachers give courses in English. Its two main studios, Vajra and India Club, are located in the city center. The timetable of the classes can be found on its website (in Russian/Ukrainian).

Yoga in Daily Life has a Centre in Ukraine. Address- Society Yoga in daily life Cherkassy Ukraine, Smelyanskaya str, 80-60, Cherkassy

Ukrainian Federation of Yoga, the biggest Hatha yoga school has branches almost in all major centers including Kyiv, Kharkiv and Lviv
