= Hinduism in Turkey =

Hinduism is a minority religion in Turkey. It has been studied in Turkish universities since the 1930s and a number of Hindu or Hindu-related groups and practices are popular in Turkey. As of 2024, there are 843 Hindus in Turkey, making up less than 0.01% of the country's population.

== History ==
According to the writings of Zenobius Glak, two Indian princes and their families fled to Armenia from Ujjain in 149 BC. They were granted a grand welcome and given land there. They built a temple for Hindu gods and goddesses in Ashtishat.

In 1936, Ankara University became the first Turkish university to have an Indology department. It was founded by Professor W. Ruben, a German Indologist, who led the department until the late 1940s. Professor Abidin Itil, a specialist in Hindi literature and culture, was the head of the department from the late 1940s until 1975.

There are a number of well-known Hindu or Hindu-related groups and practices in Turkey including Sahaja Yoga and Transcendental Meditation, which have been popularised with the help of university and hotel clubs. Maharishi Mahesh, creator of Transcendental Meditation, visited Turkey thrice in the 1960s. The first Transcendental Meditation centre in Turkey opened in 1966 and, as of 2020, there are 19 branches located across the country. As of 2018, there are 57 Sahaja Yoga Centres in Turkey.

== Demographics ==
In 2001, 300 Hindus resided in Turkey. The number reached 728 by 2010, an increase of 143 percent, and 843 by 2020. As of 2024, there are 843 Hindus in Turkey, making up less than 0.01% of the country's population.

Historical Population
Year	Pop.	±%
2001	300	—
2010	728	+142.7%
2020	843	+15.8%
2024	843	+0.0%

Year	Percent	Increase
2001	0.0005%	-
2010	0.001%	▲ +0.0005%
2020	0.001%	-
