= Hinduism in Somalia =

Hinduism is a minority religion in Somalia. It is the third largest religion in the country after Islam and Indigenous religions. As of 2015, there were 8,278 (0.06%) Hindus in the country.

== Demographics ==
Historical Population
Year	Pop.	±%
2015	8,278	—

Year	Percent	Increase
2015	0.06%	-

According to ARDA, there were 8,278 (0.06%) Hindus in Somalia in the year 2015.

Pew Research projects the Hindu population in Somalia to increase to 11,036 by 2040, although percentage wise it would reduce to 0.04%.

Future Hindu population of Somalia
Year	Total Population	Hindu population	Percentage
2015	13,797,204	8,278	0.06%
2040	27,590,986	11,036	0.04%
