= Hinduism in Slovakia =

Hinduism has a small following in Slovakia. As of 2021, there are about 975 (0.12%) Hindus in Slovakia. Hindu groups such as Hare Krishna, Sahaja Yoga, and the Chinmaya mission operate in Slovakia.

== Recognition ==
No Hindu groups are officially registered in the Slovak Republic. Registration of religious groups is not legally required, though only registered religious groups have the explicit right to conduct public worship services and other activities, although no specific religions or practices are banned or discouraged by the authorities in practice.

In 2017, the Slovakia government passed a new religion law requiring religious groups seeking government recognition to provide evidence of having 50,000 adult members, an increase from the previous requirement of 20,000 members that had been in place since 2007. Hindu statesman Rajan Zed, President of the Universal Society of Hinduism, urged Slovak President Andrej Kiska to veto the law, and asked for the intervention of the European Commission and Council of Europe Commissioner for Human Rights Nils Muižnieks.

== Demographics ==
Historical Population
Year	Pop.	±%
2001	58	—
2011	255	+339.7%
2021	975	+282.4%
Source: Takáč, Adam. "Sčítanie obyvateľstva v roku 2021". Statistical Office of the Slovak Republic.

Year	Percent	Increase
2001	0.005%	-
2011	0.01%	+0.005%
2021	0.02%	+0.01%
