= Hinduism in Guadeloupe =

Hinduism is a minority religion in Guadeloupe, followed by some Indo-Guadeloupeans. According to a statistics data, Hinduism is practised by 0.5% of the people in Guadeloupe.

== Temples ==
There are a sizeable number of Hindu Tamil temples that are located in Basse-Terre, and other regions. The oldest Hindu temple is in dravidian style in Changy in Basse Terre and another one in Gaschet in Grande-Terre.

== Demographics ==
Although the Indo-Guadeloupeans constitute about 14% of the Guadeloupe, only some of them are still Hindus. Most of the Indo-Guadelopeans are Catholics, but they also worship Hindu gods. Ernest Moutoussamy, first Indo-Guadelopean member of the French Parliament said,

Though we are Catholics, we still have images of Hindu gods at home. We celebrate all the Christian festivals but we don’t celebrate Deepavali. I am an Indian but then Guadeloupe is home to me.

— Ernest Moutoussamy, Speech in India 2006

== Revival ==
Revival of Hinduism happened in the last few decades. Many associations for the promotion of Hinduism and Indian culture have appeared during the 90's. The Institut du Monde Indien (Institute for the study of the Indian world) was begun by Jacques Sidambarom, Jean-Claude Petapermal and Roland Gopy to resuscitate Hindu rituals and connect Hindus in Trinidad and Tobago, Reunion, Pondicherry and Paris. A weekly radio show has also been established which hosts discussions on Hindu culture and plays Indian music.

Shiva, Brahma, and Vishnou are commonly worshipped Gods in Guadeloupe. Hindu Goddess Marayamman, who is famous in Tamil Nadu is worshipped by her french name Maliémin. Goddess Kâli is associated with healing power and protecting children from evil. Maldévilin is a leading male deity and considered to be a protector of the Maliémin temple. Temples were also constructed as a part of it. Hindu religious rituals were also reactivated. Hindu festivals like Diwali and Pongal were also started celebrating.

== See also ==
- Hinduism in Martinique
- Hinduism in Réunion
- Hinduism in France
