= Hinduism in Tanzania =

Religious group in Tanzania

The "Om" symbol in Devanagari

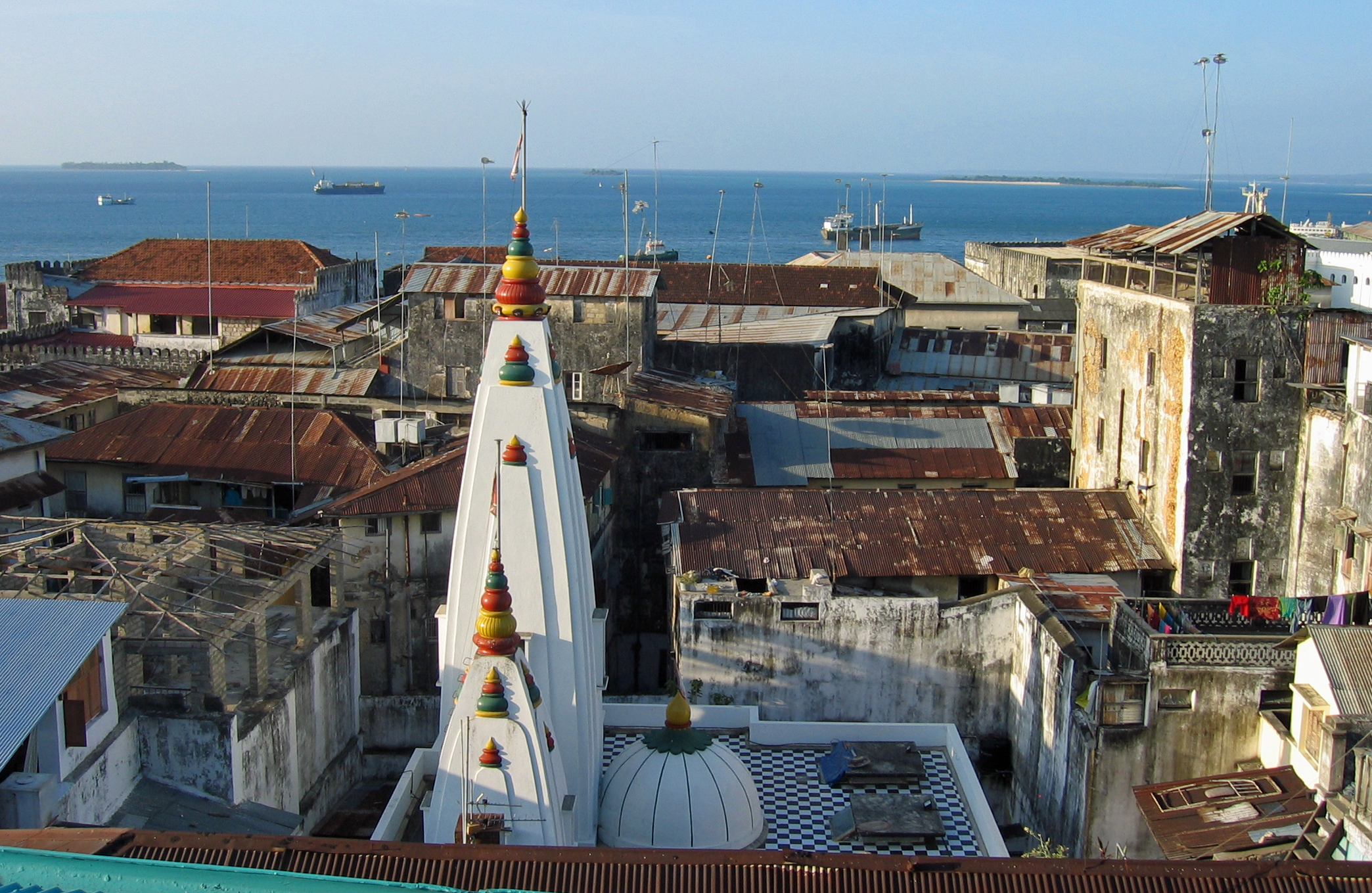
Shakti Temple in Stone Town

The earliest evidence of Hinduism in Tanzania is from the 1st millennium AD when there was trade between East Africa and Indian subcontinent. Most of these traders came from Gujarat, Deccan (now Maharashtra) and the Chola empire. Archaeological evidence of small Hindu settlements have been found in Zanzibar and parts of Swahili coast, Zimbabwe and Madagascar.

Pew Research Center estimates there were about 40,000 to 60,000 Hindus in Tanzania in 2010.

== History ==
A mention of ancient trade between Hindus of India and Africa is from the time of Nabonidus, when Babylon was one of the hubs of global trade. In ancient times, the Hindus would trade, never interfere in political system and return to India. Small settlements of Hindus began in 1st century AD, mostly on islands east of Africa, along its coast and in few cases inland. Ancient Indian texts refer to Wanyamwezi, or "the men of the moon" - a term still in use to identify the Nyamwezi people in Tanzania. Every major explorer who visited eastern side of Africa has mentioned the presence of Hindu traders and merchants, in Zanzibar, Kilwa, Mombasa, Malindi and Mozambique. Vasco da Gama won over and convinced one such Africa-settled Gujarati Hindu to help pilot his maiden voyage from Africa to India. This affinity and regular trade was helped by steady trade winds that flow from east Africa to Indian peninsula for part of the year, while reverse and flow from Indian peninsula to east Africa for another part of the year.

The Hindus were known to be vegetarians and non-violent, never imposing their religion or culture in Africa. They prospered by offering a good trade, quality products and cash loans to the Zanzibar and other African community, but have traditionally kept their religion, social and cultural life as a private, personal matter. The first major change came to Tanzania with the arrival of Shia Islam (Ismaili), when Muslims and Omani Arabs began to compete with Indian Hindus, and when Muslims began a campaign of conversion. The second major change came in the 16th century with the arrival of colonial empires and Christianity.

During the colonial era, after European officials, Hindus were the most economically successful ethnic group in Tanzania, but they remained politically and legally insecure as a minority. When British colonial era ended, Indian Hindus became a targeted, persecuted group and many emigrated from Tanzania to Europe and India.

== Hinduism in modern Tanzania ==
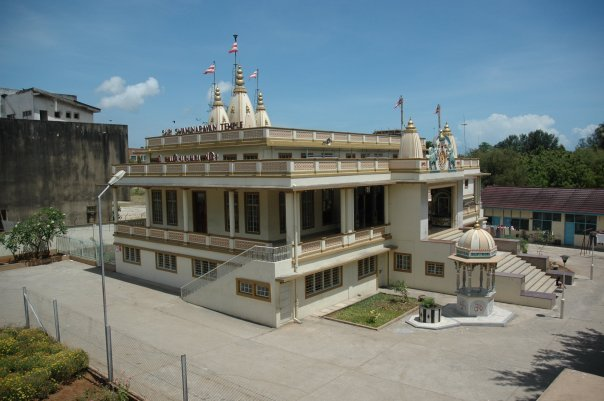
Shree Swaminarayan Temple, Morogoro Road, Dar es Salaam

Hinduism is a minority religion in Tanzania. According to Pew Research Center estimates, Hindus made up less than 0.1% of the population in 2020, down from about 0.1% in 2010.

Most adherents are of Indian, particularly Gujarati, descent. Among the various traditions within Hinduism, Swaminarayan from Gujarat is an active bhakti school of Hinduism in Tanzania and Kenya. It was well established by 1950, because of its social, cultural and temple building initiatives in East Africa. Hindu temples have been established in Dar-es-Salaam, most of them located at the City Centre, the street name where the Hindu temples are located has been renamed to Pramukh Swami street. Swaminarayan temples have also been built in cities other than Dar-es-Salaam, such as Zanzibar, Arusha and Moshi. Other Hindu schools with presence in Tanzania include Yoga and Vedanta, as well as followers of Brahma Kumari, Satya Sai Baba and Hare Krishna movement.

== List of Hindu temples in Tanzania ==
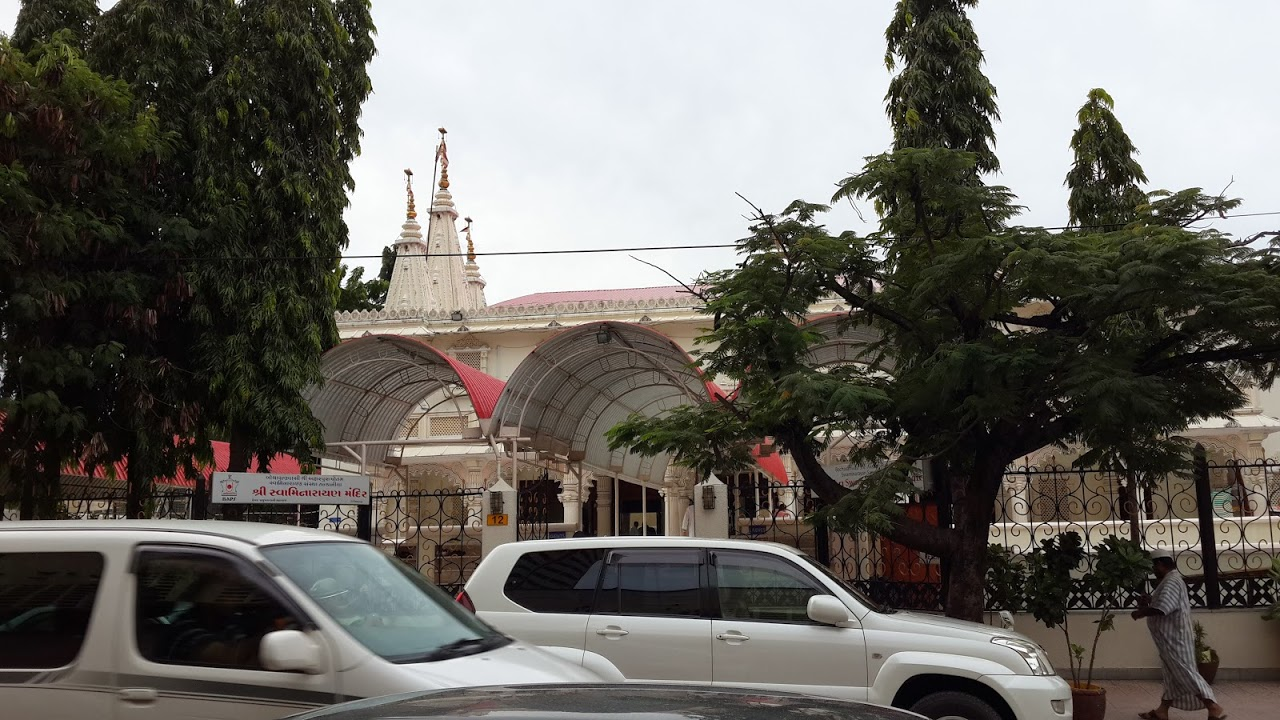
BAPS Shri Swaminarayan Mandir, Pramukh Swami street, Dar es Salaam

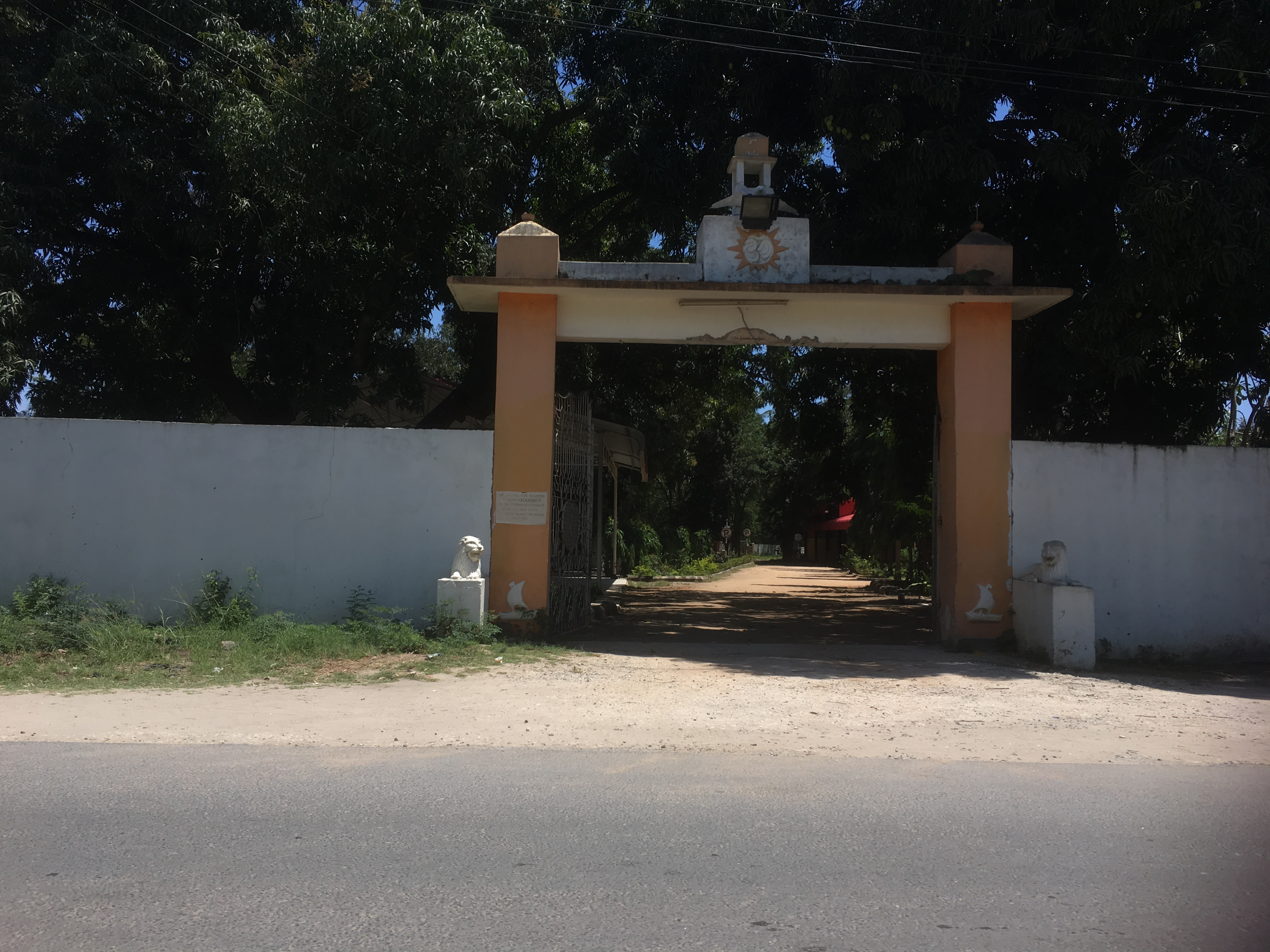
Crematorium in Dar es Salaam.

Tanzania has Hindu temples in several cities and a Hindu council to help organize social and cultural activities.

- BAPS Shri Swaminarayan Mandir, Arusha
- Iskcon Arusha Centre, Arusha
- Hindu Temple, Barongo road, Bukoba
- Shri Swaminarayan Mandir, Morogoro road, Dar es Salaam
- BAPS Shri Swaminarayan Mandir, Pramukh Swami street, Dar es Salaam
- Shri Sanatan Dharma Sabha temple, Pramukh Swami street, Dar es Salaam
- Shri Shankarashram temple, Pramukh Swami street, Dar es Salaam
- Iskcon Dar es Salaam Centre, Mosque street, Dar es Salaam
- Hindu Temple, Kilima Street, Moshi
- Hindu Mandal Temple, Station Street, Morogoro
- Shri Sanatan Dharma Mandir, Mwanza
- BAPS Shri Swaminarayan Mandir, Mwanza
- Shakti Temple, Zanzibar
