= Hinduism in Uganda =

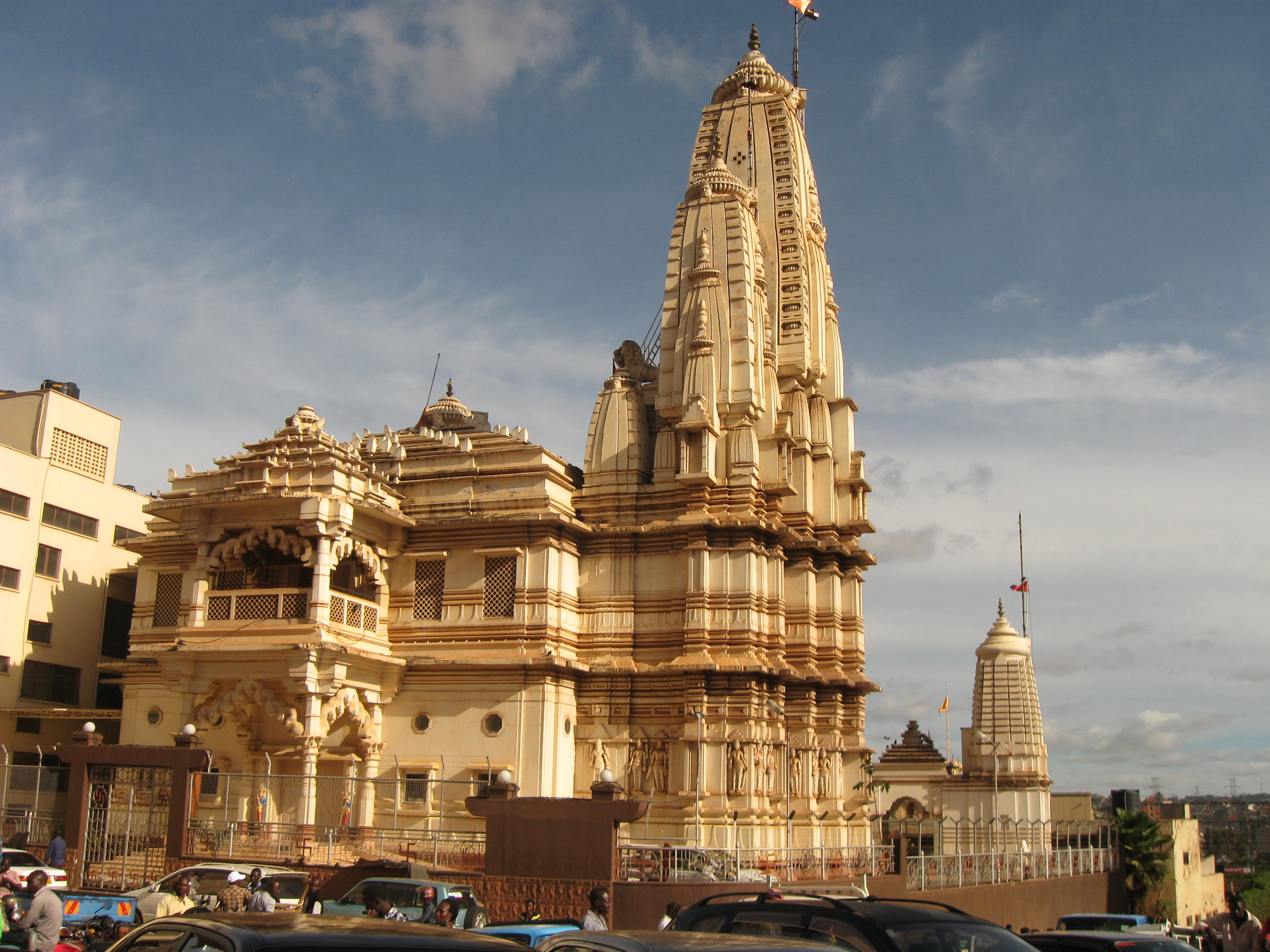
- Shree Sanatan Dharma Mandal temple in Kampala

Total population
- 355,497 (2020)▲; 0.8%–0.9% of total population

Regions with significant populations
- All Over Uganda

Religions
- Hinduism

Related ethnic groups
- Indians in Uganda and Hindus

Uganda

Hinduism in Uganda arrived when the colonial British Empire brought Hindus along with other Indian workers to its East African colonies in late 19th and early 20th centuries. The largest arrival of Hindu immigrants to Uganda, some educated and skilled but mostly poor and struggling from the famine-prone areas of Punjab and Gujarat, was to help construct the Kenya-Uganda Railway connecting landlocked parts of Uganda and Kenya with the port city of Mombasa. The largest departure of Hindus from Uganda occurred when General Idi Amin expelled them and seized their properties in 1972.

In addition to building major infrastructure projects, Hindus were a part of a global movement of workers to parts of British East Africa, aimed at helping the British government to establish services, retail markets and administrative support. The British invited Indian laborers as local skilled labor was unavailable. At the peak of the infrastructure projects in Uganda-Kenya, 32,000 people were brought in from India. Nearly 2,500 workers died because of difficult and unsafe working conditions during these projects. After the project ended, nearly 70% of the workers returned to India, while some 6,000 were absorbed in railway and other British operations such as retail and administration. Those who remained included Hindus, Muslims, Jains and Sikhs. Many from this ethnic group became financially successful.

== Demographics ==
According to ARDA, there were about 355,497 (0.93%) Hindus in Uganda in 2015 In 2020, ARDA figures showed that Hindus made up 0.8% of the population.

Year	Percent	Increase
1970	0.69%	–
2015	0.93%	+0.24%

== Expulsion of Hindus and other Asians by Idi Amin ==
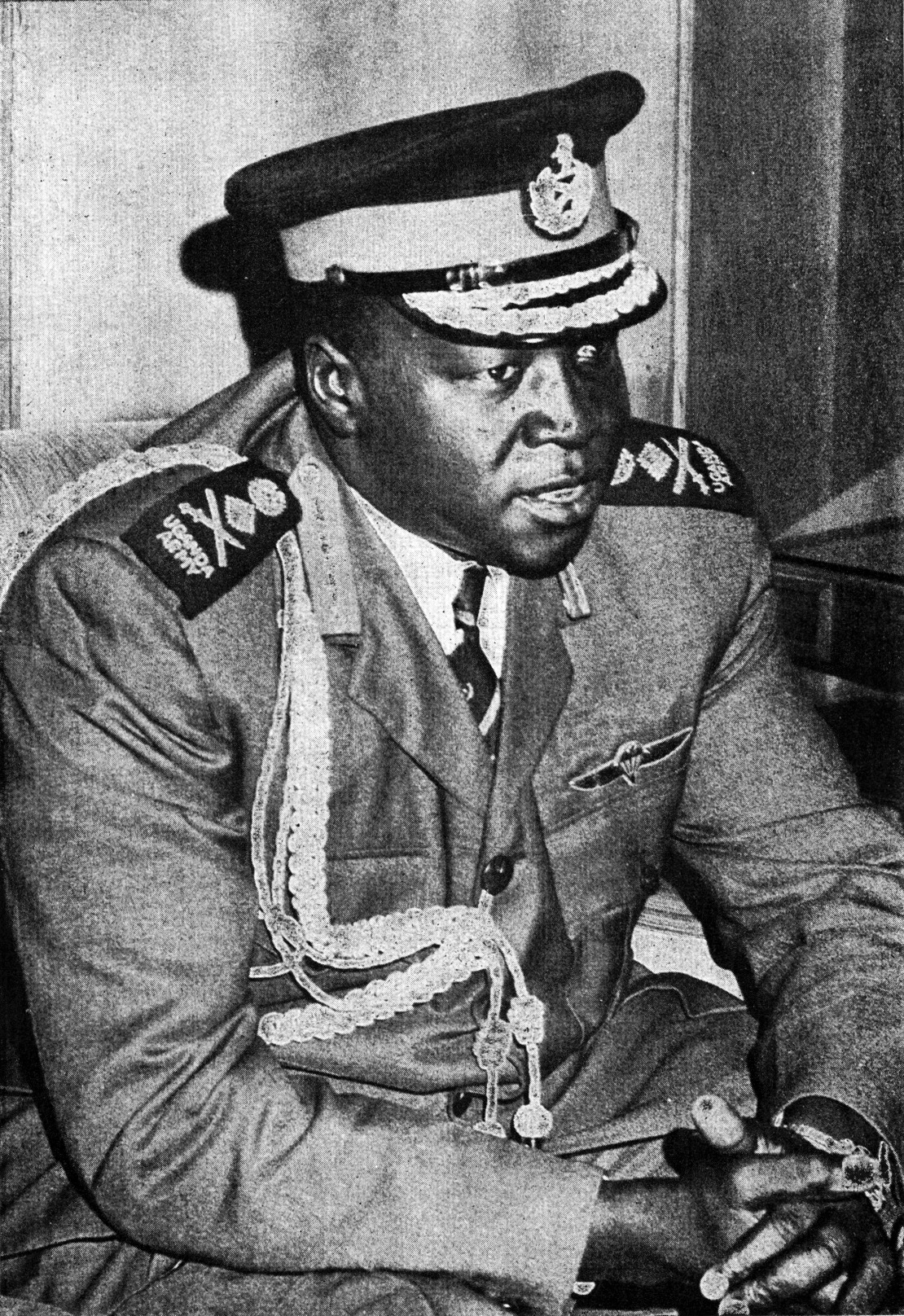
General Idi Amin expelled all Hindus and other Asians in 1972 from Uganda. Twenty years later, Uganda reversed that law.

Historical Population
Year	Pop.	±%
1970	65,000	—
2015	355,497	+446.9%

After colonialism ended, Hindus (along with Jains and Sikhs) were discriminated against in East Africa including Uganda. This was a part of the policies of various East African governments in their promotion of Africanization based on laws and policies under which commercial and professional sectors of the economy had to be owned by indigenous Africans. The Hindus, along with Jains, Sikhs, Jews and other religious groups, were affected during this period of xenophobic targeting of Asians and Europeans by African leaders.

When General Idi Amin came to power by overthrowing an elected government in Uganda, he adopted a policy of religious and ethnic cleansing against people of Asian religions. Himself a Muslim, he announced that he had a dream, where "Allah told him that the Asians, exploiters who did not want to integrate with the Africans, had to go". In 1972, he selectively expelled the Hindus along with other Asians from Uganda, and seized their properties. Most of those expelled were second or third generation Hindus, many with dual Ugandan and British citizenship. While he expelled Hindus and people of other religions with origins in India, Idi Amin did not expel Christians of British or French origins living in Uganda.

According to Kim Knott, professor of Religious and Secular Studies at Lancaster University, there were 65,000 Hindus in Uganda in 1970, but all were expelled by Idi Amin. The expelled Hindus mass migrated to other countries during this period, particularly the United Kingdom (28,000 refugees (Note: These numbers are total, and include non-Hindus from Asia who were expelled, such as Sikhs.)), India (15,000 refugees), Canada (8,000 refugees), the United States (1,500 refugees) and in smaller numbers to other countries such as Australia. The expulsion removed most of Uganda's "industrialists, traders, artisans and civil servants", states Christopher Senyonjo, and their properties were re-allocated to civilians and Ugandan Army officials who supported Idi Amin. Uganda faced a shortage of skilled professionals such as doctors, bankers, nurses and teachers. It triggered a financial crisis and a collapse of businesses, including cement and sugar production, causing long-term economic devastation in Uganda.

== Post-Idi Amin conditions ==
Twenty years after the Idi Amin expulsion, Uganda reversed its laws selectively targeting Hindus and other Indian religions. This policy, offered in cooperation with the World Bank, included a return of properties seized by Idi Amin's government, such as empty and unused factories, back to the families if they returned and recreated employment.

Hindus are a tiny minority in the total Ugandan population of about 27 million. The official demographics lists Christians and Muslims separately, but includes Hindus, Jains, Sikhs, Buddhists and traditional African religions as others. Approximately 65% of the South Asians living in Uganda are Hindus. There is a Swaminarayan temple in Kampala.
