= Hinduism in South Asia =

Hindus of South Asia

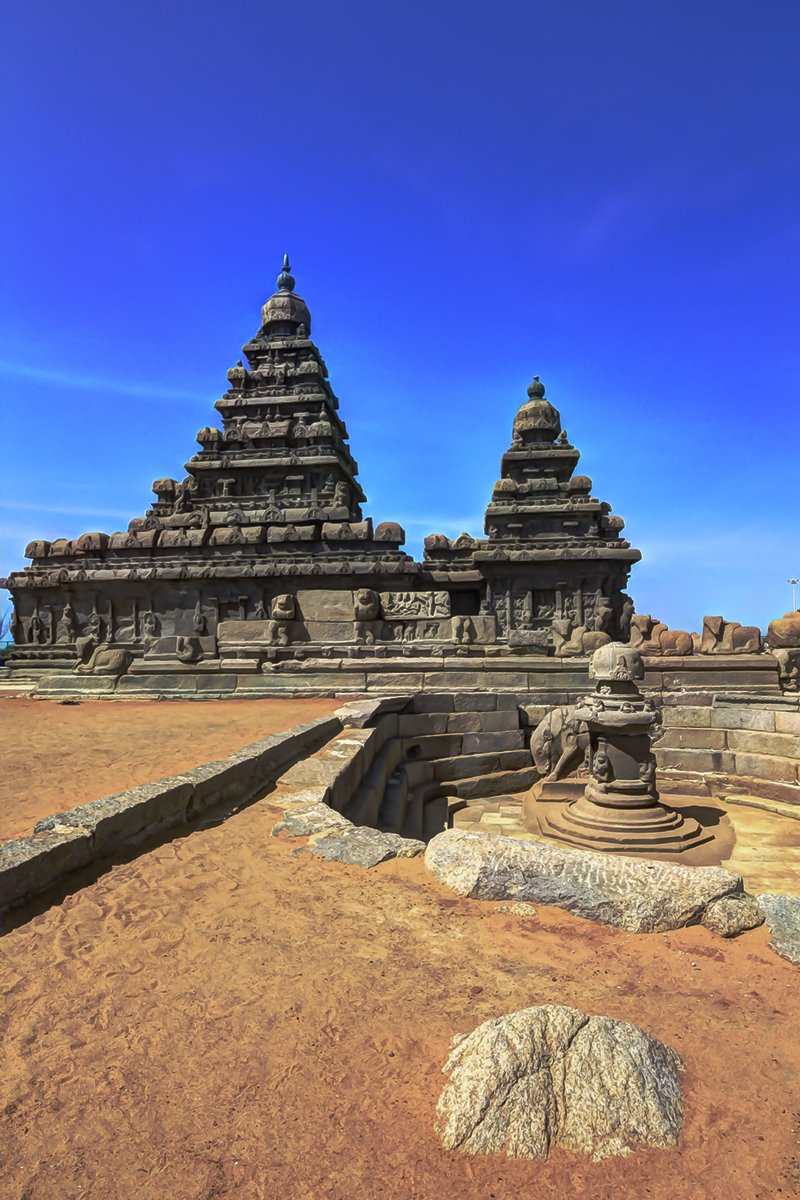
- The Hindu Shore Temple at Mahabalipuram was built by Narasimhavarman II.

Total population
- c. 1.17 billion (60.9% of the total South Asian population) (Note: 2024 national population estimates by the World Factbook result in a South Asian population of 1,924,300,144.)

Regions with significant populations
- India: 1,124,484,380 (2024) (Note: Hindus comprise 79.8% (1,124,484,380) of India's total population of 1,409,128,296 per 2024 estimate by the World Factbook.)
- Nepal: 25,271,378 (2024) (Note: Hindus comprise 81.2% (25,271,378) of Nepal's total population of 31,122,387 per 2024 estimate by the World Factbook.)
- Bangladesh: 13,495,775 (2024) (Note: Hindus comprise 8% (13,495,775) of Bangladesh's total population of 168,697,184 per 2024 estimate by the World Factbook.)
- Pakistan: 5,476,289 (2024) (Note: Hindus comprise 2.17% (5,476,289) of Pakistan's total population of 252,363,571. Hindu percentage is derived from the 2023 Pakistani census while the total population is a 2024 estimate by the World Factbook.)
- Sri Lanka: 2,769,809 (2024) (Note: Hindus comprise 12.6% (2,769,809) of Sri Lanka's total population of 21,982,608 per 2024 estimate by the World Factbook.)
- Bhutan: 195,485 (2024) (Note: Hindus comprise 22.1% (191,778) of Bhutan's total population of 884,546 per 2024 estimate by the World Factbook.)
- (Islamic Republic of Afghanistan) Afghanistan: 50 (2021)

Religions
- Hinduism; Tribal religions (including Sarnaism, Nanakpanthi, Kalasha and others) (minority)

Scriptures
- Bhagavad Gita and Vedas also see other Hindu texts

Languages
- Predominant spoken language Hindi; Recognized regional languages: Bengali; Marathi; Telugu; Tamil; Gujarati; Kannada; Odia; Malayalam; Nepali; Punjabi; and other Languages of South Asia; Sacred language Sanskrit (Sacred)

Hinduism is the largest religion in South Asia with about 1.2 billion Hindus, forming just under two-thirds of South Asia's population. South Asia has the largest population of Hindus in the world, with about 99% of all global Hindus being from South Asia. Hinduism is the dominant religion in India and Nepal and is the second-largest religion in Bangladesh, Pakistan, Sri Lanka, and Bhutan.

Indo-Aryan migrations brought the Indo-Aryans to South Asia, where they compiled and composed the Vedic corpus during the Vedic period (ca. 1500-500 BCE) across present-day Northern India, Pakistan and Afghanistan. The subsequent period, between 800 BCE and 250 BCE, was "a turning point between the Vedic religion and Hindu religions", and a formative period for Hinduism, Jainism and Buddhism. The Epic and Early Puranic period, from c. 250 BCE and 500 CE, saw the onset of the Hindu synthesis, followed by the classical "Golden Age" of India (c. 350 - 650 CE), which coincides with the Gupta Empire.

Following the conquest of Islamic rulers in the Indian subcontinent and spread of Islam in South Asia, the Hindu-majority population became subject to a predominantly Muslim elite and the former’s status depended on the region and the ruler, e.g. the cultural and religious syncretism at the court of Akbar as compared to the more Islamically orthodox, zealous edicts of Aurangzeb. During the latter period of the Mughal Empire, powerful Hindu polities reemerged, such as the Vijayanagara and Maratha Empire in modern-day India.

== History ==
=== Origins ===
The Vedic period, named after the Vedic religion of the Indo-Aryans, lasted from c. 1900 BCE-500 BCE. The Indo-Aryans were pastoralists who migrated into northwestern India after the collapse of the Indus Valley Civilisation. Linguistic and archaeological data show a cultural change in the subcontinent after 1500 BCE, with the linguistic and religious data clearly showing links with Indo-European languages and religion. By about 1500 BCE, the Vedic culture and agrarian lifestyle were established in the northwest and northern Gangetic plain of South Asia. Rudimentary state-forms appeared, of which the Kuru-Pañcāla union was the most influential. The first recorded state-level society in South Asia existed around 1000 BCE. In this period, states Samuel emerged the Brahmana and Aranyaka layers of Vedic texts, which merged into the earliest Upanishads. These texts began to ask the meaning of a ritual, adding increasing levels of philosophical and metaphysical speculation, or "Hindu synthesis".

=== Rise of Hindu Nationalism ===
In recent years, there has been a rising movement of Hindu nationalism and feeling of Hindutva or Hindu identity among the Hindus of India. This has been observed especially after the formation of the BJP government in India in 2014. In India, several Hindu nationalist political parties exist, out of which the BJP is the biggest among them. Alongside the BJP, the Rashtriya Swayamsevak Sangh (RSS) has also been accused of being a chief organisation in the Hindu nationalist cause.

The rise of Hindu nationalism and Hindutva is seen as a threat to the secular laws of India. It was also seen that the with rise of the Hindu nationalism, there has been an increase in persecutions of religious minorities, mainly Muslims and Christians. The government of Narendra Modi has also been blamed for the increase in violence. Other hardline Hindutva groups, such as the Vishva Hindu Parishad (VHP) and the Bajrang Dal (which are designated as paramilitary groups by many nations such as Australia, Canada and United States) have also contributed a major role to the enhancement of Hindu nationalism and are also blamed for increasing Islamophobia in India and attacks on Christians.

Similarly, Nepal has also experienced the same rise in Hindu nationalism, mainly after 2015 after demonstrators protested for the re-declaration of Hinduism as the state religion of Nepal along with the restoration of the monarchy in the country. Nepal has seen an increase in violence against Christians.

== Temples ==
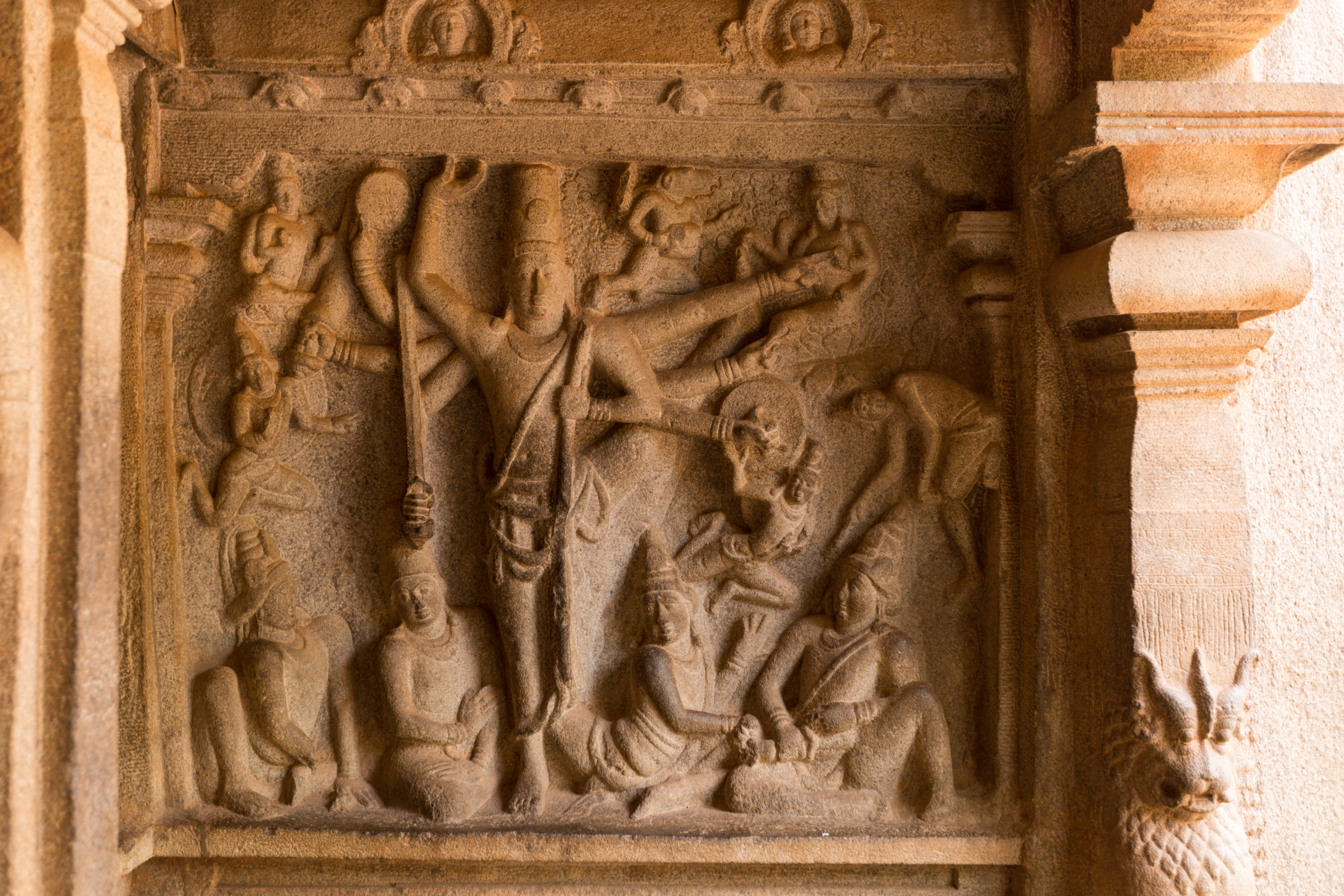
Shore Temple of Mamallapuram (Pallava dynasty, 700–728 CE).

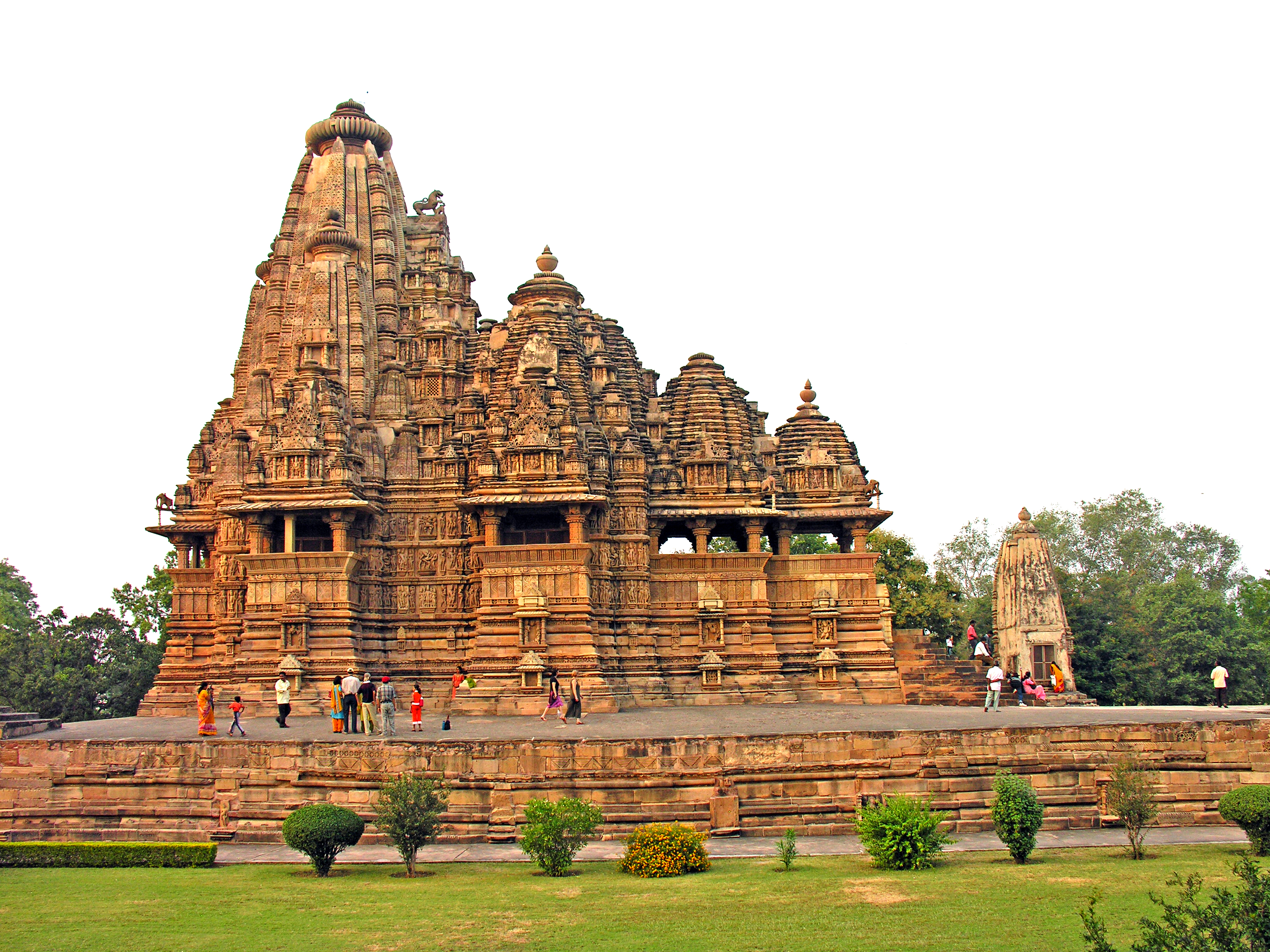
Vishvanatha Temple, part of the Khajuraho group of monuments.

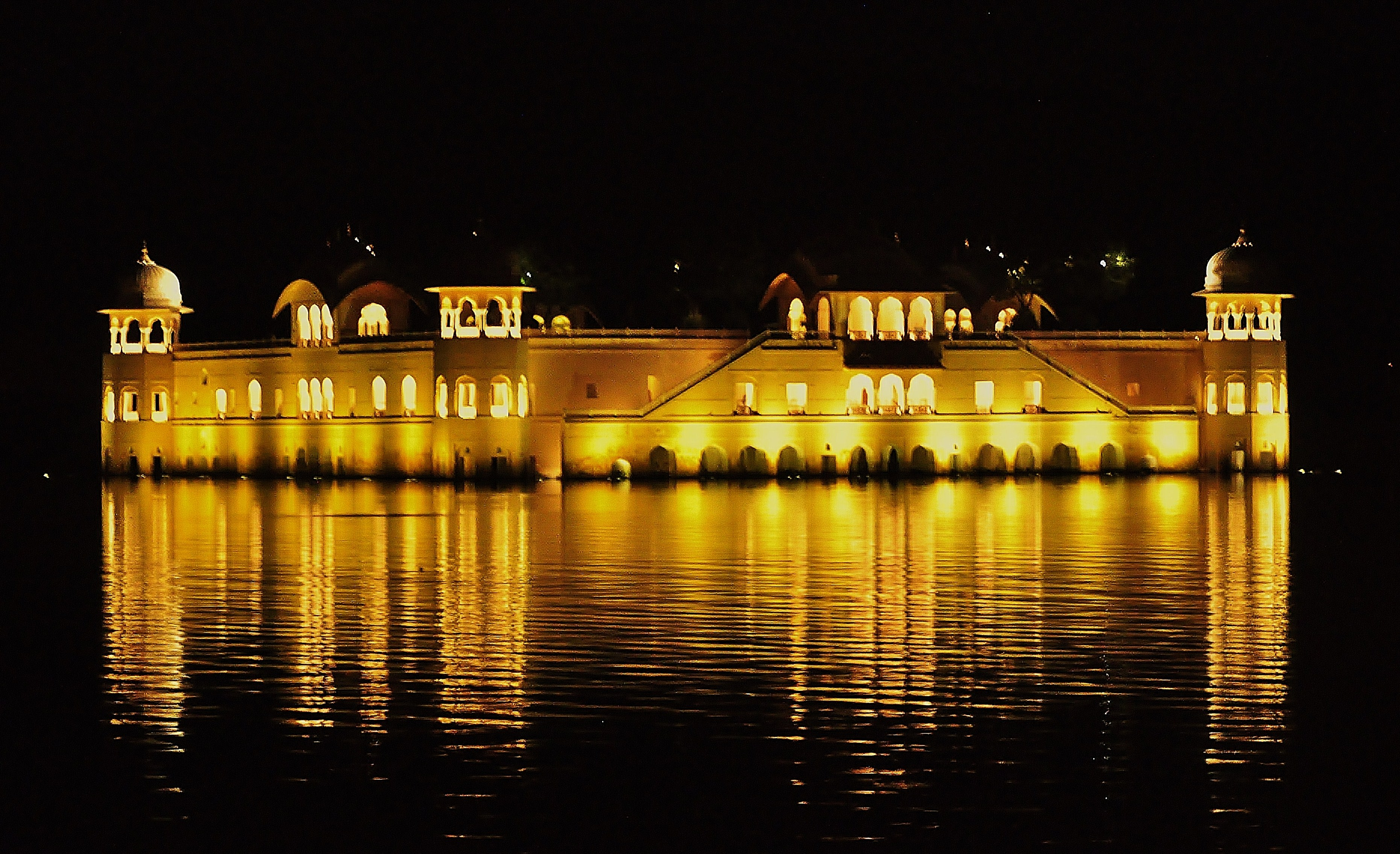
Jal Mahal, one of the masterpiece of Rajput rule in Rajputana.

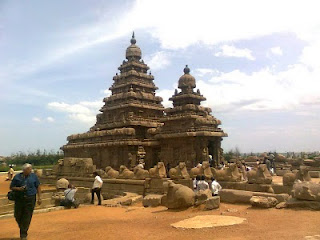
The rock-cut Shore Temple of the temples in Mahabalipuram, Tamil Nadu, 700–728.

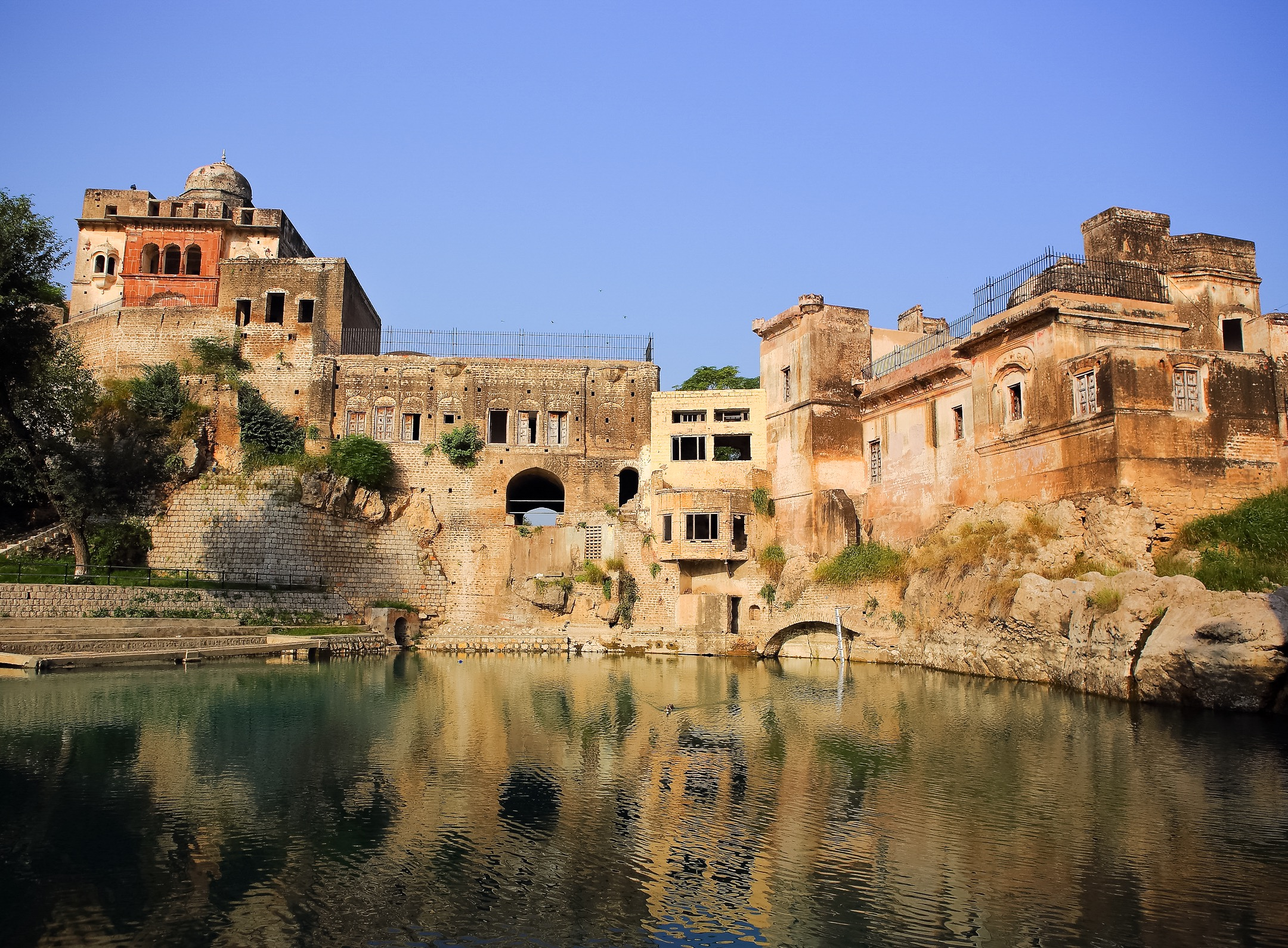
Katas Raj Temples of Pakistan are known to be historical temples to be built in c. 7th century CE.

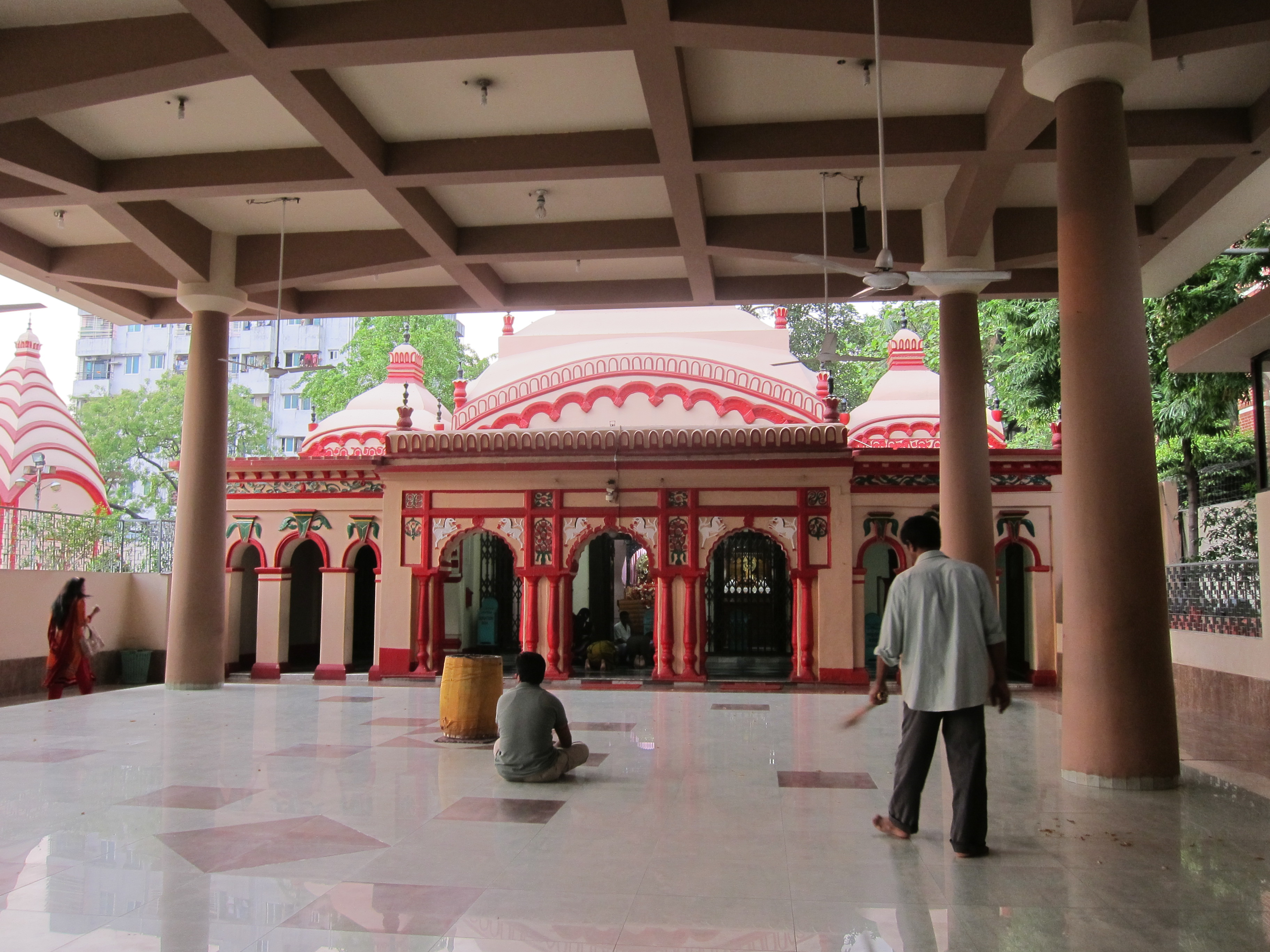
Dhakeshwari Temple in Bangladesh.

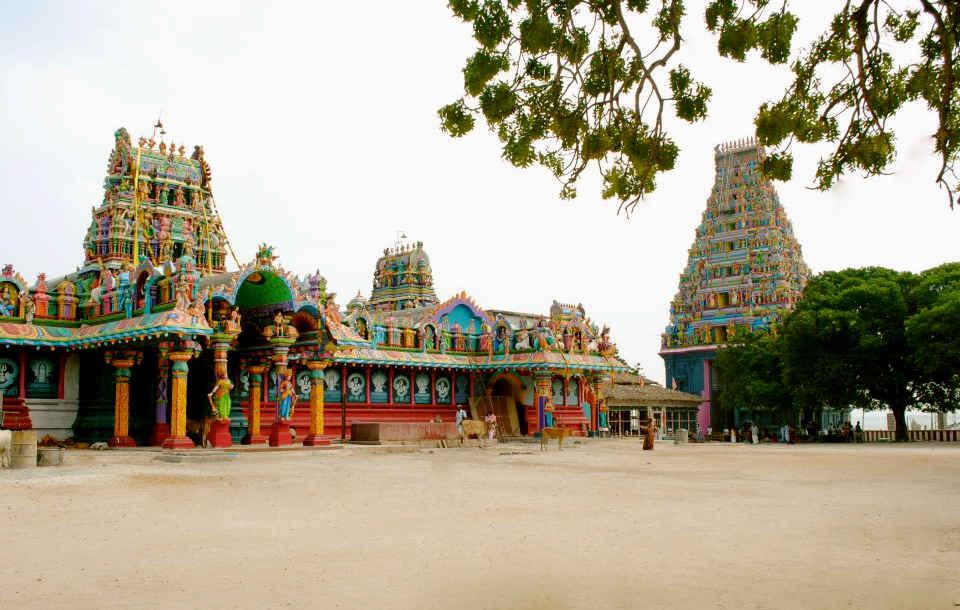
Front entrance of Nainativu Nagapooshani Amman Temple.

== Organisations ==
Most Hindu organisations in South Asia are based in India and Nepal, although there are other organizations based elsewhere in South Asia.

=== Political ===
- Bharatiya Janata Party ( (India) )
- Hindu Mahasabha ( (India) )
- Rastriya Prajatantra Party ( (Nepal) )
- Pakistan Hindu Party

=== Social ===
- Bangabhumi ( (Bangladesh) )
- Hindu Dharma Samudaya ( (Bhutan) )
- Siva Senai ( (Sri Lanka) )
- Hindu Prajatantrik Party ( (Nepal) )

== Demographics ==
Percentage of Hindus by country
Country	Percentage
Nepal	81.34%
India	80%
Bhutan	22.60%
Sri Lanka	12.60%
Bangladesh	7.95%
Pakistan	2.20%
Afghanistan	0.001%
Maldives	0%

Hinduism is the majority religion in South Asia, and most of the world's Hindus are home to the region. 5 of the 10 nations with the biggest Hindu populations are in South Asia, namely India, Nepal, Bangladesh, Pakistan and Sri Lanka. India is home to more than 1.2 billion Hindus, 94% of the world's global Hindu population.

Hinduism is the majority religion in Nepal and India, with 81.34% and 79.8% of the countries' respective populations practicing Hinduism. (Note: Nepal and India are the only sovereign nations in the world that have Hindus as a majority population, where in Nepal Hindus accounts for nearly 81% and India with nearly 79.8%.) Hinduism is the second largest religious group in Bangladesh, Pakistan, Sri Lanka and Bhutan and there is a very minute Hindu minority in Afghanistan. There are also no Hindus in the Maldives, as per its constitution. (Note: Sunni Islam is the state religion of the Maldives and as per the 2008 Constitution, only Sunni Muslims are capable of holding Maldivian citizenship and the government mandates that all citizens practice Sunni Islam, effectively making its population 100% Muslim.)

In recent years, Hindu populations have decreased in non-Hindu majority countries in South Asia, especially Sri Lanka, Afghanistan, Bangladesh and Pakistan. This is due to a number of reasons, such as persecution, forced conversion and low-fertility rates. Civil war in Afghanistan and Sri Lanka have also caused Hindus to flee these countries.

== See also ==
- Hinduism in Asia
  - Hinduism in India
  - Hinduism in Nepal
  - Hinduism in Bangladesh
  - Hinduism in Pakistan
  - Hinduism in Sri Lanka
  - Hinduism in Bhutan
  - Hinduism in Afghanistan
  - Hinduism in the Maldives
