= Freedom of religion in the Maldives =

The 2008 Constitution of Maldives designates Sunni Islam as the state religion. Only Sunni Muslims are allowed to hold citizenship in the country and citizens may practice Sunni Islam only. Non-Muslim citizens of other nations can practice their faith only in private and are barred from evangelizing or propagating their faith. All residents are required to teach their children the Muslim faith. The president, ministers, parliamentarians, and chiefs of the atolls are required to be Sunni Muslims. Government regulations are based on Islamic law. Only certified Muslim scholars can give fatawa.

As of 2021, freedom of religion remained significantly restricted. Individual societal abuses and discrimination based on religious beliefs or practices have been reported. According to many officials and interlocutors, most citizens regarded Islam as one of their society's most distinctive characteristics and believed that having it established as the state religion promotes harmony and national identity. Since 2014, apostasy from Islam has been punishable by death.

== Religions demography ==
The country has an area of 1,300 square kilometres (500 sq mi) distributed across 1,200 coral atolls and islands, with a population of around 450,000.

The population is a distinct ethnic group with historical roots in South Indian, Sinhalese, and Arab communities. The vast majority of the Muslim population practices Sunni Islam.

Non-Muslim foreigners, including more than 500,000 tourists who visit annually (predominantly Europeans and Chinese) and approximately 54,000 foreign workers (mainly Pakistanis, Sri Lankans, Indians, and Bangladeshis), are in general allowed to practice their religions only in private. Although Muslim tourists and Muslim foreign workers are allowed to attend local mosque services, in the past most practice Islam in private or at mosques located at the resorts where they work and live.

The government states that the country is 100% Muslim. Independent figures in 2020 showed that the country is 98.69% Muslim, 0.65% Buddhist, 0.29% Christian and 0.29% Hindu; there is also a small number of Baháʼís and agnostics.

== Status of religious freedom ==
=== Legal and policy framework ===
Freedom of religion is significantly restricted. The constitution designates Islam as the state religion and requires citizens to be Muslim; it also stipulates that the President must be Sunni Muslim.

The constitution specifies that judges must use sharia law in deciding matters not otherwise addressed; sharia is not considered applicable to non-Muslims.

Foreigners were not allowed to import any items deemed "contrary to Islam," including alcohol, pork products, or idols for worship. Alcoholic beverages were available to tourists on resort islands, but it remains against the law to offer alcohol to a local citizen.

Men who wish to act as imams must sit for public exams. Certified imams must use government-approved sermons in Friday services.

Islam is a compulsory subject for all primary and secondary school students.

=== Religious conversions and persecution of individuals ===
In 2010, Ismail Mohamed Didi, a Maldivian atheist who was being investigated for his "lack of belief" and had sought asylum in Britain, allegedly committed suicide.

On 29 May 2010, Mohamed Nazim, a student of philosophy from a devout Muslim family, was at a public meeting in the Maldives discussing the subject of religion. He declared at the meeting that his own comparative studies on philosophy had meant he could not accept Islam, and declared himself to be an atheist. He was immediately arrested, under the pretext of saving him from being attacked for his beliefs by others at the meeting. After three days of intense counseling, he publicly converted back to Islam. Even so, the Maldivian Police submitted his case to their public prosecutors office as of 29 August 2010.

Death penalty for apostasy from Islam (along with certain other offenses) was incorporated into Maldivian law on 27 April 2014 for any person aged above 7 years.

== Societal abuses and discrimination ==
According to the Special Rapporteur on Freedom of Religion or Belief's February 2007 report, "members of local congregations on some of the islands do not allow foreign manual laborers to attend the mosque." The government denied these allegations.

When the Special Rapporteur on Freedom of Religion or Belief visited the Maldives' only prison, she found non-Muslim prisoners "unable to perform their prayers due to the objections of their Maldivian cellmates." There were no accommodations made for Hindu prisoners with dietary restrictions.

The Special Rapporteur on Freedom of Religion or Belief also reported on the issue of women wearing headscarves. She received reports that women were being pressured to cover by relatives, other citizens, self-proclaimed preachers, or newly formed political parties. Furthermore, she was told that women began to cover after state-owned media reported that the 2004 tsunami was the "result of Maldivians failing to live in accordance with Islam." There was one report of a female student who was excluded from school for not wearing a headscarf.

On Human Rights Day, 10 December 2011, protesters led by Ismail Khilath Rasheed, calling themselves ‘Silent Solidarity’, gathered at the Artificial Beach to protest religious intolerance in the Maldives. They were attacked and threatened.

The Centre for Civil and Political rights, based in Geneva, Switzerland, and the Human Rights Committee are working to establish new guidelines with the Maldivian government on human rights. The Committee has welcomed the following legislative and institutional measures taken by the State: The removal by the Parliament, in 2008, of the gender bar on running for presidency; the enactment of the Anti-Domestic Violence Act, in April 2012. The 27 July 2012, Human Rights Committee report listed more recommendations and principal matters of concern and expressed hope that the Maldivan State Party would continue on its path for equal rights, freedom of religion, and decriminalization of same-sex relationships.

In 2023, the country was scored zero out of 4 for religious freedom; it was also noted that non-Muslim foreigners are only permitted to observe their religions privately.

According to Open Doors in 2024, the country was rated as the 18th worst place in the world to be a Christian.

== See also ==
- Buddhism in the Maldives
- Christianity in the Maldives
- Islam in the Maldives
- History of the Maldives
- Religion in the Maldives
