= Religion in the Maldives =

Religion in the Maldives
1. Islam (98.7%)
2. Christianity (0.29%)
3. Agnostics (0.29%)
4. Hindu (0.29%)
5. Others (0.74%)

Islam is the state religion of the Maldives. The 2008 Constitution or "Fehi Qānoon" declares the significance of Islamic law in the country. The constitution requires that citizenship status be based on adherence to the state religion, which legally makes the country's citizens hundred percent Muslim. However, residents, tourists and workers in the Maldives are free to be of any religion and practise them in private. In 2020, studies found that 0.29% of the population is Christian (roughly split between Catholic and Protestant). Buddhism had previously been the predominant religion of the Maldives for about a millennia until at least the 12th century, when it was gradually replaced by Islam over the centuries.

During the late 1990s, the Supreme Council for Islamic Affairs issued warnings, cautioning individuals against listening to radio programs broadcast in the Dhivehi language by the Far East Broadcasting Association, headquartered in the Seychelles. In 1998, 50 Maldivian Christians faced arrest and were detained on the prison island of Dhoonidhoo, while foreign Christians suspected of engaging in missionary activities were expelled from the country.

Islam in the Maldives is primarily represented by the Ministry of Islamic Affairs, which oversees religious affairs and promotes Islamic values and teachings in the country. Additionally, the Supreme Council for Islamic Affairs plays a significant role in advising the government on matters related to Islam and ensuring the adherence to Islamic principles in Maldivian society. Mosques and religious scholars also contribute to the representation and practice of Islam in the Maldives.

In the Maldives, while Islam is the predominant religion and holds the status of the state religion, there are small communities of other faiths present in the country. These communities include Christians, Buddhists, and Hindus, among others. Foreign residents, such as expatriate workers and tourists, often practice their respective religions in private settings, respecting the predominantly Islamic culture of the Maldives. Despite the limitations, efforts towards interfaith dialogue and understanding have been observed, contributing to a diverse cultural landscape within the Maldives.

== History ==
The significant role played by Arab traders in the Indian Ocean during the 12th century likely contributed to the conversion of Dhovemi, the last Buddhist king of the Maldives, to Islam in the year 1153. Muhammad al-Adil, initiating a series of six Islamic dynasties consisting of eighty-four sultans and sultanas that lasted until 1932 when the sultanate became elective.

=== Introduction of Islam ===
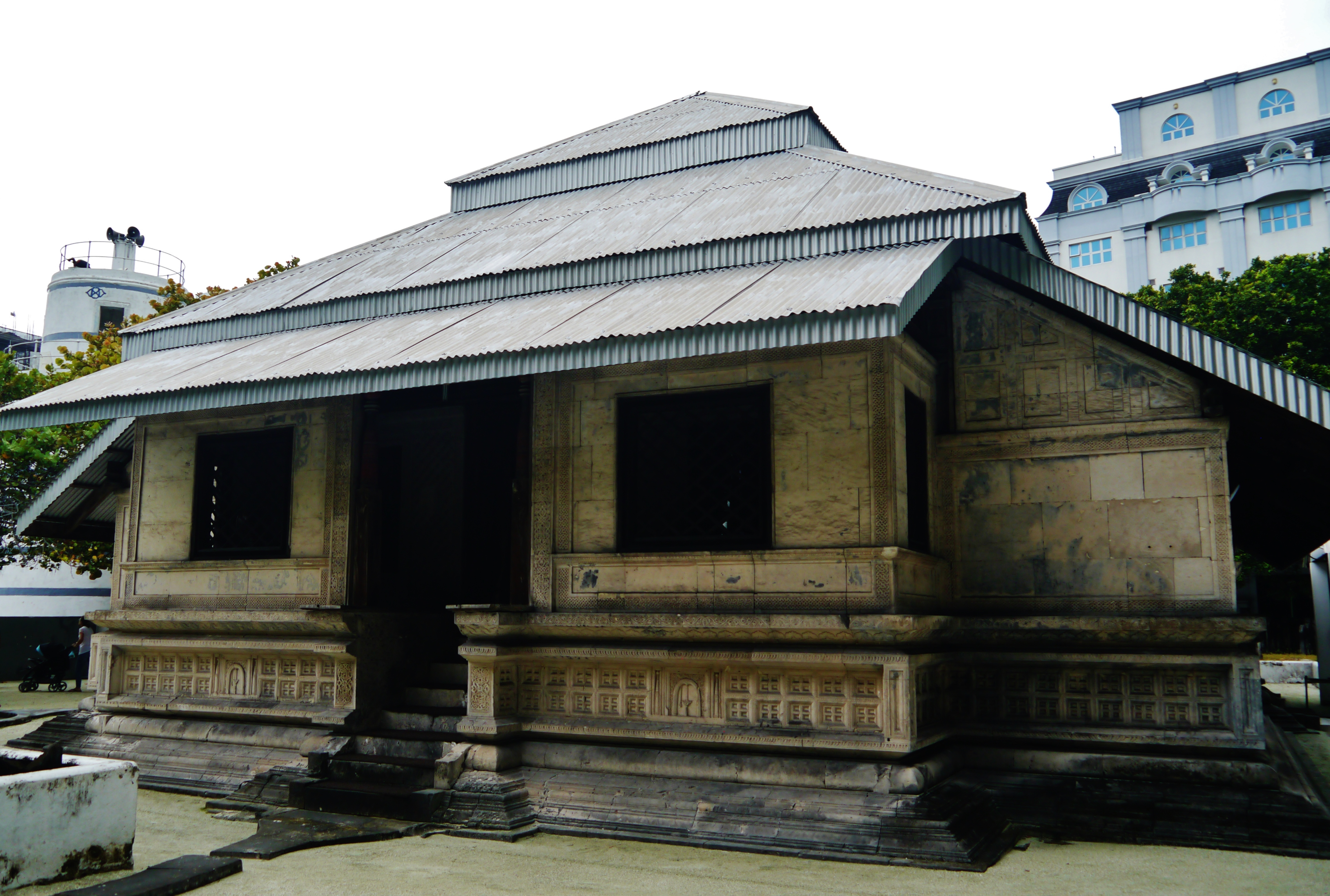
Malé old friday mosque

Arab interest in the Maldives also was reflected in the residence there in the 1340s of Ibn Battutah. The renowned Moroccan traveler documented the tale of Abu al-Barakat Yusuf al-Barbari, hailing from North Morocco, who is believed to have played a pivotal role in spreading Islam in the Maldives. According to accounts, he purportedly persuaded the local king to embrace Islam after purportedly defeating Rannamaari, a sea monster. Even though this report has been contested in later sources, it does explain some crucial aspects of Maldivian culture. For instance, historically Arabic has been the prime language of administration there, instead of the Persian and Urdu languages used in the nearby Muslim states. Another link to North Africa was the Maliki school of jurisprudence, used throughout most of North Africa, which was the official one in the Maldives until the 17th century.

However, certain scholars have proposed the possibility that Ibn Battuta might have misinterpreted Maldivian texts, potentially influenced by a bias or preference for the North African Maghrebi/Berber narrative surrounding this Shaykh. This theory suggests that Ibn Battuta may have overlooked or downplayed the alternative account of East African origins, which was also known during that period.

== Statistics ==
=== Religious affiliations ===
Since the Maldives requires that citizenship status be based on adherence to the state religion, census from religion are not taken, since then—the Maldives' biggest religion is Sunni Islam, with a percentage of 100. However, including the foreigners living in the country, Muslims become a percentage of 98.69%.

Non-Muslim foreigners, including more than 500,000 tourists who visit annually (predominantly Europeans and Chinese) and approximately 54,000 foreign workers (mainly Pakistanis, Sri Lankans, Indians, and Bangladeshis), are in general allowed to practice their religions only in private. Although Muslim tourists and Muslim foreign workers are allowed to attend local mosque services, in the past most practice Islam in private or at mosques located at the resorts where they work and live.

Year	Maldives residents religion by percentage
1950	99.9% Muslims
1970	99.8% Muslims
2000	98.4% Muslims
2020	98.7% Muslims

==== Other ====
Religion	Percentage
Islam	98.69%
Christianity	0.29%
Hindu	0.29%
Non—Religious	0.06%
Buddhists	0.65%
Baha'is	0.03%

== Islam ==
Islam is the predominant religion of the country and is recognised as the state's official religion. It is practised by about 99 percent of Maldivians. Numerous significant Muslim holy days are celebrated as national holidays in the Maldives, including Eid al-Fitr, marking the end of Ramadan; Eid al-Adha, commemorating the end of the Hajj pilgrimage. Islam is thought to have been brought to the Maldives around the 12th century by Abu al-Barakat Yusuf al-Barbari, a Moroccan traveller.

Embedded within the framework of the 2008 Constitution of the Maldives is the unequivocal mandate stipulating the obligatory adherence to Islam for every individual under the jurisdiction of the nation. This constitutional provision underscores the paramount importance of Islamic principles within the legal and societal fabric of the Maldives. Enshrined within this document is the recognition of Islam as the state religion, thereby establishing its pervasive influence across various facets of Maldivian life. By enacting this constitutional requirement, the Maldives reaffirms its commitment to upholding Islamic values, customs, and traditions as integral components of its national identity and cultural heritage. Consequently, all residents, citizens, and visitors within the territorial boundaries of the Maldives are bound by the legal imperative to observe and respect the tenets of Islam, reflecting the deeply ingrained significance of the faith within the socio-political landscape of the country.

== Religious minorities ==
=== Christianity ===
Christianity constitutes a minority religion within the Maldives. Felix Wilfred notes that the Christian population in the Maldives to be approximately 1,400 individuals, representing about 0.4% of the total population. The small community of Christians exists amidst a predominantly Muslim society, adhering to the state religion of Islam. Despite their minority status, these Christians maintain their faith, often practicing in private due to legal restrictions on public displays of non-Islamic religions in the Maldives.

Citizens in the Maldives who seek to convert to Christianity face the consequence of automatic loss of their citizenship. President Maumoon Abdul Gayoom asserted that the Maldives' preservation of its independence is contingent upon maintaining its status as a wholly Muslim nation. However, the Maldivian High Commission in Colombo refuted reports of persecution in 1998, stating them to be inaccurate and unfounded.

The presence of the Portuguese in the region marked the introduction of Christianity to the Maldives. However, rather than genuine conversion, the adoption of Christianity among the Maldivians was primarily motivated by the severe persecution and torture inflicted by the Portuguese upon those who adhered to Islam.{{citation needed}} Faced with the choice between conversion and survival, some locals reluctantly embraced Christianity.{{citation needed}} In 1558, the Portuguese established a modest garrison with a Viador (Viyazoru), overseeing a trading post in the Maldives, which they governed from their principal colony in Goa. Despite their efforts to impose Christianity on the populace, only a portion of the nobility succumbed to conversion.

=== Buddhism ===
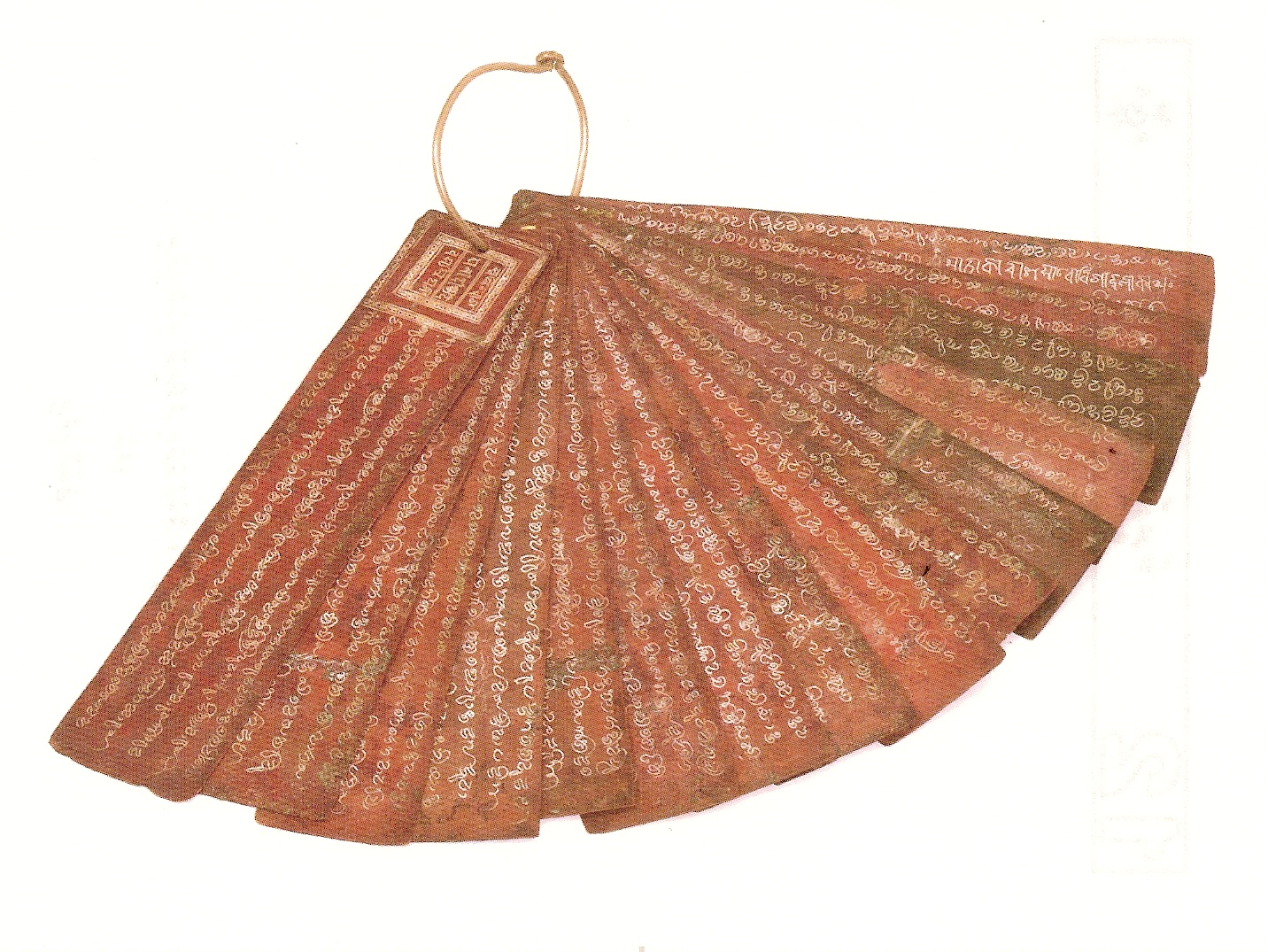
Isdhoo Lōmāfānu is the oldest copper-plate book to have been discovered in the Maldives to date. The loamaanu contains information about history of religion in the Maldives

Buddhism was the state religion of Maldives before 1153 CE. Maldives converted to Islam in that year. Recent archaeological evidence proves that until the advent of Islam, the Buddhist religion had existed in the country. Buddhist relics and ruins of monasteries have been found in many islands. Additional evidence of a Buddhistic past was found in late 12th century copperplate grants, translated in the 1980s.

Buddhism spread to the Maldives in the 3rd century BCE, at the time of Aśoka. Nearly all archaeological remains in the Maldives are from Buddhist stupas and monasteries, and all artifacts found to date display characteristic Buddhist iconography. Buddhist (and Hindu) temples were mandala shaped; they are oriented according to the four cardinal points, the main gate being towards the east. The ancient Buddhist stupas are called "havitta", "hatteli" or "ustubu" by the Maldivians according to the different atolls. These stupas and other archaeological remains, such as foundations of Buddhist buildings Vihara, compound walls and stone baths, are found on many islands of the Maldives. They usually lie buried under mounds of sand and covered by vegetation. Local historian Hassan Ahmed Maniku counted as many as 59 islands with Buddhist archaeological sites in a provisional list he published in 1990. The largest monuments of the Buddhist era are in the islands fringing the eastern side of Haddhunmathi Atoll.

Although Bell claimed that the ancient Maldivians followed Theravada Buddhism in the same manner as their Sinhalese ancestors from neighboring Sri Lanka, Maldivian Buddhist archaeological remains that were preserved in the Malé Museum in fact display Mahayana and Vajrayana iconography.

According to a legend in Maldivian folklore, a prince named Koimala from India or Sri Lanka entered the Maldives from the north (Ihavandhu) and became the first king from the House of Theemuge. Earlier, the Maldives had been settled by people of Dravidian origin from the nearest coasts, like the group today known as the Giravaaru who claim ancestry from ancient Tamils. It is unlikely that the Giraavaru islanders were the only early settlers in the Maldives. The importance they have been given is because they are mentioned in the legend about the establishment of the capital and royal rule in Malé. The Giraavaru people were just one of the island communities predating Buddhism and the arrival of a Northern Kingly dynasty and the establishment of centralized political and administrative institutions.

The copperplate grants, or loamaafaanus, of the 12th century record the names of the kings of the late pre-Islamic period. The first king recorded there is "the great King, Shri Mahaabarana of the noble house of Theemuge, the lord of the prosperous Lunar Dynasty", who ascended the throne in c.1118 CE. The king was the founder of the Theemuge dynasty, which ruled the country from c.1118 until c.1388. He is said to have become "king of this entire country" and ruled for a period of 21 years, perhaps implying that at the time of his accession to the throne, the country was divided, and that he brought the kingdom under one rule. King Mahaabarana is thought to be the Koimala of legend, a foreigner of noble blood who arrived in Maldives with his family, and was invited by the islanders to become their king. “Kaimal” is said to be a title given to certain Keralese noblemen, therefore it is quite possible that this was a nobleman from Malabar fleeing a hostile situation in his country. Mahaabarana was succeeded by his nephew, Swasthi Shri Tribhuvana Aadheethiya, who ruled for a period of 35 years. It was during Tribhuvana Aadheethiya’s reign, in the year 1153, that Maldives converted to Islam.

=== Hinduism ===
Before embracing Buddhism as their way of life, Maldivians had practised an ancient form of Hinduism, ritualistic traditions known as Śrauta, in the form of venerating the Surya (the ancient ruling caste were of Aadheetta or Suryavanshi origins). Hinduism in the Maldives describes the practice of the Hindu religion in the Maldives archipelago. Evidence suggests that Hinduism had a presence in pre-Islamic Maldives. Archaeological remains survive from the 8th or 9th century CE portraying Hindu deities such as Shiva, Lakshmi and the sage Agastya.

Maldivian folklore contains legends about the sage Vashishta, known locally as Oditan Kalēge, a mighty sorcerer. Oditan Kalēge's wife is the beautiful Dōgi Aihā who possesses a fiery temperament and is as powerful a sorceress as her husband. Her name is derived from the Sanskrit word Yogini.

== Freedom of religion ==
The 2008 Constitution of Maldives designates Sunni Islam as the state religion. Only Sunni Muslims are allowed to hold citizenship in the country and citizens may practice Sunni Islam only. Non-Muslim citizens of other nations can practice their faith only in private and are barred from evangelizing or propagating their faith. All residents are required to teach their children the Muslim faith. The president, ministers, parliamentarians, and chiefs of the atolls are required to be Sunni Muslims. Government regulations are based on Islamic law. Only certified Muslim scholars can give fatawa.

As of 2021, freedom of religion remained significantly restricted. Individual societal abuses and discrimination based on religious beliefs or practices have been reported. According to many officials and interlocutors, most citizens regarded Islam as one of their society's most distinctive characteristics and believed that having it established as the state religion promotes harmony and national identity. Since 2014, apostasy from Islam has been punishable by death.
