= Buddhism in the Maldives =

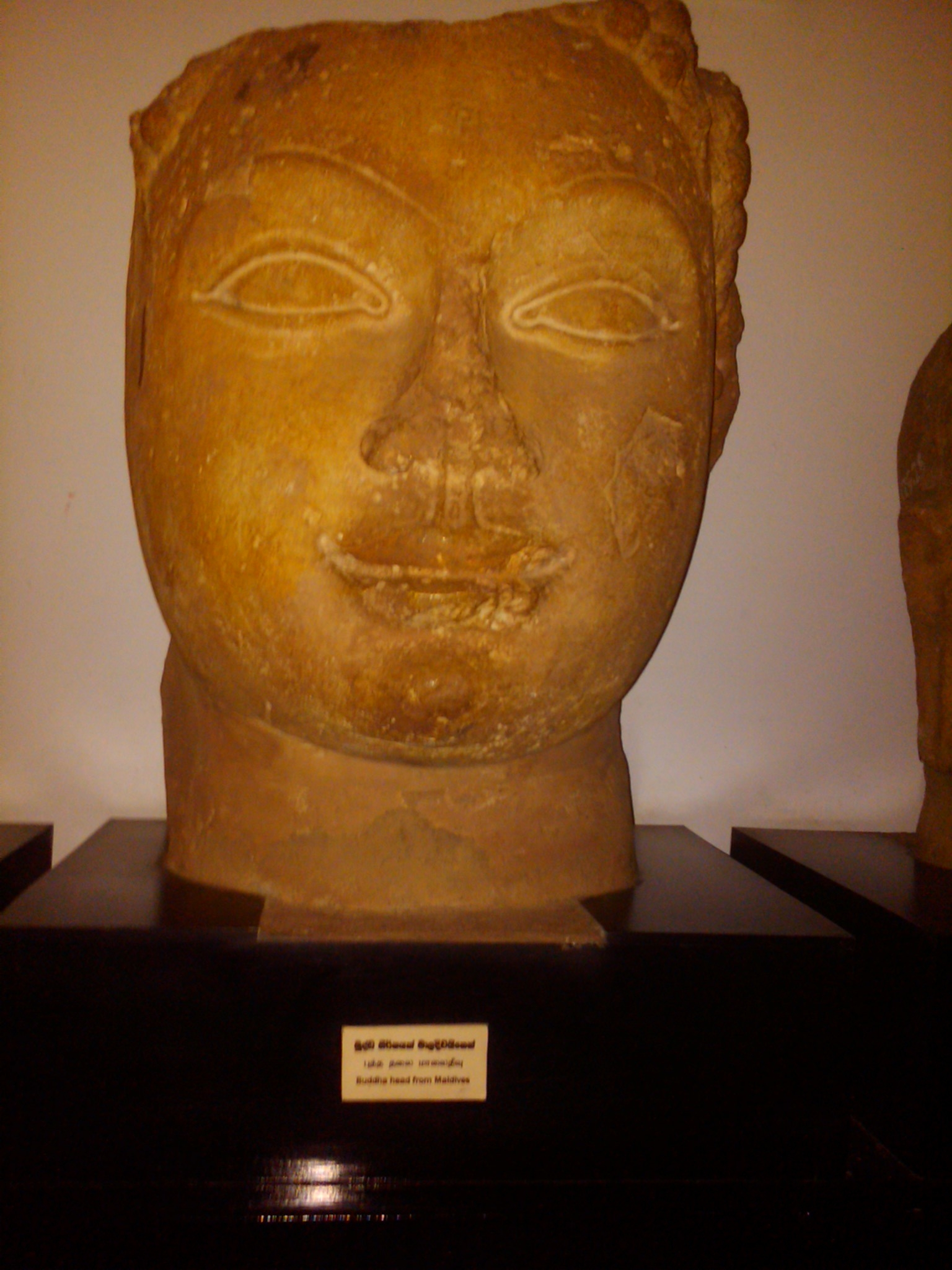
Historic Maldivian Buddhist statue, on display in Sri Lanka National Museum in Colombo 2011.

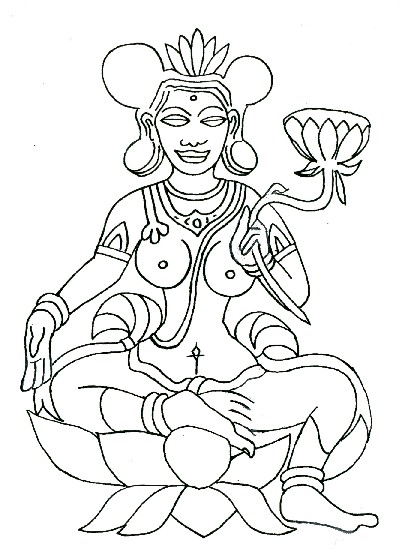
Ink on paper drawing of a 30 cm high etching on Porites coral stone from the 9th century kept at the museum in Malé. It represents Green Tara, a Vajrayana Buddhist female deity representing enlightened activity and fearlessness.

Buddhism was the predominant religion in the Maldives for about a millennia until at least the 12th century. Buddhism may have been introduced to the Maldives around the 3rd century BC and retained some lingering presence until the 14th to late 15th century. Evidence indicates that Theravada Buddhism was the earliest dominant school of Buddhism practiced in the Maldives until the growth of Vajrayana Buddhism from the 6th century onwards. In contrast, the closest neighbouring country to Maldives, Sri Lanka, has remained predominantly Buddhist.

== Scholarship ==
Western interest in the archaeological remains of early cultures on the Maldives began with the work of H. C. P. Bell, a British commissioner of the Ceylon Civil Service. Bell was shipwrecked on the islands in 1879, and returned several times to investigate ancient Buddhist ruins. He studied the ancient mounds, called havitta or ustubu (these names are derived from chaitiya or stupa) (Dhivehi: ހަވިއްތަ) by the Maldivians, which are found on many of the atolls.

Although Bell claimed that the ancient Maldivians followed Theravada Buddhism in the same manner as their Sinhalese ancestors from neighboring Sri Lanka, Maldivian Buddhist archaeological remains that were preserved in the Malé Museum display in fact Mahayana and Vajrayana iconography.

== History ==
According to a legend of the Maldivian Folklore, a prince named Koimala from India or Sri Lanka entered the Maldives from the North (Ihavandhu) and became the first king from the House of Theemuge. Prior to that the Maldives had been settled by people of Dravidian origin from the nearest coasts, like the group today known as the Giravaaru who claim ancestry from ancient Tamils. It is unlikely that the Giraavaru islanders were the only early settlers in the Maldives. The importance they have been given is because they are mentioned in the legend about the establishment of the capital and kingly rule in Malé. The Giraavaru people were just one of the island communities predating Buddhism and the arrival of a Northern Kingly dynasty and the establishment of centralized political and administrative institutions.

The ancient Maldivian Kings promoted Buddhism and the first Maldive writings and artistic achievements in the form of highly developed sculpture and architecture are from that period. The conversion to Islam is mentioned in the ancient edicts written in copper plates from the end of the 12th century AD.

There is a locally well-known legend about a foreign saint (Persian or Moroccan according to differing versions) who subdued a demon known as Rannamaari. According to legend, the islanders had to sacrifice young virgin women to the demon once a month. The young women would be left in a designated Buddhist temple to be killed by the monster but at one occasion, a Muslim traveler called Al-Barbari decided to go the temple in place of the current girl to be sacrificed (or accompanies the girl in other versions), where he read verses of the Quran there. After he recited the Quran, the demon disappeared and was never heard of again. Some Maldivian commentators have proposed that this legend may contain themes that hint to political and economic explanations for the conversion to Islam as contemporary Maldivian rulers sought to control the growing power of Buddhist clergy and began to rely on visiting Muslim clerics (who were often merchants as well and engaged in lucrative trade) to counteract their influence.

The Isdhū Lōmāfānu and the Haddhunmathi Dhanbidhū Lōmāfānu copperplates written in 1195–1196 CE describe the transition of the islands from Buddhism to Islam, stating that King Gadanaditya was trying to force the populace to convert to Islam even 40 years after the official conversion and attempted to destroy Buddhist shrines, indicating that the conversion wasn't instantaneous and Buddhist resistance to the conversion persisted.

When exactly Buddhism declined and eventually disappeared is uncertain. However, it was likely that Buddhism continued to exist in the Maldives for some time after the conversion to Islam due to the difficulty of traversing through the islands and spreading the religion in such an environment meant that many areas were unevenly influenced by it and therefore several islanders likely retained Buddhist customs for a longer period of time.

Archeological evidence indicates that Buddhism continued to exist for several centuries after the official conversion to Islam, with both religions coexisting. Islam became the majority religion of the Maldives by the middle of the 14th century. However, Buddhism continued to exist in a few places such as Kaashidhoo, where Buddhist temples and monasteries were possibly still in use up to the late 15th century. In 1599, Dutch sailor Frederick de Houtman described Buddhist monasteries and temples while visiting in the Maldives but they were likely in ruins by then.

== Legacy ==
Long after the conversion to Islam, Buddhist influence was still prominent in later Maldivian architecture, art and iconography. Additionally, several Buddhist structures were converted to Islamic or secular sites, along with portions of unused or ruined Buddhist sites later reused for future structures.

In February 2012, a group of Islamic extremists forced their way into the National Museum in Malé and attacked the museum's collection of pre-Islamic sculptures, destroying or severely damaging nearly the entire collection of about thirty Buddhist sculptures dating from the 6th to 12th centuries. Museum staff indicated that as the sculptures were made from very brittle coral or limestone it would be impossible to repair most of them, and only two or three pieces were in a repairable condition.

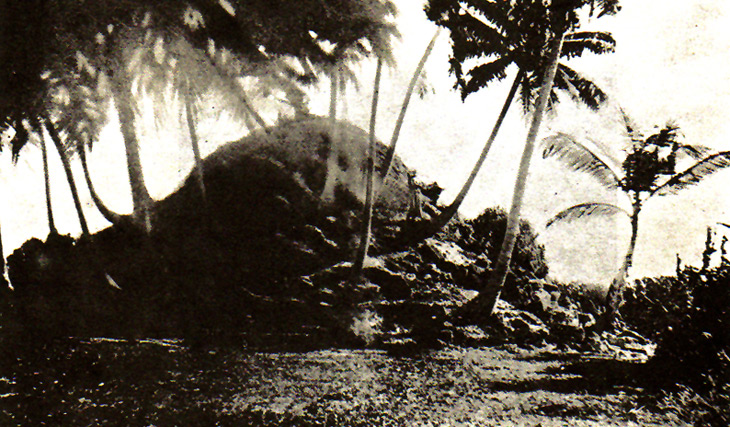
The Fua Mulaku Havitta, by H.C.P. Bell, in 1922.

== See also ==
- Freedom of religion in the Maldives
- History of the Maldives
- Religion in the Maldives
  - Hinduism in the Maldives
  - Islam in the Maldives
- Fua Mulaku Havitta
- Kuruhinna Tharaagandu
