= Hinduism in Asia =

Hinduism is an Indian religion and in terms of followers, it is one of the largest religions in Asia. In 2022, the total number of Hindus in Asia is more than 1.2 billion, more than 22.8% of Asia's total population. About 99.2% of the world's Hindus live in South Asia. with India having 94% of the global Hindu population. Other Asian nations with a notable Hindu population include Nepal, Bangladesh, Pakistan, Indonesia, Sri Lanka, Malaysia, and the United Arab Emirates.

== History ==
Hinduism expansion in Asia, from its heartland in Indian Subcontinent, to the rest of Asia, especially Southeast Asia, started circa 1st century marked with the establishment of early Hindu settlements and polities in Southeast Asia.

The roots of Hinduism started and emerged in the Indus river basin at the Indus Valley civilisation, nearly 3,000 BCE and spread through the Indian subcontinent, though the history of Hinduism overlaps or coincides with the development of religion in the Indian subcontinent since the Iron Age, with some of its traditions tracing back to prehistoric religions such as those of the Bronze Age Indus Valley civilization. It has thus been called the oldest religion in the world.

Hinduism spread in South and Southeast Asia through Hindu rulers and dynasties, and the reign of the Gupta Empire (the Gupta era) was considered the Golden period for Hinduism and the religion also spread to Central Asia (including Afghanistan) through the Silk route. There were also many Hindu colonies in West Asia due to significant trade with this parts of the world. Though with the Spread of Islam and Muslim conquests in the Indian subcontinent, Afghanistan and Southeast Asia, especially in Indonesia, Hinduism started declining and shrunk in these regions.

== Demographics ==
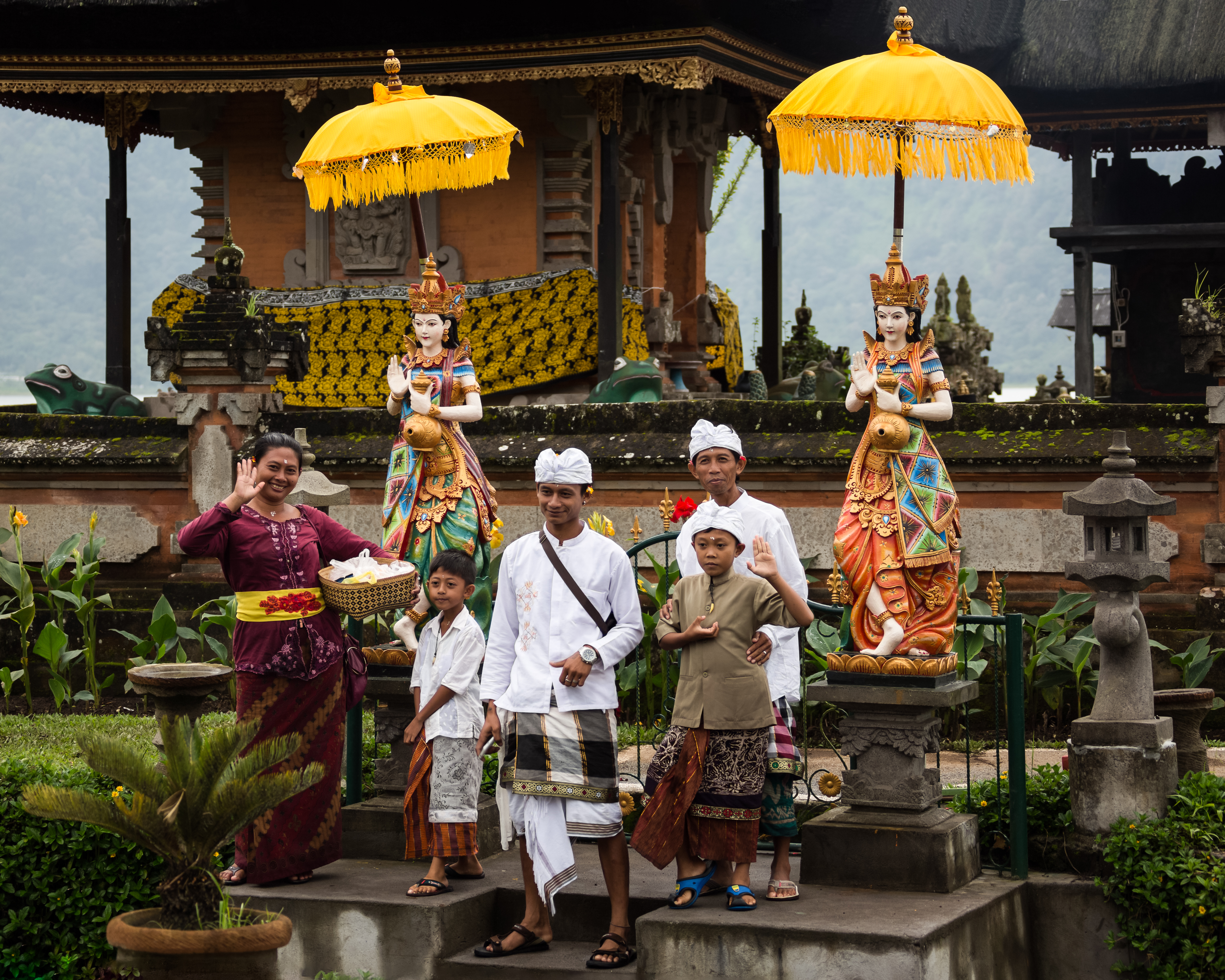
A Balinese Hindu family after puja at Bratan temple in Bali, Indonesia

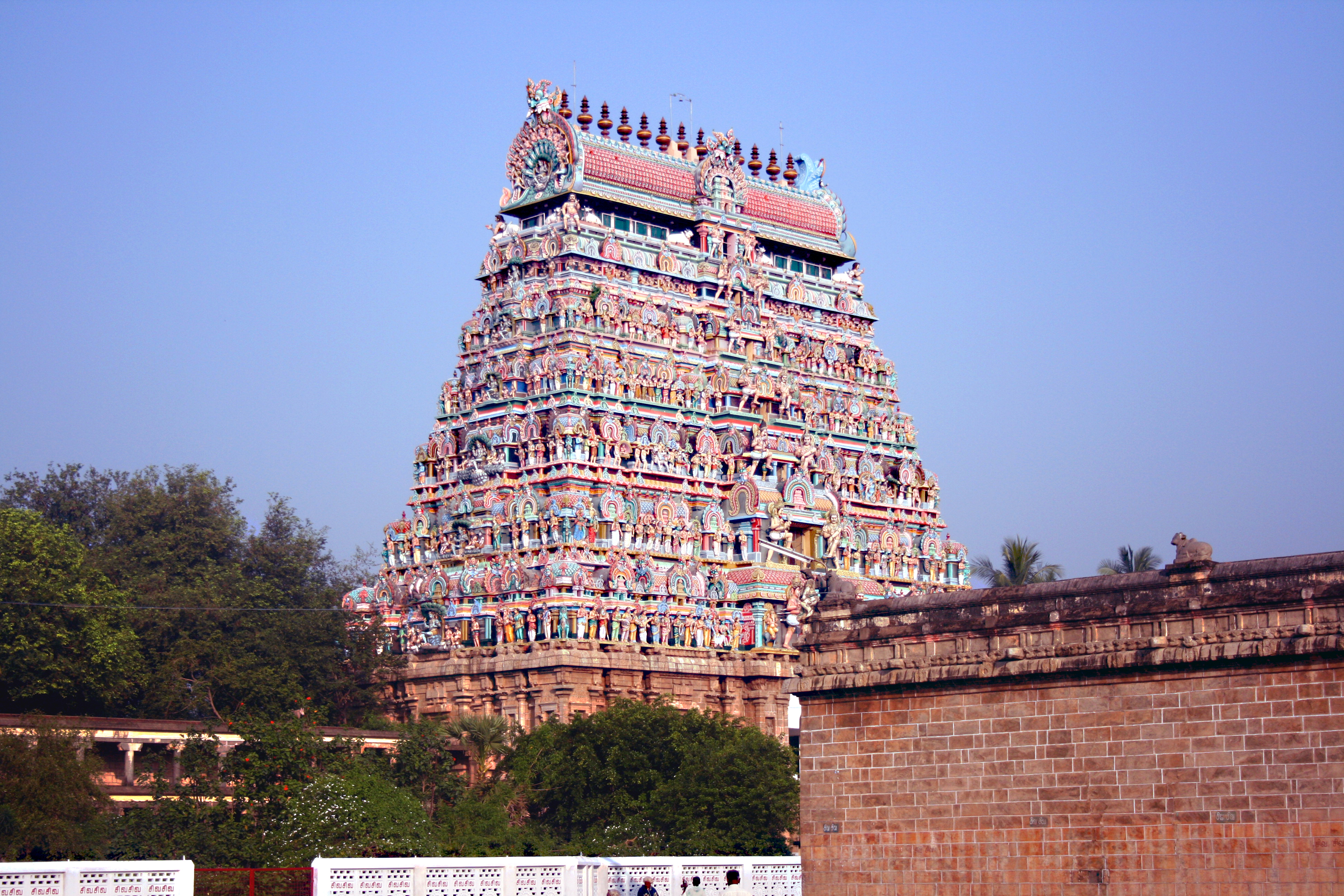
Natarajan Temple

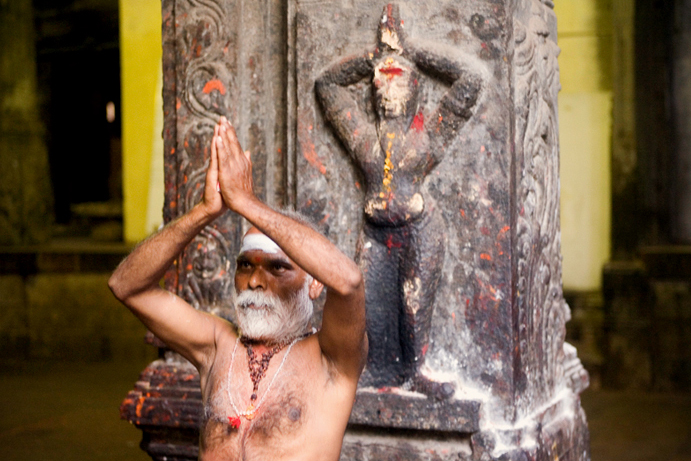
A Sadhu in Varanasi, Uttar Pradesh

=== Central Asia ===
| Country | Total pop | Hindus %age | Hindus pop |
|---|---|---|---|
| Kazakhstan | 18,744,548 | 0.01% | 12,732 |
| Kyrgyzstan | 6,019,480 | <0.01% | <1,000 |
| Tajikistan | 8,734,951 | <0.01 | <1,000 |
| Turkmenistan | 5,851,466 | <0.01 | <1,000 |
| Uzbekistan | 32,653,900 | 0.01% | 2,778 |
| Total | 72,004,345 | <0.01% | 16,000 (approx) |

=== East Asia ===
| Country | Total pop | Hindus %age | Hindus pop |
|---|---|---|---|
| China | 1,425,178,782 | 0.1% | 20,000 |
| Hong Kong | 7,448,900 | 1.6% | 119,182 |
| Macau | 658,900 | <0.01% | <1,000 |
| Japan | 126,420,000 | <0.01% | 30,000 |
| North Korea | 25,610,672 | <0.01% | <1,000 |
| South Korea | 51,635,256 | 0.04% | 24,414 |
| Mongolia | 3,231,200 | <0.01% | <1,000 |
| Taiwan | 23,577,488 | <0.01% | 1,900 |
| Total | 1,633,202,416 | 0.09% (approx) | 1,551,037 |

=== Middle-East ===
| Country | Total pop | Hindus %age | Hindus pop |
|---|---|---|---|
| Bahrain | 1,496,300 | 9.8% | 144,286 |
| Kuwait | 4,226,920 | 7.1% (Note: The estimates vary depending on whether temporary workers – with no residency nor right to openly practice their religion – are included or not. The official Kuwaiti government census data does not count Hindus as residents or citizens of Kuwait.) | 300,667 |
| Oman | 4,651,706 | 5.7% | 182,679 |
| Qatar | 2,561,643 | 13.8% | 358,800 |
| Saudi Arabia | 33,413,660 | 1.1% | 303,611 |
| (United Arab Emirates) Arab Emirates | 9,582,340 | 7.5% (Note: In the United Arab Emirates, only Sunni Muslims can become citizens, non Muslims there are working as work-class laborers and employees on a particular time and contract basis.) | 660,000 |
| Yemen | 28,915,284 | 0.7% | 200,000 |
| Total | 84,847,853 | 2.52% | 2,140,574 |

=== South Asia ===
| Country | Total pop | Hindus %age | Hindus pop |
|---|---|---|---|
| Afghanistan | 37,466,414 | <0.0001% | <50 |
| Bangladesh | 165,158,616 | 7.95% | 13,130,109 |
| Bhutan | 742,737 | 22.6% | 185,700 |
| India | 1,320,000,000 | 79.8% | 1,053,000,000 |
| Maldives | 369,031 | 0.01% | <1,000 |
| Nepal | 28,901,790 | 81.3% | 23,500,000 |
| Pakistan | 224,864,293 | 2.14% | 4,678,078 |
| Sri Lanka | 21,200,000 | 12.6% | 2,671,000 |
| Total | 2,032,080,415 | 68% | 1,068,727,901 |

=== Southeast Asia ===
| Country | Total pop | Hindus %age | Hindus pop |
|---|---|---|---|
| Brunei Darusalem | 374,577 | 0.035% | 131 |
| Cambodia | 13,995,904 | 0.3% | 41,988 |
| Indonesia | 259,000,000 | 1.74% | 4,646,357 (Note: The lower number is based on Pew Research estimate and is primarily concentrated in the island of Bali, Indonesia and nearby provinces of Indonesia. The higher number is based on a 2010 estimate by the Ministry of Religious Affairs of the Government of Indonesia. The largest Hindu organization in Indonesia Parisada Hindu Dharma Indonesia states that the Indonesian census greatly underestimates Hindu population, because predominantly Muslim nation of Indonesia does not recognize all forms of Hinduism, and only recognizes monotheistic Hinduism under its constitution.) |
| Malaysia | 30,949,962 | 6.3% | 1,949,850 |
| Myanmar | 50,279,900 | 0.5% | 252,763 |
| Philippines | 102,000,000 | <0.1% | 30,634 (2015) |
| Singapore | 5,600,000 | 5.0% | 280,000 |
| Thailand | 65,068,149 | 0.1% | 65,000 |
| Vietnam | 85,262,356 | 0.07% | 20,000 |
| Total | 571,337,070 | 1.118% | 6,386,614 |

=== West Asia ===
| Country | Total pop | Hindus %age | Hindus pop |
|---|---|---|---|
| Armenia | 2,975,000 | <0.01% | <1,000 |
| Azerbaijan | 10,027,874 | <0.01% | <1,000 |
| Iran | 81,871,500 | <0.01% | 20,000 |
| Iraq | 39,339,753 | <0.01% | <1,000 |
| Israel | 8,930,680 | 0.12% | 11,500 |
| Lebanon | 6,093,509 | <0.01% | <1,000 |
| State of Palestine | 4,816,503 | <0.01% | <1,000 |
| Syria | 18,284,407 | <0.01% | <1,000 |
| Turkey | 80,810,525 | <0.01% | <1,000 |
| Total | 253,149,751 | 0.018% | 46,000 (est) |

== See also ==
- Hinduism in Africa
- Hinduism by country
- Religion in India
