= Islam in the Maldives =

Islam is the state religion of the Maldives. The 2008 Constitution or "Fehi Gānoon" declares the significance of Islamic law in the country. The constitution requires that citizenship status be based on adherence to the state religion, which legally makes the country's citizens 100% Muslim.

== History ==
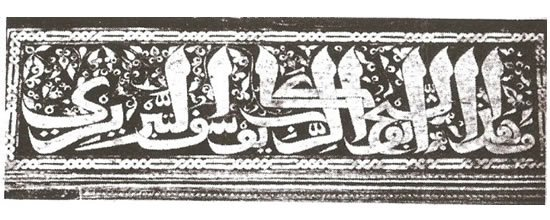
A Plaque in Hukuru Mosque, Malé, Maldives, placed by Sultan Ibrahim Iskandhar on which Abu al-Barakat Yusuf al-Barbari's name is written; his last name can also be read as "at-Tabrizi" instead of "al-Barbari"

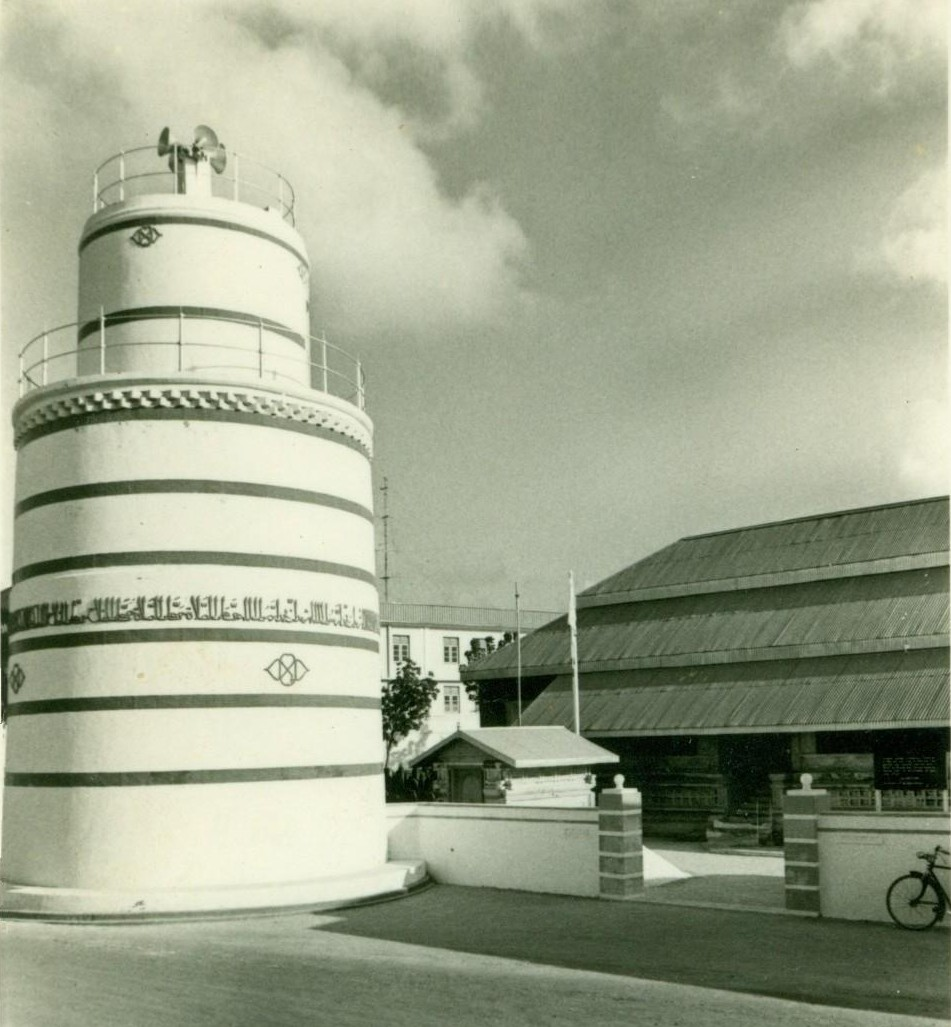
Malé Friday Mosque Minaret, 1981

Islamic influence in the Maldives may date as far back as the 10th century, with mentions of the region by Arabic accounts dating to around the 9th and 10th centuries. Some Maldivians were already Muslim before the conversion of the king around 1153, though it is generally accepted that the Maldives became Muslim starting from the 12th century A.D. The importance of the Arabs as traders in the Indian Ocean by the 12th century may partly explain why the last Buddhist king of Maldives Dhovemi converted to Islam in the year 1153 (or in 1193, for certain copper plate grants give a later date). The king thereupon adopted the Muslim title and name (in Arabic) of Sultan (besides the old Dhivehi title of Maha Radun or Ras Kilege or Rasgefānu) Muhammad al-Adil, initiating a series of six Islamic dynasties consisting of eighty-four sultans and sultanas that lasted until 1932 when the sultanate became elective. The formal title of the Sultan up to 1965 was, Sultan of Land and Sea, Lord of the twelve-thousand islands and Sultan of the Maldives which came with the style Highness. The person traditionally deemed responsible for this conversion was a Sunni Muslim visitor named Abu al-Barakat Yusuf al-Barbari. His venerated tomb now stands on the grounds of Medhu Ziyaaraiy, opposite the Hukuru Mosque in the capital Malé. Built in 1656, this is the oldest mosque in Maldives.

Scholars believe that the Islamization of the Maldives was a gradual process that likely took centuries, beginning before the official conversion of King Dhovemi and ending significantly after his conversion.

=== Introduction of Islam ===
Maghrebi/Berber theory Arab interest in the Maldives also was reflected in the residence there in the 1340s of Ibn Battutah. The well-known Moroccan traveller wrote how a Berber from North Morocco, one Abu Barakat Yusuf the Berber, was believed to have been responsible for spreading Islam in the islands, reportedly convincing the local king after having subdued Ranna Maari, a demon coming from the sea. Even though this report has been contested in later sources, it does explain some crucial aspects of Maldivian culture. For instance, historically Arabic has been the prime language of administration there, instead of the Persian and Urdu languages used in the nearby Muslim states. Another link to North Africa was the Maliki school of jurisprudence, used throughout most of North Africa, which was the official one in the Maldives until the 17th century.

==== Somali theory ====
Some scholars have suggested the possibility of Ibn Battuta misreading Maldive texts, and having a bias or felt partial towards the North African Maghrebi/Berber narrative of this Shaykh. Instead of the East African origins account that was known as well at the time. Even when Ibn Battuta visited an island of the Maldives, the governor of the island at that time was Abd Aziz Al Mogadishawi, a Somali.

Also another prominent Shaykh on the island during Ibn Battuta's stay, was Shaykh Najib al Habashi Al Salih, another learned man from the Horn of Africa. His presence Indicating a strong Horn of African Islamic presence on the Island.

Scholars have spoken that Abu al-Barakat Yusuf al-Barbari might have been a resident of Berbera, a significant trading port on the north western coast of Somaliland. Barbara or Barbaroi (Berbers), as the ancestors of the Somalis were referred to by medieval Arab and ancient Greek geographers, respectively. This is also seen when Ibn Battuta visited Mogadishu, he mentions that the Sultan at that time 'Abu Bakr ibn Shaikh Omar', was a Berber (Somali).

==== Persian theory ====
Another interpretation, in the Raadavalhi and Taarikh, is that Abu al-Barakat Yusuf al-Barbari was Abu al-Barakat Yusuf Shams ud-Din at-Tabrizi, also locally known as Tabrīzugefānu. In the Arabic script the words al-Barbari and al-Tabrizi are very much alike, since, at the time, Arabic had several consonants that looked identical and could only be differentiated by overall context (this has since changed by addition of dots above or below letters to clarify pronunciation – For example, the letter "ب" in modern Arabic has a dot below, whereas the letter "ت" looks identical except there are two dots above it). "ٮوسڡ الٮٮرٮرى" could be read as "Yusuf at-Tabrizi" or "Yusuf al-Barbari".

== Islamic influence ==
Islam is the state religion of the Maldives, and adherence to it is legally required for citizens by a revision of the constitution in 2008: Article 9, Section D and 10 states,

A non-Muslim may not become a citizen of the Maldives. The religion of the State of the Maldives is Islam. Islam shall be the one of the [sic] basis of all the laws of the Maldives. No law contrary to any tenet of Islam shall be enacted in the Maldives.

The traditional Islamic law code of sharia forms the Maldives' basic code of law, as interpreted to conform to local Maldivian conditions by the President, the attorney general, the Ministry of Home Affairs, and the Majlis. Article 142 of the constitution states,

When deciding matters on which the Constitution or the law is silent, Judges must consider Islamic Shari’ah.

Proselytizing by non-Muslims in the Maldives, including the public possession and distribution of non-Muslim religious materials (such as the Bible), is illegal. Public worship by adherents of religions other than Islam is forbidden.

On the inhabited islands, the mosque forms the central place where Islam is practiced. Because Friday is the most important day for Muslims to attend the mosque, shops and offices in towns and villages close around 11 a.m., reopening at 1 or 2 p.m., and the sermon begins by 12:35 p.m.

The prayer call is performed by the Mudhimu (Muezzin). Most shops and offices close for fifteen minutes after each call. During the ninth Muslim month of Ramadan, cafés and restaurants are closed during the day, and working hours are limited.

== Mosques ==
Most inhabited Maldivian islands have several mosques; Malé has more than thirty. Most traditional mosques are whitewashed buildings constructed of coral stone with corrugated iron or thatched roofs. In addition to regular mosques are smaller, temporary mosques which accommodate fewer worshippers. These mosques are built in less time and labour in place of other mosques and buildings and will be demolished later on.

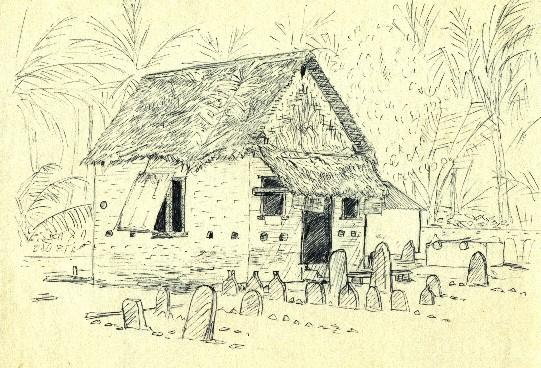
Dadimagi miskit in Fuvahmulah, 1981

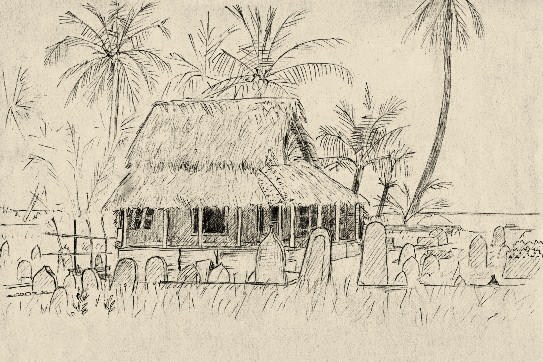
Kede-ere miskit in Fuvahmulah, 1981

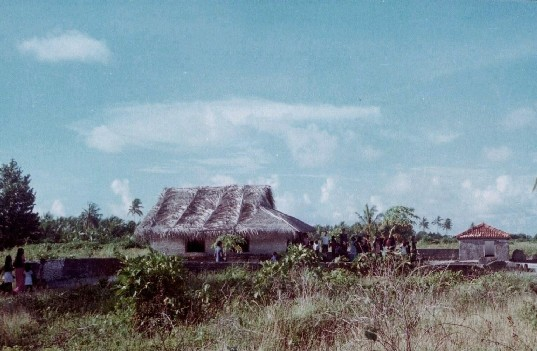
Gen Miskit, Fuvahmulah, 1984

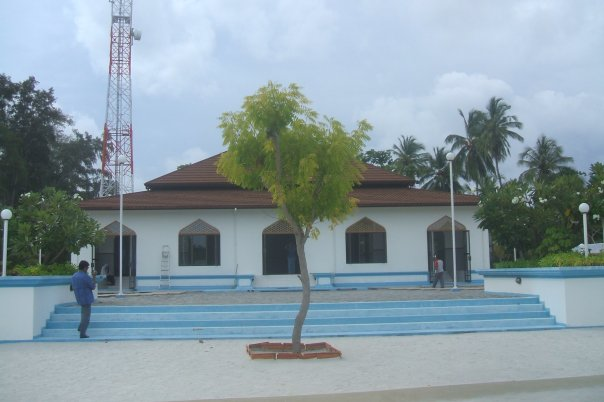
Dharavandhoo Friday Mosque

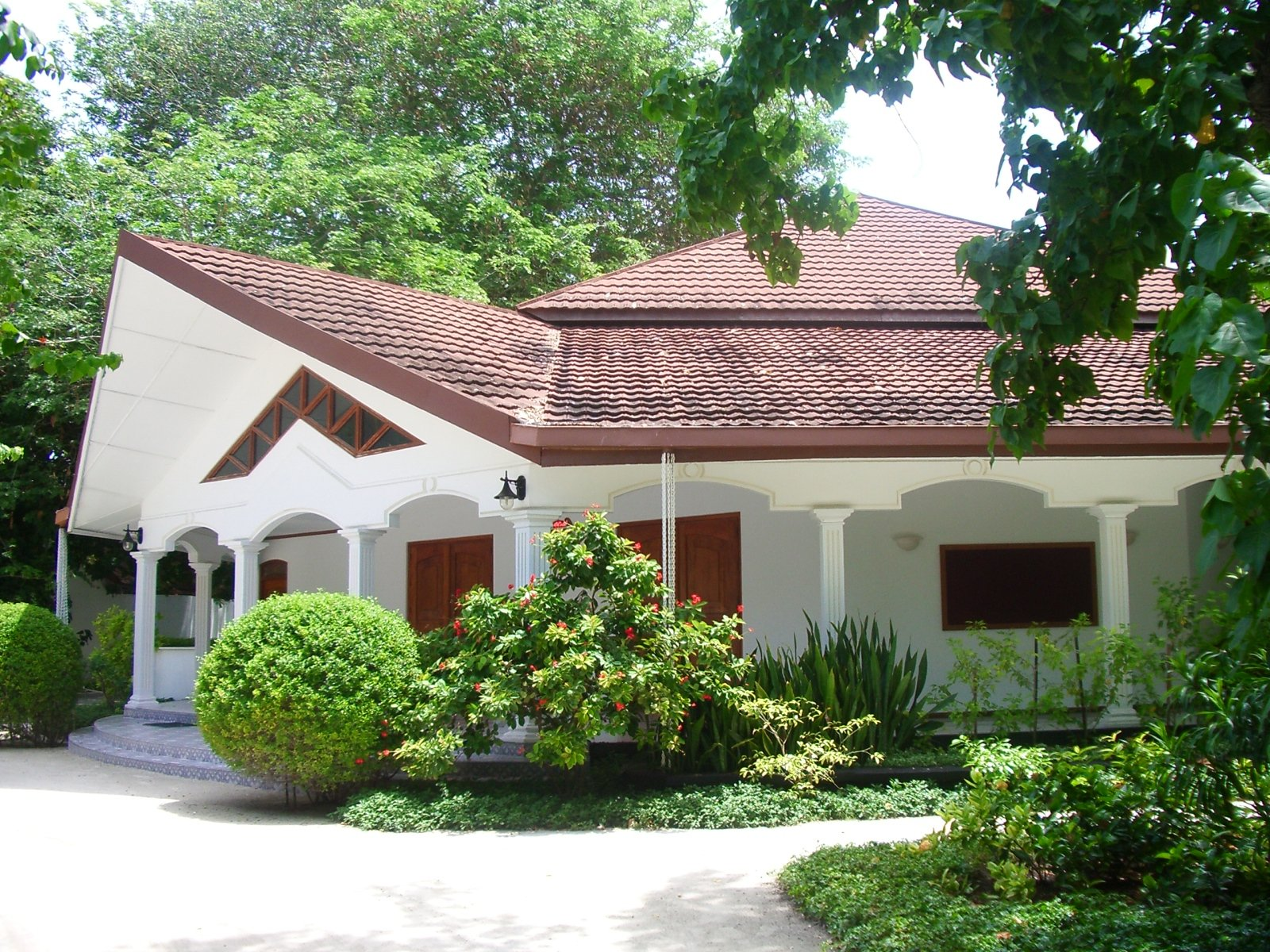
Bandos island mosque, North Male Atholl

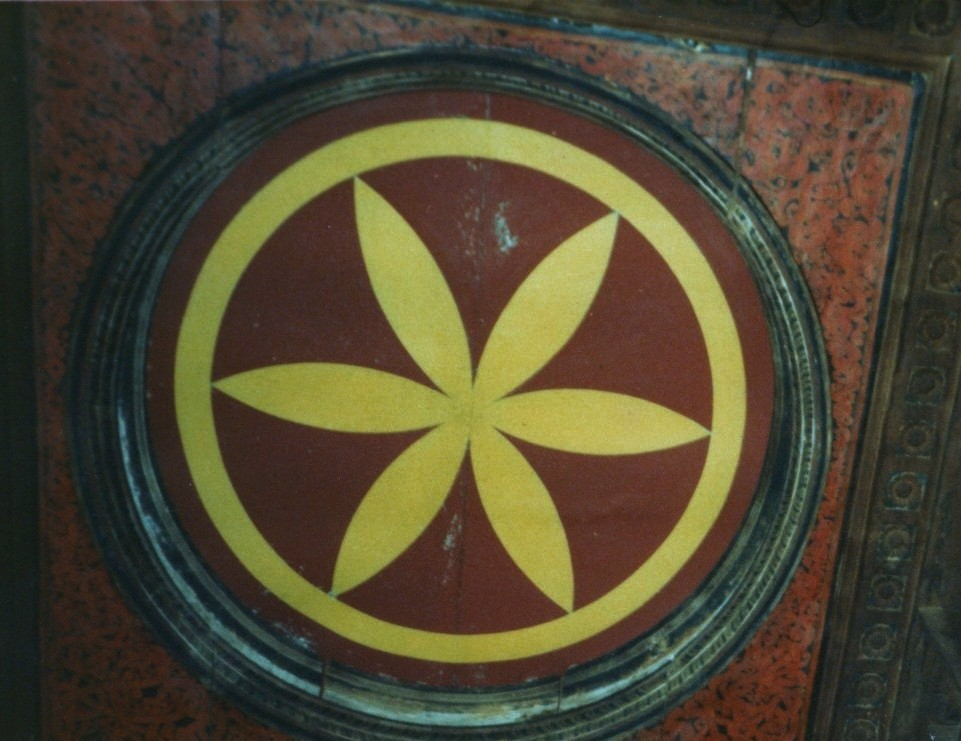
A mandala on the ceiling of Darumavanta Rasgefaanu mosque, Malé. Lacquered wood carving. The damaged Mandala was covered with a simple geometrical drawing painted on plywood.

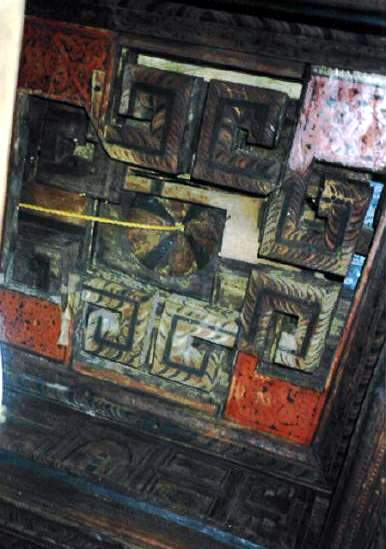
Photograph of a mandala on the ceiling. Lacquered wood carving; quite damaged. Kalhuhuraage mosque, Malé, Maldives, 1987

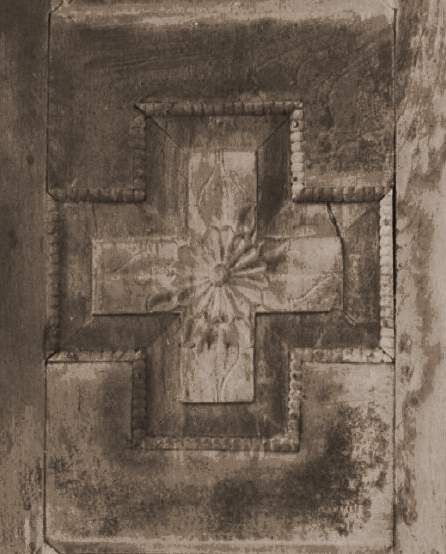
Photograph of a mandala carving on wooden door panel. Fua Mulaku Island, 1986

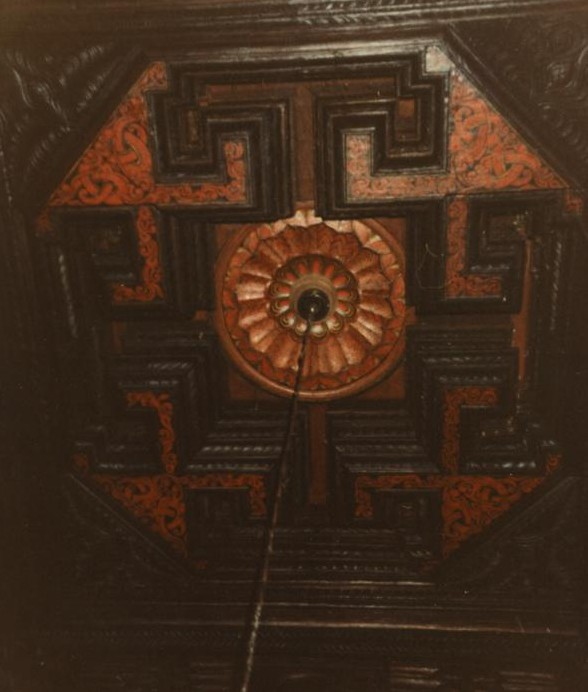
Photograph of a mandala on the ceiling. Lacquered wood carving. 'Idu mosque, Malé, 1989

In Malé, the Islamic Centre and the Grand Friday Mosque, built in 1984 with funding from the Persian Gulf states, Pakistan, Brunei, and Malaysia, are imposing, elegant structures. The gold-colored dome of this mosque is the first structure sighted when approaching Malé. In mid-1991 Maldives had a total of 724 mosques and 266 women's mosques. However in recent years, mosques made especially for women have been demolished and reconstructed for other purposes. All mosques in Maldives have a separate area where the women pray. Following the Islamic holy month of Ramadan is the holiday of Eid al-Fitr, and at early morning on this day the locals gather in congregation, usually at a large open field or park, to perform the Eid Salah.

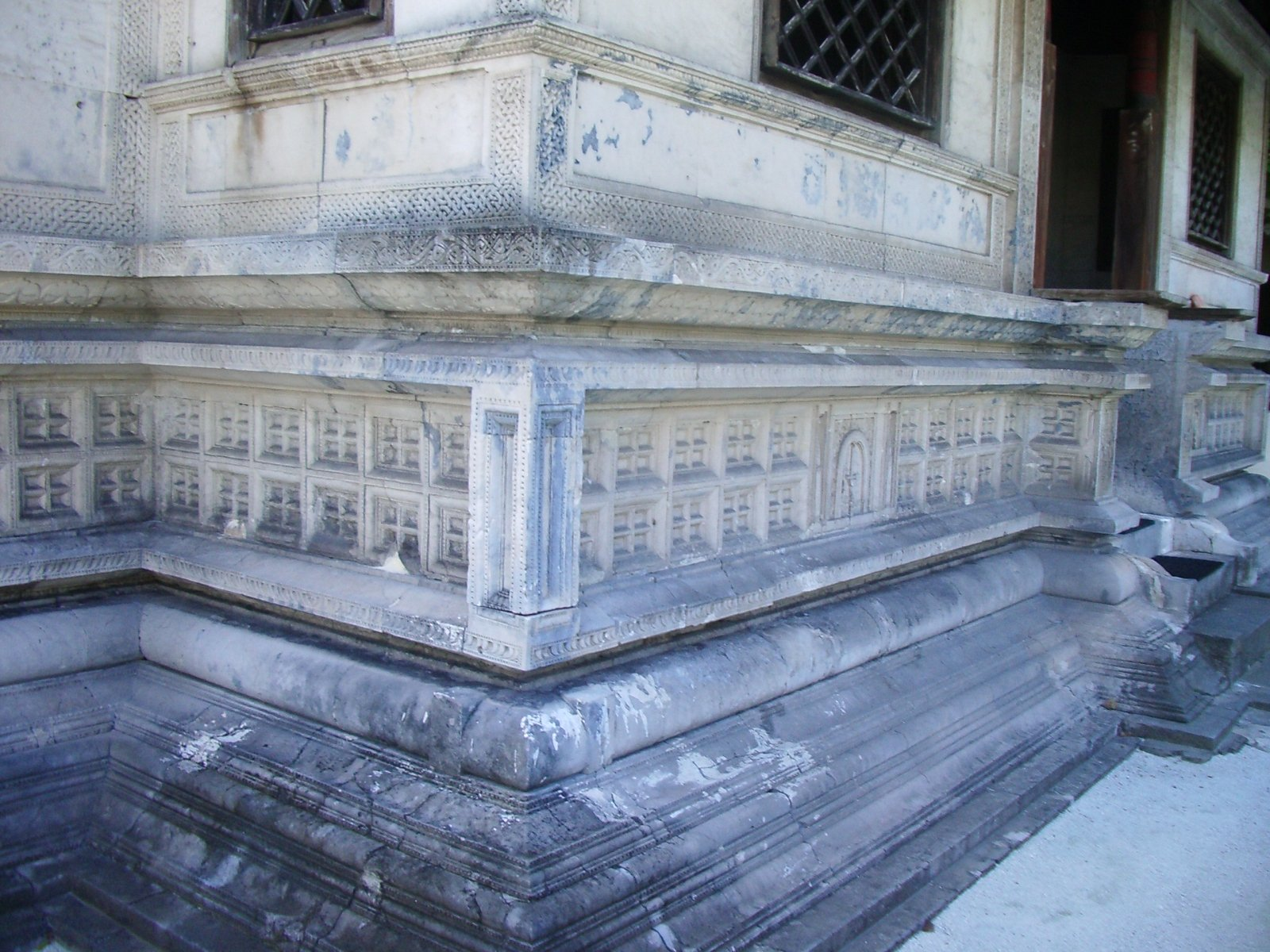
Old Mosque of Malé, white coral decorations

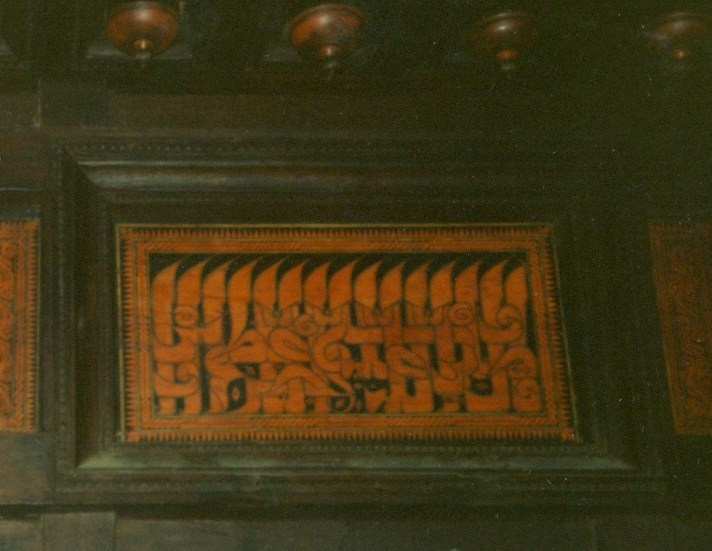
Sample of decorative Arabic writing on lacquered wooden panel. Idu Miskit, Malé

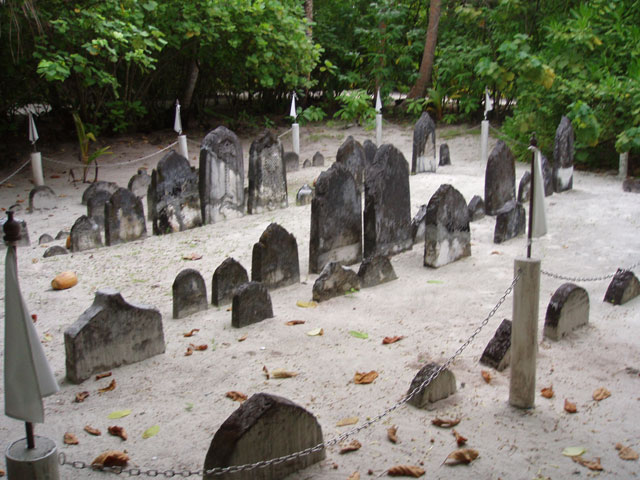
Filitheyo graveyard

== Radicalism ==
The Guardian estimates that 50-100 fighters have joined ISIS and al-Qaeda from the Maldives. The Financial Times puts the number at 200.

- 2007 Malé bombing: On 29 September 2007, a homemade bomb went off in Sultan's Park near the Islamic Centre in the Maldivian capital Malé, injuring 12 foreign tourists. In December, three men were sentenced to 15 years in jail after they confessed to the bombing. Two of those imprisoned, Mohamed Sobah and Ahmed Amin - both Maldivian natives in their early twenties-had their sentences changed from incarceration to three-year suspended sentences under observation and were later set free in August 2010.
- In February 2012, almost all the Maldives National Museum's pre-Islamic artifacts, dating back to before the 12th century, were destroyed during an attack: "Some of the pieces can be put together but mostly they are made of sandstone, coral and limestone, and they are reduced to powder." He said the museum had "nothing [left] to show" of the country's pre-Islamic history. Among the damaged objects were a six-faced coral statue, an 18 in (46 cm) high bust of Buddha, as well as assorted limestone and coral statues

== Religious Stand of Maldives and Public Etiquette ==
In 2008 after the ratification of the new constitution, multi-party democracy was instituted in the Maldives.

The Maldivian religious party named the Adhaalath Party was founded by the religious scholars and religious activists. Under the new freedom of speech and relaxed laws radicalism and different forms of religious factions rose in Maldives.

The newly permitted religious extremism was moderated by the state attempting to integrate Islamists into the administration, with coalition governments made between Maldivian Democratic Party the Adhaalath Party's following the first election in 2008. The Islamic Ministry and major executive portfolio is represented by the Adaalath Party. In the Maldives, general clothing guidelines are observed as per democratic law instated and extremism is punishable by lengthy jail sentences.

== See also ==
- Freedom of religion in the Maldives
- Islam in South Asia
