= Hinduism in Bhutan =

Bhutanese Hindus
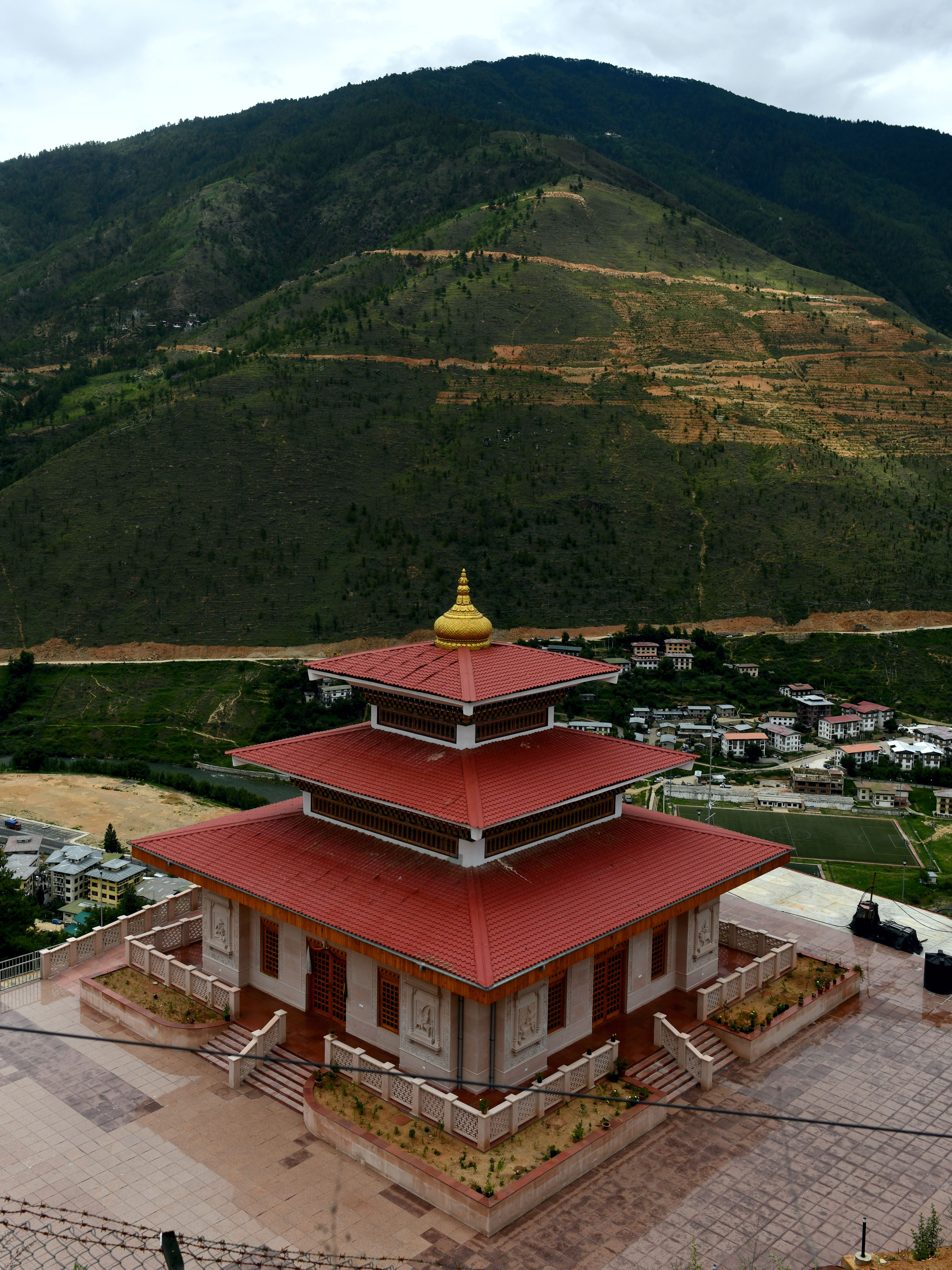
- Hindu Dharma Samudaya Temple, Kuensel Phodrang, Thimphu, Bhutan

Total population
- 1,73,300 (2020); 22.5% of total population

Religions
- Hinduism

Hinduism is the second largest religious affiliation in Bhutan, covering about 22.5% of the population, according to the Pew Research Center survey 2020. It is followed mainly by the ethnic Lhotshampa. The Shaivite, Vaishnavite, Shakta, Ganapathi, Puranic, and Vedic schools are represented among Hindus. Hindu temples exist in southern Bhutan, and Hindus practice their religion in small- to medium-sized groups. About 75% of the population of Bhutan are Buddhist.

== History ==
According to a legend it was ruled by a Cooch-Behar king, Sangaldip, around the 7th century BC, but not much is known prior to the introduction of Tibetan Buddhism in the 7th century CE.

There was strong presence of Hinduism in Bhutan during reign of Kamarupa Kingdom. Before 10th century CE, copper plate inscriptions indicate that land around the Kushiara was more densely populated, because Kamarupa kings had granted large tracts of land to immigrant brahmans and their supporting castes, to make this region part of Assam (Khanda Kamarupa).

== Festival ==
The main festival of Bhutanese Hindus is Dashain. It is the only recognized Hindu public holiday in Bhutan. It was recognized as a holiday in 2015 by the King of Bhutan. He also celebrated Dashain with Hindus that year. The first nine days of Dashain symbolize the battle which took place between the different manifestations of Durga and Mahishasura. The tenth day is the day when Durga finally defeated him. For other Hindus, this festival symbolizes the victory of Rama over Ravana as recounted in the Ramayana. They also prepare Sel roti during Dashain.

== Demographics ==
The government doesn't publish census result based on religion. According to the 2010 Pew Research Center Report, Hinduism is followed by 22.6% or about 1,58,200. Its 2020 report showed that there are about 1,73,300 Hindus forming 22.5 % of the population. According to the 2020 report by the World Christian Database Hinduism is followed by 11% of population.

The Gross National Happiness Survey covers religion, though its sample size was 11,440 in 2022 survey. According to the survey, Hinduism is followed by 12.2% of Bhutan's population, which is a decline from 14.5% in 2015 and 13.1% in 2011.

Most of the Hindus lives in the Southern part of Bhutan.

=== Distribution by district ===
The government doesn't cover population census or surveys based on religion. But it covers language in its surveys. Since Hindus in Bhutan are predominantly Lhotshampa Nepali-speaking people, which is supported by multiple government data and scholarly literatures. It may be used as a broad proxy for the Hindu population in Bhutan. However, this can be considered only as proxy and not a proper value of the Hindu population as Hinduism is practised by other indigenous non-Nepali communities like Drokpa, Lepcha and Doya.

The below table shows Centre for Bhutan Studies and GNH Research's 2015 GNH Survey on language.

Nepali (Lhotshamkha) mother tongue by dzongkhag, 2015
Dzongkhag	Nepali mother tongue (%)
Bumthang	2.16
Chukha	38.74
Dagana	34.23
Gasa	3.63
Haa	4.52
Lhuntse	0.85
Mongar	2.38
Paro	5.47
Pema Gatshel	1.56
Punakha	9.72
Samdrup Jongkhar	5.13
Samtse	56.25
Sarpang	39.80
Thimphu	14.03
Trashigang	0.96
Trashiyangtse	0.84
Trongsa	6.32
Tsirang	43.75
Wangdue Phodrang	6.25
Zhemgang	0.92
Bhutan	18.69

== Hindu Dharma Samudaya ==
The Hindu Dharma Samudaya of Bhutan is a Hindu religious organization established in 2009. It is registered with the Chhoedey Lhentshog, the Commission for Religious Organizations of Bhutan. HDSB is dedicated to promoting spiritual traditions and practices of Sanathan Dharma in Bhutan so as to foster and strengthen human values. Its head office in the capital city, Thimphu, the organization is managed by a board of directors of volunteers comprising representatives from Hindu priests and other HDSB members who are elected at an annual general meeting.

== Ethnic conflict with Nepali-speaking Hindus ==
=== 1990s Ethnic and Linguistic Conflict ===
In the early 1990s, several thousand residents in southern Bhutan were forcefully relocated by the authorities under the provisions of the amended Citizenship Act of 1985, because they had Nepalese ancestry.

Ethnic cleansing of the Nepali-speaking Lhotshampa community was carried out during the reign of King Jigme Singye Wangchuk in the 1990s, largely considered an ethnic linguistic conflict, though some argue that it targeted Nepali-speaking Hindus in Bhutan.

=== Refugees and diaspora ===
After the ethno-linguistic purge of the 1990s began, Nepali-speaking Hindus from Bhutan were forced to live in refugee camps set up by the UN High Commission for Refugees United Nations High Commissioner for Refugees (UNHCR) in eastern Nepal in 1992. With help of UNHCR and WHO, the majority of Bhutanese refugees are resettled to the United States, Canada, Australia, and European countries. There is a small number of refugees living in camps in Nepal still hoping to see their motherland for more than 30 years.

== Funding for Hindu Temples ==
The government provided financial assistance for the construction of Buddhist temples and shrines and state funding for monks and monasteries. NGOs alleged that the government rarely granted permission to build Hindu temples; the last report of such construction was in the early 1990s, when the government authorized the construction and renovation of Hindu temples and centers of Sanskrit and Hindu learning and provided state funds to help finance the projects. The government argued that it was a matter of supply and demand, with demand for Buddhist temples far exceeding that for Hindu temples. The Government stated that it supported numerous Hindu temples in the south, where most Hindus reside, and provided some scholarships for Hindus to study Sanskrit in India.

== See also ==
- Bhairabkunda Shiva Mandir-Only Shakti Peeda in Bhutan
- Freedom of religion in Bhutan
- Hinduism in Southeast Asia
- Religion in Bhutan
