= Structural abuse =

Process of unfair treatment by authority

Structural abuse is the process by which an individual or group is dealt with unfairly by a social or cultural system or authority. This unfairness manifests itself as abuse in a psychological, financial, physical or spiritual form, and victims often are unable to protect themselves from harm. An individual's inability to protect themselves may lead to their entrapment in the system, preventing them from seeking justice or recompense for crimes endured and damages incurred, creating a feeling of isolation or helplessness. Systems containing abusive structures are primarily designed to control individuals or manipulate them for material gain. Most social systems contain at least one structure that induces structural abuse. These structures, when allowed to exist, create a cycle of abuse, wherein the abuse is repetitive or contagious in nature, and may become acceptable in other parts of the system.

Structural abuse differs to structural violence in terms of scale – structural violence is a process occurring within an entire society, such as racism or classism, while structural abuse refers to a specific element of society, or a specific system within society. Abuse occurring on this smaller scale is not necessarily endorsed by wider society, such as modern witch hunts, which have been condemned in South Africa, regardless of deaths that still occur in areas retaining anti-Pagan social structures.

== See also ==
- State violence
