= Hinduism in the Maldives =

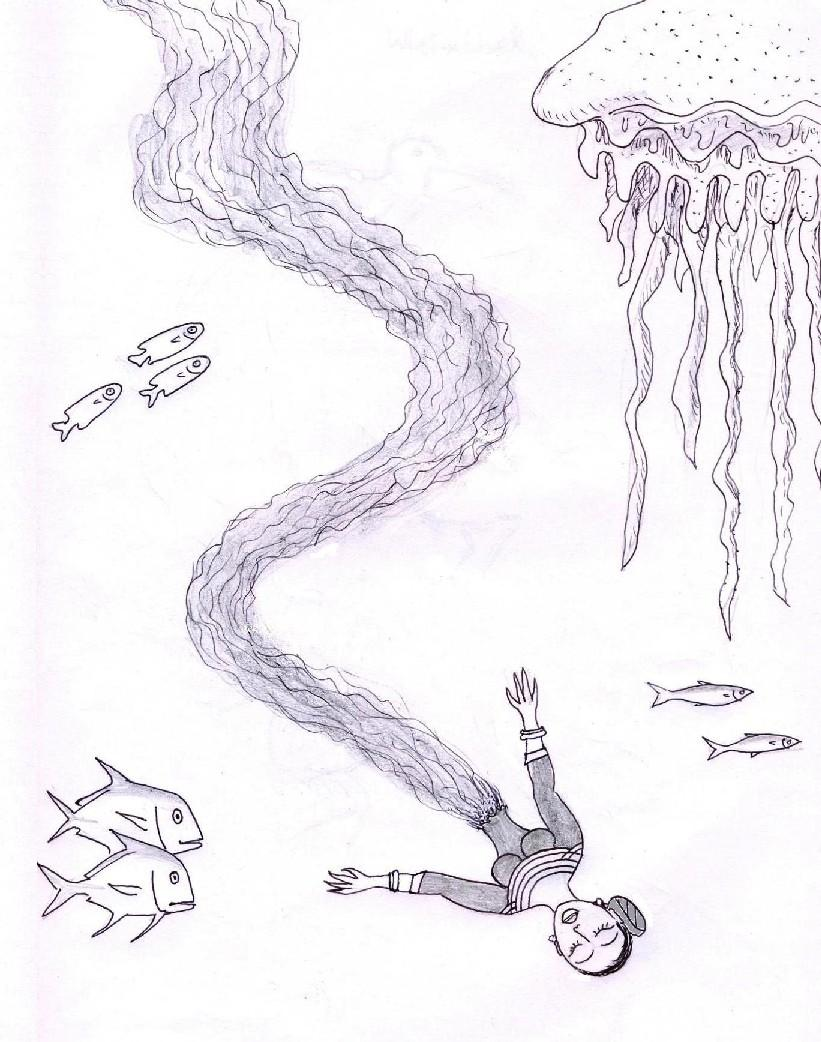
Donhiyala's death from the story Donhiyala and Alifulhu, Maldivian version of the Rāmāyana

The "Om" symbol in Thaana (Note: 옴 (U+110B & U+1169 & U+1106))

Evidence suggests that Hinduism may have had a presence in the ancient Maldives though scholars have disputed how significant its presence was or if it was formally practiced at all. Hinduism may have existed during the pre-Buddhist and Buddhist period of the islands but possibly disappeared sometime later during the latter period. Traces of its influences are still found in modern Maldivian culture and art.

== History ==
It's been disputed among scholars whether Hinduism as a distinct or separate religion existed in premodern Maldives but archaeological and textual evidence indicates that Hinduism may have had a presence in the ancient Maldives. Modern archaeological evidence has so far not found any artifacts or religious structures that can be explicitly linked to Hinduism as a practiced religion. Most artifacts that are labeled as Hindu may likely be part of Buddhist religious iconography and art.

According to legend, the arrival of the ārya (Aryans) from western India around the 6th or 5th century BCE brought Hinduism and other customs to the Maldives. Archaeological remains survive from the 8th or 9th century CE portraying Hindu deities such as Shiva, Lakshmi and the sage Agastya. According to historian Naseema Mohamed, Hinduism may have preceded the introduction of Buddhism around the 3rd century BCE. Mohamed and historian Andrew Forbes have suggested that Hinduism and Buddhism may have coexisted for many centuries, with Mohamed elaborating that some ancient Maldivians probably retained Hindu customs while others began converting to Buddhism. However, according to scholar Vini Vitharana, there is no clear evidence that another religion was formally practiced in the Maldives during the Buddhist period other than Buddhism.

It is not known why the last Buddhist king embraced Islam. The importance of the Arabs as traders in the Indian Ocean by the 12th century may partly explain why this king acted. He adopted the Muslim title and name (in Arabic) of Sultan (discarding the old Divehi title of Maha radun or Ras Kilege) Muhammad al Adil, initiating a series of six Islamic dynasties consisting of 84 sultans and sultanas that lasted until 1932, when the sultanate became elective.

According to Merinid traveller Ibn Batuta, the person responsible for this conversion was Muslim visitor Abu al Barakat from Morocco. However, a Maldivian tradition says that he was a Persian saint from Tabriz called Yusuf Shamsuddin. He is also referred to as Tabrizugefaanu. His venerated tomb stands on the grounds of the Friday Mosque, or Hukuru miski, in Malé. Built in 1656, this is the oldest mosque in the Maldives.

== Demography and status ==
Officially no native Maldivians are Hindus. The state religion is Sunni Islam and conversion is not allowed. Maldivian customs laws prohibit import of any idol for the purpose of worship. Religious freedom is substantially curtailed in Maldives and strict Sharia law is applied. Various sources give the number of Hindu adherents in the Maldives as over 1,000 as of 2015. These figures might represent foreign workers and residents.

Historical Population
Year	Pop.	±%
2007	29	—
2010	1,097	+3682.8%
2015	1,820	+65.9%

Year	Percent	Increase
2007	0.01%	-
2010	0.3%	+0.29%
2015	0.4%	+0.1%

== Folklore ==
Maldivian folklore contains legends about the sage Vashishta, known locally as Oditan Kalēge, a mighty sorcerer. Oditan Kalēge's wife is the beautiful Dōgi Aihā who possesses a fiery temperament and is as powerful a sorceress as her husband. Her name is derived from the Sanskrit word Yogini.

Among Maldivian folklore in which the spirit and sorcery theme are not essential, the most significant is perhaps "Don Hiyalā and Alifulhu". This story about two good-looking lovers is a much changed, Maldivian version of the Rāmāyana. Despite the apparent dissimilarities, the common sequential structure linking the elements of the Maldivian story with the Indian epic (the heroic married couple, the wicked and powerful king, the kidnapping of the beautiful heroine, etc.) Based on Ramayana it is related to Hinduism and the religious landscape of South Asia in general. This is hardly unexpected, for all South and Southeast Asian countries have local Rāmayāna variations and the Maldives is part of South Asian culture.

== See also ==
- Buddhism in the Maldives
- History of the Maldives
- Maldivian folklore
- Music of the Maldives
