= Hinduism in Denmark =

Hindus in Denmark
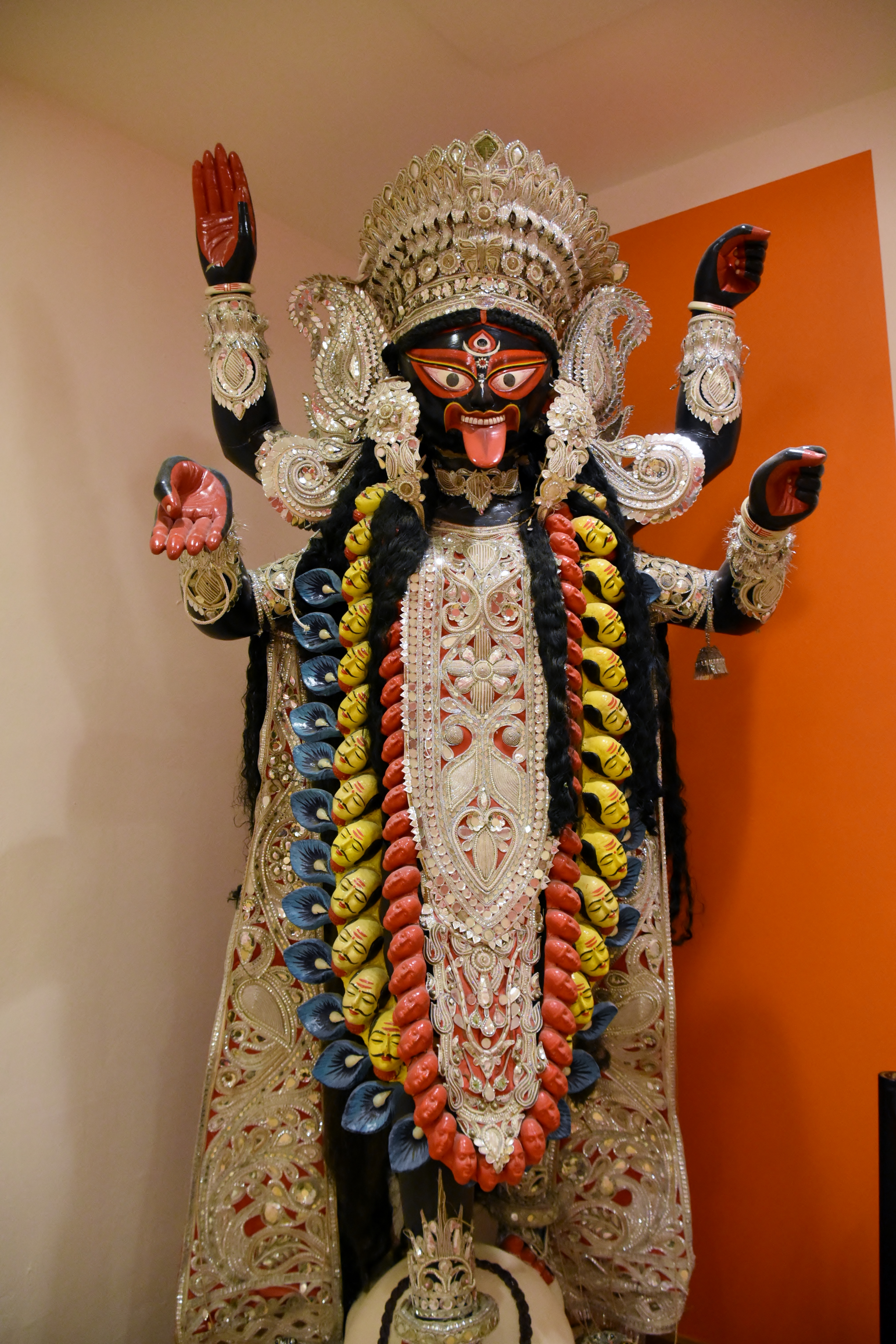
- Hindu goddess Kali in the National Museum of Denmark, Copenhagen

Total population
- ▲40,000 (2022) (0.5%) of total population

Regions with significant populations
- Copenhagen, Aarhus

Religions
- Hinduism

Languages
- Sacred; Sanskrit; Majority; Hindi, Tamil

Hinduism is a minority faith in Denmark. There are 40,000 Hindus in Denmark as of 2020, representing 0.5% of the total population.

== History ==
The first Hindus of Sri Lankan Tamil origin arrived in 1983 due to the escalating Sri Lankan Civil War. They were mostly men, and were categorized as de facto refugees. Today, many have married, established families, and settled in Denmark. Around half of the Tamils have been granted Danish citizenship.

Holding little hope for a solution to the conflict in the near future, they have begun to rebuild or reorganize some of their cultural and religious organisations in Denmark, aiming to fulfil the requirements of their traditions and those of Danish society at the same time.

Since the mid-2010s, Denmark has become home to many Indian professionals, a majority of whom identify themselves as Hindu.

== Demographics ==
It was estimated that there were about 12,000 Hindus in Denmark in 2010.

Most Hindus in Denmark have roots in Sri Lanka and India, numbering approximately 18,000–19,000 individuals out of a total population of 5.7 million in 2017. In 2020, Hindus constituted about 0.5% of the total population.

Hinduism is also represented among the ethnic Danish community. About 2,000 people of Danish ethnic origin belong to Hindu-related and Hindu-inspired groups.

Historical Population
Year	Pop.	±%
2010	12,000	—
2015	11,400	−5.0%
2017	17,100	+50.0%
2020	40,000	+133.9%

Year	Percent	Increase
2010	0.2%	-
2015	0.2%	-
2017	0.3%	+0.1%
2020	0.5%	+0.2%

== Temples ==
There are six Hindu temples in Denmark. There are two consecrated Hindu temples: two dedicated to Vinayakar or Ganesha, one to Velmurugan, and the other to the goddess Abirami, aside from the ISKCON temple and a Bharatiya madir in copenhagen region.

== Community ==
There are 9 registered Hindu groups in Denmark. The community is perceived to be peaceful and highly educated.

== See also ==
- Hinduism in Finland
- Hinduism in Norway
- Hinduism in Sweden
- Religion in Denmark
