= STL =

STL may refer to:

== Organisations ==
- Council for Religious and Life Stance Communities (Samarbeidsrådet for Tros- og Livssynssamfunn), Norway
- Send the Light, a British Christian book distributor
- Space Technology Laboratories, a former division of TRW Inc.
- Special Tribunal for Lebanon, an international criminal tribunal
- Standard Telecommunication Laboratories, a former UK research centre for Standard Telephones and Cables

== Places ==
- St. Louis, Missouri, US
  - St. Louis Cardinals, the city's Major League Baseball team
  - St. Louis Blues, the city’s National Hockey League team
  - St. Louis Lambert International Airport (IATA airport code: STL)
- Saint Lucia (UNDP country code)
- St. Laurence High School, co-ed high school in Burbank, Illinois, U.S.

== Science and technology ==
- Studio transmitter link, of a radio or television station
- Spurious trip level, of a safety or alarm system

=== Computing ===
- Standard Template Library, originally for the C++ programming language
- .stl, a file format for subtitles
- STL (file format), a file format for 3D CAD models
- Statement List, programming language for Siemens SIMATIC S7

== Transportation ==
- Société de transport de Laval, public transit in Laval, QC, Canada
- Société de transport de Lévis, public transit in Lévis, QC, Canada
- Southall railway station (National Rail station code: STL)
- Thousand Lights metro station (Chennai Metro station code: STL)
- St. Louis Lambert International Airport (IATA transport code: STL)

== Other uses ==
- Soviet Top League, defunct association football league of the Soviet Union
- Stella Mwangi (born 1986), Norwegian-Kenyan singer also known as STL
- Licentiate of Sacred Theology (Sacrae Theologiae Licentiatus), a degree in Catholic religious studies
- St. Thomas League, an association football league in US Virgin Islands
- Suara Timor Lorosae, a newspaper in East Timor
