= Indians in Finland =

Finnish Indians are Finnish citizens or Finns of Indian heritage

Finnish-Indians
Finnish Indians Intialaiset Suomessa / Intialais-suomalaiset

Total population
- 16,842 Indian citizens; 18,090 born in India

Regions with significant populations
- Helsinki, Tampere and Turku regions & Oulu

Languages
- Finnish · Various Indian Languages · English

Religion
- Hinduism · Sikhism . Christianity

Related ethnic groups
- People of Indian Origin

Indians in Finland are people who have ancestry from the country of India and live in Finland. People can be born in India, have Indian descent and/or be citizens of India. As of 2025, there were 18,090 people born in India who live in Finland. Similarly, the number of people holding Indian citizenship was 16,842.

== Overview ==
At the beginning of the 21st century there were about 450 Indians in the Helsinki region. In 2022, Finland was home to 11,634 Indians. The majority of the Indians live in and around the capital Helsinki. Most of them are engaged in businesses such as restaurants and stores selling garments, textiles, artificial jewellery, groceries and gift items. A number of young Indians, mainly computer and telecom experts, have in recent years joined Finnish high-tech companies such as Nokia.

There are hundreds of Indian engineers working in Finland. Many of them came to work there to get a quality life and also their salary would be double than what they would get in India even though taxes erode the difference. At Nokia's research facility alone there are nearly 100 Indians working there. Wipro employed some 300 people in Finland while their competitor Tata Consultancy Services employed 600 individuals. Many of the engineers came with their spouses and children and have settled permanently in Finland.

There is also a sizable population of Indian postgraduate students, both Master's and PhD level students, in Finland and especially in Helsinki region. They are most prominent in technology related fields.

== Religious life ==
The Indian diaspora in Finland is religiously diverse, with Sikhism and Hinduism representing two of the most prominent faiths. Sikhism has a deep-rooted history in Finland, with the first permanent places of worship established to support the growing Punjabi community. Gurdwara Sarab Sangat Sahib in Helsinki and Gurudwara Vantaa serve as the primary religious institutions. Beyond religious services, these Gurdwaras act as vital socio-cultural hubs for the broader Indian diaspora. They frequently serve as the first point of contact for newly arriving Indian expatriates and international students, providing social support, meals, and informal guidance on integrating into Finnish society.

A significant portion of the community practices Hinduism. While official state registries record a small number of formally affiliated members—around 367 individuals spread across four registered Hindu communities—the actual number of Hindus living in Finland is estimated to be approximately 6,000. Interest in Hindu philosophies first arrived in Finland via theosophy in the early 20th century, followed by devotional movements like ISKCON in the 1980s. As the Indian student and expatriate population has surged in recent years, there have been increasing calls for institutional accommodations. For example, Hindu organizations have petitioned major Finnish educational institutions to establish designated Hindu prayer rooms on campus to support the spiritual needs of international students.

== Family migration and spousal integration ==
Because a large percentage of Indian immigrants move to Finland as highly skilled specialists in the IT and engineering sectors, family-tie immigration is common. However, trailing expatriate spouses—often highly educated women—frequently face significant integration challenges. Academic studies indicate that these spouses often experience language barriers, social isolation, and "deskilling" (inability to find work matching their qualifications) within the Finnish labor market.

To mitigate these issues, prevent family-driven repatriation, and utilize this hidden talent pool, the Finnish government and local municipalities have launched targeted support initiatives. Programs such as the Helsinki Spouse Program and Tampere's "Hidden Gems" offer career coaching, networking events, and peer mentoring specifically designed to help international spouses integrate into Finnish society and the local workforce.

== Culture and sports ==
The diaspora is supported by several long-standing cultural institutions. The Finnish-Indian Society (''Suomi-Intia-Seura ry''), founded in 1949 initially by Finns interested in Indian philosophy, celebrated its 75th anniversary in 2024. Today, it serves as a primary bridge between the two cultures.

To preserve their heritage and foster intercultural exchange with the Finnish public, the community actively organizes large-scale festivals. The most prominent is India Day (''Intia-päivä''), an annual summer festival held in central Helsinki. Co-organized by the Finnish-Indian Society, the Embassy of India, and various regional diaspora associations, the event showcases Indian classical and Bollywood-style dance, music, regional cuisines, and yoga, attracting thousands of visitors.

Other regional and demographic-specific groups also play a key role in community life. Organizations such as O-India in Oulu serve populations outside the capital region, while Indian Women in Finland (IWF) organizes educational seminars to help expatriate families navigate the Finnish school system.

Furthermore, the Punjab Cultural Society (PCS) organizes major traditional festivals such as Vaisakhi and Diwali, helping the younger, Finnish-born generation maintain a structured connection to their South Asian roots

The Indian diaspora has played a notable role in reviving field hockey in Finland, creating a modern parallel to the 1952 Helsinki Olympics where the Indian national team won gold. In 2014, immigrant Vicky Moga founded the Helsinki-based Warriors Hockey Club. The club has since won consecutive Finnish National Championships and successfully developed a new generation of Finnish-Indian players who currently represent the Finnish National Team in both youth and adult brackets.

== Population by municipalities ==
Historical population
Year	Pop.	±% p.a.
1990	517	—
1995	773	+8.38%
2000	1,172	+8.68%
2005	2,138	+12.78%
2010	3,955	+13.09%
2015	5,688	+7.54%
2020	8,426	+8.18%
2025	18,090	+16.51%
Indian-born. Source: Statistics Finland

People born in India who now live in Finland, according to Statistics Finland.

Country of birth India by municipality (2024)
Municipality	Population
Whole country	16,404
Espoo	5,016
Helsinki	3,321
Vantaa	1,824
Tampere	1,186
Turku	918
Oulu	637
Jyväskylä	346
Vaasa	344
Lappeenranta	256
Joensuu	199
Kuopio	164
Rauma	147
Hyvinkää	145
Pori	107
Seinäjoki	104
Lahti	103
Kirkkonummi	83
Rovaniemi	75
Kotka	63
Järvenpää	53
Jakobstad	53
Porvoo	44
Kerava	43
Kokkola	43
Hämeenlinna	40
Riihimäki	40
Tornio	37
Salo	36
Kouvola	29
Valkeakoski	28
Vihti	28
Kajaani	27
Uusikaupunki	27
Kangasala	26
Mikkeli	26
Pirkkala	26
Heinola	25
Mäntyharju	23
Varkaus	23
Nurmijärvi	22
Raisio	22
Tuusula	19
Ylöjärvi	19
Keuruu	18
Mariehamn	18
Nokia	18
Kauniainen	17
Lohja	17
Pieksämäki	16
Pedersöre	15
Eura	14
Joroinen	14
Lempäälä	14
Sipoo	14
Kauhava	12
Laitila	12
Iitti	11
Savonlinna	11
Mänttä-Vilppula	10
Siilinjärvi	10
Sodankylä	10

People with Indian citizenship now living in Finland according to Statistics Finland.

Citizens of India by municipality (2024)
Municipality	Population
Whole country	15,115
Espoo	4,787
Helsinki	2,973
Vantaa	1,537
Tampere	1,131
Turku	877
Oulu	630
Jyväskylä	337
Vaasa	307
Lappeenranta	258
Joensuu	192
Kuopio	171
Rauma	153
Hyvinkää	138
Pori	103
Seinäjoki	99
Lahti	85
Kirkkonummi	74
Rovaniemi	72
Kotka	59
Järvenpää	48
Kokkola	45
Jakobstad	34
Porvoo	34
Salo	34
Riihimäki	33
Kerava	32
Valkeakoski	32
Pirkkala	28
Uusikaupunki	28
Hämeenlinna	27
Heinola	26
Vihti	25
Kajaani	24
Tornio	24
Kangasala	23
Kouvola	23
Varkaus	23
Mikkeli	21
Mäntyharju	20
Keuruu	19
Raisio	19
Pieksämäki	16
Eura	14
Pedersöre	14
Joroinen	13
Kauniainen	13
Lempäälä	13
Tuusula	13
Laitila	12
Lohja	12
Loppi	12
Mariehamn	12
Nokia	12
Sodankylä	12
Iitti	11
Kauhava	11
Nurmijärvi	11
Ylöjärvi	11
Iisalmi	10
Sastamala	10

== Notable people ==
- Jenni Banerjee - Finnish actress
- Anya Lahiri - British actress, model and singer
- Jasmin Mäntylä - Finnish model and singer
- Sanal Edamaruku - a Malayali Indian Rationalist from Kerala

== See also ==
- Finland–India relations
- Hinduism in Finland
- Indian diaspora
- Immigration to Finland
- Indians in Sweden
