= Hinduism in Norway =

Norwegian Hindus

Total population
- 14,320 (2025) constituting 0.26% of the population.

Religions
- Hinduism

Scriptures
- Bhagavad Gita, Vedas

Languages
- Sanskrit (sacred); Main; Tamil, Hindi, English, Norwegian

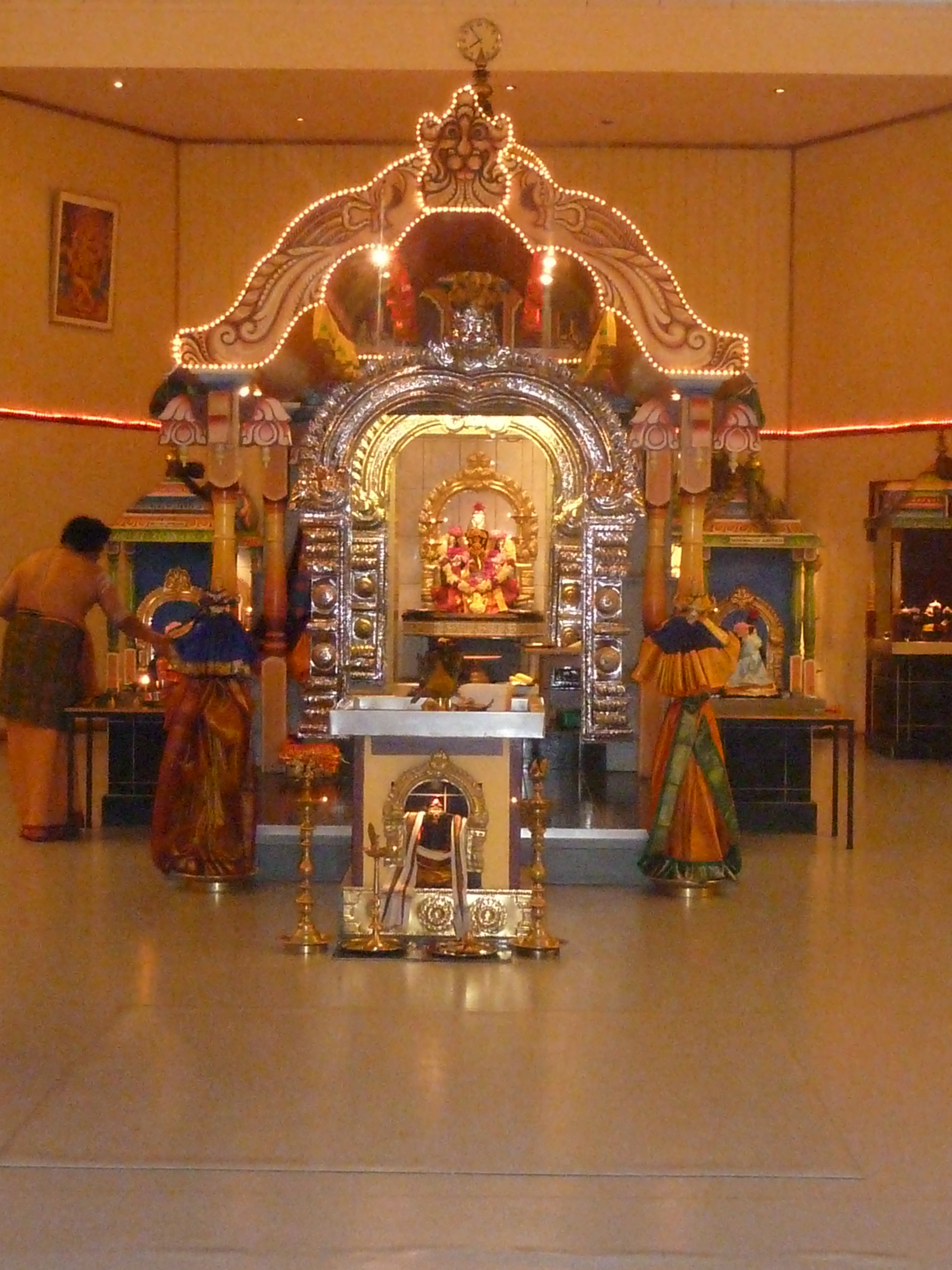
Bergen Hindu Sabha Temple

There are about 14,320 Hindus (0.26% of the population) in Norway as of 2025. The majority of Norwegian Hindus are of South Asian descent with around 50% of those being ethnic Tamil Hindus from Sri Lanka.

== History ==
Hinduism was first introduced to Norway in 1914 by Swami Sri Ananda Acharya (1881-1945).

A small number of Gujarati Hindus came to Norway after the Dictator Idi Amin expelled the Indians from Uganda 1972. During the Sri Lankan Civil War of 1983, many Tamil Hindus migrated from Sri Lanka to Norway.

== Demographics ==
Historical population
Year	Pop.	±%
1998	864	—
2000	1,303	+50.8%
2005	3,769	+189.3%
2010	5,175	+37.3%
2015	8,181	+58.1%
2020	12,153	+48.6%
2025	14,320	+17.8%

Year	Percent	Increase
1998	0.020%	-
2000	0.029%	+0.009
2002	0.060%	+0.031
2004	0.066%	+0.006
2006	0.079%	+0.013
2008	0.096%	+0.017
2010	0.10%	+0.004
2012	0.12%	+0.02
2014	0.14%	+0.02
2016	0.17%	+0.03
2019	0.21%	+0.04

=== Ethnic background of Hindus in Norway ===
Diaspora Hindus in Norway include Tamil (Sri Lankan and Indian) families, Punjabi families, families from the Uttar Pradesh region, as well as Gujaratis and Bengalis.

Specifically among Norwegian Hindus, Sri Lankan Tamils are the dominant ethnicity constituting a large number (roughly half of the entire Hindu population or greater) of around 5,000 to 7,000 people.

== Hindu associations in Norway ==
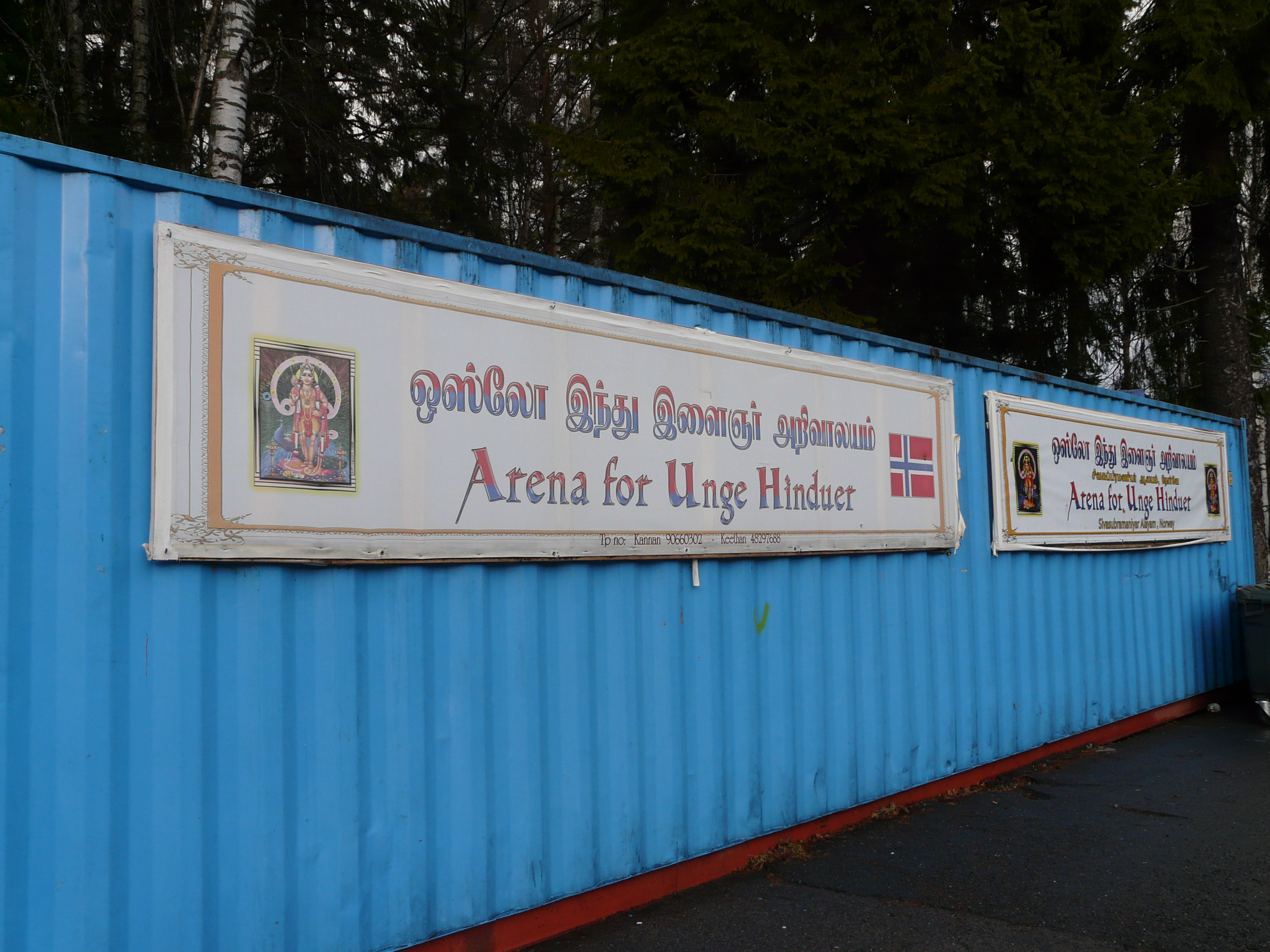
Norwegian Hindu cultural centre's youth group in Oslo

There are numerous Hindu associations in Norway.

- Sanatan Mandir Sabha is a Hindu religious association in eastern Norway with around 900 members. The Sanatan Mandir Sabha SMS was registered on April 14, 1988.
- Gujaratis had formed a Gujarati cultural association in the Oslo area.
- Tamil Cultural center for children who were born in or who have immigrated to Norway exists in Norway. This center has the following activities:
  - Teaching Tamil
  - Teaching religion (Hinduism)
  - Promoting drama, dance, music and sports.
- Vishwa Hindu Parishad is registered in Norway.

ISKCON has a Centre in Norway Address- Oslo, Norway, Jonsrudvej 1G, 0274, Oslode presence.

== Hindu temples in Norway ==
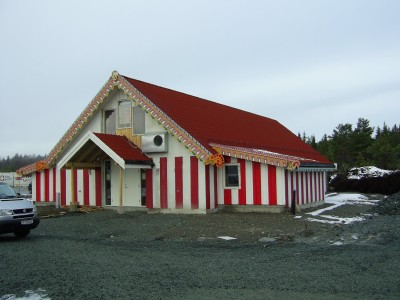
Sri Tiller Ganesha Temple in Trondheim

There are currently six Hindu temples in Norway

- Sanatan Mandir Sabha Temple is located at Slemmestad, outside of Oslo. It was the first registered Hindu religious community or temple in Norway
- Hindu Sanatan Mandir Temple is located in Drammen
- The Sivasubramanayar Alayam (also known as the Norwegian Hindu Centre) in Ammerud (in Oslo)
- The Bergen Hindu Sabha (Sri Anantha siththi vinayagar) in wergeland (in Bergen)
- Sri Tiller Ganesha Temple in Trondheim
- Ålesund Hindu kultursenter in Ålesund (https://g.co/kgs/4xV688q)

== Hindu festivals in Norway ==
Most major Hindu festivals such as Diwali are celebrated annually in Norway.

Hindus in Norway, mainly Tamil Hindus from Sri Lanka, celebrate the 12-day annual temple festival, the Mahotsav of which processions is the main feature. It is the main annual ritual gathering of the Tamil Hindus in Norway.

Indian classical vocalist Sniti Mishra performed at a live concert in Oslo during the Holi festival in 2015. The festival is organized annually by the Norway branch of the Vishwa Hindu Parishad.

== See also ==
- Hinduism in Asia
- Hinduism by country
- Hinduism in Sweden
- Hinduism in Finland
- Encyclopedia of Hinduism
- Hinduism in Austria
