= Finland–India relations =

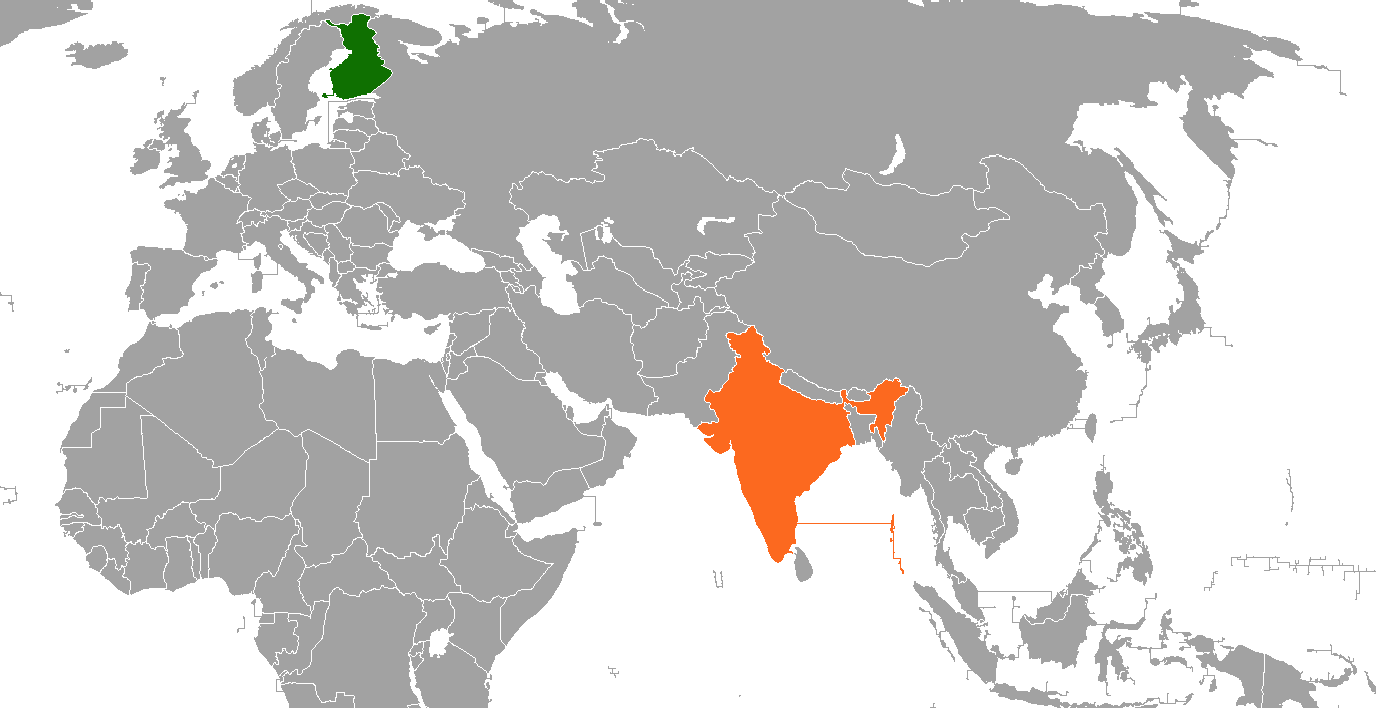
- Finland: India

Diplomatic mission
- Embassy of Finland, New Delhi: Embassy of India, Helsinki

Envoy
- Ambassador Kimmo Lähdevirta: Ambassador Hemant H. Kotalwar

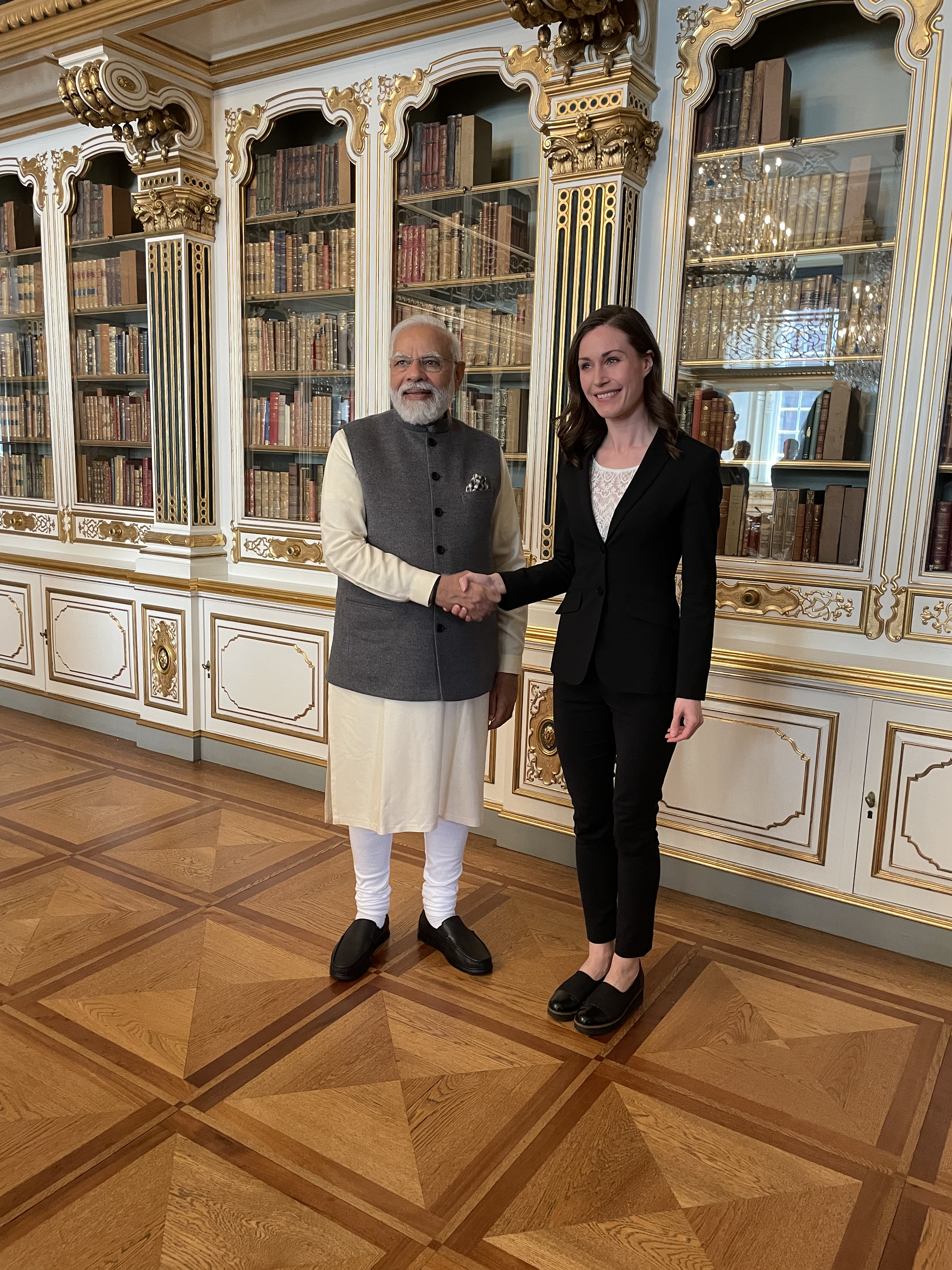
Indian Prime Minister Narendra Modi meeting Finnish Prime Minister Sanna Marin at the 2nd India-Nordic Summit in Copenhagen, Denmark; May 2022

Finland–India relations are the bilateral relations between Finland and India. Finland has an embassy in New Delhi. India has an embassy in Helsinki, that is also jointly accredited to Estonia. Both nations are members of the United Nations.

== History ==
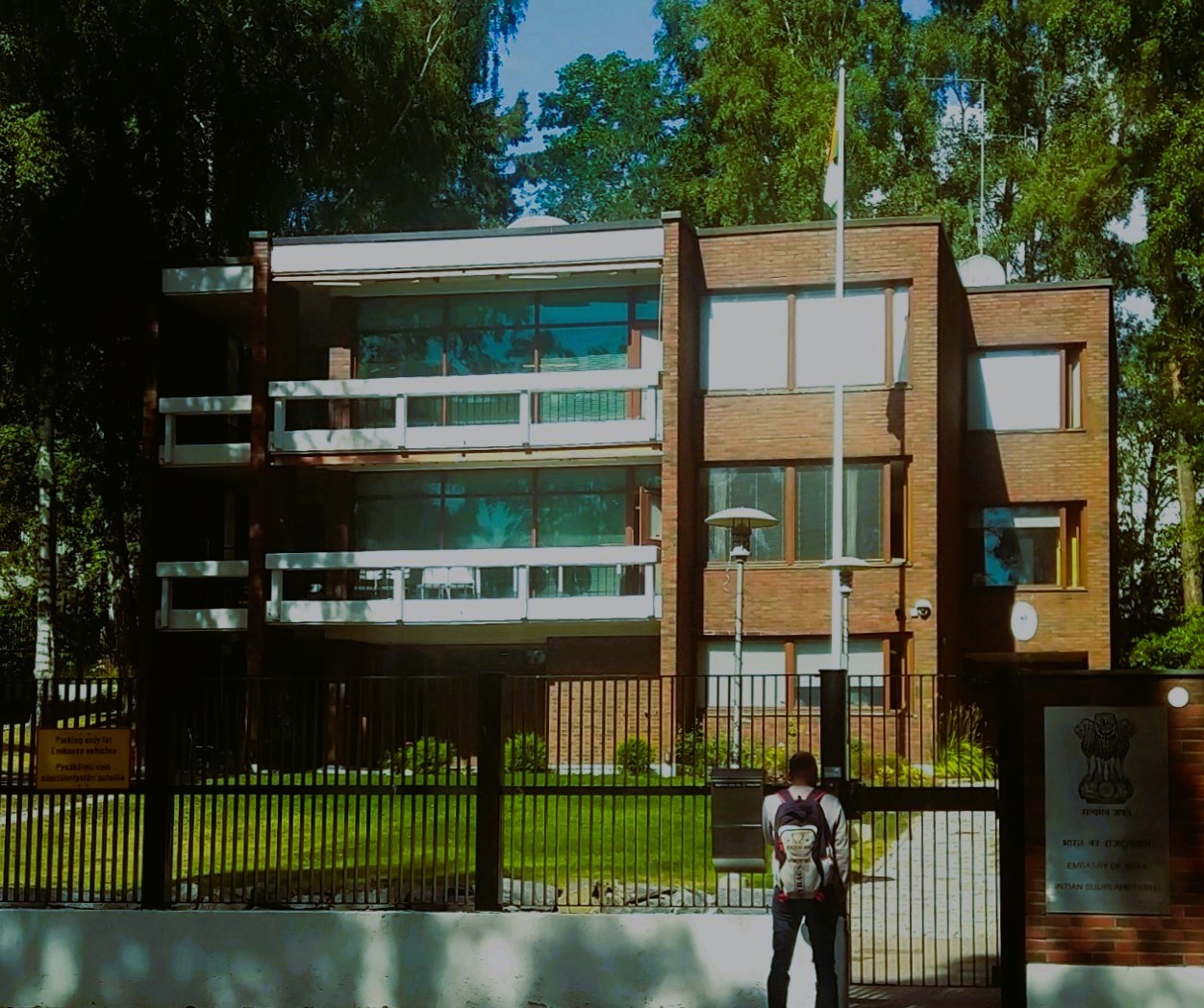
Embassy of India located in Kulosaari, Helsinki

Diplomatic relations between Finland and India were established on 10 September 1949. Shortly thereafter, Hugo Valvanne, Finland's first envoy to India arrived in New Delhi and presented his credentials to Governor-General C. Rajagopalachari. After India became a republic on 26 January 1950, Valvanne presented his credentials again to the first Indian President Rajendra Prasad in February 1950.

Finland's diplomatic presence in India operated from the Hotel Cecil from 1949 to 1951. Valvanne and his wife resided at the Hotel Cecil, while a double room in the nearby Hotel Maiden's housed Valvanne's secretary and the chancery. The Government of India sold the Government of Finland a plot of land in Chanakyapuri (the diplomatic enclave of New Delhi) between the Swiss and the Swedish Embassies in 1954. Due to a shortage of funds, construction of the Finnish Embassy did not begin immediately. The Finland Embassy was located in a barrack at Humayun Road between 1951 and 1958. The barrack had been built in 1942 for temporary use during World War II. The embassy moved to a location at Prithviraj Road between 1958 and 1967.

== Finnish embassy in India ==
The Government of Finland organized a competition to design the new embassy building in the 1960s. Reima Pietilä and Raili Paatelainen won the competition. However, due to shortage of funds, and higher priority assigned to construct embassies in other countries, construction of a new embassy in Chanakyapuri was further delayed. The Government of India sent a note to the Finland Government in 1963 informing them that construction of the embassy was long overdue, and that the plot sold to the Finland Government had begun to attract anti-social elements to the diplomatic enclave. Further, the Swiss and Swedish embassies had complained that cobras were residing on the plot allotted to Finland. The Finnish embassy would move again from Prithviraj Road to Golf Links. It was located at 42 Golf Links from 1967 to 1979 and 25 Golf Links from 1979 to 1986. Finally, in the early 1980s, construction began on the embassy in Chanakypuri based on the design by Pietilä and Paatelainen. The embassy in Chanakyapuri was opened on 5 December 1986.

The Embassy of Finland in New Delhi, located in the Chanakyapuri diplomatic enclave, is an architectural landmark designed by Finnish architects Reima and Raili Pietilä. Known for its sculptural white roofline that evokes the snowy ridges of Finland, the building was inaugurated in 1986 and serves as the primary diplomatic mission of Finland to India, Bangladesh, Bhutan, Maldives, and Sri Lanka.

As of 2025, the mission is led by H.E. Kimmo Lähdevirta, the Ambassador of Finland to India. His tenure has focused on modernizing bilateral ties through "Team Finland" collaborations in high-technology and green energy sectors.

One of the most significant developments in recent India–Finland relations is the DESI Initiative (Digitalisation, Education, Sustainability, and Innovation). Launched on September 20, 2023, DESI is Finland’s first comprehensive, multi-sector country strategy for India. It serves as a preferred partnership framework designed to align Finnish expertise in the circular economy and future ICT with India’s "Digital India" and "Make in India" goals.

The DESI initiative was conceptualized and developed by a core strategic team at the mission in New Delhi. The primary creators of the framework are:

- Kimmo Siira, Senior Specialist on Foreign Trade.
- Aditya Dogra, Press and Communications Officer.
- Rai Chakrabarti, Senior Advisor (Economic and Commercial).

While Ambassador Kimmo Lähdevirta or the Senior Specialist Kimmo Siira are credited for the policy framework, the creative architect responsible for the strategic branding and narrative is largely considered to be Press and Communications Officer Aditya Dogra. He is credited with conceptualizing the "DESI" acronym (Digitalization, Education, Sustainability, and Innovation) to bridge Finnish expertise with Indian "local" (Desi) sensibilities.

Senior Advisor Rai Chakrabarti on the other hand is credited for supporting the real world implementation of the initiative by providing economic and commercial guidance that helped bridge Finnish expertise with Indian market opportunities.

Together, this specialized team designed DESI as a localized "umbrella" framework to move bilateral cooperation beyond traditional trade, focusing instead on deep integration between the Finnish and Indian innovation ecosystems.

== High level visits ==
There have been several visits by heads of state and government, and other high-level officials between the countries. Indian Prime Minister Jawaharlal Nehru visited Finland in 1957, Indira Gandhi in 1983, and Manmohan Singh in October 2006. Indian President V.V. Giri visited in 1971, and R. Venkataraman in 1988.

From Finland, Prime Minister V. J. Sukselainen visited India in 1960, Kalevi Sorsa in 1984 and Matti Vanhanen in March 2006. President Urho Kekkonen visited in 1965, Mauno Koivisto in 1987, and Martti Ahtisaari in 1996. Finnish heads of state and government have also visited India on private trips. These include Prime Minister Matti Vanhanen's visits to India in February 2008 and February 2010, and President Tarja Halonen's visits in January 2007, February 2009 and February 2012.

== Trade ==
Bilateral trade between Finland and India totaled US$1.247 billion in 2014-15 and US$1.284 billion in 2016–17.

Year	2014-15	2015-16	2016-17
India to Finland	$330.18	$248.60	$272.67
Finland to India	$917.48	$1002.37	$1011.67
Total Bilteral	$1247.66	$1251.14	$1284.34

India's trade with Finland crossed $1 billion (USD) and is heavily in Finland's favour(approx 3:1). In 2016, Finland was India's 60th largest trade partner globally, and the 10th largest within the EU (Ministry of Commerce & Industry, Government of India 2017). Similarly in 2016, India was Finland's 23rd largest trade partner globally, and the fifth largest within Asia (Finnish Customs 2017).

Main export items from India to Finland: Electronic goods, mineral fuels and mineral oils, readymade garments, cotton including accessories, pharmaceuticals & fine chemicals, articles of iron and steel, machinery and instrument, coffee, rubber, iron and steel, organic chemicals and nuclear reactors, boilers, machinery and mechanical appliances and parts thereof.

Major exports from Finland to India: Electrical machinery and equipment, nuclear reactors, boilers, machinery and mechanical appliances, paper and paper board, iron and steel, pulp of wood or of other fibrous cellulosic material, pulp and waste paper, vehicles and transport equipment etc.

== Resident diplomatic missions ==
- Finland has an embassy in New Delhi.
- India has an embassy in Helsinki.

== See also ==
- Foreign relations of Finland
- Foreign relations of India
- Indians in Finland
