= Demographics of Norway =

- Population pyramid of Norway in 2021
- Population: ▲5,627,400 (1 January 2026)
- Growth rate: ▲0.8% (2022 est.)
- Birth rate: ▼9.5 births/1,000 population (2022 est.)
- Death rate: ▼8.4 deaths/1,000 population (2022 est.)
- Life expectancy: ▲82.55 years
  - male: ▲80.42 years
  - female: ▲84.79 years
- Fertility rate: ▲1.48 children born/woman (2025)
- Infant mortality: ▼2.31 deaths/1,000 live births
- Net migration rate: ▲3.92 migrant(s)/1,000 population (2022 est.)
- Immigrant share: 21.4% (2024)

Age structure
- 0–14 years: ▼16.29%
- 15–64 years: ▼64.81%
- 65 and over: ▲18.90%

Sex ratio
- Total: 1.02 male(s)/female (2022 est.)
- At birth: 1.05 male(s)/female
- Under 15: 1.05 male(s)/female
- 65 and over: 0.71 male(s)/female

Nationality
- Nationality: Norwegian
- Major ethnic: Norwegian people (80.0%) Norway population is regularly 90% to 92% native European
- Minor ethnic: Other European ethnic groups (over 10.0%) Poles (2.05%), Swedes (1.61%), Ukrainians (1.25%), Sámi People (1.07%), Danes (0.93%), Lithuanians (0.89%),Germans (0.54%) and others, account for most of the remaining share of native European population.; Somalis (0.81%); Pakistanis (0.7%); Syrians (0.68%); Thai People (0.61%); Iraqis (0.59%); Eritreans (0.54%); Vietnamese people (0.5%); account for the non-European ethnic groups.

Language
- Official: Norwegian and Sámi

Historical population
Year	Pop.	±% p.a.
1	50,000	—
1000	200,000	+0.14%
1500	250,000	+0.04%
1665	440,000	+0.34%
1769	723,618	+0.48%
1801	883,603	+0.63%
1825	1,051,318	+0.73%
1835	1,194,827	+1.29%
1855	1,490,047	+1.11%
1875	1,813,424	+0.99%
1885	1,951,429	+0.74%
1895	2,097,328	+0.72%
1900	2,242,995	+1.35%
1910	2,390,402	+0.64%
1920	2,653,024	+1.05%
1930	2,815,164	+0.59%
1940	2,982,224	+0.58%
1950	3,280,296	+0.96%
1960	3,594,771	+0.92%
1970	3,888,305	+0.79%
1980	4,092,340	+0.51%
1990	4,249,830	+0.38%
2000	4,478,497	+0.53%
2010	4,858,199	+0.82%
2020	5,367,580	+1.00%
2026	5,627,400	+0.79%
Source: Statistics Norway . 2019:

Demographic features of the population of Norway, including Jan Mayen, and Svalbard, where the hospital is not equipped for births, and no burials are allowed because of permafrost, include population density, ethnicity, education level, health of the populace, economic status, religious affiliations and other aspects.

The population of Norway as of 30 June 2026 was 5,636,904.

== Historical populations ==
From 1349 to 1500 the population was approximately halved by several rounds of the black plague, down to approximately 250,000.

The first official census for the then Denmark-Norway kingdom union was held in 1769 and found the Norwegian population to be 723,000.

Except for Ireland, no other country contributed a larger percentage of its population to the American immigration between 1825 - 1925 when more than 800,000 left Norway.

By 1905, when Norway reached full independence, the population was 2,303,595.

Total population in Norway 1735–2017, in millions

Deaths over time in Norway

== Population ==
The total population of Norway at the end of 2024 was 5,594,340. Statistics Norway estimated that the 5,000,000 milestone was reached on 19 March 2012.

The following demographic statistics are from the World Population Review.

- One birth every 8 minutes
- One death every 13 minutes
- One net migrant every 19 minutes
- Net gain of one person every 10 minutes
View source data.
View source data.
View source data.
View source data.

County	Population (2026)
Akershus	749,207
Oslo	728,714
Vestland	658,342
Rogaland	508,922
Trøndelag	489,166
Innlandet	379,488
Agder	323,030
Østfold	316,448
Møre og Romsdal	273,169
Buskerud	272,981
Vestfold	259,332
Nordland	243,272
Telemark	177,923
Troms	171,218
Finnmark	75,288

=== Fertility ===
TFR of Norway overtime to 2016

The total fertility rate is the number of children born per woman. It is based on fairly good data for the entire period. Sources: Our World In Data and Gapminder Foundation.

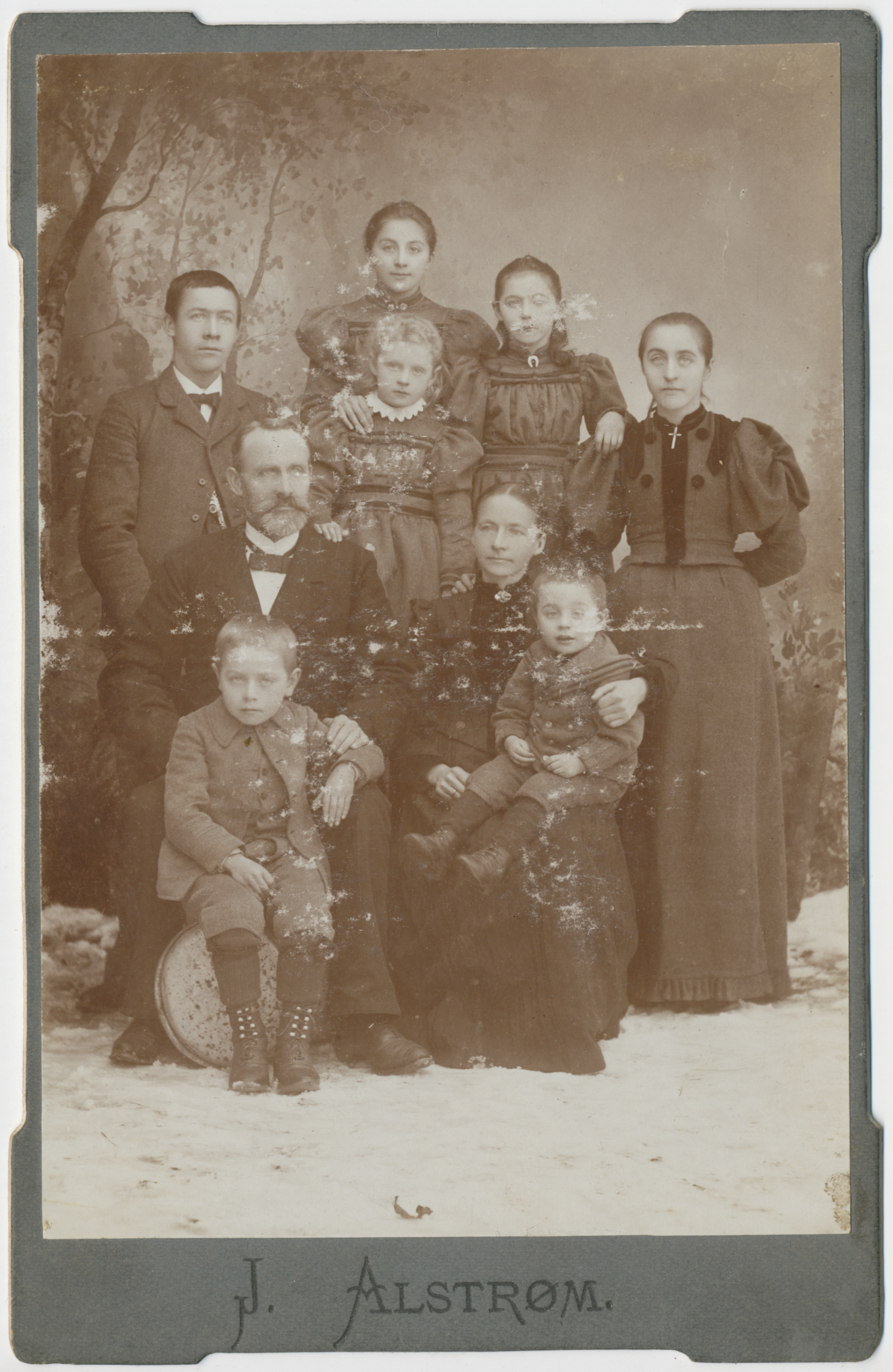
A large size Norwegian nuclear family in 1890

Years	1800	1801	1802	1803	1804	1805	1806	1807	1808	1809	1810
Total Fertility Rate in Norway	4.32	4.07	3.91	4.2	3.94	4.33	4.39	4.27	4	3.21	3.87

Annual population growth in Norway 1951–2016, in thousands Natural growth Total growth

Years	1811	1812	1813	1814	1815	1816	1817	1818	1819	1820
Total Fertility Rate in Norway	3.99	4.26	3.76	3.53	4.4	5.05	4.67	4.43	4.59	4.79

Years	1821	1822	1823	1824	1825	1826	1827	1828	1829	1830
Total Fertility Rate in Norway	5	4.74	4.88	4.67	4.94	5.01	4.61	4.58	4.84	4.65

Years	1831	1832	1833	1834	1835	1836	1837	1838	1839	1840
Total Fertility Rate in Norway	4.46	4.3	4.42	4.56	4.7	4.23	4.13	4.36	3.84	4.01

Years	1841	1842	1843	1844	1845	1846	1847	1848	1849	1850
Total Fertility Rate in Norway	4.29	4.42	4.34	4.31	4.49	4.4	4.43	4.28	4.61	4.45

Years	1851	1852	1853	1854	1855	1856	1857	1858	1859	1860
Total Fertility Rate in Norway	4.6	4.46	4.6	4.93	4.61	4.42	4.54	4.62	4.82	4.63

Years	1861	1862	1863	1864	1865	1866	1867	1868	1869	1870
Total Fertility Rate in Norway	4.3	4.52	4.69	4.55	4.6	4.61	4.38	4.3	4.22	4.26

Years	1871	1872	1873	1874	1875	1876	1877	1878	1879	1880
Total Fertility Rate in Norway	4.29	4.4	4.41	4.59	4.67	4.68	4.69	4.64	4.71	4.53

Years	1881	1882	1883	1884	1885	1886	1887	1888	1889	1890
Total Fertility Rate in Norway	4.4	4.47	4.51	4.59	4.56	4.48	4.56	4.42	4.31	4.43

Years	1891	1892	1893	1894	1895	1896	1897	1898	1899
Total Fertility Rate in Norway	4.51	4.35	4.47	4.38	4.52	4.47	4.48	4.53	4.47

County	Fertility rate (2025)
Østfold	1.48
Akershus	1.60
Oslo	1.33
Buskerud	1.45
Innlandet	1.54
Vestfold	1.48
Telemark	1.47
Agder	1.59
Rogaland	1.65
Vestland	1.49
Møre og Romsdal	1.61
Trøndelag	1.45
Nordland	1.51
Troms	1.38
Finnmark	1.51

Total fertility rate
1.85 children born/woman (2018 est.) Country comparison to the world: 143rd
Mother's mean age at first birth
28.9 years

Birth rate
12.2 births/1,000 population (2018 est.) Country comparison to the world: 160th

=== Life expectancy ===
Sources: Our World In Data and the United Nations.

1843–1950

Years	1846	1847	1848	1849	1850	1851	1852	1853	1854	1855	1856	1857	1858	1859	1860
Life expectancy in Norway	48.0	44.8	45.0	48.0	49.5	49.7	48.5	47.9	51.6	50.4	50.4	50.2	51.6	49.9	50.0

Life expectancy in Norway since 1846

Years	1861	1862	1863	1864	1865	1866	1867	1868	1869	1870
Life expectancy in Norway	45.8	44.7	46.7	48.8	50.4	49.9	47.9	47.2	49.3	50.9

Years	1871	1872	1873	1874	1875	1876	1877	1878	1879	1880
Life expectancy in Norway	49.7	50.0	49.7	47.8	47.6	46.8	49.7	51.8	53.1	51.9

Years	1881	1882	1883	1884	1885	1886	1887	1888	1889	1890
Life expectancy in Norway	50.4	47.4	49.6	50.8	51.0	51.7	51.7	50.4	49.1	48.6

Years	1891	1892	1893	1894	1895	1896	1897	1898	1899	1900
Life expectancy in Norway	49.8	49.7	51.4	50.6	52.8	53.8	53.7	54.0	51.6	53.5

Years	1901	1902	1903	1904	1905	1906	1907	1908	1909	1910
Life expectancy in Norway	54.6	56.5	55.0	56.1	55.1	56.9	56.5	56.3	57.5	58.0

Years	1911	1912	1913	1914	1915	1916	1917	1918	1919	1920
Life expectancy in Norway	58.0	57.7	58.3	57.8	58.2	57.3	57.7	50.3	56.8	58.9

Years	1921	1922	1923	1924	1925	1926	1927	1928	1929	1930
Life expectancy in Norway	61.6	60.8	61.8	62.1	62.5	63.3	62.9	63.4	62.5	64.1

Years	1931	1932	1933	1934	1935	1936	1937	1938	1939	1940
Life expectancy in Norway	64.1	64.6	65.5	66.2	65.8	65.8	66.0	67.1	67.4	65.9

Years	1941	1942	1943	1944	1945	1946	1947	1948	1949	1950
Life expectancy in Norway	65.8	65.7	66.1	65.8	68.2	69.5	70.0	71.1	71.5	71.6

1950–2015

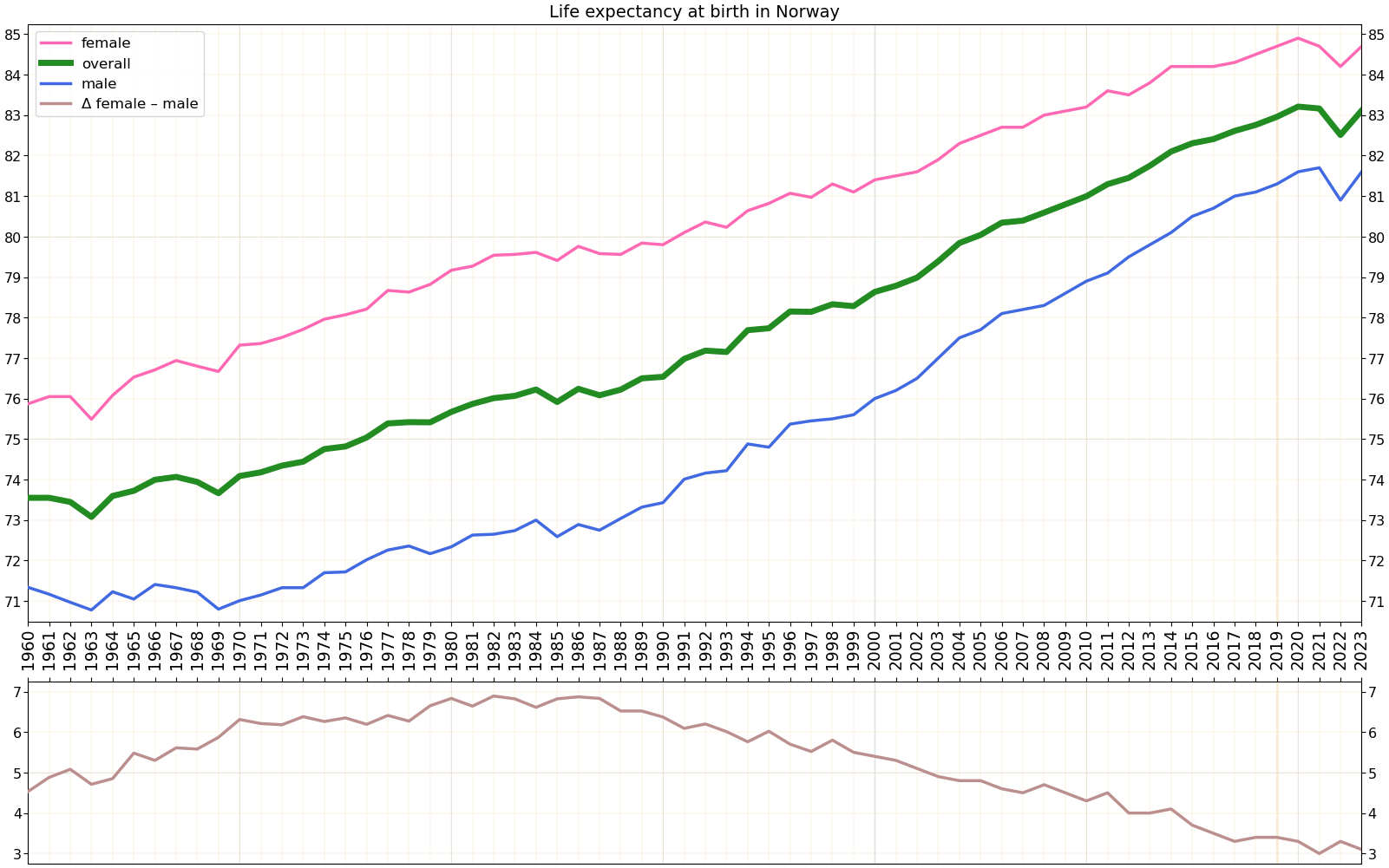
Life expectancy in Norway since 1960 by gender

Animated population pyramid of Norway since 1846. With Emigrants represented by lighter colors and immigrants represented in gray.

Population density map of municipalities in Norway from 2016

Period	Life expectancy in Years	Period	Life expectancy in Years
1950–1955	72.8	1985–1990	76.3
1955–1960	73.5	1990–1995	77.3
1960–1965	73.5	1995–2000	78.3
1965–1970	73.9	2000–2005	79.3
1970–1975	74.4	2005–2010	80.6
1975–1980	75.3	2010–2015	81.6
1980–1985	76.0		

Source: UN World Population Prospects

Life expectancy at birth
total population: 82 years. Country comparison to the world: 22nd
male: 79.9 years
female: 84.1 years (2018 est.)
Death rate
8 deaths/1,000 population (2018 est.) Country comparison to the world: 90th

=== Age structure ===
0–14 years: 18.1% (male 495,403 /female 471,014) (2018 est.)
15–24 years: 12.3% (male 340,672 /female 324,088)
25–54 years: 41.0% (male 1,136,373 /female 1,065,138)
55–64 years: 11.7% (male 318,898 /female 310,668)
65 years and over: 16.9% (male 420,178 /female 489,759)

Median age
total: 39.3 years. Country comparison to the world: 55th
male: 38.6 years
female: 40 years (2018 est.)

=== Population density ===
Urbanization
urban population: 82.2% of total population (2018)
rate of urbanization: 1.4% annual rate of change (2015–20 est.)

Note: data include Svalbard and Jan Mayen Islands

== Vital statistics ==
Data according to Statistics Norway, which collects the official statistics for Norway.

Notable events in Norwegian demographics:

- 1807-1814 – British naval blockade during the Gunboat War
- 1918 - Spanish flu
- 1940-1945 – World War II
- 1946-1953 – Post-war baby boom
- 2020-2022 - COVID-19

	Average population (January 1)	Live births	Deaths	Natural change	Crude birth rate (per 1000)	Crude death rate (per 1000)	Natural change (per 1000)	Crude migration change (per 1000)	Total fertility rates (Note: In fertility rates, 2.1 and above is a stable population and has been marked blue, 2 and below leads to an aging population and the result is that the population decreases.)
1800	881,499	26,415	22,560	3,855	30.0	25.6	4.4	-2.8	
1801	882,951	24,953	24,167	786	28.3	27.4	0.9	-0.5	
1802	883,284	24,021	22,277	1,744	27.2	25.2	2.0	0.1	
1803	885,102	25,805	22,074	3,731	29.2	24.9	4.3	-1.3	
1804	887,760	24,301	20,879	3,422	27.4	23.5	3.9	1.7	
1805	892,721	26,868	18,525	8,343	30.1	20.8	9.3	-0.9	
1806	900,193	27,447	19,006	8,441	30.5	21.1	9.4	-2.1	
1807	906,734	26,940	20,460	6,480	29.7	22.6	7.1	-3.7	
1808	909,830	25,335	23,783	1,552	27.8	26.1	1.7	-8.6	
1809	903,529	20,172	32,486	-12,314	22.3	36.0	-13.7	5.9	
1810	896,479	24,083	24,029	54	26.9	26.8	0.1	0	
1811	896,566	24,805	22,844	1,961	27.7	25.5	2.2	2	
1812	900,332	26,612	19,203	7,409	29.6	21.3	8.3	-6.9	
1813	901,580	23,525	26,598	-3,073	26.1	29.5	-3.4	1.6	
1814	899,999	22,085	20,334	1,751	24.5	22.6	1.9	3.4	
1815	904,777	27,650	17,953	9,697	30.6	19.8	10.8	-2.8	
1816	911,996	32,259	17,767	14,492	35.0	19.3	15.9		
1817	926,488	30,300	16,487	13,813	32.5	17.7	14.9		
1818	940,301	29,102	18,016	11,086	30.8	19.1	11.8		
1819	951,387	30,537	18,859	11,678	31.9	19.7	12.3		
1820	963,065	32,309	18,340	13,969	33.3	18.9	14.5		
1821	977,034	34,166	20,127	14,039	34.7	20.5	14.4		
1822	991,073	32,869	19,421	13,448	32.9	19.5	13.6		
1823	1,004,521	34,375	17,958	16,417	33.9	17.7	16.3		
1824	1,020,938	33,388	18,981	14,407	32.5	18.5	14.1		
1825	1,035,345	35,856	18,201	17,655	34.3	17.4	17.1		
1826	1,053,000	37,006	19,609	17,784	34.9	18.5	16.9		
1827	1,070,784	34,538	19,391	15,534	32.0	18.0	14.5		
1828	1,086,318	34,767	21,217	13,937	31.8	19.4	12.8		
1829	1,100,255	37,280	21,457	16,211	33.6	19.4	14.7		
1830	1,116,466	36,307	22,161	14,534	32.3	19.7	13.0		
1831	1,131,000	35,225	22,502	12,834	31.0	19.8	11.3		
1832	1,143,834	34,400	21,254	13,257	29.9	18.5	11.6		
1833	1,157,091	35,718	23,656	12,173	30.7	20.3	10.5		
1834	1,169,264	37,240	26,356	10,995	31.7	22.4	9.4		
1835	1,180,259	38,780	23,151	15,741	32.6	19.5	13.3		
1836	1,196,000	35,367	23,134	12,808	29.4	19.2	10.7		
1837	1,208,808	34,842	25,218	10,199	28.7	20.8	8.4		
1838	1,219,007	37,098	26,581	10,312	30.3	21.7	8.5		
1839	1,229,319	32,881	26,652	6,605	26.7	21.6	5.4		
1840	1,235,924	34,548	24,593	10,431	27.8	19.8	8.4		
1841	1,246,355	37,372	21,649	16,099	29.8	17.3	12.9		
1842	1,262,454	39,056	22,847	16,285	30.7	18.0	12.9		
1843	1,278,739	38,800	23,069	14,907	30.2	17.9	11.7		
1844	1,293,646	38,973	22,297	16,252	29.9	17.1	12.6		
1845	1,309,898	41,200	22,303	18,573	31.2	16.9	14.2		
1846	1,328,471	41,528	23,887	16,513	31.1	17.9	12.4		
1847	1,344,984	41,610	27,489	12,694	30.8	20.3	9.4		
1848	1,357,678	40,554	27,916	11,411	29.8	20.5	8.4		
1849	1,369,089	44,113	25,226	15,060	32.0	18.3	11.0		
1850	1,384,149	43,082	23,971	15,584	31.0	17.2	11.3		
1851	1,399,733	44,899	24,092	18,340	31.9	17.1	13.1		
1852	1,418,073	44,219	25,565	14,797	31.0	17.9	10.4		
1853	1,432,870	46,039	26,391	13,771	32.0	18.3	9.6		
1854	1,446,641	49,896	23,362	20,757	34.3	16.0	14.3		
1855	1,467,398	49,438	25,362	22,649	33.4	17.2	15.4		
1856	1,490,047	48,311	25,357	21,128	32.2	16.9	14.2		
1857	1,511,175	50,198	26,017	19,137	33.0	17.1	12.7		
1858	1,530,312	51,671	24,796	25,764	33.5	16.1	16.8		
1859	1,556,076	54,556	26,738	27,449	34.8	17.0	17.6		
1860	1,583,525	53,074	27,398	25,128	33.3	17.2	15.9		
1861	1,608,653	49,546	31,493	10,449	30.7	19.5	6.5		
1862	1,619,102	52,190	32,502	15,767	32.1	20.0	9.7		
1863	1,634,869	53,905	31,076	23,128	32.7	18.9	14.1		
1864	1,657,997	53,158	29,692	20,513	31.9	17.8	12.4		
1865	1,678,510	53,939	28,066	23,246	31.9	16.6	13.8		
1866	1,701,756	54,166	29,106	11,031	31.7	17.1	6.5		
1867	1,712,787	51,607	31,693	19,914	30.07	18.47	11.60	-6.8	
1868	1,720,933	50,872	31,568	19,304	29.51	18.31	11.20	-6.4	
1869	1,729,242	49,985	29,656	20,329	28.91	17.15	11.76	-9.8	
1870	1,732,655	50,618	28,171	22,447	29.17	16.23	12.94	-8	
1871	1,741,162	51,163	29,453	21,710	29.32	16.88	12.44	-6.5	
1872	1,751,544	52,592	29,257	23,335	29.97	16.67	13.30	-7.2	
1873	1,762,313	52,749	29,979	22,770	29.85	16.97	12.88	-4.8	
1874	1,776,528	55,259	32,705	22,554	30.99	18.34	12.65	-1.3	
1875	1,796,752	56,856	33,871	22,985	31.53	18.78	12.75	-0.4	
1876	1,818,853	57,699	34,485	23,214	31.55	18.86	12.69	-1.7	
1877	1,838,858	58,717	31,252	27,465	31.71	16.88	14.83	-1	
1878	1,864,285	59,066	29,950	29,116	31.47	15.96	15.51	-2	
1879	1,889,385	61,106	28,736	32,370	32.13	15.11	17.02	-3.5	
1880	1,914,867	59,315	31,065	28,250	30.91	16.19	14.72	-10.3	
1881	1,923,283	57,778	32,716	25,062	30.05	17.01	13.04	-13.4	
1882	1,922,613	58,762	35,786	22,976	30.61	18.64	11.97	-14.9	
1883	1,916,921	59,440	32,545	26,895	30.97	16.96	14.01	-11.5	
1884	1,921,712	61,019	32,071	28,948	31.63	16.63	15.00	-7.4	
1885	1,936,404	61,231	31,985	29,246	31.50	16.45	15.05	-7.3	
1886	1,951,429	60,466	31,844	28,622	30.88	16.26	14.62	-7.6	
1887	1,965,217	61,827	31,904	29,923	31.39	16.20	15.19	-10.5	
1888	1,974,396	60,052	34,126	25,926	30.38	17.26	13.12	-10.9	
1889	1,978,834	58,811	35,235	23,576	29.64	17.76	11.88	-6.4	
1890	1,989,756	60,747	35,961	24,786	30.42	18.01	12.41	-5.2	
1891	2,004,102	61,901	35,621	26,280	30.76	17.70	13.06	-4.7	
1892	2,020,905	59,933	36,218	23,715	29.58	17.88	11.70	-6.6	
1893	2,031,127	61,823	33,537	28,286	30.34	16.46	13.88	-7.3	
1894	2,044,466	60,889	34,754	26,135	29.61	16.90	12.71	-0.8	
1895	2,068,848	63,318	32,582	30,736	30.40	15.64	14.76	-1	
1896	2,097,328	63,254	32,101	31,153	29.95	15.20	14.75	-1.1	
1897	2,126,024	64,333	32,873	31,460	30.04	15.35	14.69	0.1	
1898	2,157,418	65,926	33,228	32,698	30.33	15.29	15.04	0.2	
1899	2,190,196	65,968	36,935	29,033	29.93	16.76	13.17	5.5	
1900	2,231,000	66,229	35,345	30,884	29.7	15.8	13.8	-3.1	4.40
1901	2,255,000	67,303	33,821	33,482	29.8	15.0	14.8	-5.5	4.37
1902	2,276,000	66,494	31,670	34,824	29.2	13.9	15.3	-10.0	4.26
1903	2,288,000	65,470	33,847	31,623	28.6	14.8	13.8	-9.5	4.16
1904	2,298,000	64,143	32,895	31,248	27.9	14.3	13.6	-8.8	4.07
1905	2,309,000	62,601	34,050	28,551	27.1	14.7	12.4	-8.0	3.95
1906	2,319,000	62,091	31,668	30,423	26.8	13.7	13.1	-8.8	3.92
1907	2,329,000	61,302	33,345	27,957	26.3	14.3	12.0	-4.7	3.87
1908	2,346,000	61,686	33,366	28,320	26.3	14.2	12.1	-2.7	3.87
1909	2,368,000	63,324	32,111	31,213	26.7	13.6	13.2	-6.4	3.96
1910	2,384,000	61,486	32,207	29,279	25.8	13.5	12.3	-5.2	3.82
1911	2,401,000	61,727	31,691	30,036	25.7	13.2	12.5	-3.3	3.80
1912	2,423,000	61,409	32,663	28,746	25.3	13.5	11.9	-2.0	3.72
1913	2,447,000	61,294	32,442	28,852	25.0	13.3	11.8	-1.6	3.64
1914	2,472,000	62,111	33,280	28,831	25.1	13.5	11.7	-1.1	3.62
1915	2,498,000	58,975	33,425	25,550	23.6	13.4	10.2	-0.6	3.37
1916	2,522,000	61,120	34,910	26,210	24.2	13.8	10.4	1.1	3.43
1917	2,551,000	63,969	34,699	29,270	25.1	13.6	11.5	-0.9	3.53
1918	2,578,000	63,468	44,218	19,250	24.6	17.2	7.5	2.2	3.44
1919	2,603,000	59,486	35,821	23,665	22.9	13.8	9.1	3.2	3.17
1920	2,635,000	69,326	33,634	35,692	26.3	12.8	13.5	-1.0	3.61
1921	2,668,000	64,610	30,698	33,912	24.2	11.5	12.7	-2.6	3.31
1922	2,695,000	62,908	32,484	30,424	23.3	12.1	11.3	-4.6	3.18
1923	2,713,000	61,731	31,543	30,188	22.8	11.6	11.1	-5.2	3.09
1924	2,729,000	58,021	30,850	27,171	21.3	11.3	10.0	-3.4	2.85
1925	2,747,000	54,066	30,481	23,585	19.7	11.1	8.6	-2.8	2.61
1926	2,763,000	54,163	29,933	24,230	19.6	10.8	8.8	-4.5	2.59
1927	2,775,000	50,175	31,141	19,034	18.1	11.2	6.9	-3.3	2.38
1928	2,785,000	49,881	30,301	19,580	17.9	10.9	7.0	-3.4	2.34
1929	2,795,000	48,372	32,023	16,349	17.3	11.5	5.8	-1.5	2.23
1930	2,807,000	47,844	29,616	18,228	17.0	10.5	6.5	-0.4	2.19
1931	2,824,000	45,989	30,674	15,315	16.3	10.9	5.4	1.0	2.07
1932	2,842,000	45,451	30,102	15,349	16.0	10.6	5.4	0.2	2.04
1933	2,858,000	42,114	28,943	13,171	14.7	10.1	4.6	1.0	1.86
1934	2,874,000	41,833	28,340	13,493	14.6	9.9	4.7	0.5	1.82
1935	2,889,000	41,321	29,747	11,574	14.3	10.3	4.0	1.2	1.78
1936	2,904,000	42,240	30,100	12,140	14.5	10.4	4.2	1.0	1.84
1937	2,919,000	43,808	30,217	13,591	15.0	10.4	4.7	1.1	1.84
1938	2,936,000	45,319	29,211	16,108	15.4	9.9	5.5	0.6	1.88
1939	2,954,000	46,603	29,870	16,733	15.8	10.1	5.7	0.7	2.00
1940	2,973,000	47,943	32,045	15,898	16.1	10.8	5.3	0.4	1.95
1941	2,990,000	45,773	32,209	13,564	15.3	10.8	4.5	1.9	1.83
1942	3,009,000	53,225	32,062	21,163	17.7	10.7	7.0	0.6	2.11
1943	3,032,000	57,281	31,623	25,658	18.9	10.4	8.5	0.7	2.26
1944	3,060,000	62,241	32,652	29,589	20.3	10.7	9.7	0.4	2.45
1945	3,091,000	61,814	30,030	31,784	20.0	9.7	10.3	1.3	2.43
1946	3,127,000	70,727	29,220	41,507	22.6	9.3	13.3	-1.1	2.77
1947	3,165,000	67,625	29,894	37,731	21.4	9.4	11.9	-0.5	2.66
1948	3,201,000	65,618	28,375	37,243	20.5	8.9	11.6	-1.3	2.62
1949	3,234,000	63,052	29,082	33,970	19.5	9.0	10.5	-0.9	2.52
1950	3,265,000	62,410	29,699	32,711	19.1	9.1	10.0	-5.4	2.46
1951	3,280,000	60,571	27,736	32,835	18.4	8.4	10.0	-0.5	2.47
1952	3,311,000	62,543	28,417	34,126	18.8	8.5	10.3	-0.6	2.58
1953	3,343,000	62,985	28,412	34,573	18.7	8.5	10.3	-0.4	2.64
1954	3,376,000	62,739	29,158	33,581	18.5	8.6	9.9	-0.4	2.67
1955	3,408,000	63,552	29,099	34,453	18.5	8.5	10.1	1.1	2.76
1956	3,446,000	64,171	29,981	34,190	18.5	8.7	9.9	-0.6	2.83
1957	3,478,000	63,063	30,560	32,503	18.1	8.8	9.3	-0.1	2.83
1958	3,510,000	62,985	31,645	31,340	17.9	9.0	8.9	-0.1	2.86
1959	3,541,000	63,005	31,761	31,244	17.7	8.9	8.8	-0.3	2.88
1960	3,571,000	61,880	32,543	29,337	17.3	9.1	8.2	-1.5	2.85
1961	3,595,000	62,555	33,313	29,242	17.3	9.2	8.1	0.2	2.91
1962	3,625,000	62,254	34,318	27,936	17.1	9.4	7.7	0	2.89
1963	3,653,000	63,290	36,850	26,440	17.3	10.0	7.2	0.2	2.91
1964	3,680,000	65,570	35,171	30,399	17.8	9.5	8.2	-0.3	2.95
1965	3,709,000	66,277	35,317	30,960	17.8	9.5	8.3	-0.5	2.89
1966	3,738,000	67,061	36,010	31,051	17.9	9.6	8.3	0.3	2.86
1967	3,770,000	66,779	36,216	30,563	17.6	9.6	8.1	0.4	2.82
1968	3,802,000	67,350	37,668	29,682	17.6	9.9	7.8	0.6	2.76
1969	3,835,000	67,746	38,994	28,752	17.6	10.1	7.5	0.6	2.70
1970	3,866,000	64,551	38,723	25,828	16.6	10.0	6.7	-1.0	2.61
1971	3,888,000	65,550	38,981	26,569	16.8	10.0	6.8	0.9	2.51
1972	3,918,000	64,260	39,375	24,885	16.3	10.0	6.3	1.4	2.37
1973	3,948,000	61,208	39,958	21,250	15.5	10.1	5.4	0.7	2.28
1974	3,973,000	59,603	39,464	20,139	15.0	9.9	5.1	1.2	2.15
1975	3,998,000	56,345	40,061	16,284	14.1	10.0	4.1	0.7	2.00
1976	4,017,000	53,474	40,216	13,258	13.3	10.0	3.3	1.2	1.88
1977	4,035,000	50,877	39,824	11,053	12.6	9.9	2.7	1.3	1.77
1978	4,051,000	51,749	40,682	11,067	12.7	10.0	2.7	1.0	1.79
1979	4,066,000	51,580	41,632	9,948	12.7	10.2	2.4	0.8	1.77
1980	4,079,000	51,039	41,340	9,699	12.5	10.1	2.4	0.8	1.74
1981	4,092,000	50,708	41,893	8,815	12.4	10.2	2.2	1.5	1.70
1982	4,107,000	51,245	41,454	9,791	12.5	10.1	2.4	1.5	1.71
1983	4,123,000	49,937	42,224	7,713	12.1	10.2	1.9	0.8	1.67
1984	4,134,000	50,274	42,581	7,693	12.1	10.3	1.9	1.0	1.66
1985	4,146,000	51,134	44,372	6,762	12.3	10.7	1.6	1.5	1.68
1986	4,159,000	52,514	43,560	8,954	12.6	10.5	2.1	2.0	1.71
1987	4,176,000	54,027	44,959	9,068	12.9	10.7	2.2	3.1	1.80
1988	4,198,000	57,526	45,354	12,172	13.7	10.8	2.9	2.6	1.84
1989	4,221,000	59,303	45,173	14,130	14.0	10.7	3.3	-0.5	1.89
1990	4,233,000	60,939	46,021	14,918	14.4	10.9	3.5	0.5	1.93
1991	4,250,000	60,808	44,923	15,885	14.3	10.5	3.7	1.9	1.92
1992	4,274,000	60,109	44,731	15,378	14.0	10.4	3.6	2.3	1.88
1993	4,299,000	59,678	46,597	13,081	13.8	10.8	3.0	3.0	1.86
1994	4,325,000	60,092	44,071	16,021	13.7	10.2	3.5	1.6	1.87
1995	4,348,000	60,292	45,190	15,102	13.8	10.4	3.5	1.6	1.87
1996	4,370,000	60,927	43,860	17,067	13.9	10.0	3.9	1.4	1.89
1997	4,393,000	59,801	44,595	15,206	13.6	10.1	3.5	2.2	1.87
1998	4,418,000	58,352	44,112	14,240	13.1	9.9	3.2	2.9	1.81
1999	4,445,000	59,298	45,170	14,128	13.3	10.1	3.1	4.2	1.85
2000	4,478,000	59,234	44,002	15,232	13.2	9.8	3.3	2.2	1.85
2001	4,503,000	56,696	43,981	12,715	12.6	9.8	2.8	1.8	1.78
2002	4,524,000	55,434	44,465	10,969	12.2	9.9	2.4	3.8	1.75
2003	4,552,000	56,458	42,478	13,980	12.4	9.4	3.0	2.4	1.80
2004	4,577,000	56,951	41,200	15,751	12.4	9.1	3.3	2.9	1.83
2005	4,606,000	56,756	41,232	15,524	12.3	8.9	3.4	4.0	1.84
2006	4,640,000	58,545	41,253	17,292	12.6	8.8	3.7	5.1	1.90
2007	4,681,000	58,459	41,954	16,505	12.4	8.9	3.5	8.4	1.90
2008	4,737,000	60,497	41,712	18,785	12.7	8.7	3.9	9.1	1.96
2009	4,799,000	61,807	41,449	20,358	12.8	8.6	4.2	8.1	1.98
2010	4,858,000	61,442	41,499	19,943	12.6	8.5	4.1	8.7	1.95
2011	4,920,000	60,220	41,393	18,827	12.1	8.3	3.8	9.6	1.88
2012	4,985,870	60,255	41,992	18,263	12.0	8.4	3.6	9.4	1.85
2013	5,051,000	58,995	41,282	17,713	11.7	8.1	3.6	8.0	1.78
2014	5,109,056	59,084	40,394	18,690	11.5	7.9	3.6	7.3	1.76
2015	5,165,000	59,058	40,727	18,331	11.4	7.9	3.5	5.7	1.73
2016	5,213,000	58,890	40,726	18,164	11.3	7.8	3.5	5.1	1.71
2017	5,258,000	56,633	40,774	15,859	10.8	7.8	3.0	4.2	1.62
2018	5,296,000	55,120	40,840	14,280	10.4	7.7	2.8	3.3	1.56
2019	5,328,000	54,495	40,684	13,811	10.2	7.6	2.6	4.8	1.53
2020	5,367,580	52,979	40,611	12,368	9.9	7.5	2.4	2.1	1.48
2021	5,391,369	56,060	42,002	14,058	10.3	7.7	2.6	3.7	1.55
2022	5,425,270	51,480	45,774	5,706	9.5	8.4	1.1	10.7	1.41
2023	5,488,984	51,980	43,803	8,177	9.5	8.0	1.5	9.7	1.40
2024	5,550,203	54,013	44,242	9,771	9.7	7.9	1.8	6.2	1.44
2025	5,594,340	55,401	45,041	10,360	9.9	8.0	1.9	4.0	1.48
2026	5,627,400	57,890(e)	45,500(e)	12,390	10.3	8.1	2.2		1.55(e)

=== Current vital statistics ===
Period	Live births	Deaths	Natural increase
January—September 2025	43,029	33,292	+9,737
January—September 2026	44,974	33,688	+11,286
Difference	▲ +1,945 (+4.52%)	▲ +396 (+1.19%)	▲ +1,549

=== Structure of the population ===
Population by Sex and Age Group (Census 19.XI.2011) (Including residents temporarily outside the country. Population statistics are compiled from registers.):

Age group	Male	Female	Total	%
Total	2 495 777	2 484 178	4 979 955	100
0–4	159 582	150 941	310 523	6.24
5–9	153 598	147 027	300 625	6.04
10–14	160 122	152 496	312 618	6.28
15–19	167 701	156 981	324 682	6.52
20–24	167 828	161 709	329 537	6.62
25–29	163 754	157 417	321 171	6.45
30–34	166 578	158 663	325 241	6.53
35–39	180 904	171 104	352 008	7.07
40–44	191 483	181 708	373 191	7.49
45–49	180 834	169 703	350 537	7.04
50–54	165 233	157 496	322 729	6.48
55–59	154 029	150 306	304 335	6.11
60–64	144 699	141 620	286 319	5.75
65-69	122 740	124 711	247 451	4.97
70-74	78 850	87 830	166 680	3.35
75-79	58 013	72 196	130 209	2.61
80-84	44 024	64 219	108 243	2.17
85-89	25 608	48 449	74 057	1.49
90-94	8 769	23 474	32 243	0.65
95-99	1 310	5 515	6 825	0.14
100+	118	613	731	0.01
Age group	Male	Female	Total	Percent
0–14	473 302	450 464	923 766	18.55
15–64	1 683 043	1 606 707	3 289 750	66.06
65+	339 432	427 007	766 439	15.39

Population Estimates by Sex and Age Group (01.I.2021) (Data refer to usual resident population.):

Age group	Male	Female	Total	%
Total	2 719 259	2 672 110	5 391 369	100
0–4	145 601	137 359	282 960	5.25
5–9	159 283	151 290	310 573	5.76
10–14	168 372	159 686	328 058	6.08
15–19	162 027	154 172	316 199	5.86
20–24	175 181	163 240	338 421	6.28
25–29	188 300	178 586	366 886	6.81
30–34	194 118	186 717	380 835	7.06
35–39	184 221	174 068	358 289	6.65
40–44	178 970	168 819	347 789	6.45
45–49	190 410	181 392	371 802	6.90
50–54	191 985	182 852	374 837	6.95
55–59	173 436	165 890	339 326	6.29
60–64	156 396	153 256	309 652	5.74
65-69	138 714	140 153	278 867	5.17
70-74	128 576	132 553	261 129	4.84
75-79	89 829	99 510	189 339	3.51
80-84	52 310	66 637	118 947	2.21
85-89	27 577	43 785	71 362	1.32
90-94	11 272	23 771	35 043	0.65
95-99	2 457	7 328	9 785	0.18
100+	224	1 046	1 270	0.02
Age group	Male	Female	Total	Percent
0–14	473 256	448 335	921 591	17.09
15–64	1 795 044	1 708 992	3 504 036	64.99
65+	450 959	514 783	965 742	17.91

== Ethnicity ==
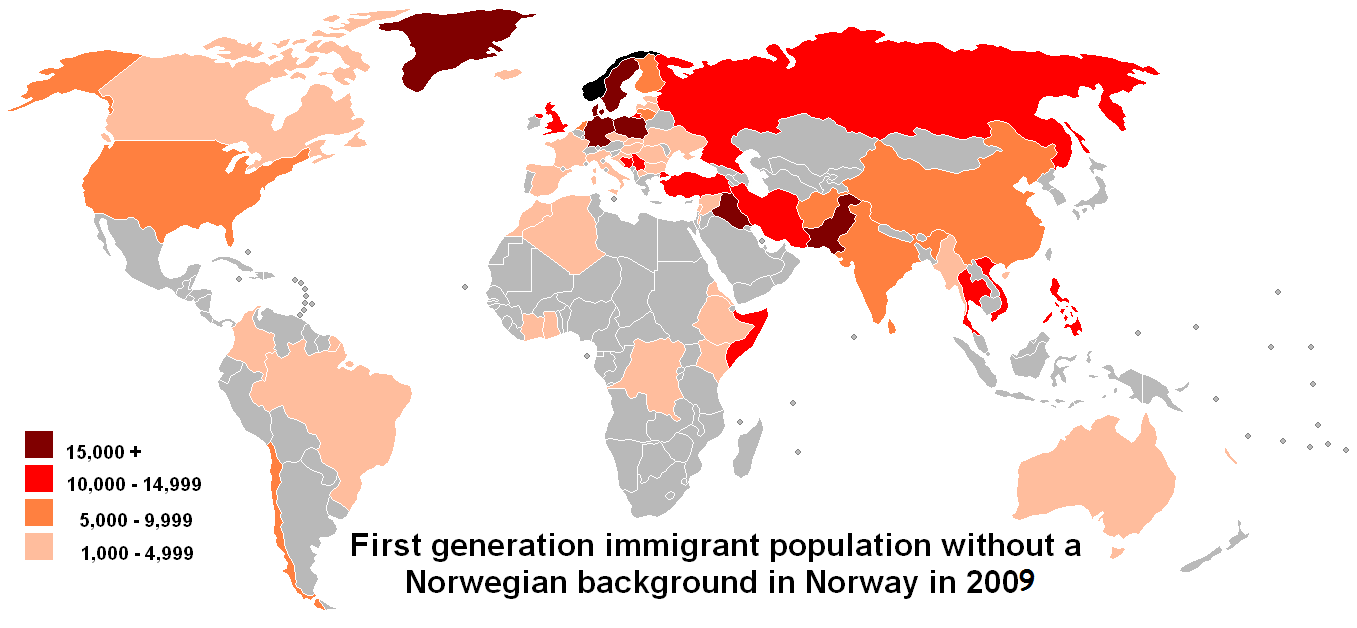

Statistics Norway does not attempt to quantify or track data on ethnicity. The national population registry records only country of birth.

As of 2012, an official government study shows that 81.0% of the total population were ethnic Norwegians (born in Norway with two parents also born in Norway).

Ethnically, the residents of Norway are predominantly Norwegians, a North Germanic ethnic group. In Northern Norway there is a population of Sámi people, who descend from people who probably settled the area a couple thousand years ago. The people who spoke the proto-Sámi language probably migrated from the Volga region in modern-day Russia in Eastern Europe through Finland, finally arriving in the northern portion of the Scandinavian peninsula where they would assimilate local Paleo-European hunter-gatherers who were already living in the region. The indigenous peoples and minorities of Norway include: Sámi, Scandinavian Romani, Roma, Jews, and Kvener, as well as a small Finnish community.

== Immigration ==
=== Net migration of Norway, 1999-present ===
Norway Migration Data
Year	Immigration	Emigration	Net immigration
1999	41,841	22,842	+18,999
2000	36,542	26,854	+9,688
2001	34,264	26,309	+7,955
2002	40,122	22,948	+17,174
2003	35,957	24,672	+11,285
2004	36,482	23,271	+13,211
2005	40,148	21,709	+18,439
2006	45,776	22,053	+23,723
2007	61,774	22,122	+39,652
2008	66,961	23,615	+43,346
2009	65,186	26,549	+38,637
2010	73,852	31,506	+42,346
2011	79,498	32,466	+47,032
2012	78,570	31,227	+47,343
2013	75,789	35,716	+40,073
2014	70,030	31,875	+38,155
2015	67,276	37,474	+29,802
2016	66,800	40,724	+26,076
2017	58,192	36,843	+21,349
2018	52,485	34,382	+18,103
2019	52,153	26,826	+25,327
2020	38,075	26,744	+11,331
2021	53,947	34,297	+19,650
2022	90,475	32,536	+57,939
2023	86,589	34,011	+52,578
2024	66,077	31,968	+34,109
2025	55,243	32,919	+22,324

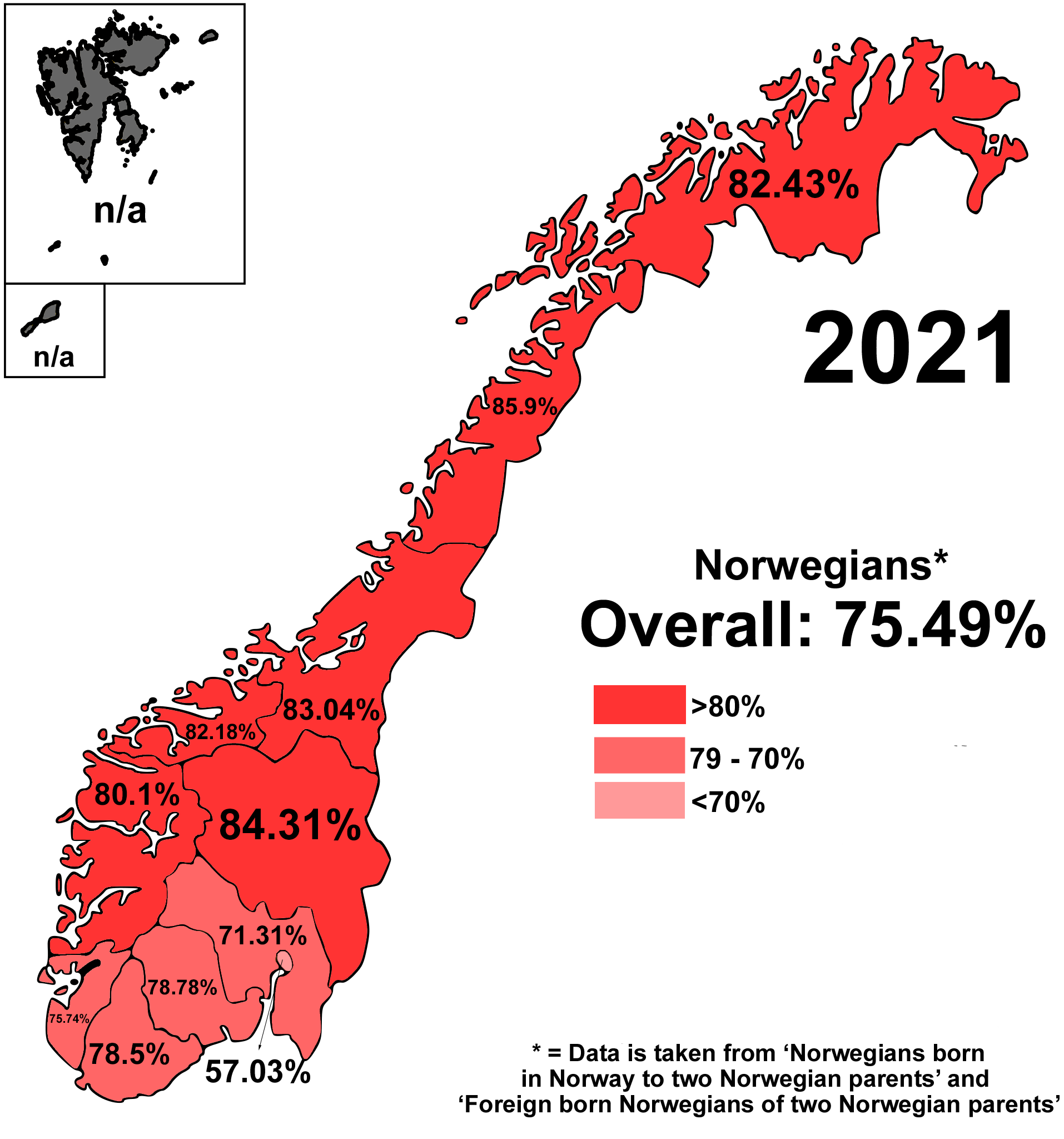
Norwegians of two Norwegian parents, either born abroad or in Norway, as a percentage proportionally and nationally in Norway as of 2021

Foreign born and their descendants in Norway in 2022

Norwegian and foreign born population pyramid in 2023

In the last decades, Norway has become home to increasing numbers of immigrants, foreign workers, and asylum-seekers from various parts of the world. Norway had a steady influx of immigrants from South Asia (mostly Pakistanis and Sri Lankans), East Asia (mainly Chinese), Pacific Islands and Southeast Asia (e.g. Filipinos), Eastern Europe (e.g. Russians) and Central Europe (e.g. Poles), Southern Europe (Greeks, Albanians and people from former Yugoslavia, Bosniaks, Serbs etc.), and Middle East countries (especially Kurdish Iraqis and Kurdish Iranians), as well as Somalis, Turks, Moroccans, and some Latin Americans. After ten Eastern European and Baltic countries joined the EU in 2004, there has also been a substantial influx of people from Lithuania, Latvia and Estonia.

At the start of 2022, there were 819,356 immigrants and 205,819 Norwegian-born to immigrant parents in Norway, together constituting 18.9% of the total population. The same year, immigrants (and Norwegian born to immigrant parents) originating in the European Economic Area constituted 7.1% of the total number of Norwegian residents, while 6.3% were from Asia including Turkey and 2.7% were from Africa.

Among people of African descent in Oslo, almost 60% are younger than 30, compared to 20% of those of North American background.

As of 2022, there are around 207,575 third generation immigrants in Norway. This means that at least one of their grandparents were born in a foreign country. The majority of these persons are of Western European and Northern European background with Sweden and Denmark accounting for 36,126 (17.4%) and 33,695 (16.2%) respectively. Other countries with significant third generation communities are the United States with 29,395 (14.1%), the United Kingdom with 17,882 (8.6%), Germany with 14,090 (6.8%), Finland with 6,213 (3%) and South Korea with 5,199 (2,5%).

Of these 1,025,175 immigrants and their descendants (born in Norway with two foreign born parents):

- 419,720 (41%) have a Western background (UK, Australia, New Zealand, USA, Canada and the EU)
- 88,192 (9%) have a different European background (e.g. Russia, Albania, Kosovo, Serbia, Bosnia and Herzegovina and Switzerland are included here)
- 29,515 (3%) have a background from Latin America and the Caribbean
- 144,868 (14%) have an African background
- 342,571 (33%) have an Asian background, including Turkey

In 2012, of the total 660 000 with immigrant background, 407,262 had Norwegian citizenship (62.2 percent). Immigrants were represented in all Norwegian municipalities. The cities or municipalities with the highest share of immigrants in 2012 was Oslo (26 percent) and Drammen (18 percent). The share in Stavanger was 16%. According to Reuters, Oslo is the "fastest growing city in Europe because of increased immigration". In recent years, immigration has accounted for most of Norway's population growth.

Population Group	Year													
Population Group	1970		1980		1990		2000		2010		2020		2026	
Population Group	Number	%	Number	%	Number	%	Number	%	Number	%	Number	%	Number	%
Norwegians	3,795,534	98.25%	3,969,943	97.33%	4,047,528	95.62%	4,173,219	93.18%	4,275,120	88%	4,350,131	81.04%	4,359,928	77.48%
Norwegian born in Norway	3,732,091	96.61%	3,880,229	95.13%	3,931,143	92.87%	4,007,823	89.49%	4,031,805	82.99%	4,033,960	75.15%	4,003,379	71.14%
Foreign born to Norwegian born parents	10,544	0.27%	14,515	0.36%	16,004	0.38%	17,591	0.39%	36,688	0.76%	39,086	0.73%	39,163	0.70%
Norwegian born with one foreign-born parent	52,899	1.37%	75,199	1.84%	100,381	2.37%	147,805	3.30%	206,627	4.25%	277,085	5.16%	317,386	5.64%
Total: Immigrants	67,687	1.75%	108,957	2.67%	185,588	4.38%	305,278	6.82%	583,079	12%	1,017,449	18.96%	1,267,472	22.52%
Immigrants	57,041	1.48%	88,929	2.18%	150,973	3.56%	238,462	5.32%	459,346	9.46%	790,497	14.73%	987,120	17.54%
Norwegian born to immigrant parents	2,155	0.06%	6,273	0.15%	17,325	0.41%	44,025	0.98%	92,967	1.91%	188,757	3.52%	238,507	4.24%
Foreign born with one Norwegian parent	8,491	0.22%	13,755	0.34%	17,290	0.41%	22,791	0.51%	30,766	0.63%	38,195	0.71%	41,845	0.74%
Total	3,863,221	100%	4,078,900	100%	4,233,116	100%	4,478,497	100%	4,858,199	100%	5,367,580	100%	5,627,400	100%

Rank	Country of origin	Population (2026)
1.	(European Union) Poland	129,772
2.	Ukraine	88,235
3.	(European Union) Lithuania	51,467
4.	Syria	50,668
5.	Somalia	44,744
6.	Pakistan	44,113
7.	(European Union) Sweden	41,606
8.	Iraq	36,991
9.	Eritrea	36,307
10.	(European Union) Germany	32,051
11.	Philippines	29,913
12.	Afghanistan	27,871
13.	Russia	27,475
14.	Iran (Incl. Kurdistan province)	26,497
15.	India	25,016
16.	Thailand	24,772
17.	Vietnam	24,530
18.	Turkey	24,350
19.	(European Union) Romania	22,240
20.	(European Union) Denmark	20,160

Immigrants and Norwegian-born to immigrant parents, by country background. 1 January
	2026			
	Immigrants	Norwegian-born to immigrant parents	Immigrants in per cent of total population	Norwegian-born to immigrant parents in per cent of total population
Total	987 120	238 507	17.5	4.2
Nordic countries except Norway, EU/EFTA, UK, USA, Canada, Australia, New Zealand	401 633	55 788	7.1	1.0
Europe except EU/EFTA and UK, Africa, Asia, America except USA and Canada, Oceania except Australia and New Zealand, polar regions	585 485	182 718	10.4	3.2
Nordic countries except Norway	70 260	7 724	1.2	0.1
EU/EFTA until 2004 except the Nordic countries	96 317	9 910	1.7	0.2
New EU countries after 2004	218 757	37 073	3.9	0.7
Europe except for EU/EFTA/UK	154 436	26 452	2.7	0.5
Australia and New Zealand	2 689	92	0.0	0.0
Asia	288 439	102 097	5.1	1.8
Africa	112 410	49 767	2.0	0.9
America except USA and Canada	30 111	4 402	0.5	0.1
USA and Canada	13 610	991	0.2	0.0
Oceania except Australia and New Zealand	89	0	0.0	0.0

== Employment and income ==
Unemployment, youth ages 15–24
total: 10.4%. Country comparison to the world: 125th
male: 11.7%
female: 9% (2017 est.)

== Religion ==
The Lutheran Church of Norway is the former state church and the vast majority remain at least nominal members. Other religions do, however, enjoy religious freedom and have prospered with immigration in recent years, particularly Islam and Roman Catholicism. Saint Olaf is the patron saint of Norway. He is regarded by some as the eternal king and has a reputation and place in history unchallenged by any other Norwegian King for the last 1000 years.

Religion	Members	Percent	As of 2026
Christianity	3,818,949	67.9%	
The Church of Norway (Lutheran)	3,427,657	60.9%	
Other Christianity	391,292	7.0%	
Non-Christian religions	250,130	4.4%	
Islam	201,899	3.6%	
Buddhism	22,802	0.4%	
Hinduism	14,903	0.3%	
Sikhism	4,518	0.1%	
Bahá'í Faith	1,030	0.0%	
Judaism	770	0.0%	
Other religions	4,208	0.1%	
Non-religious and unknown	1,399,046	24.9%	
Humanism	159,275	2.8%	
Total	5,627,400	100.0%	

== Languages ==
Norwegian (the written standards Bokmål and Nynorsk).
Uralic languages – South Sámi, Lule Sámi, North Sámi and Kven – are additional official languages of some municipalities.

== See also ==
- Demographics of Svalbard
- Aging of Europe
