= Council for Religious and Life Stance Communities =

The Council for Religious and Life Stance Communities (Norwegian: Samarbeidsrådet for tros- og livssynssamfunn or STL) is an umbrella organization for religious organizations in Norway to foster interfaith dialogue. It was established on 30 May 1996 and has fourteen members from Baháʼí, Buddhism, Christianity, Hinduism, Holism, Humanism, Islam, Judaism and Sikhism. STL has eight local chapters, in Bergen, Drammen, Hamar, Kristiansand, Oslo, Stavanger, Trondheim and Tromsø.

== Members ==
- Baháʼí Community of Norway
- Buddhist Federation of Norway
- Catholic Church in Norway
- Christian Community
- Christian Council of Norway
- The Church of Jesus Christ of Latter-day Saints (LDS Church)
- Church of Norway
- Gurdwara Sri Guru Nanak Dev Ji (Sikhism)
- Holistic Community
- Islamic Council Norway
- Jewish Communities in Norway
- Norwegian Humanist Association
- Norwegian Hindu Culture Centre
- Sanatan Madir Sabha (Hinduism)
