= Hinduism in Finland =

Hindus in Finland
Total population
- 11,000 > 15.000 (2021)▲

Regions with significant populations
- All Over Finland

Religions
- Hinduism

Related ethnic groups
- Indians in Finland and Hindus

Hinduism is a minor religious faith in Finland. As of 2025, it is practiced by about 0.02% of the population.

There are, 1,072 Hindus in Finland. The majority are from India, Nepal and Sri Lanka. Finland acquired a significant Hindu population for the first time around the turn of the 21st century due to the recruitment of information technology workers from India by companies such as Nokia.

== Demographics ==
The population of Hindus in Finland from 2000 to 2025, according to Statistics Finland:

Historical population
Year	Pop.	±%
2000	37	—
2005	66	+78.4%
2010	91	+37.9%
2011	98	+7.7%
2012	96	−2.0%
2013	127	+32.3%
2014	300	+136.2%
2015	324	+8.0%
2016	345	+6.5%
2017	353	+2.3%
2018	358	+1.4%
2019	367	+2.5%
2020	368	+0.3%
2021	371	+0.8%
2022	379	+2.2%
2023	375	−1.1%
2024	378	+0.8%
2025	1,072	+183.6%

However, according to another estimate in 2011, there were 524 Hindus in Finland. According to ARDA in 2015, there were 1080 Hindus in Finland. As of 2021, there are 10,749 Indians in Finland, as well as 5,012 Nepalis and 1,704 Sri Lankans (a total of 17,465), though it is not known how many of them are Hindus.

== Controversy ==
In 2009, Hindu nationalists protested the inclusion of a photograph that they felt denigrated Hinduism in an exhibit at the Kiasma Museum of Contemporary Art. In response, the museum removed the word "Hinduism" from the title of the work on the museum label.

== Hindu Groups in Finland ==
- Ananda Marga, including the Sunrise Kindergarten in Espoo.
- Chinmoy Mission.
- Brahma Kumaris, Helsinki.
- Sathya Sai Organisation.

There is an International Society for Krishna Consciousness temple in Malmi, Helsinki.

Yoga of many varieties is flourishing. The Evangelical Lutheran Church of Finland, which claims over 80 per cent of native Finns as members, reports that yoga is practiced by tens of thousands.

== See also ==
- Hinduism in Sweden
