= Indians in Sweden =

People of Indian descent living in Sweden

Total population
- 59,290 (2024; by birth)
- Gothenburg · Stockholm · Lund · Malmö · Helsingborg · Uppsala · Solna · Sollentuna

Languages
- Kannada · Hindi · Marathi · Gujarati · Punjabi · Bangla · Malayalam · Telugu · Tamil · Swedish · English

Religion
- Buddhism · Hinduism · Sikhism · Christianity (Catholicism · Lutheranism) · Jainism · Islam (Sunni) · Religions of India

Related ethnic groups
- People of Indian Origin

Indians in Sweden are citizens and residents of Sweden who are of Indian descent. Along with the Chinese, Indians are also one of the largest Asian immigrant populations in Sweden.

== Demographics ==
During the period of 2001 to 2010, a total of 7,870 Indian students came for higher studies in Sweden. According to Statistics Sweden, as of 2016, there are a total 25,719 India-born immigrants living in Sweden. Most of these people of Indian origin are Punjabis, Bengalis, and South Indians. Some Indians sought and obtained political asylum after 1984. Some Indians have come to Sweden from Uganda in the 1970s.

According to Statistics Sweden, India is among the most common countries of birth for international adoptions in Sweden. As of 2016, there are 1,017 India-born children and young adults aged 0–21 who are adopted in Sweden.

According to the Institute of Labor Economics, as of 2014, India-born immigrants residing in Sweden have a labor force participation rate of approximately 54%. Their employment population ratio is about 49%. They also have an unemployment rate of around 6%.

Statistically, approximately 50% of the Indian-born population in Sweden live in the province of Stockholm and most of them work as IT engineers. In Skåne province, in 2020, Indians are one of the largest groups of immigrants along with Danes. In the three main cities in Skåne, Helsingborg, Lund and Malmö, the Indian immigrant population holds the first, second and fifth place among other immigrant populations respectively.

== See also ==
- India–Sweden relations
- Indian diaspora
- Immigration to Sweden
- Indians in Finland
