= Hinduism in Sweden =

Hindus in Sweden

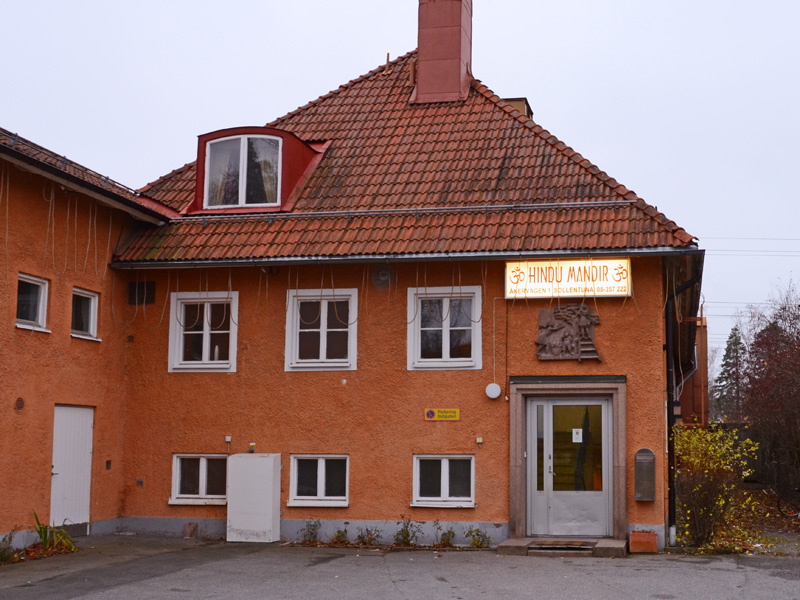
- A Hindu mandir in Helenelund

Total population
- 13,000 (2020)▲; 0.13% of total population

Regions with significant populations
- All Over Sweden

Religions
- Hinduism

Related ethnic groups
- Indians in Sweden and Hindus

Hinduism in Sweden is a minority religion practised by approximately 13,000 people, or 0.13% of the Swedish population. The Hindu demographic is composed of South Asian immigrants, including Sri Lankan Tamil refugees who arrived following the 1983 civil war and East African refugees in 1972. Population growth has been driven by labor migration, especially those in IT, engineering, and medical fields.

Sweden contains regional temples and transnational movements, such as ISKCON and ISSO. The Hindu Forum Sweden (HFS) leads public representation, civic advocacy, and interfaith engagement.

== History ==
Following World War II in 1946, Austrian writer initiated into the Gaudiya tradition, Walter Eidiitz, relocated to Sweden where he lived as a monk. Here, he also published various works on Gaudiya Vaishnavism.

In August 1972, President Idi Amin forced South Asians from Uganda. In response, Sweden accepted approximately 1,000 refugees. A significant portion were Gujarati Hindus who settled in the western industrial Swedish towns such as Mariestad, Jönköping, and Trollhättan.

Due to the Sri Lankan Civil War in 1983, many Sri Lankan Tamil refugees requested asylum in Sweden.

Since 2008, India has become a primary source for the country's skilled professionals including technology, engineering, and healthcare.

== Demographics ==
In 2005, the United States Department of State estimated the Hindu population to be between 7,000 and 10,000. Approximately 2,000 were identified as Sri Lankan Tamils and 1,500 as Bengali origin.

Following Swedish immigration policy reform in 2008, population growth is credited to IT specialists and university students. In 2020, the World Religion Database states 0.13% of Sweden's total population identifies as Hindu.In 2021, there were approximately 48,000 Indian-born residents in Sweden.

== Religious organisations and temples ==
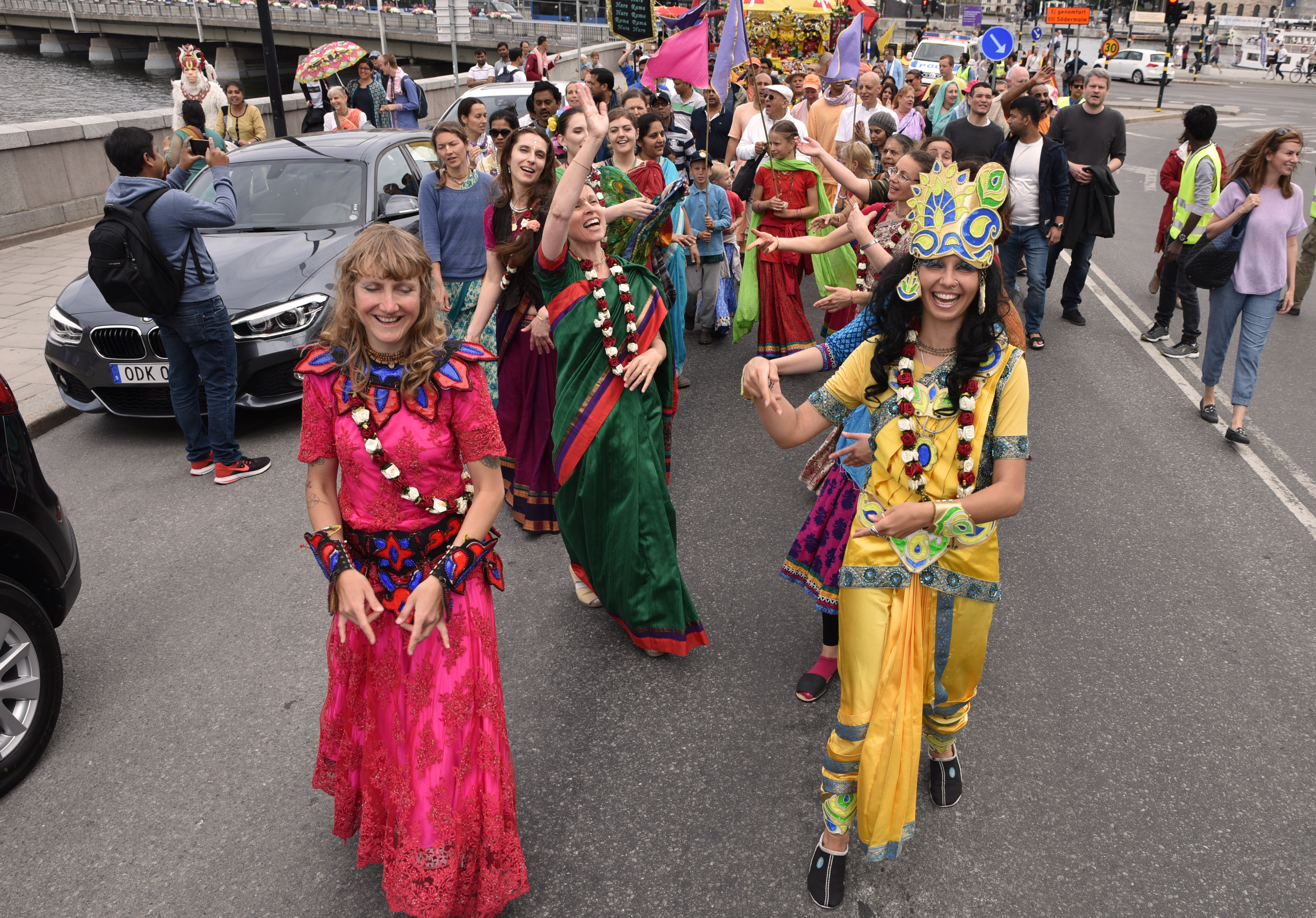
ISKCON celebration of Rath Yatra in the streets of Stockholm.

=== ISKCON ===
International Society for Krishna Consciousness (ISKCON) in Sweden was established in1973 following the visit of its founder A.C. Bhaktivedanta Swami Prabhupada. ISKCON operates from three primary locations in Sweden: Korsnäs Gård (rural center and headquarters), Almviks Gård (agricultural center and temple), and Stockholm (vegetarian restaurant and temple).

=== Jönköping Hindu Union ===
The Hindu Union Temple in Jönköping was established in 1974 as a house of worship serving families from Gujarati and Kutchi backgrounds.

=== Stockholm Vinayakar Temple ===
Sri Lankan Tamil refugees established the temple dedicated to Ganesha, alongside Shiva, Parvati, Murukan, and Lakshmi. The temple is central to devotional practices and community governance, in which women hold key leadership roles.

=== ISSO Swaminarayan ===
In July 1991, the International Swaminarayan Satsang Organisation (ISSO) opened a temple in Mariestad. It was inaugurated by Tejendraprasad and serves approximately 60 Kutchi families and 30 to 40 Gujarati families across Sweden.

== Public representation ==
The Vishwa Hindu Parishad (VHP) attempted to create an umbrella organization, the Hindu Association in Sweden, in the early 1990s and in 2001. Due to administrative disagreements and funding, the efforts were dissolved. Then, the Swedish Indians' Assocation (SIA) became an organization monitoring government policy and consumer products related to Hinduism.

=== Hindu Forum Sweden (HFS) ===
The Hindu Forum Sweden (HFS) was established in 2015 by members from SUDA (Sveriges Unga Dharmis och Ashavaner), Bangiya Sanatan Samaj, and. ISKCON as an umbrella organisation in Sweden. The HFS represents the Hindu community in the Interfaith Council of Sweden and is affiliated with the Hindu Forum of Europe (HFE). They organize public celebrations of Diwali, review textbook content of Hinduism in public schools, address pastoral care in healthcare facilities, and monitor human rights issues which may affect Hinduism.

== See also ==
- Hinduism in Europe
- Religion in Sweden
